= Impossible Music Festival =

The Impossible Music Festival was a recurring event broadcast on Australia's Triple J radio station over 55-hour periods in 2005, 2006, 2007 and 2008. Each event comprised 55 live music recordings from Triple J's music archives. The first went to air over 26–29 August 2005, to celebrate the 30 years worth of live music recorded by Triple J. The second was broadcast over 6–9 October 2006. The third was aired over 25–27 May 2007. The fourth and most recent was aired across 19–21 September 2008.

The lineup was selected by Triple J listeners voting for over 1000 live recordings made by Triple J. The recordings included music from festivals, concerts, smaller pub gigs, bands playing live in the studio, and some special events where listeners were able to win tickets to see the band for free in a secret location.

== 2005 ==
One live set was played every hour between 6 pm on Friday 26th, and 1 am on Monday 29 August. The following is the order in which the broadcasts went to air; the details in the brackets denotes the location and date in which the live recording was made.

=== Lineup ===
==== Friday ====
- The White Stripes (Livid, Sydney, 10 October 2003)
- Silverchair (Homebake, Byron Bay, 4 January 1996)
- Muse (Hordern Pavilion, Sydney, 10 September 2004)
- Violent Femmes (The Palace, Melbourne, 8 November 1990)
- Franz Ferdinand (Splendour in the Grass, Byron Bay, 24 July 2004)
- The Living End (Triple J rooftop, Sydney, 16 November 1998)

==== Saturday ====
- The Smashing Pumpkins (Overseas Passenger Terminal, Sydney's Circular Quay, 19 June 1998)
- Split Enz (Comb & Cutter Hotel, Blacktown, Sydney, 21 December 1979)
- The Mars Volta (Big Day Out, Sydney, 23 January 2004)
- Grinspoon (Triple J rooftop, Sydney, 15 November 1999)
- Green Day (Goat Island, Sydney, 19 October 2000)
- The Strokes (Triple J Studio 227, Sydney, 24 July 2001)
- John Butler Trio (ABC Iwaki Auditorium, Melbourne, 12 October 2001)
- The Flaming Lips (Big Day Out, Sydney, 24 January 2004)
- Red Hot Chili Peppers (Big Day Out, Melbourne, 31 January 2000)
- Missy Higgins (ABC Iwaki Auditorium, Melbourne, 1 November 2004)
- Beastie Boys (Summersault, Sydney, 31 December 1995)
- INXS (Caringbah Inn, Sydney, 1982)
- Jeff Buckley (Phoenician Club, Sydney, 6 September 1995)
- The Cat Empire (Meredith Music Festival, Meredith, 13 December 2003)
- Queens of the Stone Age (Big Day Out, Melbourne, January 2001)
- Nick Cave & The Bad Seeds (Big Day Out, Melbourne, January 1993)
- Coldplay (Splendour in the Grass, Byron Bay, 20 July 2003)
- Foo Fighters (Festival Hall, Melbourne, 22 March 1998)
- Hilltop Hoods (UniBar, University of Adelaide, Adelaide, 3 November 2001)
- Rage Against the Machine (El Rey Theatre, Hollywood, October 1999)
- AC/DC (Haymarket, Sydney, 1977)
- The Chemical Brothers (Big Day Out Boiler Room, Sydney, 26 January 2000)
- The Ramones (Capitol Theatre, Sydney, 1980)
- Shihad (Triple J Studios, Melbourne, 27 September 1999)

==== Sunday ====
- Michael Franti and Spearhead (The Palace, Melbourne, 20 July 2001)
- Powderfinger (Triple J Studio 227, Sydney, 12 October 1998)
- Beck (Triple J Studio 227, Sydney, 21 August 1994)
- The Cure (Capitol Theatre, Sydney, 1981)
- The Dandy Warhols (Corner Hotel, Melbourne, 30 October 2000)
- Interpol (Triple J Studio 227, Sydney, 11 August 2003)
- The Killers (Enmore Theatre, Sydney, 18 December 2004)
- Ben Folds Five (Triple J Studio 227, Sydney, 29 July 1998)
- Crowded House (Transformers, Melbourne, 28 July 1991)
- At the Drive-In (Triple J Studio 227, Sydney, 22 January 2001)
- PJ Harvey (Big Day Out, Melbourne, 26 January 2001)
- Pearl Jam (Melbourne Park, Melbourne, 5 March 1998)
- Frenzal Rhomb (Triple J Studio 227, Sydney, 12 May 2003)
- Fatboy Slim (Big Day Out Boiler Room, Sydney, January 2001)
- Ben Harper (SBW Independent Theatre, Sydney, 11 April 2001)
- You Am I (Triple J Studio 227, Sydney, 20 April 1998)
- Midnight Oil (Royal Antler Hotel, Sydney, 2 May 1980)
- System of a Down (Big Day Out, Gold Coast, January 2002)
- Faithless (Hordern Pavilion, Sydney, 8 October 2004)
- Nirvana (The Palace, Melbourne, 1 February 1992)
- Placebo (Hordern Pavilion, Sydney, 19 March 2004)
- Garbage (Davies Park, Brisbane, 5 October 1996)
- Faith No More (Festival Hall, Melbourne, 14 August 1995)
- Metallica (Big Day Out, Sydney, 23 January 2004)

==== Monday ====
- Tom Waits (State Theatre, Sydney, 2 May 1979)

=== Announcers ===
- Friday 6 pm – 10 pm - Rosie Beaton
- Friday 10 pm – Saturday 1 am - Robbie Buck
- Saturday 1 am – 6 am - Nicole Foote
- Saturday 6 am – 10 am - Scott Dooley
- Saturday 10 am – 2 pm - Zan Rowe
- Saturday 2 pm – 6 pm - Maya Jupiter
- Saturday 6 pm – 10 pm - Gaby Brown
- Saturday 10 pm – Sunday 1 am - Nicole Foote
- Sunday 1 am – 6 am - Dave Callan
- Sunday 6 am – 10 am - Scott Dooley
- Sunday 10 am – 2 pm - Zan Rowe
- Sunday 2 pm – 5 pm - Maya Jupiter
- Sunday 5 pm – 9 pm - Richard Kingsmill
- Sunday 9 pm – Monday 1 am - Fenella Kernebone

== 2006 ==
The 2006 Impossible Music Festival was broadcast over the weekend of 6 October-8 October.

=== Lineup ===
==== Friday ====
- The Hives (Big Day Out, Sydney, 2005)
- Spiderbait (Revolver Nightclub, Melbourne, 2001)
- Wolfmother (Studio 22, ABC TV, Sydney, 2005)
- Hilltop Hoods (Cable Beach, Broome, 2006)
- Placebo (Hordern Pavilion, Sydney, 2004)
- Red Hot Chili Peppers (Sydney Entertainment Centre, Sydney, 1996)

==== Saturday ====
- Groove Armada (Forum Theatre, Melbourne, 2002)
- Foo Fighters (Studio 227, ABC, Sydney, 2002)
- The Waifs (Iwaki Auditorium, ABC, Melbourne, 2002)
- Yeah Yeah Yeahs (ABC TV studios, Melbourne, 2006)
- Crowded House (Transformers, Melbourne, 1991)
- Butterfingers (Corner Hotel, Melbourne, 2006)
- The Whitlams (Studio 227, Sydney, 1998)
- The White Stripes (Studio 227, Sydney, 2002)
- Rose Tattoo (Mount Druitt, Sydney, 1980)
- The Shins (Meredith Music Festival, 2004)
- Kaiser Chiefs (The Metro Theatre, Sydney, 2005)
- Ben Folds Five (Studio 227, Sydney, 1998)
- Nirvana (The Palace, Melbourne, 1992)
- Muse (Studio 346, Melbourne, 2000)
- Cog (ANU, Canberra, 2005)
- Eskimo Joe (Studio 227, Sydney, 2004)
- Regurgitator (Darwin, 1997)
- silverchair (Studio 227, Sydney, 2002)
- The Grates (The Metro Theatre, Sydney, 2006)
- Jurassic 5 (Splendour in the Grass, Byron Bay, 2004)
- New Order (Big Day Out, Gold Coast, 2002)
- Bloc Party (Splendour in the Grass, Byron Bay, 2005)
- N*E*R*D (Enmore Theatre, Sydney, 2004)
- Basement Jaxx (Big Day Out Boiler Room, Sydney, 2000)

==== Sunday ====
- The Flaming Lips (Big Day Out, Sydney, 2004)
- Pearl Jam (Rod Laver Arena, Melbourne, 1998)
- Gyroscope (ABC Studios, Perth, 2004)
- The Strokes (The Gaelic Club, Sydney, 2005)
- The Ramones (Capitol Theatre, Sydney, Sydney, 1980)
- Custard (Studio 227, Sydney, 1997)
- The Black Keys (Studio 227, Sydney, 2003)
- Ween (Livid, Brisbane, 1993)
- The Tea Party (Enmore Theatre, Sydney, 1999)
- Death Cab for Cutie (Studio 227, Sydney, 2003)
- Jeff Buckley (Phoenician Club, Sydney, 1995)
- Talking Heads (State Theatre, Sydney, 1979)
- Powderfinger (Forum Theatre, Melbourne, 2000)
- Blur (1997)
- Xavier Rudd (Iwaki Theatre, Melbourne, 2004)
- AC/DC (Haymarket, Sydney, 1975)
- Machine Gun Fellatio (2001)
- Gomez (Enmore Theatre, Sydney, 2004)
- The Herd (Newcastle Leagues Club, Newcastle, 2005)
- Kings of Leon (Big Day Out, Sydney, 2006)
- The Smashing Pumpkins (Studio 227, Sydney, 1996)
- The Killers (Enmore Theatre, Sydney, 2005)
- Beastie Boys (Big Day Out, Sydney, 2005)
- Underworld (The Metro Theatre, Melbourne, 2003)

==== Monday ====
- Nick Cave and the Bad Seeds (Big Day Out, Melbourne, 1996)

=== Announcers ===
- Friday 6 pm – 10 pm - Rosie Beaton
- Friday 10 pm – Saturday 1 am - Sharif Galal
- Saturday 1 am – 6 am - Nicole Foote
- Saturday 6 am – 10 am - Scott Dooley
- Saturday 10 am – 2 pm - Zan Rowe
- Saturday 2 pm – 6 pm - Gaby Brown
- Saturday 6 pm – 9 pm - Dave Callan
- Saturday 9 pm – Sunday 1 am - Nicole Foote
- Sunday 1 am – 6 am - Kara Kidman
- Sunday 6 am – 10 am - Scott Dooley
- Sunday 10 am – 2 pm - Zan Rowe
- Sunday 2 pm – 6 pm - Gaby Brown
- Sunday 6 pm – 10 pm - Kirileigh Lynch
- Sunday 10 pm – Monday 2 am - Fenella Kernebone

== 2007 ==
The 2007 Impossible Music Festival was broadcast over the weekend of 25 May-27 May.

=== Lineup ===
==== Friday ====
- Kings of Leon (Big Day Out, Sydney, 2006)
- Lyrics Born (Prince of Wales, Melbourne, 2005)
- The Police (1979)
- Supergrass (2000)
- The Dresden Dolls (2006)
- The Used (2004)
- Itch-E and Scratch-E (1995)

==== Saturday ====
- Futureheads (Splendour in the Grass, Byron Bay, 2005)
- Apollo 440 (2000)
- The Herd (Newcastle Leagues Club, Newcastle, 2005)
- Warumpi Band (1998)
- Primal Scream (1995)
- Martha Wainwright (2005)
- Snow Patrol (Splendour in the Grass, Byron Bay, 2006)
- Ian Dury and The Blockheads (1981)
- Resin Dogs (2000)
- Ash (1996)
- Missy Higgins (Iwaki Auditorium, ABC, Melbourne, 2004)
- Radio Birdman (1977)
- The Cat Empire (2005)
- Arctic Monkeys (2006)
- Billy Bragg (1977)
- Blues Explosion (2005)
- Carl Cox (2001)
- Sharon Jones & The Dap-Kings (2006)
- Black Keys (2003)
- The Grates (The Metro Theatre, Sydney, 2006)
- AC/DC (Haymarket, Sydney, 1975)
- Basement Jaxx (2006)
- Iggy & The Stooges (2006)
- Mars Volta (2003)

==== Sunday ====
- Fatboy Slim (1999)
- Lily Allen (2007)
- Downsyde (2003)
- Hoodoo Gurus (1984)
- Interpol (2003)
- John Cale (1983)
- Bright Eyes (2005)
- Moby (Splendour in the Grass, Byron Bay, 2005)
- Tegan and Sara (2006)
- XTC (1980)
- Wolfmother (ABC TV studios, Sydney, 2005)
- Mylo (2005)
- Faith No More (1990)
- Hilltop Hoods (2004)
- Bernard Fanning (2005)
- Moloko (2004)
- Midnight Oil (1982)
- The White Stripes (Livid, Sydney, 10 October 2003)
- Faithless (Hordern Pavilion, Sydney, 8 October 2004)
- Gary Numan (1980)
- Metallica (Big Day Out, Sydney, 23 January 2004)
- The Bens (2003)
- Hole (1995)

==== Monday ====
- Dirty Three (2004)

=== Announcers ===
- Friday 6 pm – 10 pm - Rosie Beaton
- Friday 10 pm – Saturday 1 am - Jem Gold
- Saturday 1 am – 6 am - Nicole Foote
- Saturday 6 am – 10 am - Scott Dooley
- Saturday 10 am – 2 pm - Vijay Khurana
- Saturday 2 pm – 6 pm - Gaby Brown
- Saturday 6 pm – Sunday 1 am - Liza Harvey
- Sunday 1 am – 6 am - Sam Simmons
- Sunday 6 am – 10 am - Scott Dooley
- Sunday 10 am – 2 pm - Vijay Khurana
- Sunday 2 pm – 6 pm - Amy Blackmur
- Sunday 6 pm – 10 pm - Richard Kingsmill
- Sunday 10 pm – Monday 2 am - Fenella Kernebone

== 2008 ==
The 2008 Impossible Music Festival was broadcast over the weekend of 19 September-21 September.

=== Lineup ===
==== Friday ====
- Kings of Leon
- Rage Against the Machine
- 2 Many DJ's
- Spiderbait
- Jurassic 5
- Ramones
- The Gossip

==== Saturday ====
- Ben Folds Five
- Franz Ferdinand
- Blink 182
- Propellerheads
- José González
- The Shins
- Cold Chisel
- Amy Winehouse
- Cold War Kids
- Pixies
- Beastie Boys
- The Triffids
- Nirvana
- Klaxons
- Silverchair
- Crowded House
- Tegan and Sara
- Hilltop Hoods
- Fatboy Slim
- Bloc Party
- James Murphy
- Busy P
- Muph and Plutonic

==== Sunday ====
- The Cat Empire
- Arctic Monkeys
- Aphex Twin
- Died Pretty
- Xavier Rudd
- Air
- Sunnyboys
- Björk
- Radiohead
- Foo Fighters
- New Order
- N*E*R*D
- Muse
- Hunters and Collectors
- Yeah Yeah Yeahs
- The Presets
- Arcade Fire
- The Chemical Brothers
- The Cure
- The Verve
- Cut Copy
- Talking Heads
- Jeff Buckley

=== Announcers ===
- Friday 6 pm – 10 pm - Rosie Beaton
- Friday 10 pm – Saturday 1 am - Will Styles & Learned Hand
- Saturday 1 am – 6 am - Nicole Foote
- Saturday 6 am – 10 am - Sam Simmons
- Saturday 10 am – 2 pm - Brendan Maclean
- Saturday 2 pm – 6 pm - Rosie Beaton
- Saturday 6 pm – 9 pm - Kirileigh Lynch
- Saturday 9 pm – Sunday 1 am - Nicole Foote
- Sunday 1 am – 6 am - Dave Callan
- Sunday 6 am – 10 am - Sam Simmons
- Sunday 10 am – 2 pm - Brendan Maclean
- Sunday 2 pm – 6 pm - Rosie Beaton
- Sunday 6 pm – 10 pm - Richard Kingsmill
- Sunday 10 pm – Monday 1 am - Fenella Kernebone

== 2009 ==
There was no Impossible Music Festival in 2009 due to the Hottest 100 of All Time.

== 2010 ==
Triple J asked their listeners who their favourite live acts ever are, this is the result:

1. Muse
2. Rage Against the Machine
3. Daft Punk
4. Bloc Party
5. Art vs. Science
6. The Cat Empire
7. Vampire Weekend
8. Hilltop Hoods
9. The Presets
10. Yeah Yeah Yeahs
11. Foo Fighters
12. John Butler Trio
13. The Flaming Lips
14. Pearl Jam
15. The Prodigy
16. Florence and the Machine
17. Phoenix
18. Grinspoon
19. Tool
20. Radiohead
