= Richard Kingsmill =

Australian radio announcer and music journalist

- Education: Macquarie University
- Occupations: Radio announcer; music director; producer; music journalist

Richard Kingsmill is an Australian radio announcer and music journalist. He worked for ABC radio station triple j from 1988 until his redundancy in December 2023, and was the station's longest-serving presenter. From 2017 he was group music director of triple j, triple j Unearthed, Double J, ABC Country, and ABC Local Radio.

== Early life and education ==
Richard Kingsmill studied mass communications at Macquarie University in the early 1980s. Kingsmill was a regular at educational radio station 2SER while studying at university. 2SER was run jointly by Macquarie University and the University of Technology Sydney.

== Career ==
While at 2SER in 1988, Kingsmill made a four-part series on the Australian music industry called Money, Not Harmony.

His career at the ABC started in 1988 as a producer for triple j. He presented on-air for the first time in 1990.

He introduced and hosted the shows The J Files (8 years) and the Australian Music Show (10 years), and was co-founder of triple j Unearthed in 1995, a fact of which he is very proud, in particular "being able to uncover the likes of Missy Higgins, Grinspoon, G Flip, and Genesis Owusu".

Kingsmill began hosting triple j's new releases show on Sunday evenings, named for the current year, in 1996. This show continues as of 2023 as one of the highest-rating shows.

In 1998, Kingsmill hosted an Australian music-themed program on Rage, for Australian Music Week. In 2009, he presented the triple j Hottest 100 of All Time on Rage with Zan Rowe.

In 2003, Kingsmill was promoted to the position of music director after the retirement of Arnold Frolows, who had been in the position since the inception of Double Jay (as triple j was then known) in 1975.

From 2004 until 2019, he curated the annual "One Night Stand" live concerts in remote or regional towns.

In 2009, Kingsmill was the initiator and curator of Before Too Long: Triple J's Tribute to Paul Kelly. The show ran over two nights at the Forum Theatre in Melbourne in November, with various artists performing tracks by Paul Kelly. The concert was recorded for a 3× CD and a 2x DVD of the same name released in February 2010.

In 2011, Kingsmill created Straight To You: triple j’s Tribute To Nick Cave.

In January 2012, he took a break for six months to travel overseas, with Nick Findlay stepping in as acting music director.

In 2015, Kingsmill selected the artists for the live concert "Beat The Drum: Celebrating 40 Years of triple j" The soundtrack once again took out an ARIA.

In 2016, he started The Funhouse on Double J, which in 2023 celebrated its 350th show and is one of the station's most loved programs.

Over the years, he hosted hundreds of interviews with well-known musicians, including David Bowie, Radiohead, Björk, Nick Cave, Daft Punk, Flume, Gotye, Lana Del Rey, and Kendrick Lamar. In 1998, a remarkable interview with Tori Amos went to air live on the J Files.

In 2017, Kingsmill became group music director, coordinating the team of music directors for four stations on the ABC national network: triple j, triple j Unearthed, Double J and ABC Local Radio. He also oversaw music content at ABC Country, and in 2023 another station, triple j's Hottest, was added.

In December 2023, he announced his departure from the ABC, having been made redundant as part of a restructuring of the triple j network. During his time at triple j, Kingsmill managed to double the amount of airtime given to Australian artists, from 30 percent to 60 percent. The station's audience increased from 980,000 in 2006 to 3 million in 2022.

== Recognition and awards ==
- 2010: Before Too Long: Triple J's Tribute to Paul Kelly, winner, Best Original Soundtrack/Cast/Show Album in the ARIA Awards
- 2011: Straight To You: triple j’s Tribute To Nick Cave, winner, Best Original Soundtrack/Cast/Show Album in the ARIA Awards
- May 2012: Voted International Music Director of the year at the Worldwide Radio Summit in Los Angeles
- 2014: sections of Kingsmill's 1999 radio interview with the late singer-songwriter Elliott Smith were used in the 2014 documentary of Elliot's life, Heaven Adores You
- 2015: 2015 ARIA Award, Best Original Soundtrack/Cast/Show Album, for Beat The Drum: Celebrating 40 Years of triple j
- 2015: Named no. 1 in the Australian Music Industry Directory's list, "Power 50"

== Influence and legacy ==
Kingsmill was triple j's longest-serving presenter. Ben Eltham wrote in a 2015 article in Meanjin that Kingsmill's musical preferences (mainly in hip hop, indie rock, and pop music) influenced what was played on triple j, and that he has shaped its identity. Eltham later (2023) wrote of him as a "kingmaker", who had the power to make a musician's career, and artists ignored by him resented this.

The longevity and present format of the TV program Rage was inspired by Kingsmill's radio show in which he hosted artists who would talk about music that they liked. An ABC staff member took this idea to management in 1998, after Rage had been running without any presenter for three years.

Kingsmill appeared in the 1998 Radiohead documentary Meeting People Is Easy.

In 2019, the National Film and Sound Archive of Australia published excerpts of Kingsmill's 2SER radio series, Money, Not Harmony. Archivist Liz Giuffre wrote: "Kingsmill would go on to become an extremely important part of the industry he so carefully documented here".

== Personal life ==
Kingsmill's older brother, Mark Kingsmill, was the drummer in the Australian rock band Hoodoo Gurus.

== Publications ==
- Kingsmill, R.; Mott, T.; Australian Broadcasting Corporation (2002). The J Files Compendium. ABC Books. ISBN 978-0-7333-1066-9.
- Kingsmill, R.; Coupe, S.; Australian Broadcasting Corporation; Triple J (Radio station) (1998). Triple J Internet Guide. ABC Books. ISBN 978-0-7333-0664-8.
