= Super Request =

Australian radio show

Super Request, formerly known as Request Fest, was a radio show broadcast on Australian youth broadcaster Triple J. It aired Monday to Thursday between 6pm and 9pm, and Fridays for an extra hour, from 1998 and 2011. The program relied on listeners to submit their song requests, which would be honoured by the announcer. From 2012, Super Request was replaced by the music program Good Nights.

For three years from 2020 to 2022, Triple J revived this format for Requestival, a radio takeover where the station played only the listeners' requests for several days straight.

Past hosts included Jane Gazzo, Rosie Beaton, Catriona Rowntree, Michael Tunn and Caroline Tran.
