= Vijay Khurana =

Australian radio announcer

- Born: Australia
- Education: University of East Anglia (MFA)
- Occupations: Writer; Radio announcer; Translator
- Notable work: Regal Beagle (2014), The Passenger Seat (2025)
- Spouse: Madeleine Watts
- Website: Vijay Khurana's website

Vijay Khurana is an Australian writer and radio announcer, who has worked on radio stations 2SER and Triple J.

== Radio career ==
Starting at 2SER in 2004, he first hosted the 3am-6am slot with his co-host Andre Leslie, which they called 'The Peruvian Lunch.' They went on to host weekday breakfast together, and Khurana subsequently hosted the Drive show. Moving to Triple J in 2005, he hosted shifts including the mid-dawn shift during the week and fill-in shifts.

On 14 April 2007, Khurana started his role as weekend lunch presenter on Triple J (10am-2pm), replacing previous presenter Gaby Brown.

On 6 December 2007, Vijay Khurana was announced as weekday lunch presenter on Triple J (12-3pm), replacing previous presenter Linda Marigliano, who in turn replaced Robbie Buck on the weekday Drive show (3pm-5.30pm) alongside Scott Dooley (Dools).

Khurana finished his last day on Triple J on 25 February 2011. He moved to Cambodia to work for a non-profit radio station in Phnom Penh.

== TV career ==
On 27 July 2007, Khurana made his debut appearance on TV, presenting jtv.

== Writing career ==
In 2014 Khurana published a children's novel, Regal Beagle, about a dog who becomes a queen. It was illustrated by Simon Greiner.

In 2019 he received his MFA in writing from the University of East Anglia.

His short fiction was twice shortlisted for the Galley Beggar Press Short Story Prize. His work was also shortlisted for the Bath Short Story Award, the Cúirt New Writing Prize, the Short Fiction/University of Essex Prize, and the Bristol Short Story Prize. In 2021 he won the 2021 Griffith Review Emerging Voices competition for his short story, 'The Menaced Assassin.' Khurana's work has appeared in NOON, 3:AM Magazine, and Erotic Review.

In 2022 Khurana's debut novel, The Passenger Seat, was shortlisted for the Novel Prize, awarded jointly by Fitzcarraldo, New Directions, and Giramondo. It was published in 2025 by Peninsula Press, Biblioasis, and Ultimo Press. It was shortlisted for the Christina Stead Prize for Fiction at the New South Wales Premier's Literary Awards.

Khurana is also a translator from the German into English. His translation of 'The Autopsy' by Georg Heym was published by Scratch Classics. An excerpt from his translation of Red (Hunger) by Senthuran Varatharajah was published in 2024 in The White Review Translation Anthology.

Khurana is married to the Australian writer Madeleine Watts.
