= ABSW =

ABSW may refer to:

- ABSW (TV station), the Australian Broadcasting Corporation's TV station in Bunbury, Western Australia
- American Baptist Seminary of the West, a theological school
- Association of British Science Writers, the UK society for science writers, journalists and communicators
- Angry Birds Star Wars, a video game
