= ABW (TV station) =

Television station in Western Australia

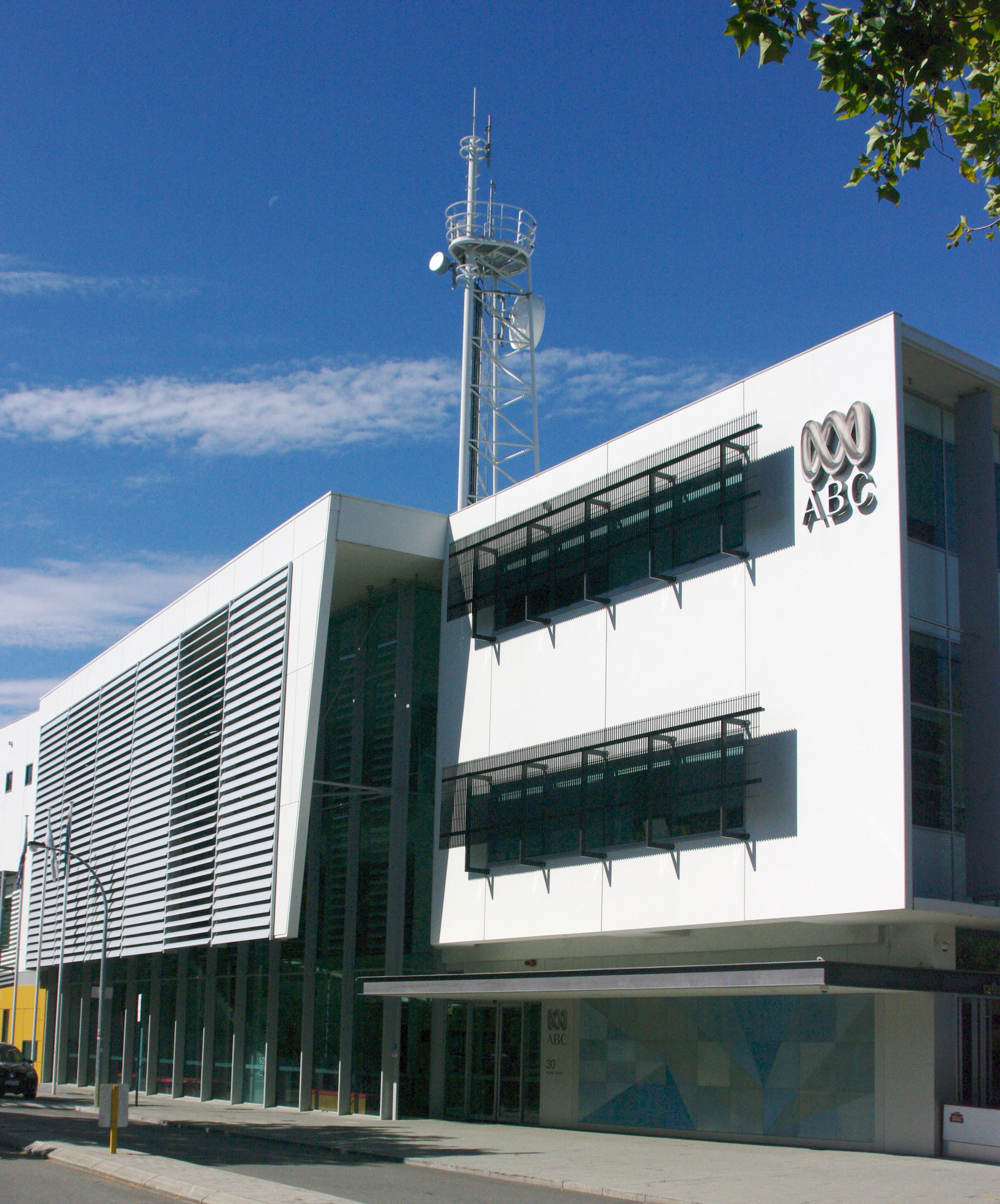
- Perth, Western Australia; Australia
- Channels: Digital: 12 (VHF); Virtual: 2

Programming
- Language: English
- Affiliations: ABC Television

Ownership
- Owner: Australian Broadcasting Corporation

History
- First air date: 7 May 1960
- Former channel number: Analog: 2 (VHF) (1960–2013)
- Call sign meaning: ABC Western Australia

Technical information
- Licensing authority: Australian Communications & Media Authority
- ERP: 50 kW
- HAAT: 284 m
- Transmitter coordinates: 32°0′38″S 116°5′4″E

Links
- Website: www.abc.net.au/tv

ABC Television in Western Australia comprises national and local programming on the ABC television network in the Australian state of Western Australia, on a number of channels under the ABC call sign. There is some local programming from the Perth studio.

ABW or ABW-2 was the historic call sign of the Australian Broadcasting Corporation's television station in Perth, with the "W" standing for the name of the state.

== History ==
The station began broadcasting on 7 May 1960 from studios on Adelaide Terrace in downtown Perth and its transmitter at Bickley. The station was relayed throughout the state by a number of transmitters, and in the 2000s on the Optus Aurora free-to-view satellite television platform, replaced by Viewer Access Satellite Television (VAST) in 2010.

ABW commenced digital television transmission in January 2001, broadcasting on VHF Channel 12 while maintaining analogue television transmission on VHF Channel 2.

In 2005 the station moved to a new digital broadcast centre in East Perth.

In February 2013 ABC Perth was the first TV station in Western Australia to start producing a national news bulletin at 5.30pm.

The analogue signal for ABW was shut off on 16 April 2013.

The Western Australian edition of 7.30 was presented by Andrew O'Connor each Friday night but was cancelled in 2014 to broadcast a national edition only, in a round of severe cuts to the ABC.

The channel used to carry live coverage of West Australian Football League matches every Saturday afternoon throughout the season until 2014.

== ABC Television in WA today ==
As of 2021 there is a large number of transmitters broadcasting a number of ABC channels.

=== Programming ===
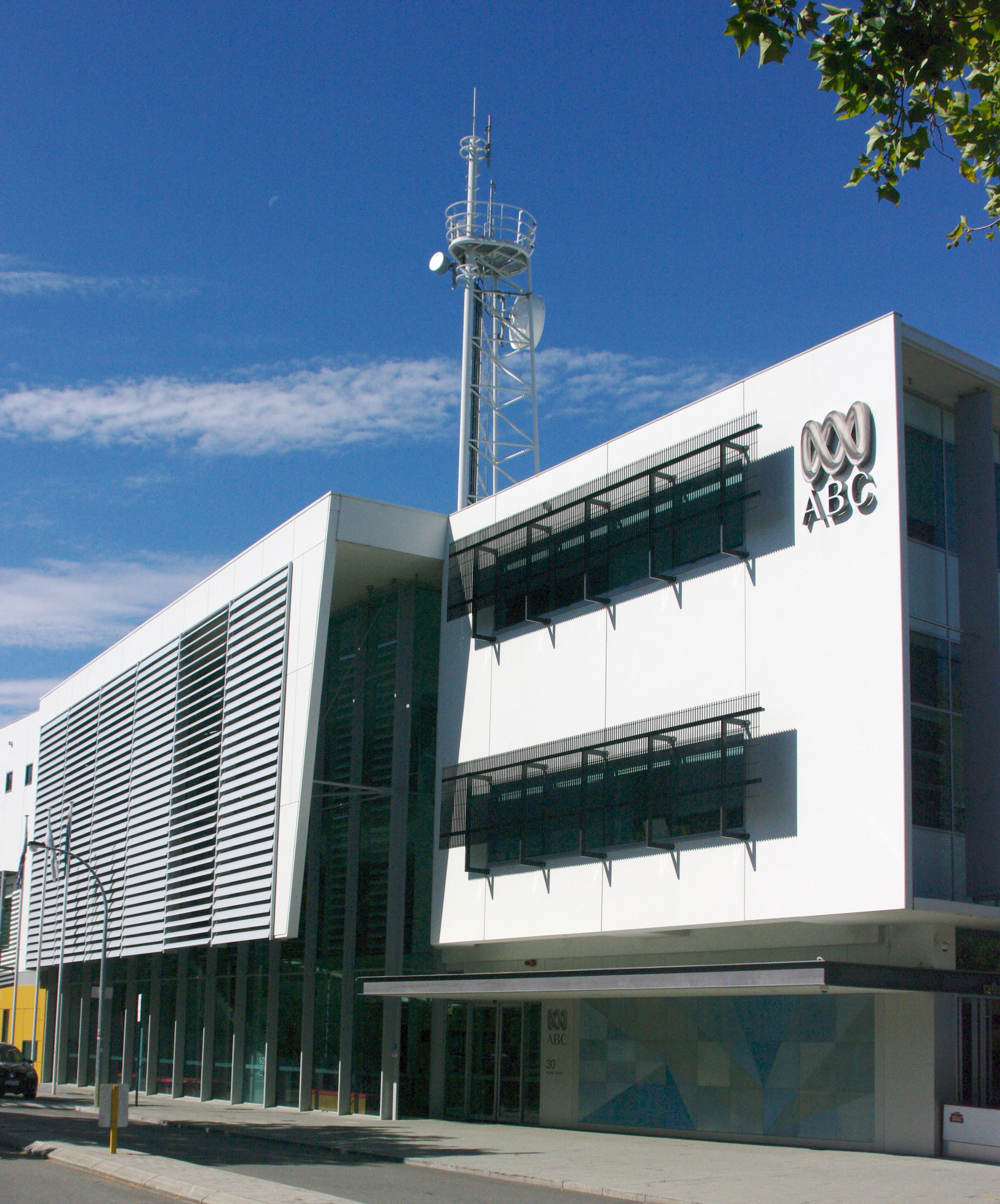
East Perth studios

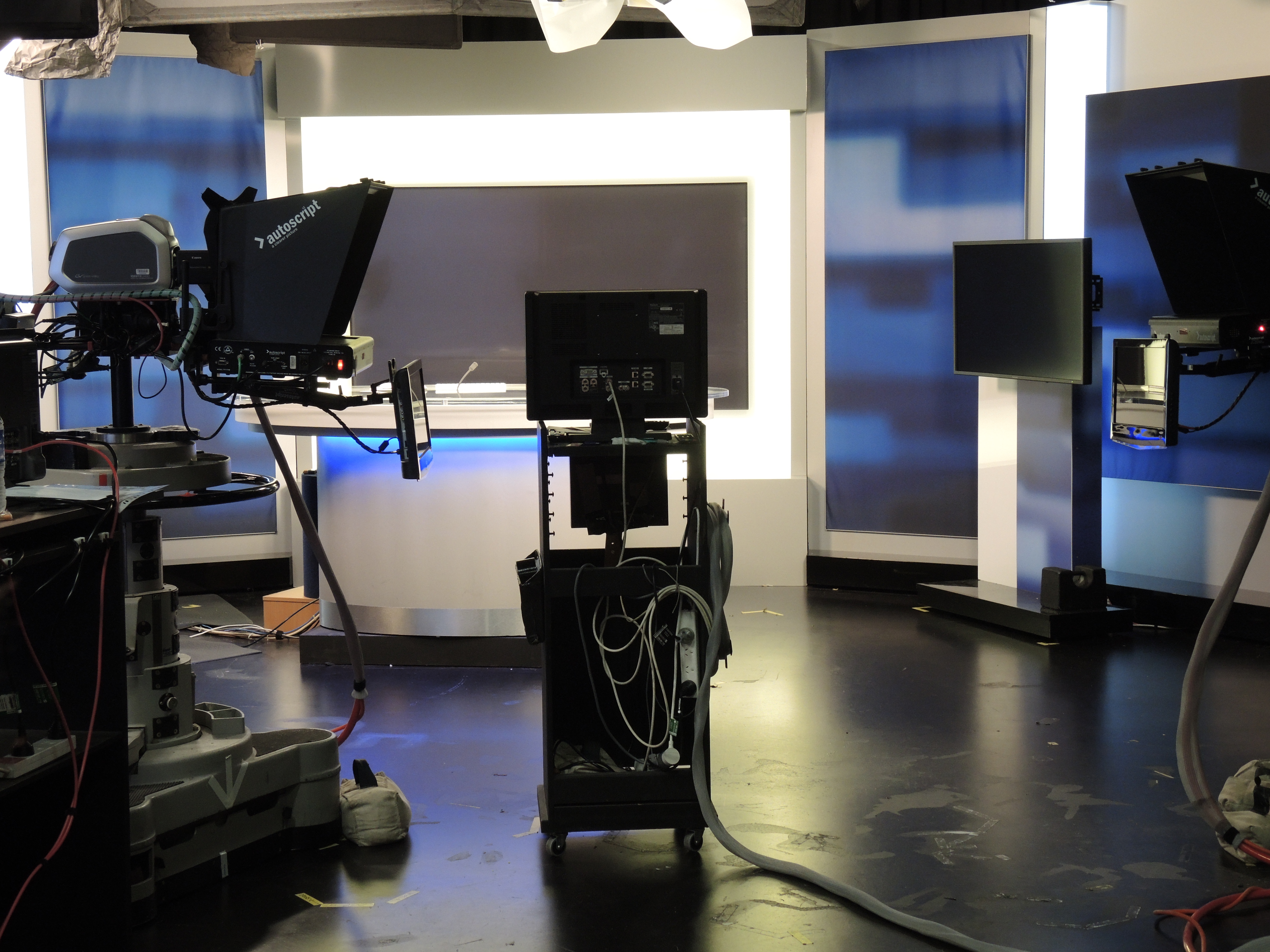
News studio

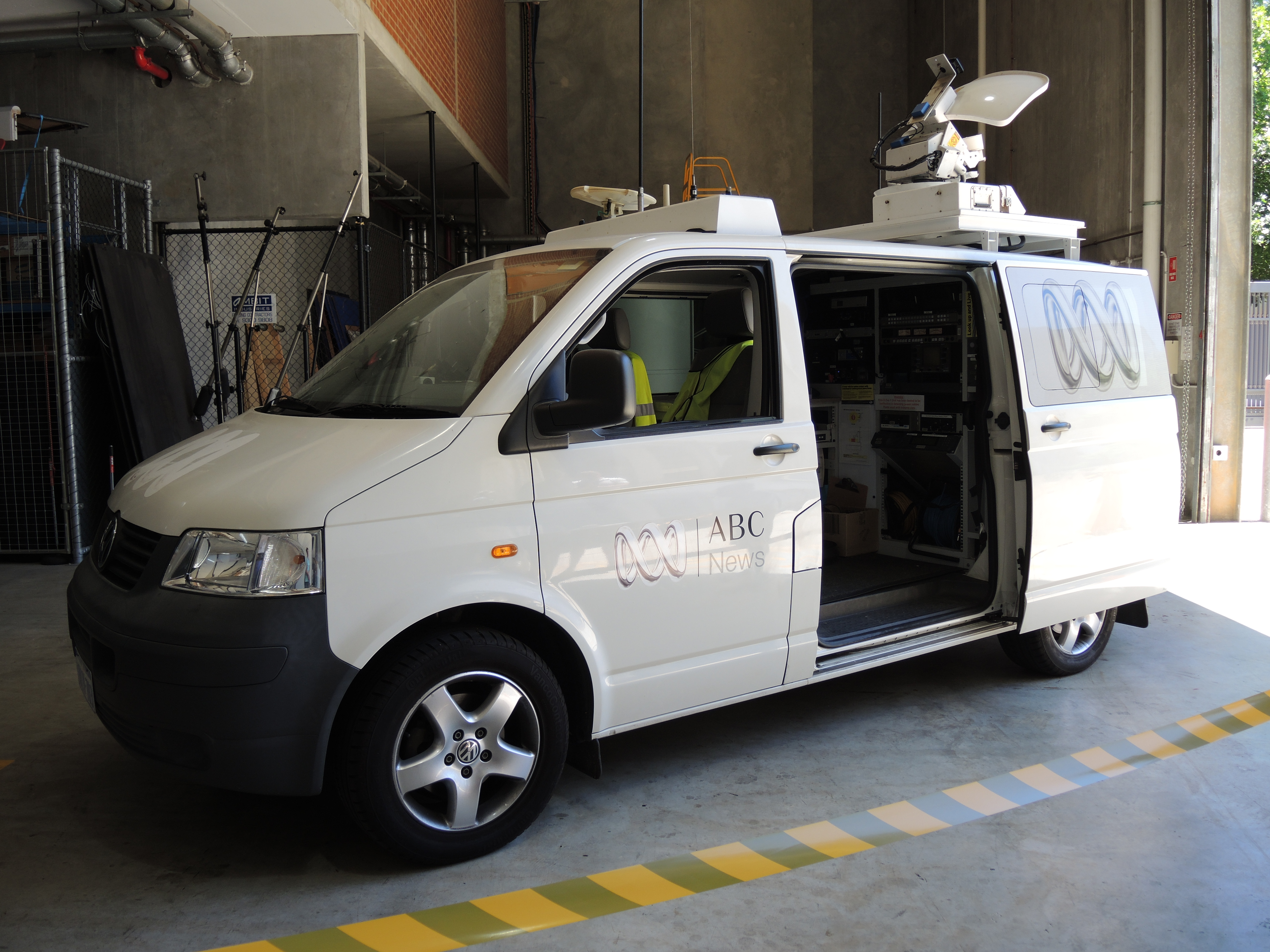
Satellite link truck, used for outside broadcasts or live crosses

ABC News Western Australia is presented by Pamela Medlen (Monday-Thursday), Charlotte Hamlyn (Friday-Sunday,) and Herlyn Kaur for weather on weeknights. Tom Wildie presents local sport bulletins on weekends. The weeknight bulletins also incorporates a national finance segment presented by David Chau in Sydney.

Due to different time zones in Australia, the 5:30 news bulletin goes live to air on the east coast at 5.30pm and a separate local edition is produced for the west coast. Perth also receives a local version of ABC News at Noon produced from the ABC's Sydney studios, which is also simulcast live nationally on the ABC News channel.

=== Presenters ===
On 6 April 2018, weeknight weather presenter Rebecca Dollery stepped down from the ABC due to family reasons. From 9 April, Dollery was replaced by Irena Ceranic as weather presenter. In January 2021, Tyne Logan took over from Ceranic as weather presenter on weeknights. As at March 2023, Herlyn Kaur or Tabarak Al Jrood currently present the weeknight weather, replacing Tyne Logan.

In late June 2018, Tom Wildie replaced Trevor Jenkins as the weekend sport presenter.

James McHale formerly presented the news on weekdays, until 11 September 2020.

Briana Shepherd formerly presented the news on weekends, between August 2021 and June 2022, while Charlotte Hamlyn is on maternity leave.

== Relay stations ==
The following stations relayed ABW throughout Western Australia:

Call	Region served	City	Channels (analog/ digital)	First air date	3rd letter's meaning	ERP (analog/ digital)	HAAT (analog/ digital) (Note: HAAT estimated from http://www.itu.int/SRTM3/ using EHAAT.)	Transmitter coordinates	Transmitter location
ABAW	Southern Agricultural Area	Albany	2 (VHF); 11 (VHF)	6 June 1966	Albany	200 kW; 50 kW	321 m 375 m	34°39′21″S 117°38′49″E	Mount Barker
ABCW	Central Agricultural Area	Northam	5A (VHF) (Note: ABCW was on VHF channel 4 from its 1966 sign-on until the late 1970s, moving to its current channel to accommodate FM radio.); 45 (UHF)	28 March 1966	Central Agricultural area	160 kW; 300 kW	251 m 270 m	31°59′4″S 117°11′24″E	Mawson Trig
ABCMW	Morawa	Morawa	8 (VHF); 7 (VHF)	8 March 1975	ABC Morawa	13 kW; 3.2 kW	137 m 137 m	29°19′6″S 115°52′53″E	Mount Campbell
ABCNW	Carnarvon	Carnarvon	7 (VHF); 6 (VHF)	30 June 1972	CarnarvoN	0.5 kW; 0.125 kW	112 m 112 m	24°54′20″S 113°43′13″E	Brown Range
ABDW	Dampier	Dampier	29 (UHF) (Note: ABDW originally broadcast on VHF channel 10.); 28 (UHF)	17 December 1973	Dampier	0.08 kW; 0.02 kW	79 m 79 m	20°39′19″S 116°43′42″E	Kangaroo Hill
ABEW	Esperance	Esperance	10 (VHF); 9A (VHF)	21 October 1974	Esperance	2 kW; 0.5 kW	128 m 130 m	33°52′30″S 121°53′41″E	Wireless Hill
ABGW	Geraldton	Geraldton	6 (VHF); 41 (UHF)	8 December 1969	Geraldton	32 kW; 150 kW	257 m 273 m	28°40′55″S 114°40′37″E	Moresby Range
ABKW	Kalgoorlie	Kalgoorlie	6 (VHF); 9A (VHF)	27 January 1970	Kalgoorlie	8 kW; 4 kW	110 m 110 m	30°43′2″S 121°26′25″E	Peters Hill
ABKAW	Karratha	Karratha	54 (UHF) (Note: ABKAW originally broadcast on VHF channel 7.); 53 (UHF)	17 December 1973	KarrathA	0.8 kW; 0.25 kW	114 m 114 m	20°44′8″S 116°51′33″E	Karratha
ABMW	Moora	Moora	60 (UHF) (Note: ABMW was on VHF channel 10 from its 1974 sign-on until 26 February 1988, moving to its current channel to accommodate a new TV station in Perth on channel 10 (NEW).); 52 (UHF)	30 September 1974	Moora	120 kW; 30 kW	142 m 142 m	30°38′7″S 116°9′35″E	Quarrel Range
ABNW	Norseman	Norseman	7 (VHF); 6 (VHF)	14 April 1971	Norseman	0.08 kW; 0.02 kW	69 m 70 m	32°8′34″S 121°43′40″E	Norseman
ABPHW	Port Hedland	Port Hedland	7 (VHF); 8 (VHF)	3 October 1973	Port Hedland	3 kW; 0.75 kW	52 m 52 m	20°22′2″S 118°33′32″E	Finucane Island
ABRBW	Roebourne	Roebourne	9 (VHF); 9A (VHF)	17 December 1973	RoeBourne	2 kW; 0.5 kW	71 m 73 m	20°46′19″S 117°8′32″E	Mount Welcome
ABSW	Bunbury	Bunbury	5 (VHF) (Note: ABSW is the only station in Australia to use channel 5.); 36 (UHF)	10 May 1965	South West	300 kW; 300 kW	308 m 332 m	33°23′48″S 115°54′53″E	Mount Lennard
ABSBW	Southern Cross/Bullfinch	Southern Cross	9 (VHF); 7 (VHF)	16 July 1973	Southern Cross/Bullfinch	2 kW; 0.5 kW	117 m 118 m	31°16′34″S 119°30′33″E	Ghooli
ABW	Broome	Broome	8 (VHF); 9 (VHF)		Western Australia	2 kW; 0.5 kW	75 m 75 m	17°53′19″S 122°15′48″E	Broome

== See also ==
- Television broadcasting in Australia
- ABC Radio Perth – radio station located in the same building
