= Ausmusic T-Shirt Day =

Annual initiative supporting Australian music

- Observed by: Supporters of Australian music
- Type: Commercial
- Celebrations: T-shirt wearing; donations to Support Act
- Date: One day in November (Ausmusic Month)
- First time: 2013
- Started by: Triple J

Ausmusic T-Shirt Day is an annual day of recognition and support for Australian musicians, held every November (Ausmusic Month) since 2013. It was founded by national youth radio station Triple J. Participants are encouraged to wear a t-shirt representing their favourite local artist, and make a donation to music industry charity Support Act. The initiative raises hundreds of thousands of dollars every year through the sales of limited edition t-shirts, often sold at community markets across the country.

== History ==
From 2007, British DJ Steve Lamacq annually championed Wear Your Old Band T-Shirt to Work Day, an initiative he created as host of BBC Radio 6 Music. Inspired by this, Ollie Wards, content director of Australian youth radio station Triple J, began a social media trend in 2013 with the hashtag #AusBandTShirtDay. Two years later, it started becoming known as #AusMusicTShirtDay to be inclusive of solo musicians. In 2015, the initiative began receiving support from the Australian Recording Industry Association.

Since 2017, the initiative has raised funds for Support Act, an Australian charity that assists those in the music industry facing personal hardships. A range of limited edition t-shirt designs are made available specifically for Ausmusic T-Shirt Day every year, with all net profits directed towards Support Act.

In 2022, Prime Minister Anthony Albanese wore a King Stingray edition of the T-shirt on Ausmusic T-shirt Day. In 2023, the artists participating in the t-shirt range included John Farnham, Cold Chisel, Kylie Minogue, Gang of Youths, and G Flip. For the 2023 event, over $700,000 was raised for Support Act, derived from over 680 fundraisers.

The 2024 campaign saw Support Act launch Mobmusic T-Shirt Day, a fundraiser specifically promoting Aboriginal Australian and Torres Strait Islander musicians. Triple J presenter Nooky was the face of the appeal.

== Donation totals ==
List of annual amounts raised from Ausmusic T-Shirt Day
Year	Amount raised	Ref.
2018	$111,572	
2019	$260,664	
2020 (Note: In 2020, due to the impact of the COVID-19 pandemic, Ausmusic T-Shirt Day was held on two dates: 17 April, and 20 November.)	1st: $26,000; 2nd: $327,000	
2021	$540,000	
2022	$637,000	
2023	$904,656	
2024	$981,000	
2025	TBA	
