= Beat the Drum (album) =

Beat The Drum: Celebrating 40 Years of Triple J

Live album by Triple J
- Released: 2015
- Venue: The Domain, Sydney
- Label: ABC Music

Beat the Drum: Celebrating 40 Years of Triple J is a live album recorded at the Domain, Sydney, on 19 January 2015, at a concert celebrating the 40th anniversary of Australian youth radio station Triple J. The recording was released on triple-CD and DVD in May 2015. Performing at the show were acts like Ball Park Music, Hilltop Hoods, Vance Joy and the Presets.

The album won the 2015 ARIA Award for Best Original Soundtrack, Cast or Show Album.

== Line-up ==
The performers, which were selected by Triple J presenter Richard Kingsmill, included Daniel Johns, Gotye, Sarah Blasko, Paul Dempsey, The Cat Empire, Owl Eyes, The Preatures, Bernard Fanning, Vance Joy, Tom Iansek, The Presets, The Hilltop Hoods, You Am I, Joelistics, and Adalita. The concert was broadcast live on Triple J.

== Reception ==
George Palathingal of The Sydney Morning Herald commented that "Some bands' sets tended towards the pedestrian when playing their own material but each featured a sparkling cover, a guest spot or two, a classic of their own or combinations thereof." Liz Giuffre wrote on The Conversation that "Most of the performers mixed their own music with covers. The pattern made a great novelty for trainspotters in the crowd, but also rewarded long-time listeners with fun trips back through the songbook." Sunshine Coast Daily wrote that "Last week’s Beat The Drum Festival in Sydney’s Domain to celebrate 40 years of Triple J on our airwaves was nothing short of spectacular."

The CD release peaked at No. 10 on ARIA's Album Chart, and the DVD reached No. 2 on ARIA's Top 40 Audiovisual chart. Kate Tala wrote in the Newcastle Herald that the CD and DVD were "jam-packed with an incredible string of guest appearances and unforgettable covers."

== Accolades ==
Year	Award	Nomination	Result
2015	ARIA Music Awards	Best Original Soundtrack/Cast/Show Album	Won

== Album track listing ==
Disc 1

1. Surrender - Ball Park Music
2. Everything Is Shit Except My Friendship With You - Ball Park Music
3. Trippin' The Light Fantastic - Ball Park Music
4. Like Wow-Wipeout - Ball Park Music (feat Dave Faulkner)
5. She Only Loves Me When I'm There - Ball Park Music
6. Wasted Time - Vance Joy
7. Reckless - Vance Joy feat Bernard Fanning and Tom Iansek
8. Play With Fire - Vance Joy
9. Riptide - Vance Joy
10. Mess Is Mine - Vance Joy
11. Hearts A Mess - Gotye
12. Thanks For Your Time - Gotye
13. It Gets Better (a.k.a. Better Than It Ever Could Be) - The Preatures
14. Ordinary - The Preatures
15. Cruel - The Preatures
16. Boys In Town - The Preatures feat Mark McEntee
17. Is This How You Feel? - The Preatures
18. Explain - Sarah Blasko
19. Distant Sun - Sarah Blasko and Paul Dempsey

Disc 2

1. The Hunt - Briggs (with Trials)
2. Rumble - You Am I
3. Say I'm Good - You Am I feat Joelistics
4. Jewels and Bullets - You Am I feat Adalita
5. Cathy's Clown - You Am I
6. Berlin Chair - You Am I
7. Smells Like Teen Spirit - Daniel Johns
8. Brighter Than Gold - The Cat Empire
9. Prophets In The Sky - The Cat Empire
10. Two Shoes - The Cat Empire
11. Saggin - The Cat Empire feat Remi
12. In My Pocket - The Cat Empire
13. Confide In Me - The Cat Empire feat Owl Eyes
14. Steal The Light - The Cat Empire
15. The Chariot / Hotel California - The Cat Empire
16. Switch Lanes - Tkay Maidza
17. U-Huh - Tkay Maidza

Disc 3

1. Fall - The Presets
2. Ghosts - The Presets feat Hermitude
3. This Boy's In Love - The Presets feat Megan Washington
4. Youth In Trouble - The Presets
5. My People - The Presets
6. Are You The One? - The Presets feat DZ Deathrays
7. Talk Like That - The Presets
8. Chase That Feeling - Hilltop Hoods
9. I Love It - Hilltop Hoods
10. Still Standing - Hilltop Hoods
11. Won't Let You Down - Hilltop Hoods
12. The Hard Road - Hilltop Hoods
13. Rattling The Keys To The Kingdom - Hilltop Hoods
14. Cosby Sweater - Hilltop Hoods feat Illy, Horrorshow, Drapht, Seth Sentry, Tkay Maidza and Thundamentals
15. The Nosebleed Section - Hilltop Hoods

== DVD track listing ==
1. Surrender - Ball Park Music
2. Everything Is Sh!t Except My Friendship With You - Ball Park Music
3. Like Wow-Wipeout - Ball Park Music Feat Dave Faulkner
4. She Only Loves Me When I’m There - Ball Park Music
5. Bad Apples - Briggs (With Trials)
6. Wasted Time - Vance Joy
7. Reckless - Vance Joy feat Bernard Fanning and Tom Iansek
8. Riptide - Vance Joy
9. Mess Is Mine - Vance Joy
10. Hearts A Mess - Gotye
11. Thanks For Your Time - Gotye
12. It Gets Better (a.k.a. Better Than It Could Ever Be) - The Preatures
13. Ordinary - The Preatures
14. Boys In Town - The Preatures feat Mark McEntee
15. Is This How You Feel? - The Preatures
16. Explain - Sarah Blasko
17. Distant Sun - Sarah Blasko and Paul Dempsey
18. Rumble - You Am I
19. Say I’m Good - You Am I feat Joelistics
20. Jewels And Bullets - You Am I feat Adalita
21. Cathy’s Clown - You Am I
22. Berlin Chair - You Am I
23. Smells Like Teen Spirit - Daniel Johns
24. Brighter Than Gold - The Cat Empire
25. Two Shoes - the CAt Empire
26. Saggin - The Cat Empire feat Remi
27. In My Pocket - The Cat Empire
28. Confide In Me - The Cat Empire feat Owl Eyes
29. The Chariot / Hotel California - The Cat Empire
30. U-Huh - Tkau Maidza
31. Ghosts - The Presets feat Hermitude
32. This Boy’s In Love - The Presets feat Megan Washington
33. Youth In Trouble - The Presets
34. My People - The Presets
35. Are You The One - The Presets feat DZ Deathrays
36. Talk Like That - The Presets
37. Chase That Feeling - Hilltop Hoods
38. I Love It - Hilltop Hoods
39. Won’t Let You Down - Hilltop Hoods
40. The Hard Road - Hilltop Hoods
41. Rattling The Keys To The Kingdom - Hilltop Hoods
42. Cosby Sweater - Hilltop Hoods feat Horroshow, Drapht, Seth Sentry, Tkay Maidza and Thundamentals
43. The Nosebleed Section - Hilltop Hoods
