= Edwin Maher =

New Zealand journalist

Edwin Maher is a New Zealand-born TV journalist who worked for CCTV International in Beijing before retiring in 2017.

Maher established his broadcast career in Australia, working many minor roles, particularly as a weatherman, in many cities before beginning a 25-year stint with Australian Broadcasting Corporation in 1979. He is mostly remembered in Melbourne for his use of a varied and creative number of viewer submitted pointers to highlight items when delivering the ABC's Victorian state weather forecast.

In 2003, China Central Television sought to expand its CCTV International to be more professional and accessible to Western audiences. CCTV senior executive Jiang Heping approached Maher, already working in China with CCTV as a voice coach, to become one of the first western anchors for the revamped network. Maher was offered the position because of his clear diction speaking English and his experience in voice coaching. Maher taught speaking in private lessons through his company Maher Media Services, lectured at the Royal Melbourne Institute of Technology, and even released audio lessons on voice. He accepted the job with CCTV and started in March 2004. Besides anchoring a news broadcast a few afternoons a week, his duties included voice coaching to the Chinese staff.

Maher answered criticism that he had become a paid mouthpiece for the Communist propaganda by saying he only read the news and was, "not trying to read into the news, not thinking about what is behind the content. Politically sensitive news, like any other news, has to be read clearly. That is my bottom line. Because I'm in China, some news may be regarded as politically sensitive or whatever, but that doesn't affect my interpretation of it to the audience." Maher also wrote articles for the English language China Daily newspaper about his experiences learning Mandarin Chinese.

Maher appeared in the 2003 Australian movie Bad Eggs as a news presenter reporting on the events at the end of the film.
