= Requestival =

Radio program on Triple J

- Running time: Monday to Friday, 6:00 am – 10:00 pm
- Home station: Triple J
- Hosted by: Various presenters
- Original release: 25–29 May 2020 – 26–30 September 2022

Requestival was an annual radio event on Australian youth broadcaster Triple J, beginning in 2020. For five days straight, between the hours of 6:00 am and 10:00 pm, the station exclusively played songs requested by listeners.

Significant air time was given to songs and artists that would never usually be played on the station. This included orchestral performances, musical theatre, television program themes, football club anthems, and famous speeches. In 2021, more than 80,000 song requests were submitted. The most recent Requestival was held in 2022.

== History and format ==
Requestival was similar in nature to Super Request, a nightly music request show that aired on Triple J from 1998 to 2001. To submit a request, users had to download the Triple J app, and share the reason for submitting their track. The first year saw 26,831 new downloads of the app.

The first Requestival was held from 25 to 29 May 2020. The station promised to "play songs that have rarely or never been played on Triple J." In that week, 105,430 song requests were made. The second Requestival was 10 to 14 May 2021. The third and most recent was held from 26 to 30 September 2022.

== Notable plays ==
After being banned from Triple J's Hottest 100 of 2014, "Shake It Off" by Taylor Swift was requested and played, making for the first time the American pop star was played on the station. Other artists from outside typical Triple J programming like Shannon Noll, Nikki Webster, Pitbull and Bonnie Tyler were featured.

Ludwig van Beethoven's "Symphony No. 5" and "Duel of the Fates" by John Williams were among several orchestral pieces that Triple J played, a complete departure from the typical alternative rock stylings on its rotation. Bardcore was also featured.

Multiple television program theme songs were played, including the intros to Antiques Roadshow, Grand Designs, Round the Twist, Pokémon and The Saddle Club. "Can I Borrow a Feeling?" from Simpsons' episode "A Milhouse Divided" was also played. Commercial jingles, like "You Wouldn't Steal a Car", were also highlighted, plus Nintendo's Mii Channel theme.

Sports team anthems, like "We Are Geelong" were played, as well as the Wide World of Sports cricket theme.

Triple J also played the entirety of Julia Gillard's misogyny speech, the first time Triple J has played something that is not a song, nor poetry.
