= Kara Kidman =

Australian radio personality

Kara Kidman is an Australian writer and broadcaster, specialised in political satire, radio and music.

== Career ==
For television, she wrote for the award-winning series The Chaser's War Against Everything broadcast on the Australian Broadcasting Corporation, the Andrew Denton-produced David Tench Tonight (Network Ten), and the top rating Sunrise programme (Channel Seven). In film, she is currently writing the feature-length fiction screenplay Radio Caroline, which was selected for the European Producers' EAVE workshops in 2008 and graduated with multiple special mentions.

Since 1995, Kidman has had articles published in the Sydney Morning Herald, Sunday Telegraph, the Chaser newspaper and jmag. In mid-2008 she started a regular column with news portal ninemsn.

Kidman has broadcast on national youth radio station triple j for six years, and most recently moved onto ABC presenting the Summer Overnights programme.
