= Mix Up (radio show) =

Australian radio music show

Mix-up is Triple J's long-running Saturday night dance music show, hosted by Kailyn Crabbe since 2023.

== Resident DJs ==
Since February 2008 the first hour has had a monthly resident DJ, followed by guests performing hour-long mixes.

Previous hosts have included Nicole Foote (?-2010), Nina Las Vegas (2010–2015), Sharif Galal (1995–2005), Andy Garvey (2017–2021), Latifa Tee (2021–2022) and Chris Fraser (2002–2004).
