= Majestic Fanfare =

Orchestral piece of music

- by Charles Williams
- Composed: 1935
- Recorded: 1943

"Majestic Fanfare" is a short orchestral piece of music written by the British composer Charles Williams in 1935. It is well recognised as the theme to ABC news broadcasts in Australia. Currently, it is being used on ABC NewsRadio, local radio stations, Radio National at the commencement of news bulletins each hour, and in a reworked form by the ABC News and regular news bulletins on ABC TV.

== 1982 version ==
On television, "Majestic Fanfare" was updated in 1982 to celebrate the ABC's 50th anniversary, using synthesisers. This version was used as the ABC News theme. It was tuned a semitone higher, to E major.

== 1988 version ==
In 1988, in accordance with the recommendation, and also to help celebrate the Australian Bicentenary, the ABC commissioned the Australian composer Richard Mills to re-orchestrate the tune in a more modern, Australian idiom. His arrangement was recorded by the Sydney Symphony Orchestra under Stuart Challender, at the Sydney Opera House. In the early 2000s, Mills' original pencil-written manuscript for the full and two abridged versions of the theme was donated to the music library of the University of Melbourne.

The theme is still used for ABC Radio news bulletins. Originally it was planned that Armiger's 2005 theme (below) would replace "Majestic Fanfare" on radio bulletins as well, but the plan did not proceed. A radio news inquiry later that year recommended that "Majestic Fanfare" should be either replaced or updated.

The piece, as used by the ABC, exists in two formats: an 18-second version that was used for many years, and a nine second abridged version that was usually used thereafter (although the 18-second version is still played on regional radio and on extended bulletins, such as the daily 7:00 am Local Radio bulletins).

== Other ABC News themes ==
In 1985, when ABC's evening news bulletin was replaced by The National, "Majestic Fanfare" was replaced by Alan Hawkshaw's "Best Endeavours", then also used by Britain's Channel 4 News bulletins.

In 1985, when ABC News was relaunched, "Majestic Fanfare" did not return. Since then, two Australian-composed tunes have been used. The first titled ABC News theme was written in 1985 by Sydney composers Tony Ansell and Peter Wall. It was used for 19 years. The original version of the current ABC News theme, composed by Martin Armiger and introduced on Australia Day 2005, incorporates some prominent elements of the original "Majestic Fanfare". A revised version of the theme was introduced in 2010, and another in 2017. The latest version, a remastered version of the Ansell and Wall theme, debuted in 2024.

In 1991, Paul McKercher and John Jacobs, audio engineers at the ABC-owned Triple J radio station, composed a remix of the original 1943 recording, using elements from N.W.A's "Fuck tha Police" and Prince's "Gett Off", which has been used to introduce the station's news bulletins since.

In 2010, Australian and English Drum and Bass act Pendulum released a remix of the 1985 theme which charted at #11 on the Triple J Hottest 100 for 2010. They play their version live exclusively in Australia, and have said that it is one of their favorites to play live.

The ABC TV News theme, written by Peter Wall and Tony Ansell, was used from 1986–2005. Then, in 2024, it was remixed and returned to use in daily television news bulletins.
