= Nicole Foote =

Australian radio presenter

Nicole Foote is a former Australian radio presenter. She hosted the hip hop show on Triple J and hosted Triple J's dance music shows Mix Up (radio show) and The Club until 2010.

Foote undertook a degree in Media Studies at Melbourne's RMIT University before beginning her career with Triple J.

Foote is currently Digital and Social Media Officer for the Australian Nursing and Midwifery Foundation in Melbourne.
