= One Night Stand (festival) =

Australian regional music festival

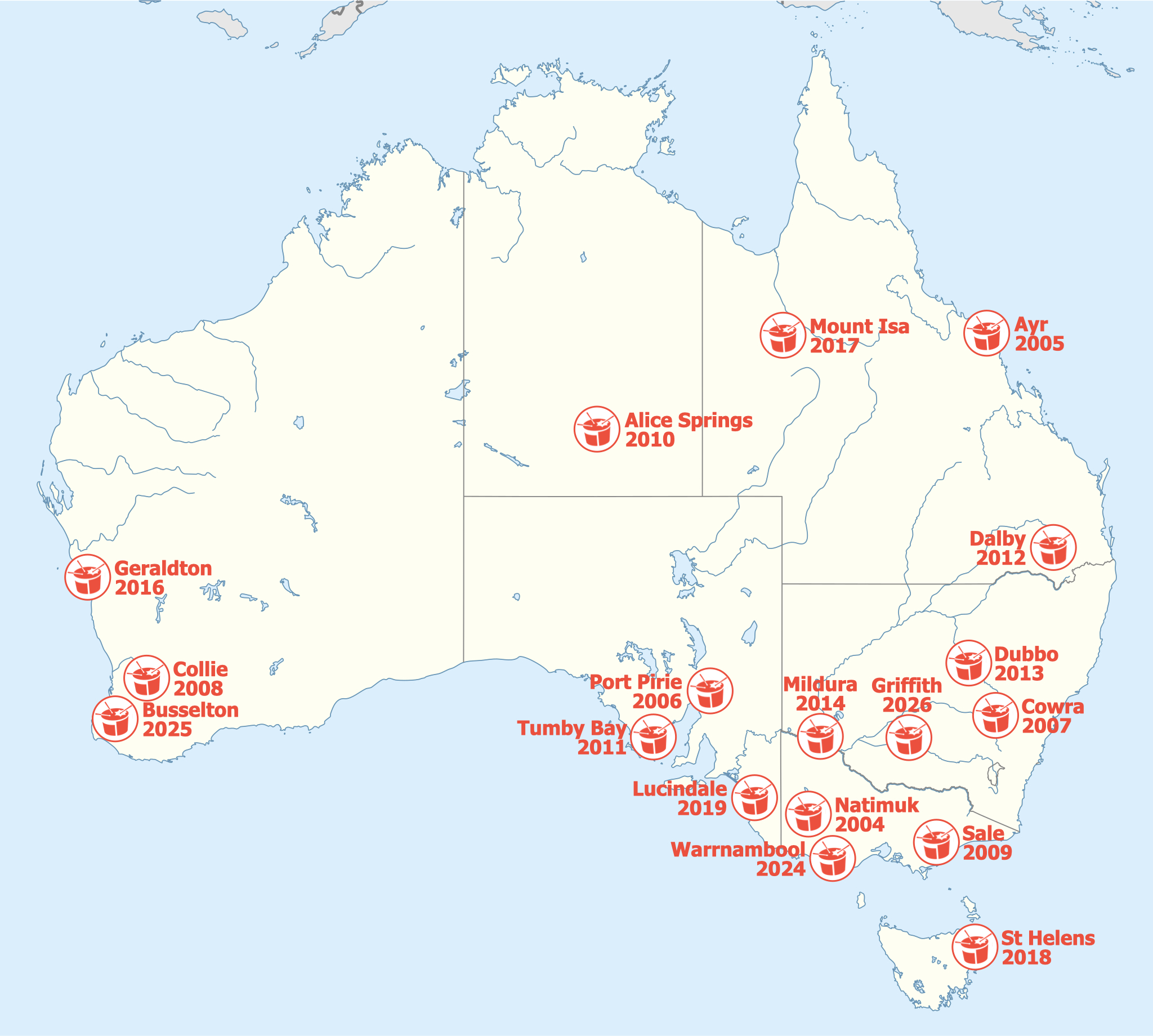
- Map of the towns where One Night Stand has been hosted, as of 2026.
- Frequency: Annual
- Country: Australia
- Years active: 2004–2019; 2024–present
- Inaugurated: 28 July 2004; 22 years ago (Natimuk, Victoria)
- Most recent: 5 September 2026 (Griffith, New South Wales)
- Organiser: Triple J

One Night Stand is an annual music festival held in various regional Australian towns that is organised and promoted by national youth radio station Triple J. It started in 2004 in Natimuk, Victoria, and ran every year until 2019, with one break in 2015 for the broadcaster's Beat the Drum event. One Night Stand did not run for four years from 2020 due to the COVID-19 pandemic, but returned to Warrnambool, Victoria in 2024 despite a series of major Australian festivals cancelling due to financial difficulties.

In the early years of the One Night Stand, the host town was selected in the form of a competition where residents of the town had to gain approval from their local government as well as find a suitable venue. Triple J would arranges the artists to perform – usually four to five high-profile Australian bands of a variety of genres, alongside a local band that had uploaded their music to Triple J Unearthed. In its initial run, tickets were free for all ages, however since 2024, they have been at a cost of at least $10, with all proceeds donated to charity. The festival's record attendance was its 2018 event in St Helens, Tasmania, reaching a capacity of 20,000 in a town of approximately 2,000.

== History ==
The concept of the One Night Stand was the brainchild of Triple J's then-marketing manager Louis Rogers, with the intention of raising the awareness and relevance of the radio station in regional communities. Backed by funding from the Australian Broadcasting Corporation, the first event was held in Natimuk, Victoria on Wednesday, 28 July 2004 and featured acts such as Grinspoon, the Dissociatives, Koolism and Eskimo Joe. The location was chosen from a pool of submissions sent to the station, which required entrances to produce a letter from their town's mayor, permission from a venue, a petition, and a souvenir. The Natimuk organising committee submitted a petition of 3,000 names, considerably more than the town's population of approximately 500. They also raised $30,000 in pledges from local businesses to support the event.

== List of events ==
Year	Date	Location	State/territory	Population (Note: Population figures are sourced from the Census in Australia nearest to the event date.)	Attendance (Note: Attendance figures are approximate.)	Performers	Ref.
2004	Wednesday, 28 July	Natimuk	Victoria	423	9,000	Grinspoon, The Dissociatives, Koolism, Eskimo Joe, Less Than Perfection	
2005	Wednesday, 18 May	Ayr	Queensland	8,334	10,000	Hilltop Hoods, Shihad, Katalyst, End of Fashion, A14	
2006	Wednesday, 12 April	Port Pirie	South Australia	13,206	10,000	The Living End, Kid Kenobi and MC Shurestock, Xavier Rudd, The Herd, Sector 12	
2007	Friday, 20 April	Cowra	New South Wales	10,358	10,000	Silverchair, FunkTrust, Midnight Juggernauts, Behind Crimson Eyes, Flatline Drama, Leap of Faith	
2008	Saturday, 26 April	Collie	Western Australia	7,404	15,000	Cog, Pnau, Faker, This End Up	
2009	Saturday, 30 May	Sale	Victoria	13,043	15,000	Hilltop Hoods, Eskimo Joe, The Butterfly Effect, Miami Horror, Children Collide, And Burn	
2010	Saturday, 27 March	Alice Springs	Northern Territory	21,622	6,000	John Butler Trio, Gyroscope, Bluejuice, Washington, Tjupi Band	
2011	Saturday, 2 April	Tumby Bay	South Australia	1,827	10,000	Birds of Tokyo, Art vs. Science, The Jezabels, Joshy Willo	
2012	Saturday, 2 June	Dalby	Queensland	12,299	15,000	The Temper Trap, (Note: The Temper Trap's headline set was cancelled due to extreme weather.) 360, Stonefield, Matt Corby, Mace and the Motor	
2013	Saturday, 13 April	Dubbo	New South Wales	32,327	18,000	Flume, The Rubens, Ball Park Music, Seth Sentry, Peoples Palace	
2014	Saturday, 17 May	Mildura	Victoria	30,647	17,000	Illy, Rüfüs Du Sol, Dan Sultan, Violent Soho, The Jungle Giants, Wzrdkid	
2015	Not held						
2016	Saturday, 9 April	Geraldton	Western Australia	31,982	15,000	Alison Wonderland, Boy & Bear, Urthboy, Alex the Kid	
2017	Saturday, 22 April	Mount Isa	Queensland	18,342	7,000	Thundamentals, The Smith Street Band, Tash Sultana, San Cisco, Lucky Luke	
2018	Saturday, 1 September	St Helens	Tasmania	2,070	20,000	Peking Duk, Vance Joy, Tkay Maidza, Middle Kids, Alex the Astronaut, The Sleepyheads	
2019	Saturday, 14 September	Lucindale	South Australia	555	15,000	Hilltop Hoods, Meg Mac, Ocean Alley, G Flip, Chelsea Manor	
2020	Not held						
2021	Not held						
2022	Not held						
2023	Not held						
2024	Saturday, 14 September	Warrnambool	Victoria	32,894	15,000	G Flip, Ruel, What So Not, Thelma Plum, Sycco, DICE, Flynn Gurry	
2025	Saturday, 24 May	Busselton	Western Australia	40,640	15,000	Spacey Jane, Luude, Ruby Fields, 3%, Blusher, Velvet Trip	
2026	Saturday, 5 September	Griffith	New South Wales	20,569	12,000	Ninajirachi, DMA's, Genesis Owusu, May-a, Beddy Rays	

== Awards and nominations ==
=== ARIA Music Awards ===
The ARIA Music Awards is an annual awards ceremony that recognises excellence, innovation, and achievement across all genres of Australian music. They commenced in 1987.

Year	Nominee / work	Award	Result	Ref.
2013	Triple J's One Night Stand	Best Original Soundtrack, Cast or Show Album	Nominated	
2014	Triple J's One Night Stand: Mildura	Best Original Soundtrack, Cast or Show Album	Nominated	
