= Scott Dooley =

Australian comedian (born 1980)

- Born: 29 March 1980 (age 46); Melbourne, Victoria, Australia
- Occupations: Comedian, radio presenter
- Years active: 2003–present

Scott "Dools" Dooley (born 29 March 1980) is an Australian comedian and radio announcer best known for his tenure with state-owned national youth network, Triple J and Nova 96.9.

== Career ==
Dooley began his career at Triple J as a work experience kid. Following an on-air revelation that he had a third nipple he then went on to be a guest on the Breakfast show with Adam and Wil where he starred in the Friday segment, "Are You Smarter Than Dools?". He has hosted the mid-dawn program - a common shift for new announcers - and the "Summer Nights" weeknight program which airs during the summer non-ratings period. On 7 January 2008, he joined Linda Marigliano to present the afternoon drive program from 3-5:30pm weekdays. Linda left the station on 5 December 2008 leaving Dooley as the sole presenter for the drive program, until his eventual departure on 4 December 2009.

In mid-2009, Dooley introduced a segment on his show, Annoying Dom Alessio, which consisted predictably of instances devoted to annoying fellow Triple J presenter Dom Alessio. A number of methods were used, including a Rubik's cube, a word puzzle, and hiding Alessio's car keys. Alessio exacted a degree of revenge on Dooley on 3 July 2009 when he posted Scott Dooley's personal mobile phone number on the internet as well as announcing it over the radio.

Dooley has also hosted jtv and appeared in JTV segments. He regularly appeared in the segment, "Throwing Stuff at Robbie Buck", which involved him and segment co-host Linda Marigliano ambushing fellow Triple J host Robbie Buck, throwing various items at him including a giant plush rabbit, and slapping Robbie across the face with a fish. The items used were usually suggested by a listener or viewer. The segment was later banned by ABC management.

In January 2010, Dooley joined Nova 96.9 where we co-hosted breakfast alongside Merrick Watts and Ricki-Lee Coulter (replaced by Monty from 2011), and finished in August 2011 due to disappointing ratings.

Dooley has hosted a range of different comedy gigs from Sydney's own Mic in Hand, to Australia's Raw Comedy, and has DJed at Sydney-based club "Purple Sneakers". He has also appeared on the DVD, Sydney Underground Comedy. He has also contributed to several Chaser Annuals, including the most recent, The Other Secret.

Dooley played for the Eastside Kings in the Robert Hunter Cup Australian rules match in October 2012, commemorating the anniversary of the death of Perth hip-hop MC Hunter. Scott was named man of the match for kicking 16 goals.

Dooley is also the voluntary chairperson of the Australian Goodfellas Appreciation Society, formed in 1998. The group investigates legitimate methods of bringing 'Wiseguy' language into mainstream media.

In 2017 Dooley began making cartoons with Jason Chatfield for the New Yorker.
