= Charlotte Hamlyn =

Australian journalist and news presenter

Charlotte Hamlyn (born c. 1987) is a Western Australian journalist, reporter, and news presenter for the Australian Broadcasting Corporation.

Hamlyn graduated from the University of Western Australia in 2008 with a degree in Communications/English, and started her media career working for a newspaper in Kalgoorlie. In 2008 and 2009 she was an exchange student at the University of Pennsylvania.

She started at the ABC in 2009, working as a journalist and reporter, travelling around Western Australia, and overseas for Foreign Correspondent.

She also regularly appeared on ABC Radio Perth, including co-hosting the weekend Breakfast program.

Hamlyn presented the ABC News for one month in 2013, filling in while James McHale was on leave.

She presented that news on Friday-Sunday from September 2020 until August 2021 when she went on maternity leave. She was replaced by Briana Shepherd, then returned in June 2022.

Hamlyn is a member of the board of the arts organisation Form.
