= Arnold Frolows =

Australian radio personality (1950–2025)

Arnold Frolows (15 January 1950 – 12 January 2025) was an Australian radio personality who was best known as being the music director at the Triple J station.

Frolows started his career in music in 1970 as a manager of Virgin record stores in London.

After returning to Australia in late 1974 he was hired as one of the foundation staff of Double Jay in Sydney, which began broadcasting in January 1975. He managed the record library and programming of the station. He temporarily returned to the United Kingdom where he was, among other things, head of A&R at Virgin Records UK.

In 1983, he rejoined triple j, where he took on the role of music director, a position that he held until his retirement from the station in 2003. During this time he also hosted Ambience, a program focussing on ambient music, until the late 1980s. During his last few years at the station, he was criticised in the music media as being "too old" to work at a youth station.

After leaving Triple J, Frolows remained with the ABC to become a programmer and music director at the new digital radio station ABC DiG, and ABC JAZZ.

Frolows died on 12 January 2025, aged 74, at Mona Vale Hospice in Sydney less than a month after being diagnosed with pancreatic and liver cancer.
