= Rosie Beaton =

Australian radio announcer

Rosie Beaton is an Australian radio announcer, best known for her work at Australian youth radio station Triple J.

In 2006, she started hosting Triple J TV Saturday on the ABC, which broadcast the music videos to the 20 most requested songs from Super Request during the prior week.
