= Briana Shepherd =

Australian journalist, reporter & news presenter

Briana Shepherd (born c. 1987) is a Western Australian journalist, reporter, and news presenter for the Australian Broadcasting Corporation. She has also worked as a model, ballet dancer and ballet teacher.

She attended Perth Modern School and, in 2005, at age 18, joined the New York City Ballet, the first Australian to do so. After suffering stress fractures, she left the company in 2009 and returned to Perth.

Shepherd obtained a Bachelor of Communications, majoring in journalism and broadcasting, and a Graduate Certificate of Radio Broadcasting from Edith Cowan University, and began working for the ABC News Perth as journalist and reporter in 2015.

Shepherd is the granddaughter of Terri Charlesworth, an inaugural dancer of the West Australian Ballet and founder of the Charlesworth Ballet Institute.
