= Triple J TV =

Australian television series

Triple J TV (stylised in all lowercase) was the name given to a series of Australian television programmes that aired on ABC1, ABC2 and online from July 2006, as a television spin-off of national radio broadcaster Triple J. The series focused on youth-oriented programming of music, interviews, comedy, currents affairs and documentaries.

Triple J manager Linda Bracken said the expansion into audiovisual programming was a natural progression for the brand, and that "for Triple J to remain relevant to a youth market we had to be more than a radio station." Founded as jtv, its first broadcast was on 28 July 2006, and the first live programme, a You Am I concert recorded live from the Hyde Park Barracks, Sydney, was hosted the following night. On ABC1, six hours a week was dedicated to Triple J TV content, mostly scheduled on Friday and Saturday nights.

== Programmes ==
Current programmes include:

- jtv live (various times on ABC1 and ABC2) – live concert events, similar to Triple J's Live at the Wireless show
- Hack Live – live forums on some of the biggest issues for young people in Australia, based on the Hack format.

Former programmes include:

- triple j tv with The Doctor (Monday night 9:05pm on ABC2 and late Friday night on ABC1) – Each week the Doctor is making a house call
- triple j tv (late Friday night on ABC1 and Monday night on ABC2) – a look at Triple J behind the scenes – including interviews, live performances and weekly Hack segment
- The Hack Half Hour (Monday night 8:30pm on ABC2) – Steve Cannane talks about the issues that impact your life
- jtv (Friday night on ABC1) – a behind the scenes look at Triple J, interviews, live performances, and weekly Hack segment
- jtv Saturday (Saturday morning on ABC1) – a music video show hosted by Rosie Beaton. This programme featured a countdown of the Top 20 Super Request tracks, as voted by Triple J listeners and jtv viewers
- jtv XL (Tuesday night on ABC2) – an alternate version of the previous Friday's edition of jtv, often with extended interviews
- The Urban Monkey with Murray Foote – Sam Simmons' comedy project.

== See also ==
- List of Australian music television shows
