= Ben Eltham =

Australian writer

Ben Eltham is an Australian writer, journalist, researcher, creative producer and social commentator based in Melbourne.

He is a lecturer in media and communications at Monash University's School of Media, Film and Journalism and was a fellow of the Centre for Policy Development and a research fellow at Deakin University's Centre for Memory, Imagination and Invention. Eltham studied neuroscience and philosophy at the University of Queensland, and completed a PhD at Western Sydney University on cultural policy. He has served as national affairs correspondent for New Matilda.

== Contributions ==
- Public policy of culture in Australia, particularly at federal level.
- When the Goal Posts Move: Patronage, power and resistance in Australian cultural policy 2013–2016 (Currency House, 2016).
- Popular media; journalist and essayist with New Matilda, contributor to Crikey, Guardian Australia, Overland, Meanjin and the Sydney Review of Books.
- Producer and festival director in Newcastle, Brisbane and Melbourne.

== Bibliography ==
Listing

=== Plays ===
- Eltham, Ben (2013). "The Pacific solution". In Cox, Emma (ed.). Staging asylum : contemporary Australian plays about refugees. Strawberry Hills, NSW: Currency Press.

=== Book reviews ===
Date	Review article	Work(s) reviewed
April 2013	"[Untitled review]". Australian Book Review. 350: 62. April 2013.	Scourfield, Stepen (2013). As the river runs. Crawley, WA: UWA Publishing.
