= Australian music industry =

Subconcept of Music industry (scot/341)

The Australian music industry refers to the collection of individuals, organisations, businesses and activities that are involved in the creation, production, distribution and promotion of music in Australia. The music industry encompasses a wide range of genres and styles of music including pop, rock, EDM, hip-hop, classical as well as featuring music from Indigenous artists.

== History ==
=== Early years and folk music (19th century to the early 20th century) ===
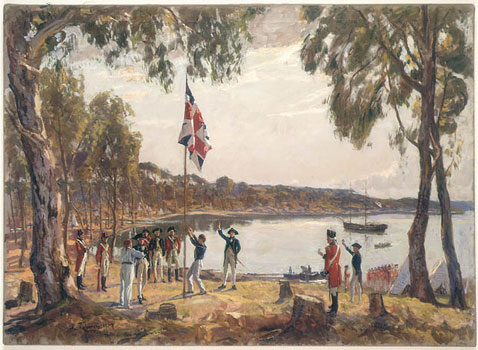
The founding of Australia on the 26 January 1788

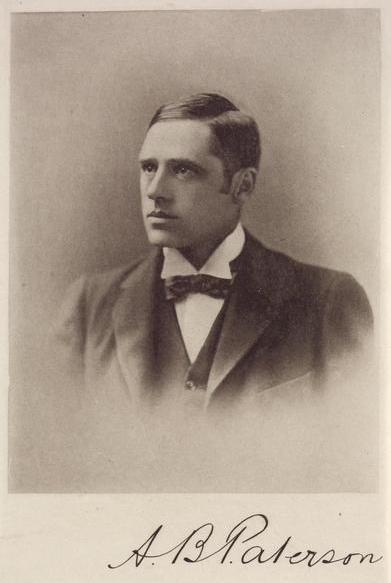
Banjo Paterson c. 1890

The Australian music scene during the Colonial Period of Australian history was characterised and influenced by European musical traditions. Folk songs and ballads were extremely popular at this time with such songs like 'Waltzing Matilda' and 'Botany Bay' becoming cultural icons. Musical influences from England, Ireland, and other parts of Europe began to have a significant impact and helped to shape much of the modern Australian music genre. Settlers from Europe brought over many new types of instruments such as violins, flutes and pianos, some of which had been in use within European classical music since the 17th Century. Two main forms of early Australian music developed from this; the convict and folk songs and the quintessential Australian 'bush ballads'. Convict and folk songs played an important role in expressing Australia's founding as a penal colony and the colonisation of the nation. Settlers brought over songs from their home countries but in addition to this convicts would sing about their experiences working in the Colony but also helped to convey themes about hardship, love and longing for home. Songs such as 'Moreton Bay' became famous for their reflection of convict life in Australia's early history. Similarly, bush ballads emerged as another prominent early Australian genre of music. These bush ballads gained popularity throughout the 19th Century and were particularly popular for its description of life in the Australian bush, and would often focus on themes relating to exploration, pioneer life as well as outlaws and bushrangers. Prominent artists such as Banjo Paterson and Henry Lawson had a significant impact on this genre with Paterson's 'The Man From Snowy River' written in 1890 and Lawson's 'Up the Country' being first published in 1892, becoming two of their most famous ballads.

=== Radio and recorded music (1920s to the 1940s) ===
With the creation of the radio by Guglielmo Marconi in 1897, it soon had a significant impact on the development of the Australian music industry and as a result, this era saw rapid development of technologies and changed the way that music was produced and consumed, not only in Australia but across the world. It also led to new opportunities and challenges for musicians and artists such as Peter Dawson, Harold Williams and Gladys Moncrieff would find large success in this era.

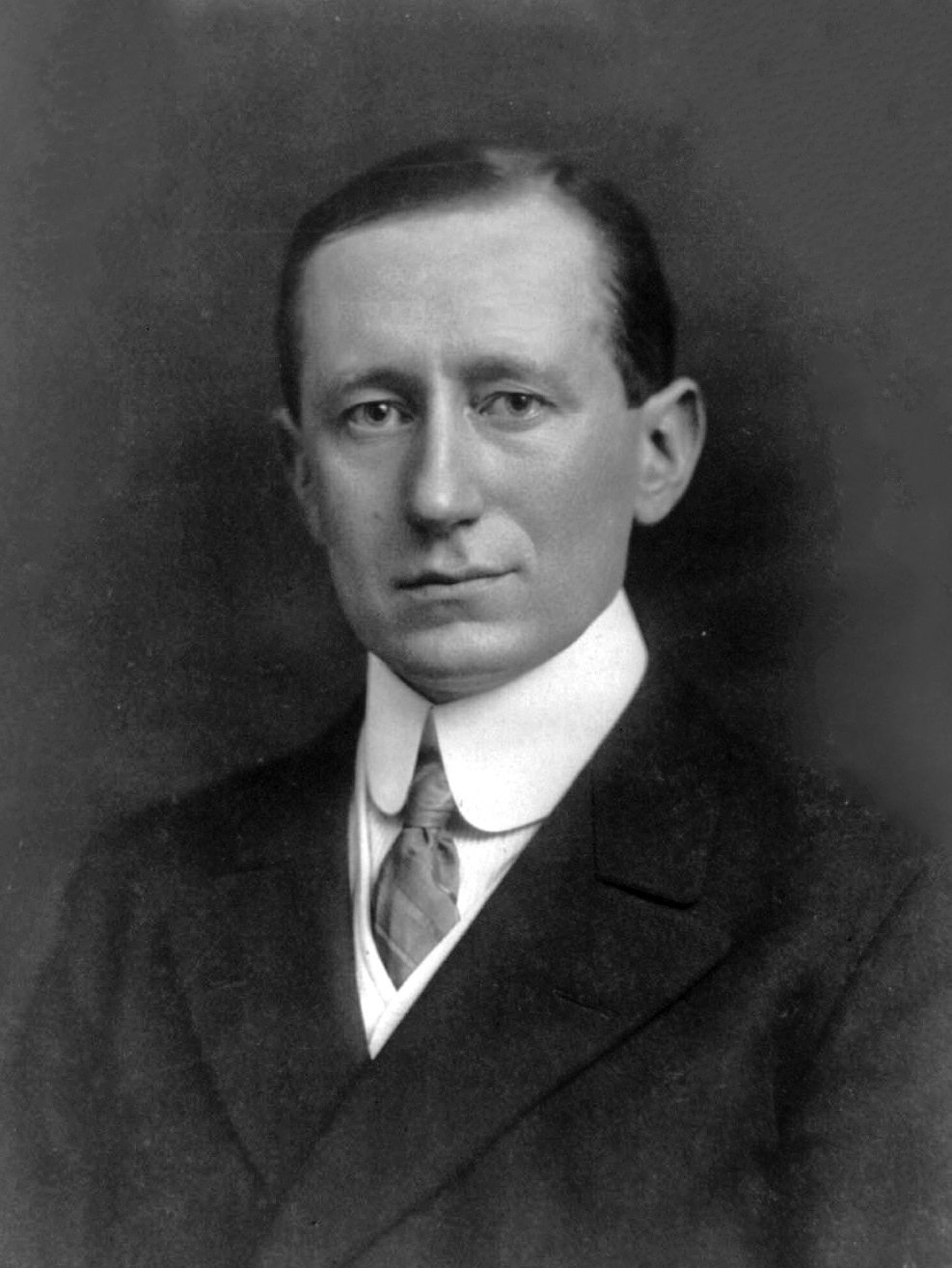
Guglielmo Marconi in 1908.

Radio broadcasting began in Australia in the early 1920s and the first public broadcast occurred on 23 November 1923 by Ernest Fisk from the Marconi station in Sydney. This saw a surge in radio popularity as it quickly became a source of entertainment and news. As such, broadcasting companies began to be created to try and capitalise on this popularity. One famous example is the Australian Broadcasting Corporation (ABC) which was formed in 1923 by the Australian Government to try and regulate the radio market but also to ensure that listeners had access to high quality music and radio services. In doing so this helped to pave the way for other such companies. Radio stations began to play music primarily to attract and retain new audiences and helped to encourage people to tune in regularly. Additionally, music broadcasting also provided a reliable way for radio stations to fill in airtime with live performances from well-known artists but also local ones which made it easier for upcoming artists to make money from their music career, allowing for growth in the music industry overall. Similarly, live-to-air broadcasts were becoming increasingly more frequent, with radio stations adopting segments in their broadcasts for live studio music sessions and by the mid 1920s to early 1930s they had become an integral feature in Australian public broadcasting. One notable feature of this period in the music industry was the 78 RPM records. This record format became more standardised and widely adopted in the early 20th Century. By the 1920s, the 78 RPM records were a common medium for broadcast in Australia as well as many other parts of the world. The 78 RPM records featured a wide variety of musical genres from this era, most notably jazz, blues and ragtime with Australian broadcasting using both local artists such as Frank Coughlan and worldwide artists such as Louis Armstrong and Benny Goodman. These types of records saw continued use throughout the 1940s, especially during wartime. They became an important part form of entertainment during the Second World War and became a popular form of entertainment for both soldiers and civilians.

==== The Second World War ====
During World War II, the use of music production in Australia saw a surge in popularity due to patriotic songs and music that aimed to boost moral and support the war effort. Similarly, music in Australia was also used for propaganda purposes and for recruitment. Many artists such as Smoky Dawson, Jack O'Hagan and Joy Nichols were extremely popular for their songs like 'Tears on My Pillow (1944)', The Road to Victory (1941) and 'The Cheer Up Hour' by Joy Nichols. Music played a crucial role in entertaining troops both at home and on the warfront. Various singers and bands would organise large gatherings and live performances for military personnel to boost morale. In particular, the Australian Entertainment Unit was established in 1941 to provide entertainment for troops and partnered with the United Service Organisations, the American organisation that aimed to provide morale primarily for American troops.

World War II also had a significant impact on the recording industry. It saw a massive change in genre, with swing and big band music gaining popularity, reflecting the cultural values of the other countries part of the Allies, like the United States and the United Kingdom. The presence of U.S. troops in particular, in Australia and on the warfront helped to greatly influence the music industry in Australia with American popular music and styles becoming more prevalent. The growth of the radio as a popular and common use for communications and entertainment during wartime meant that record labels turned more of their focus towards using radio as their main medium. The growing popularity of the radio helped to popularise music in Australia significantly more, because it was much more easily accessible and affordable for people.

In the aftermath of World War II, there had been significant changes to the music industry. The post-war era saw the rise of many new musical styles including the emergence of Rock n' Roll in the 1950s. Post-war society brought about a period of economic prosperity in Australia, leading to an increased disposable income among the population. This economic prosperity helped to spur on the spending of consumers on music, growing the industry even further.

=== Rock n' Roll and the 1950s ===
==== Emergence and Culture of Rock n' Roll in Australia ====
Rock n' Roll arrived in Australia in the 1950s primarily through imported records from the United States. Prominent Rock n' Roll artists like Elvis Presley, Chuck Berry, Little Richard and Bill Haley rapidly gained popularity in Australia through their recordings. However, there were also several Australian artists like Johnny O'Keefe and Col Joye were considered to be early innovators and it encouraged other Australian artists, like Lonnie Lee, to move away from covering American Rock n' Roll songs and move to create a more distinct Australian music scene. The success of these 'homegrown' artists demonstrated the growing demand for this type of music, particularly in younger generations, led to the growth of record labels, live music, and television as mediums for showcasing Australian artists. It showed that musicians were developing an Australian identity distinct from the initial American influenced one.

Record labels like Festival Records, founded in 1952, and television shows like Bandstand became crucial mediums for furthering the growing scene of local Rock n' Roll artists. Not only did they further popularise the genre, but they also created a vibrant culture across the country. The popularity also encouraged performance of music on a larger scale, like in community halls, dance halls and even large theatres. This meant that other artists looking to capatilse and contribute to this culture could do so with ease and with popularity. This is evidenced by the large number of subsequent bands that followed O'Keefe's and Joye's successes; bands like Lonnie Lee & The Leemen, Digby Richards & The R'Jays, and Alan Dale & The Houserockers to name just a few.

In 1953, an American entrepreneur named Lee Gordon brought over his "Big Show" promotions that involved displays of jazz bands, Rock n' Roll bands and other popular artists from the United States. Throughout the 1950s, the bringing over of international stars like Bill Haley and his Comets, Little Richard, Gene Vincent, and Eddie Cochran meant that it exposed Australian audiences to these genres and helped to establish concert culture in Australia, contrasted with smaller scale performances. This popularity helped to inspire Australian bands to perform live as the demand for these types of concerts was evident, and it meant that bands were willing to go on national tours, which only furthered the popularity of both the genre and industry.

==== Technological Shifts ====
While the early 1950s still had the 78 RPM as the dominant record, by the mid 1950s two new formats; the vinyl LP (long playing) and the 45 RPM single, had been introduced. The vinyl LP allowed for continuous listening which made it more accessible for people to listen to longer songs. It also allowed artists to release longer albums which in turn encouraged them to produce more music. The 45 RPM single was more affordable and meant that it was a good medium for producing songs that targeted younger people, who were the primary consumers of Rock n' Roll. It also helped spur record sales as it meant more people could buy them under these new formats, and also it meant that individuals bought more records for themselves rather than just one, due to this more affordable format.

==== Jazz in 1950s Australia ====
While Rock n' Roll was the predominant genre of the music scene during 1950s Australia, jazz was another strong, but understated aspect of the culture. It had largely been introduced in the early 20th century, in the years following World War I, but did not see national success until the Rock n' Roll scene of the 1950s. During the 1950s, bands like The Thunderbirds had grown out the local Victorian bebop and jazz scene by playing at Jazz Centre 44 in St Kilda, and producing tracks that reached national attention and popularity. In addition, the Australian Jazz Quintet, formed in 1953, found success in the Australian jazz scene but later moved to the United States where they gained even more popularity, combining with other jazz bands like the Dave Brubeck Quartet and even becoming one of the most popular bands in the American jazz scene. This demonstrated the thriving Australian music industry as well as the flourishing of other genres in the dominance of Rock n' Roll.
