= Triple J =

Australian national radio station

- Australia
- Frequencies: FM: Various; DVB-T: Ch. 28; DAB+; online

Programming
- Language: English
- Format: Alternative music
- Network: ABC Radio

Ownership
- Owner: Australian Broadcasting Corporation
- Sister stations: Double J, Unearthed, Hottest

History
- First air date: 19 January 1975; 51 years ago
- Former names: Double J, Double Jay, Double Jay Rock, JJJ 105.7FM (Note: The station's original name was 2JJ, which was written as Double J, Double Jay, or Double Jay Rock. This name was later adopted by its sister station founded in 2002, initially Dig Music, but now Double J.)

Technical information
- Licensing authority: Australian Communications and Media Authority

Links
- Webcast: Live stream
- Website: Official website

Triple J is an Australian radio station founded by the ABC in 1975. It caters to young listeners of alternative music with an emphasis on supporting Australian content, and lacks commercials because it is taxpayer-funded.

The station began broadcasting in Sydney as Double Jay (2JJ) on 19 January 1975. It was established by the Whitlam government, who wanted young Australians to connect with the ABC. Its fringe and often controversial rock music programming, plus a lack of advertisements, helped Double Jay stand apart from commercial networks, and the station rapidly garnered an audience. Its transmission was expanded nationally in 1989, following an upgrade to FM and a rebrand to Triple J (2JJJ). Throughout the 2010s, two spin-off digital stations were launched: Double J caters to more mature audiences, and Triple J Unearthed exclusively plays local unsigned musicians.

Despite declining radio ratings, Triple J remains a dominant tastemaker in the Australian music scene and has been historically praised for making popular culture accessible for young people in regional Australia. (Note: Attributed to the following references: For more, see Impact.) Unearthed provides airplay opportunities for independent artists, and has helped launch the careers of celebrated Australian musicians. The network also organises its own festivals like One Night Stand, and the Hottest 100, an annual poll of popular music. However, Triple J has long been criticised over its evolving sound and for promoting a homogenous music scene.

== History ==
=== 1970s ===
==== Plans ====
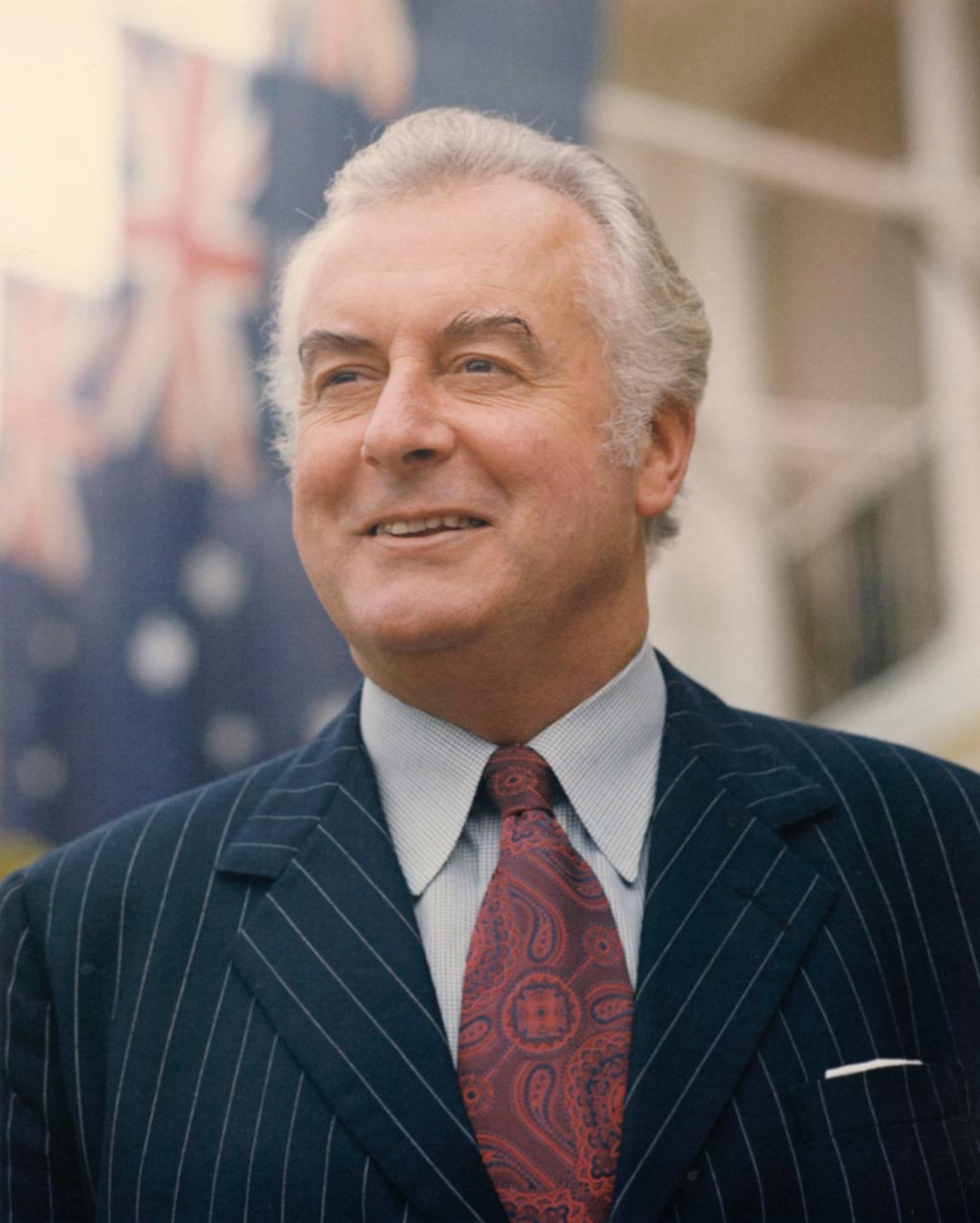
Gough Whitlam (1974), under whose government Triple J was established

The launch of a new, youth-focused radio station was a product of the progressive media policies of the Whitlam government of 1972–75. Prime minister Gough Whitlam wanted to set the station up to appeal to the youth vote, and the Australian Broadcasting Corporation (ABC), worried about its declining audience, "wanted a station for young people who would grow up to be ABC listeners." A new station was also a recommendation stemming from the McLean Report of 1974, which suggested expanding radio broadcasting onto the FM band, issuing a new class of broadcasting licence which permitted the establishment of community radio stations, and the creation of two new stations for the ABC: 2JJ in Sydney, also called Double Jay, and the short-lived 3ZZ in Melbourne.

Double Jay was intended to be the first link in Whitlam's planned national youth network, however, his administration was not re-elected in the 1975 federal election. The succeeding Fraser government's budget cuts to the ABC also halted this plan from moving forward. By the time Double Jay went to air, the Whitlam government was in its final months of office, and presenters on the station were frequently accused of left-wing bias in the months that followed.

==== First broadcasts ====
Double Jay commenced broadcasting at 11:00 am on Sunday, 19 January 1975, at 1540 kHz on the AM band. The station was restricted largely to the Greater Sydney region, and its local reception was hampered by inadequate transmitter facilities. However, its frequency was a clear channel nationally, so it was easily heard at night throughout south-eastern Australia. After midnight, Double Jay would use off-air ABC networks to increase its broadcasting range.

External media

Audio
- 1975-1985: 40 Years of Triple J, from ABC Listen, Part one of an audio documentary series on Triple J's history.

Video
- Double J: 1975, YouTube video featuring behind-the-scenes content from the 2JJ studio.

Its first broadcast demonstrated a determination to distinguish itself from other Australian radio stations. The first on-air presenter, DJ Holger Brockmann, notably used his own name, which, at his previous role at 2SM, was considered "too foreign-sounding". After an introductory montage that featured sounds from the countdown and launch of Apollo 11, Brockmann launched the station's first broadcast with the words, "Wow, and we're away!", and then played Skyhooks' "You Just Like Me 'Cos I'm Good in Bed". The choice of this song to introduce the station was significant, as it represented several important features of the Double Jay brand at the time. Choosing an Australian band reflected the network's commitment to Australian content at a time when American acts dominated pop stations. Further, the song was one of several tracks from the Skyhooks' album that had been banned on commercial radio for its explicit sexual content. The station chose to play songs that were banned from commercial airwaves, including the Rolling Stones' "Sympathy for the Devil". Because Double Jay was a government-funded station operating under the umbrella of the ABC, it was not bound by commercial censorship codes, and was not answerable to advertisers nor the station owners. In contrast, their Sydney rival, 2SM, was owned by a holding company controlled by the Catholic Archdiocese of Sydney, resulting in the ban or editing of numerous songs.

The internal politics of Double Jay were considered a radical departure from the formats of commercial stations. Double Jay's presenters had almost total freedom in their on-air delivery, and all staff participated in major policy decisions. For example, as former announcer Gayle Austin reflected: "In early March, women took over the station as announcers to celebrate International Women's Day", and "The listeners owned the station... and if they wanted to come to the meetings and join the debate, they were welcome".

In its early years Double Jay's on-air staff were mainly recruited from either commercial radio or other ABC stations. In another first for the industry, their roster also featured presenters who did not come from a radio background, including singer-songwriters Bob Hudson and John J. Francis, and actor Lex Marinos. Other notable foundation staff and presenters in January 1975 were Chris Winter, Gayle Austin, Marius Webb, Ron Moss, Arnold Frolows, Mark Colvin, Jim Middleton, Don Cumming, and Mac Cocker. Alan McGirvan was the breakfast announcer. Early staff also included Ted Robinson, Chris Winter, and Jim Middleton. Marius Webb and Ron Moss were the station coordinators, while Ros Cheney was programme coordinator, and they established the workplace as kind of collective. Producer and programmer Sammy Collins later said of Cheney that she was "more political and more dedicated than the men", and it was her presence which enabled female representation at every level. Double Jay was the first Australian music radio station to allow women DJs; one of these was Gayle Austin.

Before the launch of Double Jay in Sydney, Melbourne was the undisputed capital of music; the new station shone the light on musicians from Sydney and publicised gigs happening in the city. The station played artists such as Midnight Oil, Radio Birdman, INXS, Mental As Anything, and AC/DC long before they had exposure on any other media.

==== Rise in popularity ====
The station rapidly gained popularity, especially with its target youth demographic: media articles noted that in its first two months on air, Double Jay reached a 5.4% share of the total radio audience, with 17% in the 18–24 age group, while the audience share of rival 2SM dropped by 2.3%. Despite the poor quality of reception caused by the Sydney transmitter, the station still saw rapid growth. Austin explained that station staff threatened industrial action in July 1975 due to the transmitter issues, but officials of the BCB still refused to meet with Double Jay representatives. A new transmitter was not provided until 1980, following the transition to the FM band.

After the station hosted an open-air concert in Liverpool, New South Wales, in May 1975 featuring Skyhooks and Dragon, city's Sun newspaper claimed that attendees were "shocked" by "depictions of sexual depravity and shouted obscenities", which allegedly caused women in the audience to clap their hands over their ears, prompting Coalition frontbencher Peter Nixon to call for the station to be closed down.

During the 1970s, the music programming varied a lot and depended on the presenters and producers, with various factions favouring different artists and styles. There is also archival evidence of marijuana being used by presenters while on ABC grounds.

=== 1980s ===
On 11 July 1980, Double Jay began broadcasting on the FM band at a frequency of 105.7 MHz (again restricted to within the Greater Sydney region) and became 2JJJ, referred to as Triple J. The first song played was another track then banned from commercial radio, "Gay Guys" by the Dugites. To celebrate the relaunch, the station organised a concert in Parramatta Park on 18 January 1981, featuring Midnight Oil and Matt Finish, who performed to a crowd of 40,000 people.

On 19 January 1981, AM transmissions ceased, and Triple J became an FM-only station. It was not until 1989 and 1990 that the ABC was finally able to expand the Triple J network to Adelaide, Brisbane, Canberra, Darwin, Hobart, Melbourne, Newcastle, and Perth. During this period, there were attempts to establish a playlist for the whole station.

=== 1990s ===
External videos
- Triple J Goes National, A news report about the station's expansion, featuring interviews with presenters and listeners.

Throughout the 1990s, Triple J commenced expansion to more regional areas of Australia and, in 1994, it was extended to another 18 regional centres throughout the country. In 1996, the total was brought to 44, with the new additions including Launceston, Tasmania; Albany, Western Australia; Bathurst, New South Wales and Mackay, Queensland. Triple J's most recent expansion was new addition to include Broome, Western Australia in 2005.

From the 1990s until around 2010, Triple J "set the cultural agenda, particularly for Australian music". Grunge music came to the fore, and bands such as Spiderbait, the Beasts of Bourbon, and The Cruel Sea attained critical and popular success, boosted by Triple J's playlist.

In 1990 the station took strike action after ABC management censored the N.W.A. song "Fuck tha Police". In retaliation, the presenters played N.W.A.'s song "Express Yourself" 82 times in a row. Triple M director Barry Chapman was appointed as general manager to oversee Triple J's network expansion and instil cultural change. His tenure generated controversy, most notably in 1990, when all senior announcers in the Sydney office were fired, including the most popular presenters Tony Biggs and Tim Ritchie. Several protests were held outside its William Street studios, including a 105-hour vigil, and a public meeting that packed the Sydney Town Hall with angry listeners spilled out onto the street. Listeners were concerned Chapman would bring a more commercial flair to Triple J with music programming that was less dominated by Sydney acts.

External videos
- Pauline Pantsdown Controversy, An ABC News report about the censorship of "Back Door Man" from Triple J.

In 1997, satirist Pauline Pantsdown, a drag queen parodying the conservative politician Pauline Hanson, released the song "Back Door Man", which rearranged the words of Hanson to imply she was a proud gay activist. The song became the station's most popular request in the following nine days. Hanson's lawyers swiftly took the ABC to court for defamation, claiming the song "gave rise to imputations that she is a homosexual [and] a prostitute." The broadcaster unsuccessfully appealed the injunction, and were forced to stop playing it, despite listeners voting it number five in Triple J's Hottest 100 of 1997.

=== 2000s ===
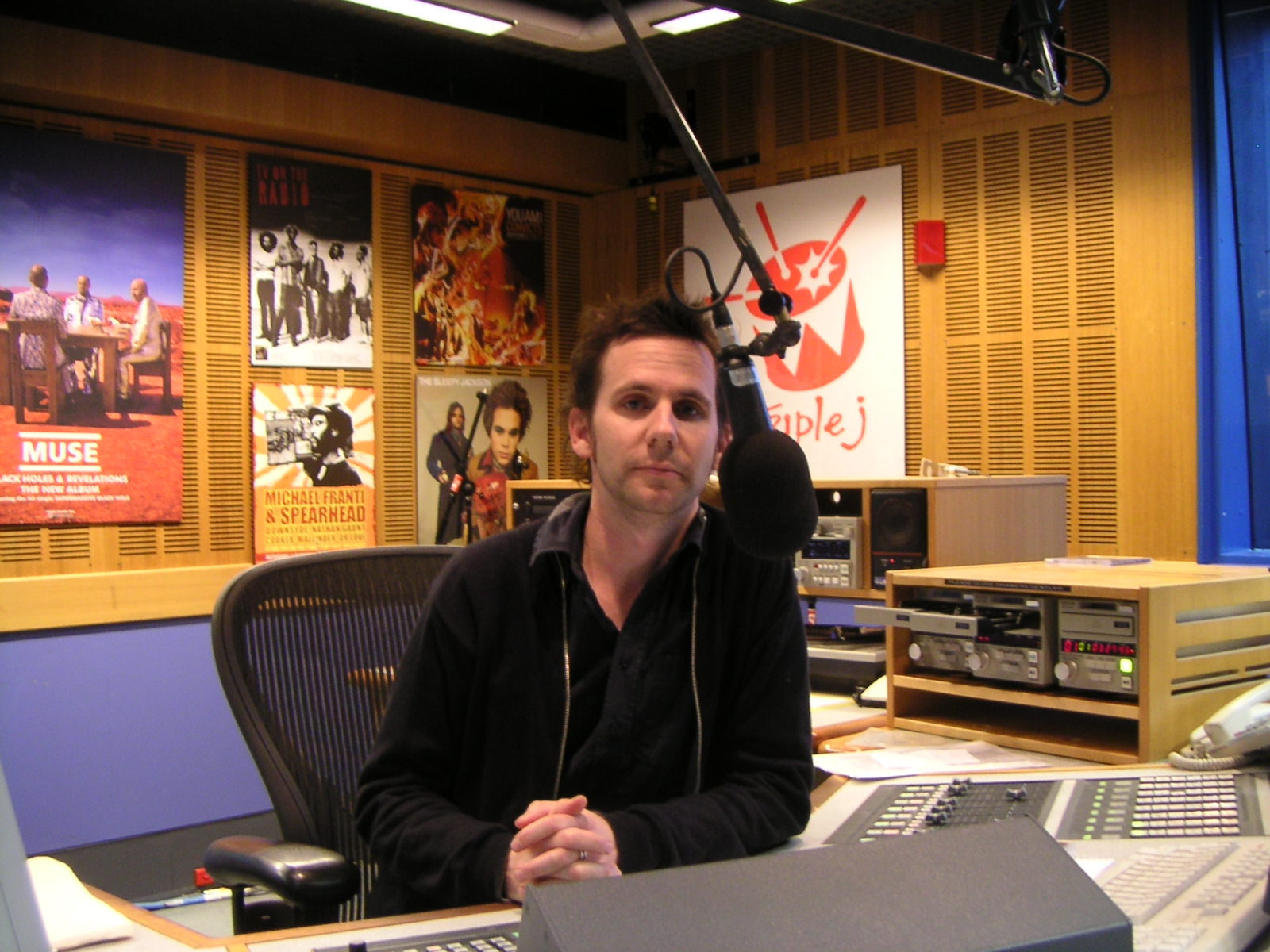
Robbie Buck was the presenter of Home and Hosed, Triple J's flagship Australian music show, from 2003.

In May 2003, Arnold Frolows, the only remaining member of the original Double Jay staff of 1975, stepped down after 28 years as Triple J music director. He was replaced by presenter Richard Kingsmill, who joined the station in 1988. Kingsmill had previously worked as a producer and presenter at 2SER alongside Robbie Buck and Tracee Hutchison.

In late 2004, the station's promotion for their annual Beat the Drum contest – in which listeners were to send in the most remarkable places they could promote the Triple J logo – caused brief controversy after it issued a promotional image of the former World Trade Center draped with a huge drum flag. A notable winner of the competition was a Queensland farmer who formed a drum logo-shaped crop circle in his wheat-fields.

Triple J launched its own music publication, Triple J Magazine, in 2005. It was initially published quarterly, then monthly, but in 2013 the magazine ceased publication by News Custom Publishing. It returned as an annual edition, produced in-house, until 2016.

Adapting to the digital streaming age, in 2004, the station began to release podcasts of some of its talkback shows, including Dr. Karl, This Sporting Life, and Hack. In 2006, Triple J launched Triple J TV, a series of television programs broadcast on ABC1 and ABC2 including music videos, live concerts, documentaries, and comedy, as well as a behind-the-scenes look at Triple J's studios.

In 2006, the website for Triple J Unearthed was launched. It remains a hub for unsigned Australian artists to upload their music and be heard by the Triple J team. A digital radio station, which only plays content from the website, was launched in 2011.

=== 2010s ===
In 2014, ABC's Dig Music digital radio station was rebranded under the Triple J umbrella, becoming Double J on 30 April 2014. The new station featured both new music and material from Triple J interview and sound archives. Former Triple J announcer Myf Warhurst, who hosted the inaugural shift, said "it's for people who love music, and also love a bit of music history". The first song played on Double J was Nick Cave and the Bad Seeds' "Get Ready for Love", followed by live performances by Australian artists Kate Miller-Heidke and Paul Dempsey.

In ratings released in August 2015, Triple J was the highest or equal first in Sydney, Melbourne, Brisbane, Adelaide and Perth in the 25–39 demographic.

Triple J attracted significant news coverage in the lead-up to the Hottest 100 of 2017, when the station announced they would move the countdown date from Australia Day (26 January) to the fourth weekend of January. The decision was taken after a listener petition and survey indicated that the majority of listeners would like it changed, owing to sensitivities about celebrating the arrival of the First Fleet. The Hottest 100 has successfully broadcast on the fourth weekend of January (but not January 26) since 2018, with prominent campaigners A.B. Original calling the move "a step in the right direction".

On 5 September 2018, Lunch presenter Gen Fricker was sexually assaulted live on air by a man who infiltrated the ABC's Ultimo headquarters. It was alleged the perpetrator, 31-year-old Kieren Gallagher, stalked Fricker for months, before grabbing and kissing her, then fleeing once security were alerted. She returned to work one month later. The broadcaster said they tightened office security since the incident.

=== 2020s ===
Triple J began 2020 with a major overhaul of its hosts, replacing longtime presenters including Gen Fricker and Tom Tilley with younger talent including Bryce Mills and Lucy Smith, in what was billed as a "generational shift for the station".

triple j
(@triplej)
tweeted:

did it hurt? when you aged out of the youth radio station

31 August 2021

In August 2021, the Triple J Twitter account posted a riff on a popular pick-up line, which attracted widespread criticism and accusations of ageism. Writing for NME, journalist Andrew Street said the controversy renewed discussion about the lack of airplay of older artists on the station, with many being "deemed Double J–ready" in their mid-20s.

As radio ratings continue to decline across the board due to the rise of streaming media, Triple J saw a 2.5% decline of listeners across the major capital cities between late April and June 2022. Compared to the audience share of 7.7% in the Sydney 18–24 year-old demographic in 2021, the station had dropped to 4.4% in 2022.

In December 2023, it was announced that Richard Kingsmill, who had been the music director of Triple J and its sister stations, would be leaving after 35 years at the ABC. During his tenure, he doubled the amount of airtime given to Australian artists, from 30% to 60%, and increased the station's audience from 980,000 in 2006 to 3 million in 2022. Several news outlets, including The Guardian and Mumbrella, wrote pieces about Kingsmill's importance to the Australian music scene, with Nathan Jolly of the latter calling the broadcaster "the most important single figure in the history of Australian music", on par with Michael Gudinski and Molly Meldrum.

Former head of the Nova network, Ben Latimer, was announced as the new head of radio at the ABC amidst a major board restructuring, causing audible "shock and disappointment" in a Sydney staff meeting. Several presenters also announced their departures, and long-running late night music show Good Nights was axed.

In May 2024, Triple J hosted the inaugural Bars of Steel Live event in Parramatta, showcasing hip hop and rap artists from all across Western Sydney. In September, the station also revived its One Night Stand regional music festival, which had not run since 2019. It took place in Warrnambool, Victoria to a sold-out crowd.

In January 2025, the station celebrated 50 years of existence. To celebrate the event, Double J broadcast the very first day of Triple J's 1975 broadcast, on 19 January 2025 from 11 am to 11 pm, with a two-hour simulcast on Triple J. Holger Brockmann introduced the replay. Rage also featured a birthday special in January 2025.

A change to higher rotation for new music resulted in a jump in listenership in March 2025.

== Content ==
=== Music and identity ===
Our brief was to provide an alternative to the mainstream, with a heavy emphasis on Australian content. We were to provide opportunities for live and recorded performances by young Australian musicians, and play (shock! horror!) album tracks from all the genres of music that weren't being heard on commercial radio.

— Gayle Austin, Off the Dial

In the station's early years, Triple J primarily played alternative rock and pop rock, but the range of music programmed was far wider than its commercial rivals, and included experimental and electronic music, progressive rock, funk, soul, disco, reggae, and the emerging punk and new wave genres of the late 1970s. Triple J's specialist music programs showcased music rarely heard on Australian radio, like world music, Japanese pop (Nippi Rock Shop), and ambient music (Ambience). Meanwhile avant-garde programs like Sunday Afternoon at the Movies, Watching the Radio With The TV Off and Shipbuilding For Pleasure blended interviews and location sound recordings to create layered narratives.

Triple J initially positioned itself as a punk brand due to its fringe and often controversial music programming. The first song played on the station, "You Just Like Me 'Cos I'm Good in Bed" by Skyhooks, was banned from other Australian broadcasters due to its salacious content. The station had also been playing N.W.A's protest song "Fuck tha Police" for six months before ABC management caught on, who banned it in 1990. As a result, Triple J staff went on strike and played "Express Yourself" for 24 hours straight.

As of 2024, the station mostly plays alternative pop, surf rock, indie rock, modern rock and rap music. Its weekly specialist music programs include the Hip Hop Show, Core (heavy metal, hardcore and punk), Prism (alt-pop, K-pop and J-pop), Soul Ctrl (neo soul and R&B) and Country Club (country and folk). Meanwhile, House Party and Mix Up feature live DJ mixes.

Triple J is frequently criticised for its evolving music programming; it has been described as Australia's "most discussed, divisive station", and that it's a "national pastime" to critique the broadcaster. Observers say the station has lost its punk identity by playing more international pop stars, and playing it too safe with its music programming. Music writer Shaad D'Souza wrote that Billie Eilish's win in the Hottest 100 of 2019 was an outcome "unthinkable even a few years earlier".

List of most played artists on Triple J by year
| Year | Artist | Country | Ref. |
|---|---|---|---|
| 2014 | Peking Duk | Australia | |
| 2015 | Tame Impala | Australia | |
| 2016 | Unknown | | |
| 2017 | Lorde | New Zealand | |
| 2018 | Middle Kids | Australia | |
| 2019 | Billie Eilish | United States | |
| 2020 | Tame Impala | Australia | |
| 2021 | Billie Eilish | United States | |
| 2022 | Spacey Jane | Australia | |
| 2023 | Fred Again | United Kingdom | |
| 2024 | Lime Cordiale | Australia | |
| 2025 | Spacey Jane | Australia | |

=== Australian music ===
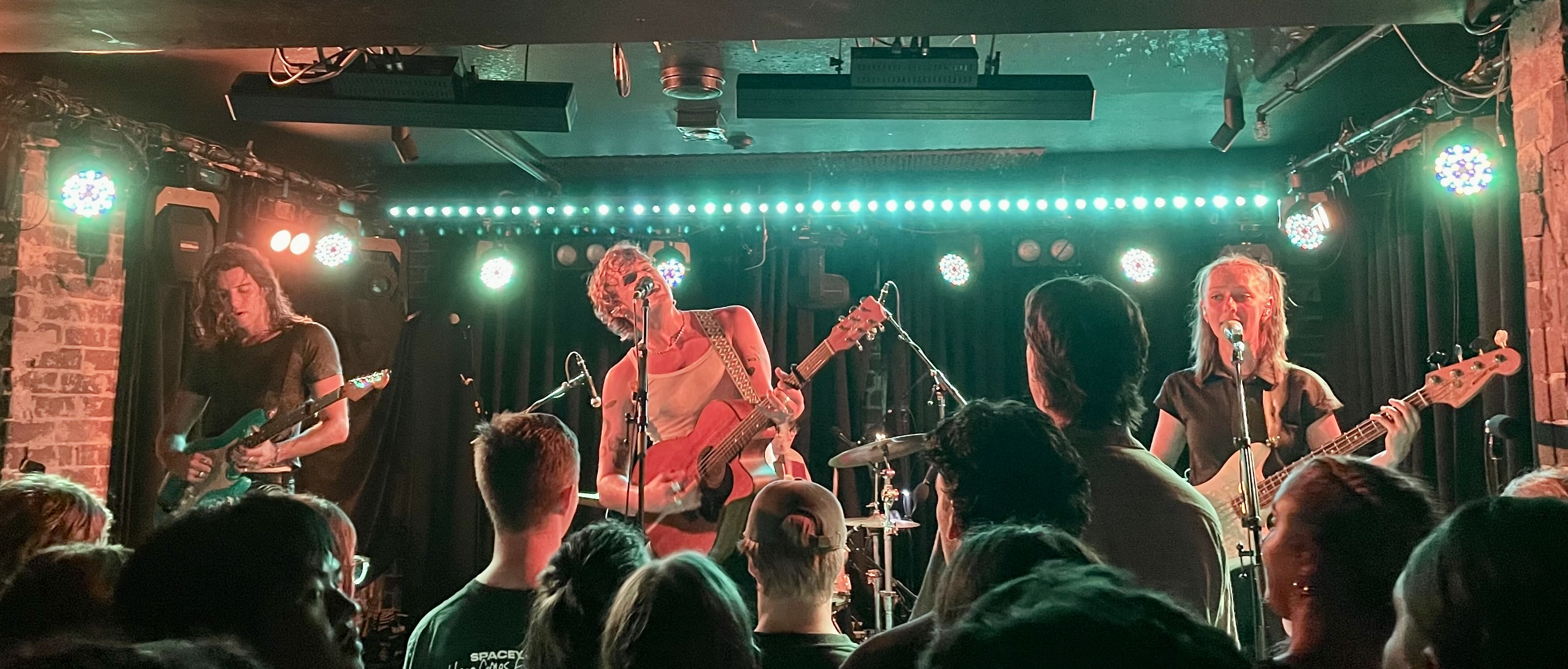
Spacey Jane were the most played act on Triple J in 2025.

Triple J plays far more Australian music than its commercial rivals, and was a pioneer in its coverage of independent music. The station has always had a 40% Australian music quota, well above commercial radio's 25%; mainstream radio has long been criticised for not playing enough local content. Early presenter Gayle Austin reflected in 2006 that before Triple J, "Australian music didn't have much production put into it because there wasn't much money made out of it."

The flagship Australian music program on Triple J, Home and Hosed, has its origins in The Australian Music Show from the 1980s. It continues to showcase emerging and established local artists and promote upcoming gigs. The program has long been seen as a vital forum for domestic artists. Meanwhile, Blak Out showcases the latest music from Indigenous Australians.

In 2025, out of the 50 most played artists on Triple J, 70% were Australian. The most played act was Fremantle indie rock band Spacey Jane; the year prior, it was Sydney indie pop duo Lime Cordiale.

=== Live music ===
Among the station's live music segments is Like a Version, which sees an artist performing an original and a cover song; Live at the Wireless, which broadcasts recordings from Australian concerts and festivals; and Bars of Steel, a web series featuring emerging rappers freestyling.

=== News ===
News updates on Triple J are written and edited from a youth-oriented perspective. Triple J is the only ABC radio station that doesn't carry bulletins from the state or national news desk—instead, it produces its own with the assistance of ABC resources. Triple J Hack, the station's flagship current affairs program, is broadcast every weekday evening and features original investigations into relevant issues affecting young Australians.

=== Music data ===
Launched in 2006 by Paul Stipack, J Play was an online archive of every song played by Triple J over 12 years. It showed an artist's trajectory from their first airing to full rotation. The privately owned site was acquired by Seventh Street Media (Brag Media) along with music publications Tone Deaf and The Brag, in early 2017. Owing to changes in the music industry, J Play's usefulness diminished, and it ceased operation in January 2019. The Brag Media retained the J Play database of 40,000 songs, 11,000 artists, and 15,000 playlists. In June 2024, Sydney software engineer Harrison Khannah launched Triple J Watchdog, a similar online resource that tracks each week's top songs, musicians and genres, with additional statistics like artists' country of origin, pronouns and their amount of Spotify monthly listeners.

== Branding ==
The Triple J name is stylised in all lowercase, a marketing decision made in 1981 that according to writer Ben Eltham of Meanjin, is one that reflects "a particular world-view that takes brand identity seriously". Marketing staff will vet press releases and posters to ensure the broadcaster name is written as triple j. In November 2024, the logos of Triple J and its sister stations were updated for the first time in 15 years. The long-running slogan of Triple J is "We love music", though "We love Australian music" has also been used.

The Triple J news theme introduced in 1991 is a remix of the ABC's "Majestic Fanfare".

The Triple J News theme is a remix of the ABC News theme, "Majestic Fanfare", originally performed by the Queen's Hall Light Orchestra. It was remixed in 1991 by Paul McKercher and John Jacobs, who included a drum sample from Prince's "Gett Off" and the record scratch from N.W.A's "Fuck tha Police", a nod to the track after it was banned by ABC management. This unconventional news theme is another core element of the Triple J brand identity– McKercher wanted to create a sound that was distinctly uncommercial.

== Presenters ==
Triple J has been presented by a long lineage of emerging comedians, journalists and musicians—many started their careers on the station. For example, Doug Mulray, honed his distinctive on-air style on Triple J before moving to Triple M in the 1980s and becoming one of the highest-paid radio personalities in the country. Dr. Karl began his presenting career on the station in 1981 and continues to host a weekly science segment several decades on. Wil Anderson, John Safran and Myf Warhurst have both become successful comics and television presenters who started on Triple J. After presenting Lunch, Zan Rowe transitioned to Double J and various television projects, as was the case for Annette Shun Wah who went on to become an SBS executive. Pioneer of House Party from the mid-2000s, Nina Las Vegas went on to establish her own independent record label, NLV Records.

From July 2026, presenters on daily programs include:

- Breakfast: Abby Butler and Tyrone Pynor
- Mornings: Lucy Smith
- Lunch: Dave Woodhead
- Drive: Luka Muller and Jordan Barr
- Hack: Dave Marchese
- Home and Hosed: Anika Luna

== Initiatives ==
=== Unearthed ===
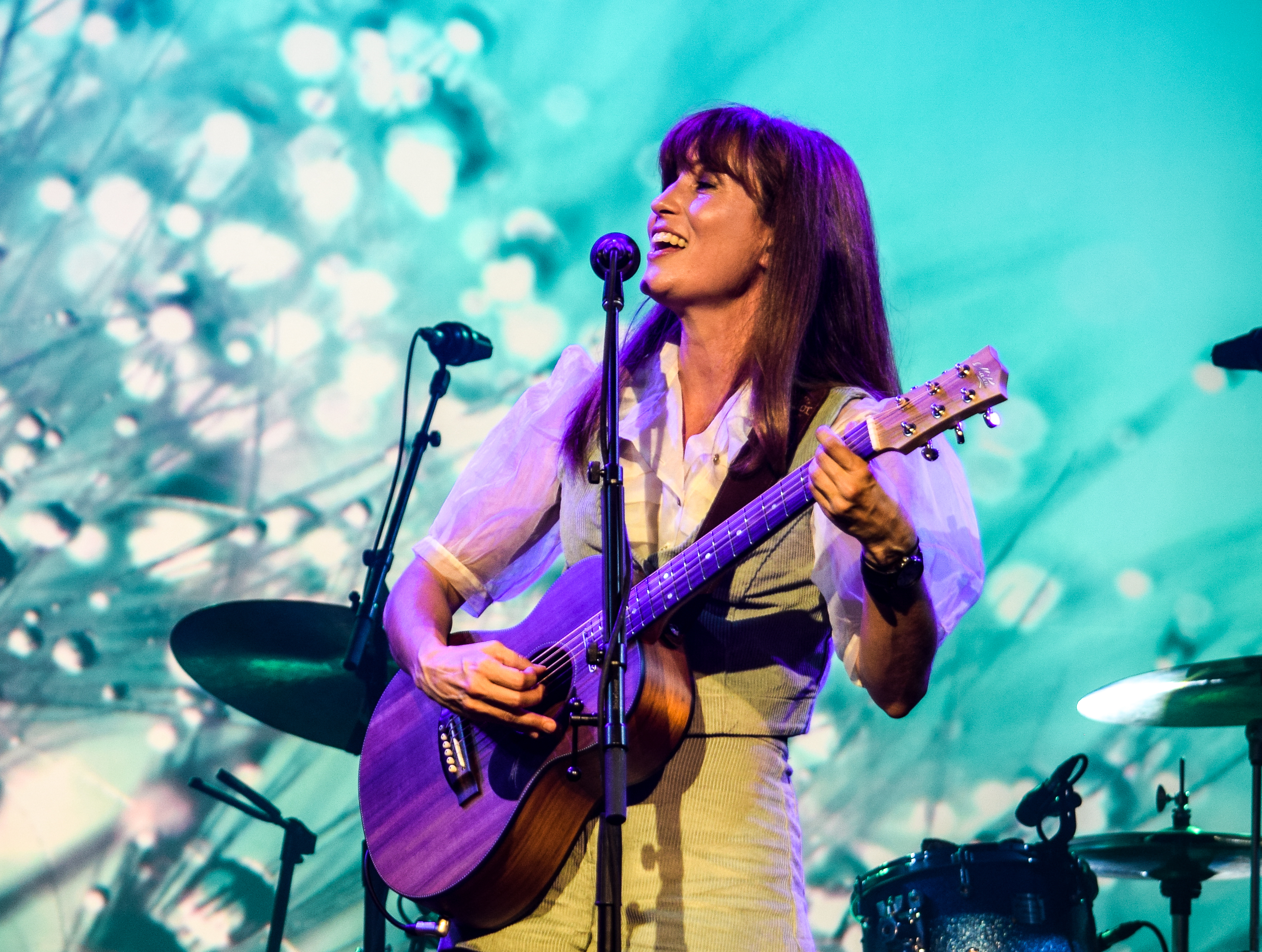
Missy Higgins says her 2001 Unearthed success led to her initial record deal and subsequent success.

Unearthed is Triple J's initiative to support unsigned Australian artists. It began as a talent competition in 1996, which helped discover artists like Killing Heidi, Missy Higgins and Grinspoon. The Unearthed website was launched in 2006, allowing artists to upload their music to be heard by Triple J staff. It grew to host 30,000 artists and 250,000 users in its first five years. In 2011, an Unearthed digital radio station was launched, which only plays content from the website.

Unearthed regularly hosts competitions to improve the recognition of independent artists, like Unearthed High, aimed at musicians in high school, with winners receiving mentoring, recording opportunities and airplay on Triple J. Past winners have included now-celebrated acts like Hockey Dad (2014), The Kid Laroi (2018), Genesis Owusu (2015) Japanese Wallpaper (2014) and Gretta Ray (2016).

=== Ausmusic Month ===
Every November, Triple J celebrates Ausmusic Month, where Australian acts are heavily promoted across all its stations. A number of events are organised, including major concerts—in 2010 this included headlining acts Bag Raiders and Ball Park Music and in 2018 featured performances from Paul Kelly, Crowded House and Missy Higgins. Triple J hosts the J Awards during the month, and encourages listeners to wear their favourite band's t-shirt on Ausmusic T-Shirt Day, an initiative which the station founded in 2013.

=== J Awards ===
The J Awards are an annual awards ceremony held in November each year to celebrate Australian music. As of 2024, the five award categories are Australian Album of the Year, Australian Music Video of the Year, Australian Live Act of the Year, Unearthed Artist of the Year and Double J Artist of the Year. The most recent winners for Album of the Year are Drummer by G Flip in 2023, Zorb by Sycco in 2024, I Love My Computer by Ninajirachi in 2025, and Redstar Wu & the Worldwide Scourge by Genesis Owusu in 2026.

== Radio events ==
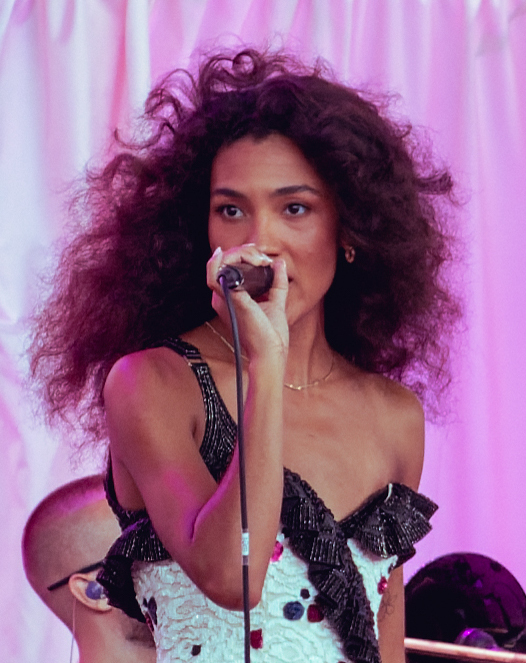
- British singer Olivia Dean is the latest artist to top the Hottest 100.
  Triple J Hottest 100: Broadcast since 1989, the Hottest 100 is an annual poll of the previous year's most popular songs, as voted by listeners. Promoted as the "world's greatest music democracy," the countdown has run for over 30 years and attracts millions of votes annually. From 1998 to 2016, the Hottest 100 was held on Australia Day (January 26), but in response to controversies surrounding the date, the countdown has been held on the fourth weekend of January from 2017 onwards. The station also occasionally runs speciality Hottest 100 countdowns, such as the Hottest 100 of the 2010s in 2020, and the Triple J Hottest 100 of Australian Songs in 2025.
- Requestival: Broadcast annually from 2020 until 2022, Triple J held Requestival, where they only played listeners' song requests for five days straight. Significant airtime was given to songs and artists that would never usually be played on the station, including "Symphony No. 5" by Ludwig van Beethoven, "Shake It Off" by Taylor Swift (which was notably banned from the 2014 Hottest 100), "Rasputin" by Boney M., the theme songs to TV programs Antiques Roadshow and Saddle Club, the entirety of Julia Gillard's misogyny speech, and the Geelong Cats club song, "We Are Geelong".
- Impossible Music Festival: Broadcast annually from 2005 to 2008, the Impossible Music Festival consisted of 55 live music recordings played consecutively over one weekend. The lineup of artists each time was decided by listeners, and recordings were derived from festivals, concerts, pub gigs and studio sessions.

== Music festivals ==
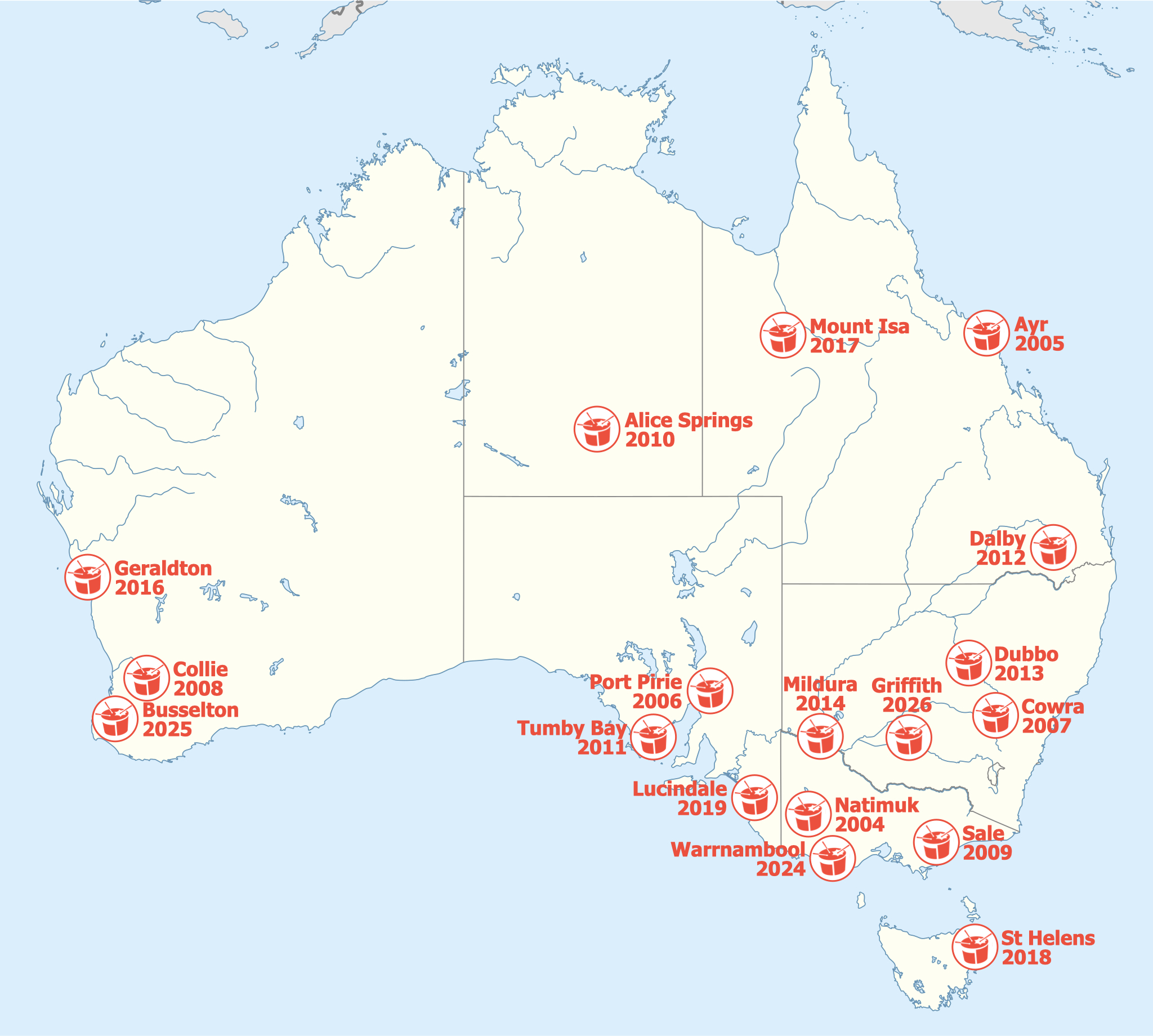
Map of the towns where One Night Stand has been hosted, as of 2025.

Triple J routinely sponsors live music events in Australia, and has organised its own festivals and concerts, including:

- One Night Stand: Hosted almost every year since 2004, One Night Stand is an all-ages concert series held in different regional towns. It is up to the audience to nominate their regional towns to host the event, needing to provide examples of local support, including community (signatures), local government (council approval), and a venue for the concert.
- Bars of Steel Live: Based on their web series, Triple J hosted a free concert in Parramatta in May 2024, featuring hip hop and rap artists from all across Western Sydney. The inaugural lineup included Youngn Lipz, A.Girl, Becca Hatch and Unearthed competition winners. Triple J also hosted several songwriting and music production workshops.
- Beat the Drum: On 16 January 2015, to commemorate the 40th anniversary of Triple J, a one-off concert called Beat the Drum was held at the Domain, Sydney. Hosted by Peter Garrett, the list of performers, all of whom are the beneficiaries of the station's support, included Hilltop Hoods, the Presets, the Cat Empire, You Am I, Daniel Johns, Joelistics, Ball Park Music, Adalita, Vance Joy, and Gotye. A recording of the event was released on CD and DVD in May 2015, which won the ARIA Award for Best Original Soundtrack, Cast or Show Album.
- Triple J 50 On Tour: In November 2025, to celebrate the station's 50th year, Triple J held five concerts in five cities featuring four artists on each bill, with Courtney Barnett headlining in Hobart, Teen Jesus and the Jean Teasers in Newcastle, Tkay Maidza in Adelaide, Mallrat in the Gold Coast, and Ninajirachi in Torquay.
- Tribute concerts: In November 2009, Triple J hosted a tribute concert series for Paul Kelly called Before Too Long, which ran over two nights at Melbourne's Forum Theatre. In 2011, another live set of shows was presented, this time honouring Nick Cave, in a show called Straight to You. Both events were recorded to produce two commercially successful live albums.

== Impact ==
=== Artist discovery ===
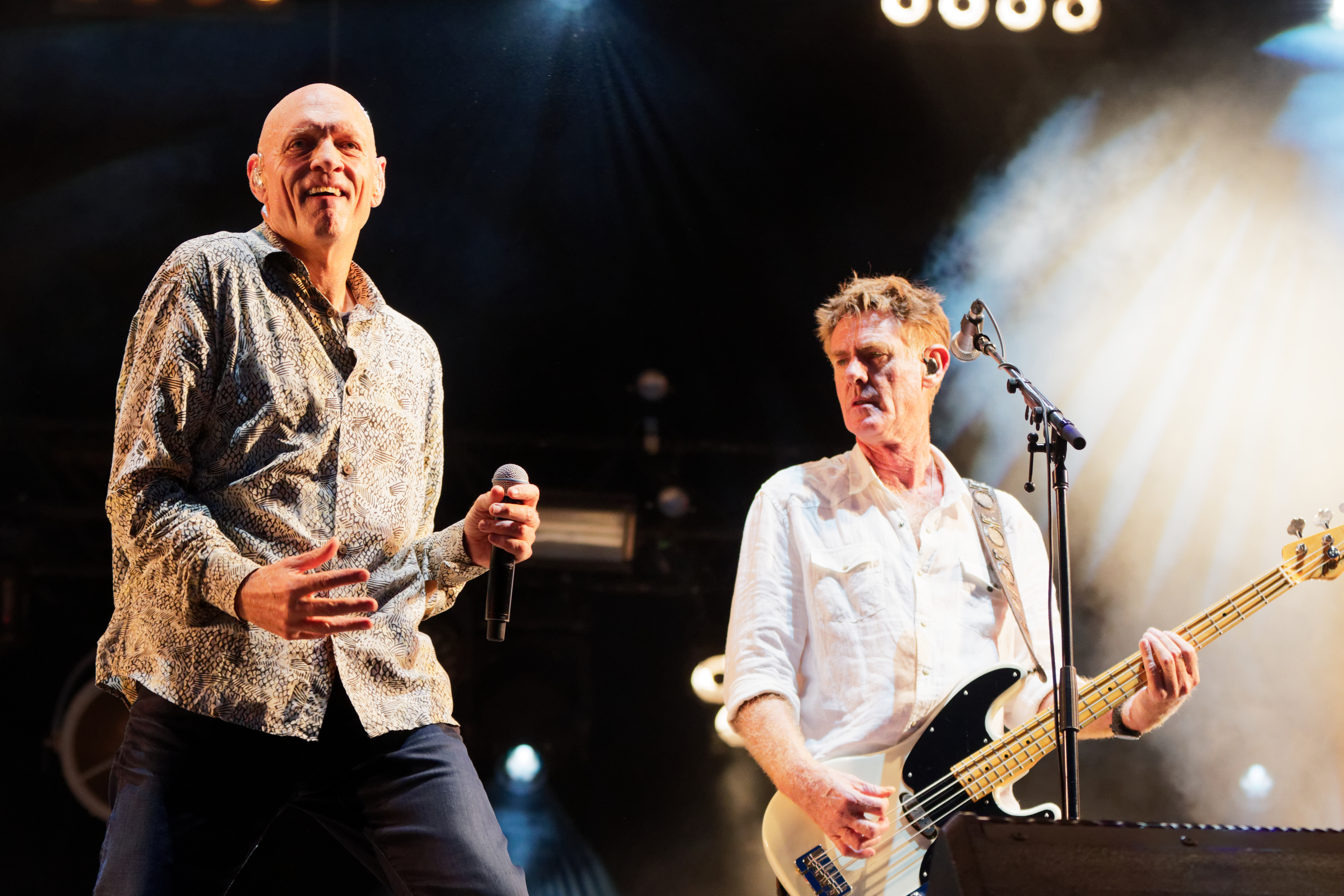
Triple J was the first radio station to play Midnight Oil, frontman Peter Garrett recalled.

Covering 98% of Australia, Triple J has substantial influence over the national music market and is a tastemaker. Since its inception, emerging artists it has championed have become some of the country's most celebrated musical acts, including Midnight Oil, Nick Cave, Silverchair and the John Butler Trio. The station is also credited for creating local audiences for international acts, like Blondie, Devo, Garbage and the B-52s—Triple J was the first station in the world to play the latter's debut single "Rock Lobster".

More recently, artists platformed via the network's discovery channel, Triple J Unearthed, have included Flume, Missy Higgins, Vance Joy, Gang of Youths, Grinspoon and the Kid Laroi. Columnist Peter Vincent has written Triple J is "the envy of the music scenes across the Western world, for its ability to deliver new local talent to mass audiences, quickly."

The station has faced accusations of having a monopoly on new music, with emerging acts heavily relying on their support for career growth. Notable musicians including Matty Healy of the 1975 and Andrew Stockdale of Wolfmother have both publicly criticised Triple J, despite enjoying extensive support from the station. Perth rock outfit End of Fashion claimed that reduced airplay effectively ended their band's career.

In the mid-2020s, there has been renewed debate about the role of Triple J in a music industry dominated by streaming services.

=== Blacklisting ===
Triple J has occasionally blacklisted prominent musicians from airplay. Indie rock band Sticky Fingers used to receive significant support from the station until 2018 when they were removed from rotation, after a controversial Hack interview where frontman Dylan Frost downplayed allegations of violence. Their later releases have been relatively unsuccessful in Australia, and they have since only been played in Requestival and various Hottest 100 countdowns. Previously, the station also blacklisted Bliss n Eso after member Esoterik posted misogynistic photos to Instagram.

=== Homogenisation of music ===
Triple J has routinely been accused of promoting a homogeneous Australian music scene. Concerns were aired in Fairfax newspapers in 2014 with notable musicians, remaining anonymous, claiming artists needed the "Triple J sound" to be played on the station. Julie Fenwick of Vice defined this sound as "a sort of indie surf, slightly pop persuasion." Musician Whitley believed the broadcaster had failed to "challenge and present new ideas for the youth of Australia." Music director Dave Ruby Howe acknowledged there were some similar sounds on discovery platform Unearthed, but bands purely chasing airplay would get caught out.

=== Music business ===
On any given day, hundreds of thousands of listeners across the country are tuned in. Label owners, promoters, publicists and musicians follow the station with relentless fascination, as its playlist and musical preferences can literally make, delay, or break careers in the notoriously fickle music business.

— Andrew McMillen, The Discovery Channel, 6 January 2012

Triple J has sponsored Australian live music events since its inception, and has organised its own festivals like Bars of Steel Live and One Night Stand, the latter of which has run in small regional towns since 2004. In 2024, Triple J and Double J supported over 60 festivals and tours of international and domestic artists. They promote such events in their radio programs and commercials and on their social media channels.

In its early years, Triple J also played an important role in record distribution. Labels would previously only import recordings that they knew would yield good commercial return, leaving them often unwilling to take risks on local releases. For example, Australian distributors initially refused to offer 801's live album 801 Live in the country, but constant airplay on Triple J made the record the highest selling import album of the year. Thus, the label decided to release it locally.

=== Alternative radio ===
As cringe-worthy as Triple J can sometimes be, the network is irreplaceable; it fills a unique niche in the Australian cultural landscape.

— Ben Eltham, The Curious Significance of Triple J

Triple J's programming approach was copied by succeeding commercial stations. Nova, conceived as a competitor youth station, had a "clearly borrowed" catalogue from Triple J, but was slightly more conservative with its song selections.

Former Australian Recording Industry Association staffer Danny Yau said that Triple J's nationalisation from the early 1990s created a new role for local community radio stations, particularly Sydney's FBi and Melbourne's 3RRR, to fill the broadcaster's gaps with more niche regional content.

== See also ==
- List of radio stations in Australia
- BBC Radio 6 Music, British alternative music station
- CBC Radio 3, Canadian indie music station
- FM4, Austrian youth broadcaster
- MDR Sputnik, German youth broadcaster
- Mouv', French youth broadcaster
