= List of Triple J programs =

This is a list of programs broadcast on Australian youth radio station Triple J. For a list of presenters, see List of Triple J presenters.

On weekdays, Triple J broadcasts at least five mainstay programs. On weekends, during the summer, and on public holidays, usually only three mainstay programs are broadcast daily, each with different presenters and longer time slots.

- Breakfast: 6:00 am–9:00 am
- Mornings: 9:00 am–12:00 pm
- Lunch: 12:00 pm–3:30 pm
- Drive: 3:30 pm–5:30 pm, then 6:00 pm–7:00 pm (Note: No additional hour on Fridays.)
- Hack: 5:30 pm–6:00 pm.
- Home and Hosed: 7:00 pm–9:00 pm. (Note: Monday to Thursday.)

Following this standard programming, Triple J broadcasts a variety of specialist programs, usually catering to specific music genres and styles.

== Local music ==
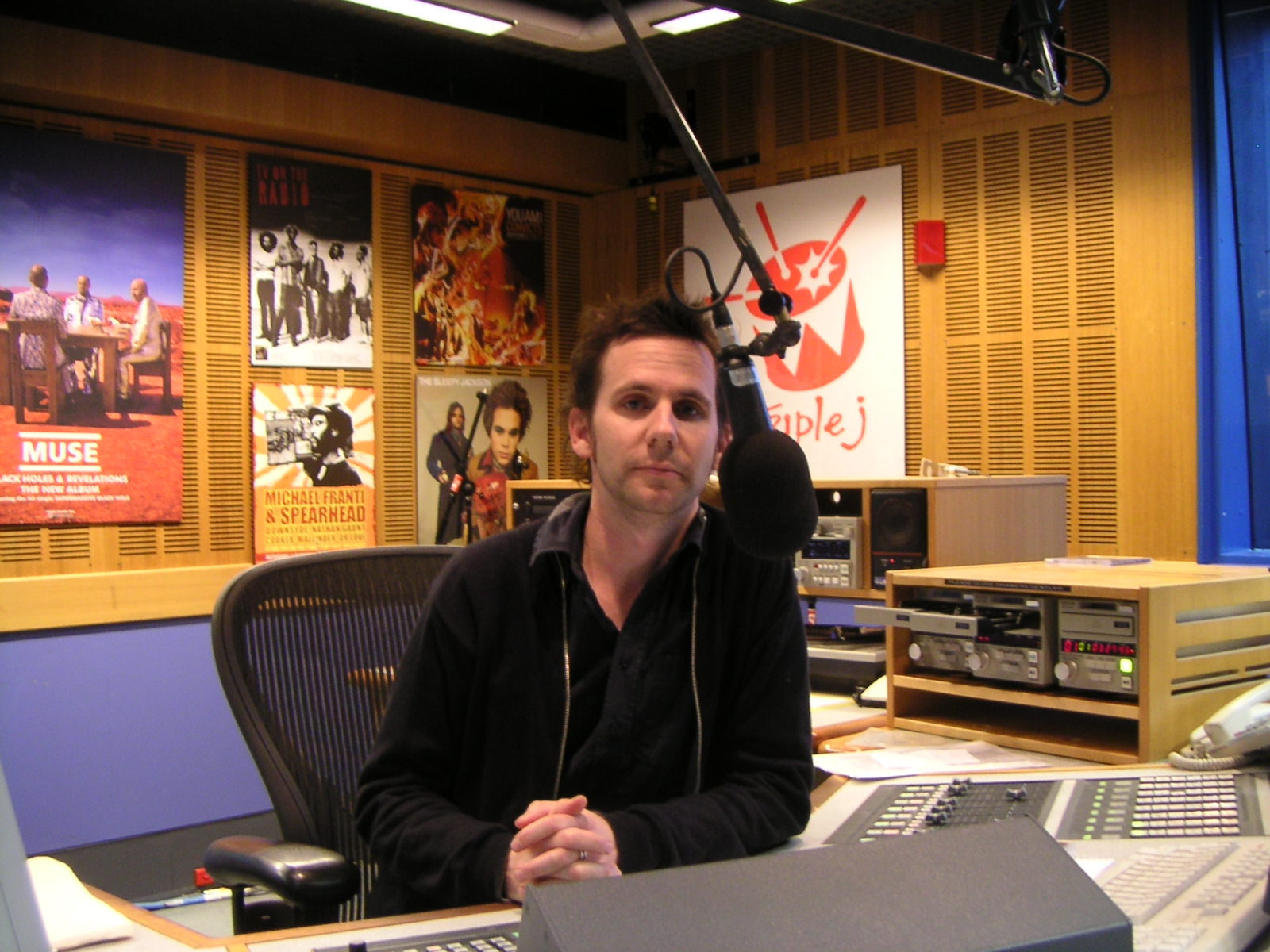
Robbie Buck, one of the original hosts of Home and Hosed, in the Triple J studio.

Currently hosted by Anika Luna, Home and Hosed is the flagship Australian music program on Triple J where significant airtime is given to unsigned musicians. The show also includes interviews with musicians, premieres of new releases, and gig guides, and is broadcast most weekday evenings. Home and Hosed is the successor of the Australian Music Show, which was hosted by Richard Kingsmill from 1991.

Launched in 2021, Blak Out is a weekly show playing music from Indigenous Australian artists. It covers all genres and includes interviews with emerging talent.

== Specialty music ==
Triple J has several genre-specific programs broadcast typically once per week. In 2026, these shows include:

- Soul Ctrl: neo soul and rhythm & blues music; Monday nights, launched in 2022
- Core: heavy metal, hardcore, punk, emo and shoegaze music; Tuesday nights, launched in 2025
- Prism: alternative pop, K-pop and J-pop music; Wednesday nights, launched in 2025
- Hip Hop Show: hip hop music; Thursday nights, launched in 2004
- House Party: live DJ mixes from the presenter; Friday and Saturday nights, launched in 2008
- Doof: Australian electronic music; Friday nights, launched in 2026
- Mix Up: DJ mixes from local and international guests; Satuday nights
- Country Club: country music; Sunday nights, launched in 2026

Previous programs that have been discontinued or moved to Double J include:

- Ambience: ambient music
- Friday Night Shuffle: dance and club music; replaced by The Nudge in 2021
- Nippi Rock Shop: Japanese pop music
- The Nudge: DJ mixes; launched in 2021, ended in 2025
- Radio Funktrust: groove and funk music, launched as The Groove Train
- The Racket: heavy metal music; launched as Three Hours of Power in 1990, ended in 2024
- Roots 'n All: contemporary blues and roots music; launched in 2004, ended in 2021
- Short Fast Loud: punk rock, hardcore punk, metalcore and post-hardcore music; launched in 2003, moved to Double J from 2025
- Something More: electronic music; launched in 2014, ended in 2021
- The Sound Lab: experimental, dubstep, ambient, and glitch music; launched in 2003, ended in 2014
- World Music Show: world music.

== Live music ==
Live at the Wireless is a weekly segment that broadcasts live performances from gigs and festivals around the country. The recordings are later made available online, and are sometimes published to streaming platforms by the artists.

Like a Version is a Friday weekly segment during Breakfast which features musicians and bands performing two songs; one original and one cover of the artists choice. The segment was created by Mel Bampton as part of the morning show Mel in the Morning. During the onset of the COVID-19 pandemic in Australia, Like a Version went on hiatus for the first time in 16 years.

== News and factual ==
Triple J has their own independent news team, specifically covering news and issues that are relevant to young Australians, such as the cost of living and climate change, as well as general music news. A short news break is delivered on the hour during weekdays, and every half-hour during Breakfast.

- Hack: The station's flagship current affairs program; broadcast every weeknight during the Drive time slot. Young people across the country are encouraged to text or call in for discussion among a panel of experts depending on the relevant news topic.
- Science with Dr. Karl: The science hour with Dr. Karl, launched in 1981, is Triple J's longest running segment by far. Listeners are invited to ask questions to the doctor, which he answers, occasionally with the help of guest professors or academics. It broadcasts during Mornings every Thursday. A live show at the Enmore Theatre was hosted with Lucy Smith in August 2025.
- Talkback Classroom: Broadcast from 1998 to 2003, Talkback Classroom was a program where secondary school students from around Australia interviewed various prominent politicians, business and community leaders on current affairs issues. The program now airs on ABC Radio National.

== Talk ==
=== Breakfast ===
Breakfast is Triple J's flagship mainstay program. It began in the late 1980s, with hosts Russell Thorpe ("Rusty Nails") and then Maynard fronting the time slot. In the early 1990s, Helen Razer and Mikey Robins hosted the program– they are retrospectively considered one of the station's most popular duos ever.

Adam Spencer and Wil Anderson hosted from 1999 until 2004. The pair were known for their unconventional sense of humour, highlighted by regular segments including Mary from Junee, Essence of Steve, and Are You Smarter Than Dools?

In 2005, Jason Whalley and Lindsay McDougall ("The Doctor"), of the duo Jay and the Doctor from punk rock band Frenzal Rhomb, took over as hosts of Breakfast. They would occasionally host radio plays, including Space Goat. For 2007, former Lunch presenter Myf Warhurst joined the duo as a permanent member of the team.

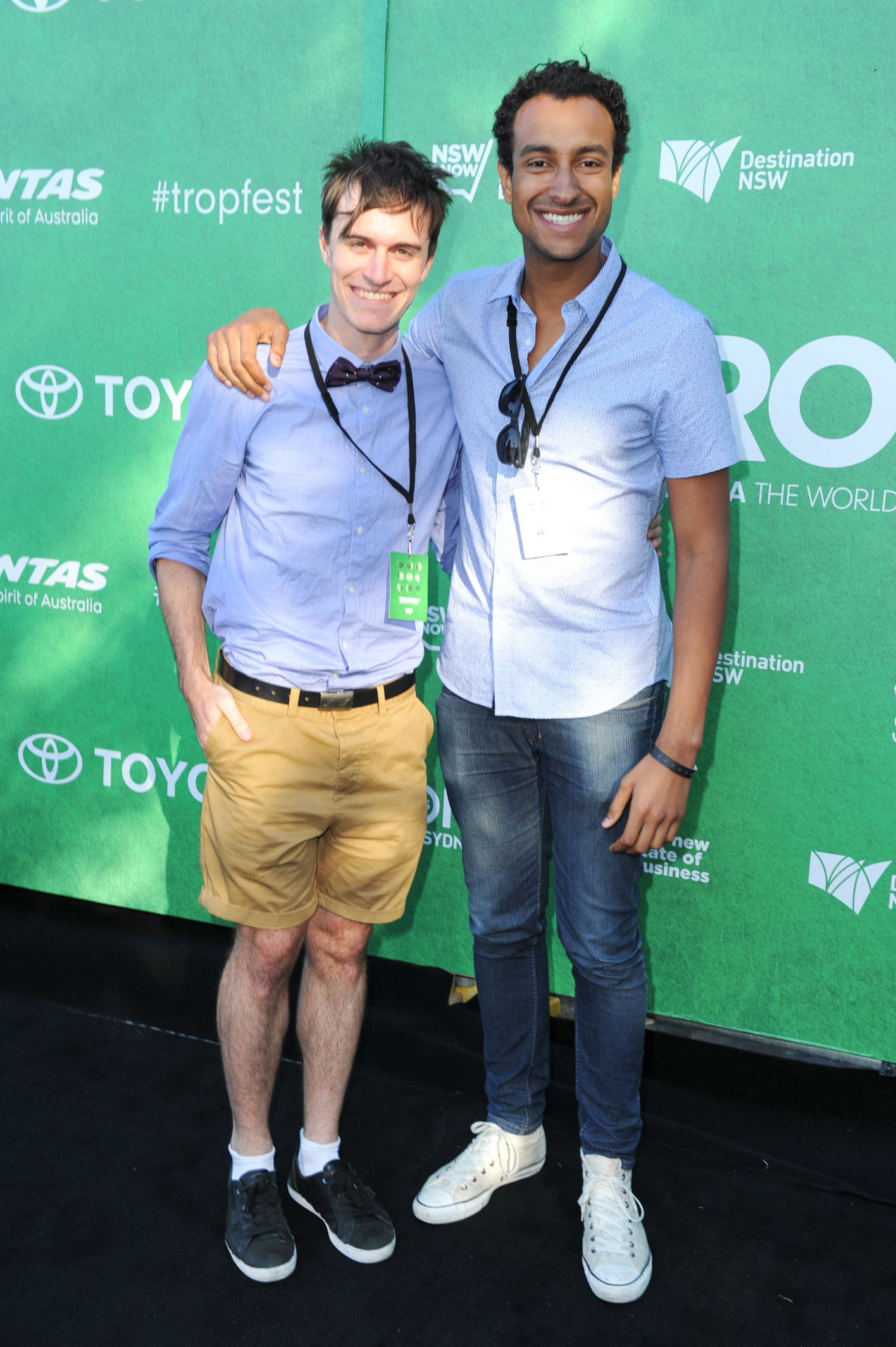
Alex Dyson (left) and Matt Okine at Tropfest 2013.

In 2010, Tom Ballard and Alex Dyson, former hosts of Weekend Breakfast, took over as hosts of the weekday program. In December 2013, Ballard resigned and was replaced by Matt Okine in January 2014. The new duo anchored the program until 2016. The duo brought in strong ratings for Triple J and were considered by Radio Today to host "one of, if not the most, successful [Triple J] breakfast show in its history."

Ben Harvey and Liam Stapleton took over as hosts from 2017, at ages 23 and 20 respectively. On R U OK? Day in September 2017, the two made an on-air speech opening up about the abuse they had received stepping into the role after their predecessors, Matt and Alex. Stapleton said he felt "embarrassed" and "ashamed" from hate messages via the text line and on social media:

"We see when people text into our workplace, we see things. We see all the posts, we see all the comments. And I can honestly say I’ve had nights where I’ve cried myself to sleep because of stuff like that."

The duo left Triple J in 2019, and began hosting Nova FM's breakfast program, which became known as Ben & Liam.

In 2020, Coda Conduct members Sally Coleman and Erica Mallett took over Breakfast to become the first double female act in the slot. However, they resigned in November 2020 due to creative differences and having reached the "natural conclusion" of their program. Former fill-in host Bryce Mills took over for the remainder of the year, and was joined by DJ Ebony Boadu from the start of 2021. Boadu resigned at the end of 2022, and was replaced by comedian Concetta Caristo. Mills resigned at the end of 2024, and was replaced by comedian Luka Muller.

In June 2026, the station announced Drive hosts Abby Butler and Tyrone Pynor would take over the Breakfast shift, following Concetta Caristo's departure from Breakfast. Meanwhile, Muller moved to Drive alongside his former Weekend Arvos co-host Jordan Barr.

Presenter line-ups

- Russell Thorpe ("Rusty Nails"): 1977–1990
- Maynard: 1987–1992
- Helen Razer and Mikey Robins: early 1990s
- Mikey Robins, Paul McDermott, and Steve Abbott ("The Sandman")
- Adam Spencer and Wil Anderson: 1999–2004
- Jason Whalley and Lindsay McDougall (Jay and the Doctor): 2005–2006
- Jason Whalley, Lindsay McDougall and Myf Warhurst: 2007
- Tom Ballard and Alex Dyson: 2010–2013
- Alex Dyson and Matt Okine: 2014–2016
- Ben Harvey and Liam Stapleton (Ben and Liam): 2017–2019
- Sally Coleman and Erica Mallett (Coda Conduct): 2020
- Bryce Mills and Ebony Boadu: 2021–2022
- Bryce Mills and Concetta Caristo: 2023–2024
- Concetta Caristo and Luka Muller: 2024–2026
- Abby Butler and Tyrone Pynor: 2026–present.

=== The Graveyard Shift ===
Launched in 2005, The Graveyard Shift was a late-night talk show that used to be broadcast on Saturday overnights from 1:00 am to dawn on Sunday morning. It was hosted by Dave Callan for the first six years, with Paul Verhoeven taking over in 2011

=== Culture ===
- The Hook Up: A late-night talk show launched in 2016 with discussions and interviews about sex and relationships.
- The Slop: Launched in 2026, The Slop is a podcast dedicated to internet culture, hosted by newsreader Jack James and culture critics Lena Tuck and Michael Sun. Episodes are available on the Triple J Talks YouTube channel.
- Sunday Night Safran: From 2005, John Safran and Bob Maguire co-hosted Sunday Night Safran, a late-night talk show interviewing international guests, generally discussing serious topics like religion and politics.

=== Music analysis ===
- The J Files: A music history program that began on Triple J in 1996 in a three-hour block. Each show was topical; it might feature an artist, a particular year in the past, or songs with a certain theme (e.g. cats and dogs, New Zealand bands, banned songs). From 2003, The J Files became a one-hour Saturday afternoon show, hosted by various Triple J presenters, specifically focused on one particular artist. Its final episode was aired in November 2007. It was revived in 2014 on sister station Double J.
- Perfect Sundays: Interviews with musicians with a playlist of songs they consider to be perfect.

== Comedy ==
- The Race Race: Beginning on 27 October 2008, Chris Taylor and Craig Reucassel co-hosted a comedy program centred on the 2008 United States presidential election entitled The Race Race. The programme aired at 5:00 pm weekdays until the wrap-up episode, which aired on 5 November 2008, after the elections had concluded.
- Restoring the Balance: Broadcast sporadically on Sunday afternoons during 2004. The primary concept behind the show was a satire of the contrasting political views between the conservative Australian Howard government, and the left-wing government-funded Triple J radio station. The show suggested that the station was forced to broadcast a segment of right-wing political views in order to "restore the balance."
- This Sporting Life (TSL): Running from 1986 to 2008, TSL was a parody of sporting panel programs, created and hosted by actor-writer-comedians John Doyle and Greig Pickhaver (under the pseudonyms Roy Slaven & HG Nelson). As well as sport, the duo cast a wide comedic net that encompassed the worlds of entertainment, politics and celebrity. TSL was remarkable as one of the few successful comedy programs that was substantially improvised. The longest-running show in Triple J's programming history, TSL commanded a large and dedicated nationwide audience. Special editions of TSL were broadcast to coincide with the NRL and AFL grand finals (The Festival of the Boot) as well as for all three of rugby league's State of Origin series matches. (see Roy and HG's State of Origin commentary). In 2009, after 22 years at the ABC, the duo left to work for the commercial rock station Triple M.
- Today Today: The drive time show in 2004 and 2005, hosted by Chaser members Chris Taylor and Craig Reucassel. The show's name was derived from Today Tonight, a controversial Australian TV current affairs show screened on the Seven Network. Their humour was in a similar vein to CNNNN and The Chaser, being more politically driven. One of their more popular skits was "Coma FM", a parody of commercial radio stations.

=== Radio plays ===
Triple J has had several comedic radio plays:

- Doctor Poo: long-running comedy within Doug Mulray's morning show
- Coma FM: satirical radio station performed by Today Today hosts Chris Taylor and Craig Reucassel.
- Space Goat: a parody radio sci-fi performed by the breakfast show's Jay and the Doctor which borrowed many features of early radio science fictions such as a long intro for very little story which leaves many questions open, which the narrator spends some time pointing out at the end.
- Battalion 666: a comedic radio drama which takes place on a fictional Royal Navy ship, HMS Beezlebub. It came about when, in 2004, the Royal Navy officially recognised LaVeyan Satanism as an official religion in which its personnel can partake. The show features Jay and the Doctor, John Safran, and various sound clips of famous people taken from recorded interviews such as Tom Cruise and Russell Crowe.

== Compilation albums ==
Triple J used to issue compilation albums on CD for several of its specialty music programs, including The Racket, House Party (until 2017), Hip Hop Show (from 2005) and Home and Hosed (from 2003 to 2006), as well as for its Like a Version (from 2005 to 2021) and Live at the Wireless (until 2010) formats.
