= List of Triple J presenters =

This is a list of radio presenters on Australian national youth broadcaster Triple J. Across the station's five mainstay programs— Breakfast, Mornings, Lunch, Drive and Hack— there are at least eight presenters on the air every weekday. Different personalities host the weekend and summer holiday equivalents of each show. Most of the weekday presenters on Triple J have a background in comedy. For a list of current and discontinued programs, see List of Triple J programs.

== Current presenters ==
List of current presenters, with years and past roles shown
Name	Current role	Past roles	Ref.
Abby Butler	Breakfast (2026–present)	Out to Party (2023), Drive (2024–2026)	
Tyrone Pynor	Breakfast (2026–present)	Weekend Lunch, Soul Ctrl (2022–2023), Out to Party (2023), Drive (2024–2026)	
Lucy Smith	Mornings (2020–present)		
Dave Woodhead	Lunch (2020–present)		
Jordan Barr	Drive (2026–present)	Weekend Arvos, Weekend Breakfast (2024–2026)	
Luka Muller	Drive (2026–present)	Weekend Arvos, Breakfast (2024–2026)	
Sam Lane	Weekends (2026–present)		
Frankie Rowsthorn	Weekends		
Phil Fresh	Weekends		
Nooky	Blak Out (2021–present)		
Jack Bergin	Core (2025–present)		
Tom Forrest	Country Club (2026–present)		
Dave Marchese	Hack (2022–present)		
A.Girl	Hip Hop Show (2025–present)		
Anika Luna	Home and Hosed (2025–present)		
Pip Rasmussen	The Hook Up		
Dee Salmin	The Hook Up (2022–present)		
Shantan Wantan Ichiban	House Party (2023–present)		
Latifa Tee	Doof (2026–present), House Party (2024–present)	The Nudge (2024–2025), Good Nights (2022–2023)	
Kailyn Crabbe	Mix Up		
Tiffi	Prism (2025–present)		
Dr. Karl	Science with Dr. Karl (1981–present)		
Tanya Bunter	Soul Ctrl (2023–present)		

== Past presenters ==
=== 1994 onwards ===
List of past presenters, with departing years and past roles shown
Final year	Name	Past role(s)	Ref.
2026	Concetta Caristo	Breakfast (2023–2026)	
2025	Ash McGregor	Home and Hosed (2023–2025)	
2024	Josh Merriel	Short Fast Loud (2015–2024)	
2024	Lochlan Watt	The Racket (2012–2014)	
2024	Bryce Mills	Lunch (2024), Breakfast (2020–2024), Weekend Arvos (2020)	
2024	Stacy Gougoulis	Weekend Breakfast (2016–2024)	
2024	Tim Shiel	Something More	
2023	Michael Hing	Drive (2020–2023)	
2023	Lewis Hobba	Drive (2015–2023), Weekend Afternoons, Weekend Breakfast	
2023	Bridget Hustwaite	Good Nights (2018–2023), Mid-Dawns (2015–2017)	
2023	Jess Perkins	Weekend Arvos (2021–2023), Mid-Dawns (2017–2020), Summer Breakfast (2020–2021)	
2023	Jade Zoe	House Party (2021–2023)	
2023	Richard Kingsmill	Various programmes (1990–2023)	
2022	Ebony Boadu	Breakfast (2020–2022)	
2022	Declan Byrne	Home and Hosed (2018–2022)	
2022	Hau Latukefu	The Hip Hop Show (2008–2022)	
2021	Nkechi Anele	Roots 'n All (2016–2021)	
2021	Karla Ranby	Weekend Lunch (2018–2021)	
2021	Avani Dias	Hack (2020–2021)	
2021	Nat Tencic	The Hook-Up	
2021	Vance Musgrove	Friday Night Shuffle (2011–2021)	
2020	Sally Coleman	Breakfast (January – November 2020),Weekend Arvos (2018–2019)	
2020	Erica Mallett	Breakfast (January – November 2020), Weekend Arvos (2018–2019)	
2020	Veronica Milsom	Drive (2015–2020), Weekend Afternoons, Weekend Breakfast	
2019	Tom Tilley	Hack (2011–2019)	
2019	Linda Marigliano	Mornings (2018–2019), Good Nights (2012–2017), Lunch (2007), Drive (2008)	
2019	Gen Fricker	Lunch (2017–2019), Weekend Afternoons (2016), Mid-Dawns (2015)	
2019	Liam Stapleton	Breakfast with Ben & Liam (2017–2019)	
2019	Ben Harvey	Breakfast with Ben & Liam (2017–2019)	
2018	Kristy Lee Peters (KLP)	House Party (2015–2018)	
2017	Dylan Alcott	Weekend Arvos (2017)	
2017	Gemma Pike	Weekend Lunch (2015–present), Mid-Dawn (2011–2014)	
2017	Dom Alessio	Home and Hosed (2009–2017)	
2016	Alex Dyson	Breakfast (2010–2016), Weekend Breakfast (2008–2009), Mid-Dawns (2007–2008)	
2016	Matt Okine	Breakfast (2014–2016)	
2016	Lewis McKirdy	Lunch	
2016	Kyran Wheatley	Weekend Afternoons (2016), Weekend Breakfast (2014–2015)	
2016	Sarah Howells	Roots 'N' All, Weekend Lunch	
2015	Nina Las Vegas	House Party	
2015	Bob Maguire	Sunday Night Safran (2005–2015)	
2015	John Safran	Sunday Night Safran (2005–2015)	
2014	Fenella Kernebone	Sound Lab (2003–2014), Creatures/Artery (2000–2003), Saturday Afternoons (2004–2005)	
2014	Lindsay McDougall	Drive (2010–2014), Breakfast (2005–2009), Weekend Afternoons (2004), Drive (September – October 2004)	
2013	Tom Ballard	Breakfast (2010–2013), Weekend Breakfast (2008–2009), Mid-Dawn (2007–2008)	
2012	Paul Verhoeven	Weekend Breakfast (2010), Mid-Dawn, Breakfast, Weekend Afternoons	
2011	The Cloud Girls	Weekday Evenings (2010), Mid-Dawn (2007–2011)	
2011	Rosie Beaton	Net50 (1999–2000), Super Request (2001–2011)	
2011	Andrew Haug	3 Hours of Power, Full Metal Racket (2001–2011)	
2011	Vijay Khurana	Lunch (2008–2011), Weekend Lunch (2007), Mid Dawns (2005–2007)	
2010	Steph Hughes	Home and Hosed (2009–2010)	
2010	Gaby Brown	Saturday Arvos (2006–2010), Weekend Breakfast (2001–2002), Net50 (2003–2005), Weekend Lunch (2000), The Chat Room (2003–2004)	
2009	Marieke Hardy	Breakfast (2008–2009)	
2009	Robbie Buck	Breakfast (2008–2009), Drive / Top Shelf Radio (2006–2007), Weekend Lunch (1998–1999), Lunch (2000), Weekend Lunch (2001–2002), Home and Hosed (2003–2005)	
2009	Scott Dooley	Drive (2008–2009), Weekend Breakfast (2006–2007)	
2007	Myf Warhurst	Net50 (2001–2002), Lunch (2003–2006), Breakfast (2007)	
2007	Jason Whalley	Weekend Afternoons (2004), Drive (September – October 2004), Breakfast (2005–2007)	
2007	Mel Bampton	Drive (2003), Mel in the Morning (2004–2007)	
2006	Steve Cannane	Morning Show (2003), Hack (2004–2006)	
2006	Costa Zouliou	Three Hours of Power (1998–2000), Drive (2000), Weekend Lunch (2002–2006)	
2006	Sharif Galal	Mix Up (1995–2005), Groove Train (1995–2006)	
2006	Ash Grunwald	Roots 'N' All (2005–2006)	
2005	Jordie Kilby	Roots 'N' All (2003–2005)	
2005	Chris Taylor	Today Today (2004–2005)	
2005	Craig Reucassel	Today Today (2004–2005)	
2004	Wil Anderson	Breakfast (2001–2004)	
2004	Adam Spencer	Drive (1998), Breakfast (1999–2004)	
2004	Stu Harvey	Short Fast Loud (2004)	
2003	Nicole Fossati	Drive (2002), The Club (2003)	
2003	Charlie Pickering	Drive (2002–2003)	
2003	Jim Trail	Weekend Breakfast (1998–2000), Sports newsreading (2000–2003)	
2002	Francis Leach	Hours of Power (1990–1994), Creatures (1999), The Morning Show (2000–2002)	
2001	Justin Wilcomes	Net50 (1998–2001)	
2001	Jaslyn Hall	World Music Show (2001)	
2000	Merrick Watts	Drive with Merrick and Rosso (1999–2000)	
2000	Tim Ross	Drive with Merrick and Rosso (1999–2000)	
1999	Sarah MacDonald	The Morning Show (1998–1999)	
1999	Michael Tunn	Request Fest (1997), Lunch (1998–1999)	
1998	Nicole Foote	The Hip Hop Show (1998–2010), Mix Up (1998–2010)	
1998	Jen Apostolou	Net50 (−1998)	
1998	Jane Gazzo	Weekends (1996–1997), Super Request (1998)	
1998	Jen Oldershaw	Afternoons (1991–1993), Morning Show (1996–1997), Breakfast (1998)	
1998	Helen Razer	3 Hours of Power (1990–1991), Breakfast (1992–1996), Drive (1997–1998)	
1998	Mikey Robins	Breakfast (1991–1998)	
1998	The Sandman a.k.a. Steve Abbott	Breakfast (1998)	
1997	Judith Lucy	Drive (1997)	
1997	Paul McDermott	Breakfast (1997)	
1996	Catriona Rowntree	Request Fest (1994), Groove Train (1996)	
1996	Angela Catterns	The Morning Show (1990–1996)	
1995	Ian Rogerson	Drive (1990–1995)	
1995	Debbie Spillane	Drive (1990–1995)	
1994	Paul Murray	Request Fest (1994)	
1991	Deb Nesbitt	Friday Drive (1992–1995), Morning Program (1994), Darwin local presenter (1992–1993)	

=== 1975–1994 ===
- Graeme Bartlett (Shipbuilding For Pleasure, mid to late 1980s)
- Annette Shun Wah
- Holger Brockmann
- Gayle Austin
- Glenn A. Baker
- Tony Barrell
- Tony Biggs (Tony Biggs Show, 1980s)
- Mac Cocker (father of Jarvis Cocker)
- Jonathan Coleman
- Mark Colvin
- Maynard (Mornings, early 1990s)
- Lance Curtis (The Jay Team, comedian)
- Vic Davies (Club Veg, 1980s)
- Arnold Frolows (Ambience, 1980s)
- Bob Hudson
- Alan Knight
- Sandy McCutcheon
- Lex Marinos
- Stuart Matchett
- Mark Dodshon
- Doug Mulray
- Ted Robinson
- Ian Rogerson
- Lawrie Zion
- Cassi Plate

Malcolm Lees(Club Veg)

== See also ==
- List of Triple J programs
