= Whitebridge High School =

Location
- 1 Lonus Avenue; Whitebridge, New South Wales, 2290; Australia; 32°58′21″S 151°42′47″E

Information
- Other name: WHS
- Type: Government-funded co-educational comprehensive secondary day school
- Motto: Latin: Viam Quaere Vitae (Seek the way of life)
- Established: 1963
- Educational authority: Department of Education (New South Wales)
- School number: 8390
- Principal: Nadene Harvey
- Faculty: 10
- Years: 7–12
- Language: English
- Hours in school day: 6
- Houses: Boomali, Jindabyne, Mulgabirra, Tingirra
- Colours: Green, White, Grey
- Newspaper: What's On at Whitebridge (WOW)
- Feeder schools: Charlestown Public School; Charlestown East Public School; Charlestown South Public School; Dudley Public School; Kahibah Public School; Redhead Public School
- Website: whitebridg-h.schools.nsw.gov.au

Whitebridge High School (abbreviated as WHS) is a government-funded co-educational comprehensive secondary day school located in the suburb of Whitebridge, New South Wales. It was established in 1963. Nadene Harvey is the principal of Whitebridge High School.

In 2025, the school had 908 students, with 9–11% of those students identifying as Aboriginal or Torres Strait Islander, and 4–6% having a language background other than English.

== Background ==
Whitebridge High School was established in 1963. The school's motto is Viam Quaere Vitae (seek the way of life), and the school uniform uses a combination of green, grey, and white.

The six feeder schools for Whitebridge High – as well as the high school itself – are collectively known as the "Wiyellai Koa Community of Schools". This name, adopted in 2023, replaced the name "Whitebridge Community of Schools", which had been used since October 2012. The feeder schools, ordered alphabetically, are:

- Charlestown Public School
- Charlestown East Public School
- Charlestown South Public School
- Dudley Public School
- Kahibah Public School
- Redhead Public School

The four houses at Whitebridge High School are Boomali, Jindabyne, Mulgabirra, and Tingirra.

The principal of Whitebridge High School is Nadene Harvey. The school has three deputy principals: Rodney Carter, Amanda Lawler, and Melita Morrow.

Whitebridge High School requires students to choose a Cert II or Cert III VET Course to study. This course is completed across years ten and eleven; the student sits the HSC (if applicable) for that course one year early.

== History ==
=== Academics ===
As of 2025, students at Whitebridge High School had received a cumulative total of 472 Band 6/E4 results and four state ranks.

=== 1990s ===
Luke Burt, a Whitebridge High School student, played for the Australian Schoolboys rugby league team in 1998.

=== 2000s ===
Whitebridge High School's class of 2003 received the school's first state rank: 6th, in Industrial Technology.

In 2007, the outdoor amphitheatre was renovated by a group of ex-students. The project started in February and was finished by the last quarter of the year – most of the work was completed during the Christmas school holidays.

A state rank of 7th in the English Extension 2 course was received by a student in 2008.

=== 2010s ===
A student received a state rank of 19th in the Ancient History course in 2010.

Whitebridge High School had 1026 students in 2014. Four percent were Aboriginal or Torres Strait Islander, and five percent had a language background other than English. The school's overall attendance rate was 90.7%.

In 2015, there were 1000 students at Whitebridge High, with attendance rates at an average of 88.2%.

There were 967 students enrolled in Whitebridge High School in 2016, of which four percent were Aboriginal or Torres Strait Islander, and five percent had a language background other than English. Whitebridge High School's student attendance rate in 2016 was 92.3%.

At the 2016 Rio Paralympics, Whitebridge High student Erin Cleaver competed in the T38 long jump and the Women's 4x100m Relay (T35–38), placing second and fifth respectively.

Whitebridge High School had 933 students enrolled during 2017. Four percent of students were Indigenous Australians, and five percent had a non-English language background. The average student attendance rate was 89.2%. Principal Ian Wilson left Whitebridge High School at the end of Term 2, with Margaret Rennie filling the position for the remainder of the year.

There were 905 students at Whitebridge High School in 2018. The whole school average attendance rate was 86.6%.

2018 was Nadene Harvey's first year as principal at Whitebridge High; she previously worked at Merewether High.

908 students were enrolled at Whitebridge High School; the average attendance rate was 87.7%.

=== 2020s ===
In 2020, there were 965 students at Whitebridge High School. The whole school average attendance was 87.4%, but more than 390 students had at least 90% attendance. A student received a state rank of 10th in the Ancient History course.

Whitebridge High School had 923 students in 2021, of which eight percent were Aboriginal or Torres Strait Islander, and four percent had a language background other than English. Students attended an average of 85.8% of the time.

There were 899 students at Whitebridge High School in 2022. Of those, eight percent were Indigenous Australians, and four percent had a language background other than English. The average attendance rate was 81.6%.

Whitebridge High School had 915 students in 2023. The percentage of both Indigenous Australian students and students with a language background other than English remained the same, at eight percent and four percent respectively. The overall school attendance rate was 84.6%.

Three students from Whitebridge High competed at the 2023 International Children's Games in South Korea.

In 2024, 884 students were enrolled at Whitebridge High School, with six percent identifying as Aboriginal or Torres Strait Islander, and four percent having a language background other than English. Whitebridge High School's average attendance rate in 2024 was 85%.

In 2025, Whitebridge High School had 908 students. Indigenous Australians made up between 9–11% of the student population, while students with a language background other than English accounted for 4–6%. The average rate of attendance was 85.2%.

At a school assembly in June, Trophy Wyfe were announced as the 2026 Triple J Unearthed High winners by Concetta Caristo and Luka Muller. The band formed at Whitebridge High in 2023; at the time of their win, Rex Wardle and Tallis Kessell were in year 12, and Neve Scully had already graduated.

== Facilities ==
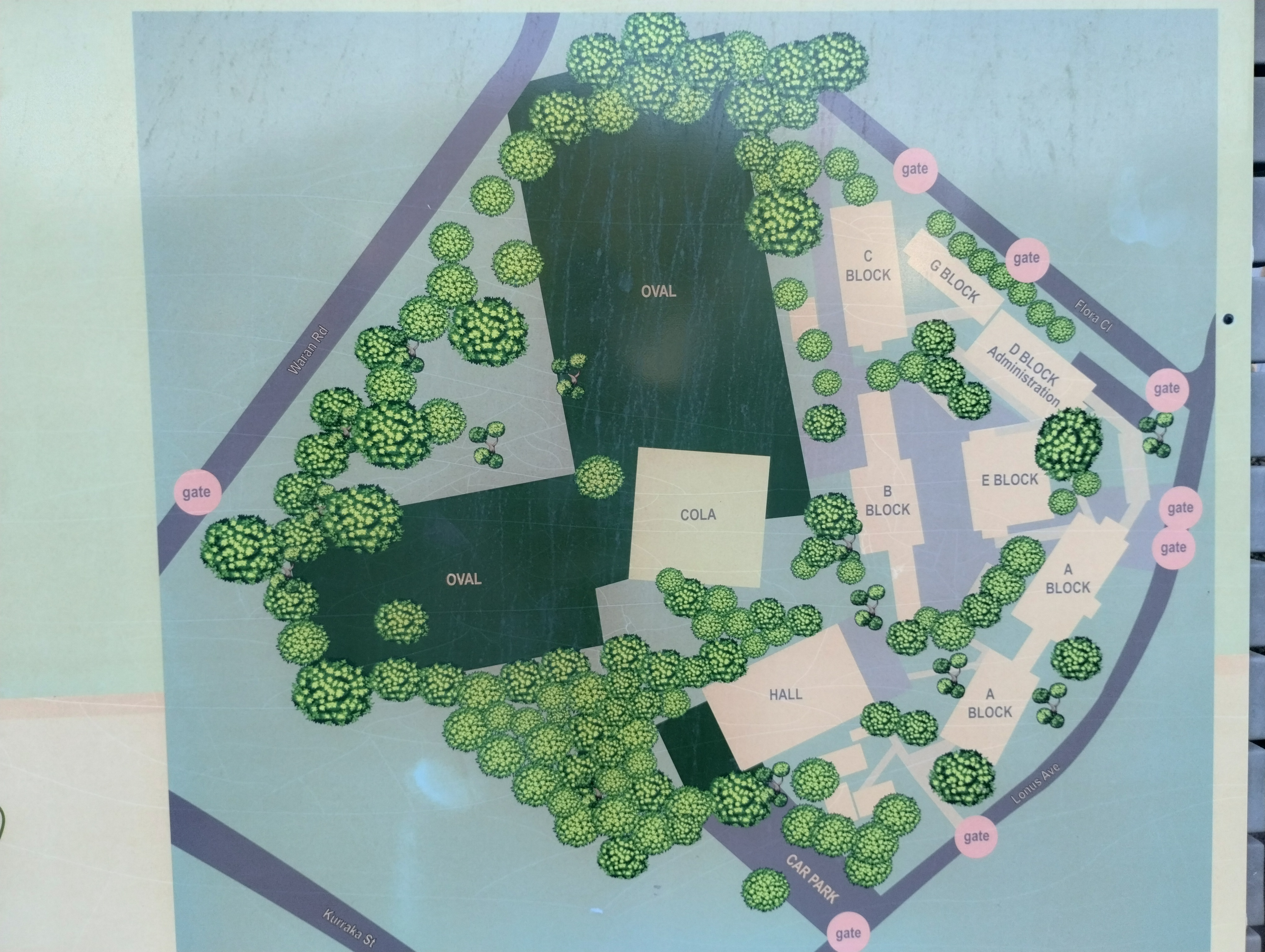
Map of Whitebridge High

There are a variety of different facilities at Whitebridge High School. Blocks are named alphabetically: A Block, B Block, C Block, D Block, E Block, and G Block.

In addition to regular classrooms, Whitebridge High School has computer labs, science labs, art and music rooms, a Covered Outdoor Learning Area (COLA), sporting fields, a library, an outdoor amphitheatre, kitchens, a hall, and an on-site uniform shop.

== Notable alumni ==
Name	Ref
Tim Maddison	
Luke Burt	
Michelle Andrews	
Jemma Pollard	
Emily van Egmond	
Erin Cleaver	
Trophy Wyfe	

== See also ==
- List of government schools in New South Wales (T–Z)
