= Telenova =

Australian pop music trio

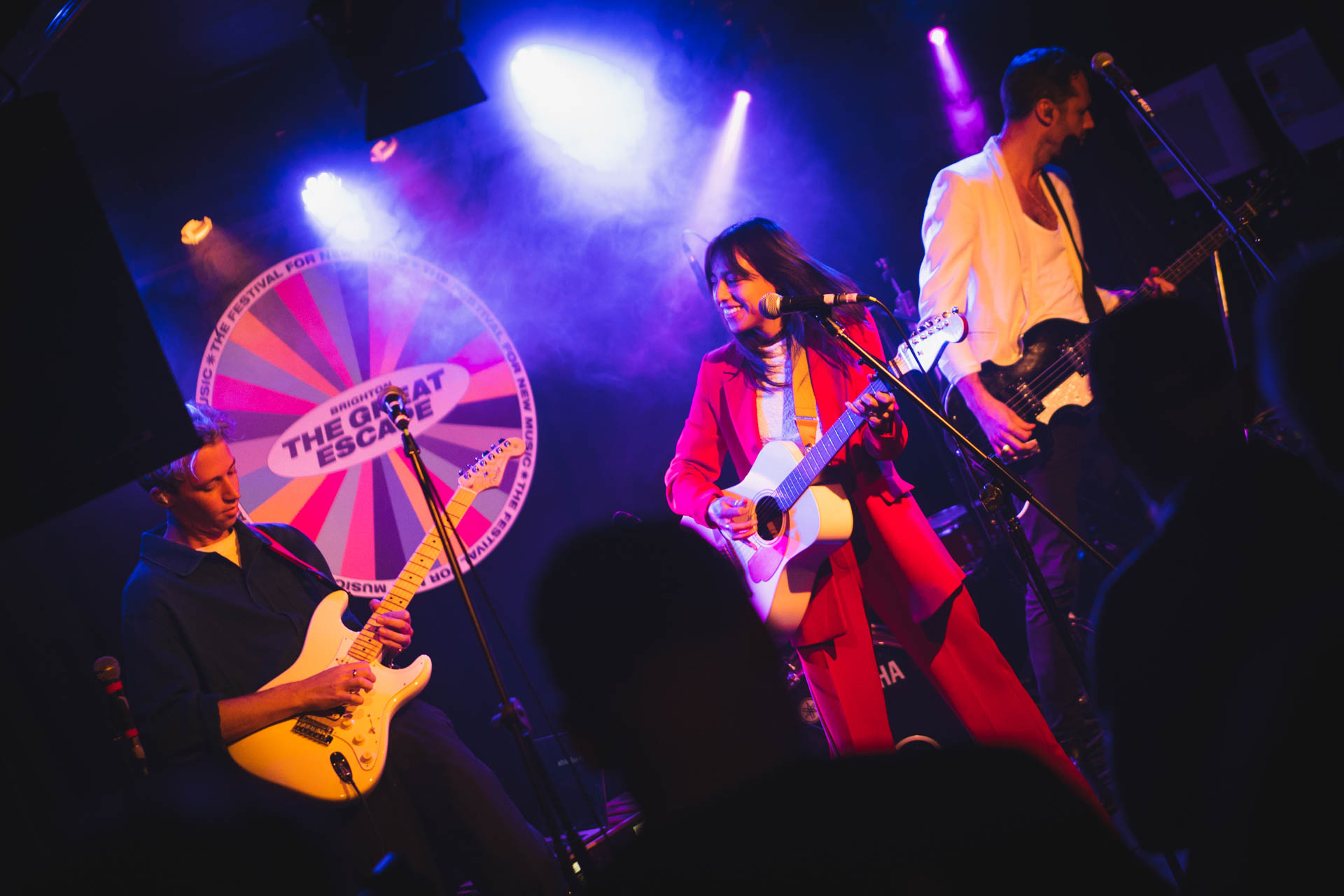
- in the UK in 2022

Background information
- Origin: Melbourne, Victoria, Australia
- Genres: Alternative pop; art pop; blues; electronica; electronic pop; indie folk; indie; pop; R&B; trip hop
- Years active: 2020–present
- Labels: Pointer Recordings, EMI
- Members: Angeline Armstrong; Edward Quinn; Joshua Moriarty
- Website: www.telenovamusic.com.au

Telenova are an Australian alt-indie trio formed in Melbourne, Victoria in 2020. The band consists of lead vocalist, writer and filmmaker Angeline Armstrong, and multi-instrumentalists and producers Edward Quinn and Joshua Moriarty.

Telenova released their debut single "Bones" on 18 March 2021. Their debut extended play, Tranquilize, was released in 2021, whilst a second, Stained Glass Love, followed in 2022.

Their debut studio album Time Is a Flower released on 16 August 2024.

== Career ==
=== 2020–2023: Formation, "Bones" and Tranquilize ===
In early 2020, Telenova were formed by Chris Walla, formerly of Death Cab for Cutie, at an APRA AMCOS SongHubs competition, consisting of Australian filmmaker, writer and musician Angeline Armstrong, multi-instrumentalist and producer Edward Quinn, and multi-instrumentalist and producer Joshua Moriarty.

On 17 March 2021, Telenova's debut single "Bones", was premiered by Declan Byrne on Triple J's Australian music program Home & Hosed. "Bones" was released the following day, as the lead single from their debut extended play. Alongside the release, they announced they had signed with Pointer Recordings, a subsidiary of Remote Control Records. On 19 March, they announced a tour in support of the single, performing two sold out shows at the Colour Club, their debut Sydney show on 24 March at the Lansdowne Hotel, and at the Northcote Social Club on April 8. On 12 April, they were announced as that week's Triple J Unearthed Feature Artist. On 20 April, Telenova were announced as one of 20 recipients of the Music VR Backers Fund, from which A$2,500 goes towards the artists using live virtual reality technologies during live performances. On 7 May, they released the single "Tranquilize", the second single from their debut extended play. On 18 May, Armstrong featured on "60 Seconds With", a segment on Triple J's Australian music program Home & Hosed, in promotion of the single. On 3 June, they announced their debut extended play, Tranquilize. Tranquilize was released on 2 July. On 5 July, they released the single "Blue Valentine". On 30 July, they were announced as part of the 2021 Queensland Music Festival line-up. In March 2023, the group released the single "Lost in the Rush" and announced a regional Australian tour throughout April, May and June 2023.

=== 2024–2025: Time Is a Flower ===
Telenova's debut studio album Time Is a Flower was released on 16 August 2024. The album debuted at #2 on the ARIA Top 20 Australian Albums and was included at #48 on Rolling Stone Australia's 50 Best Australian Albums of 2024.

=== 2026–present: The Warning ===
Telenova released their second studio album, The Warning, on February 27, 2026. It features 11 tracks. It is considered by the media as marking a shift toward a more darker, raw, urgent sound compared to their earlier "cinematic" style, written during a period of personal upheaval and creative strain.

== Musical style and influences ==
Telenova's musical style has been described variously as alternative pop, art pop, blues, electronica, electronic pop, indie folk, indie, pop, R&B, and trip hop.

== Band members ==
Current members

- Angeline Armstrong – vocals (2020–present)
- Edward Quinn – multi-instrumentalist, producer (2020–present)
- Joshua Moriarty – multi-instrumentalist, producer (2020–present)

== Discography ==
=== Studio albums ===
List of albums, with year released and album name shown
Title	Album details	Peak chart positions
Title	Album details	AUS
Time Is a Flower	Released: 16 August 2024; Label: EMI Music Australia (6513624); Formats: LP, digital download, streaming	23
The Warning	Released: 27 February 2026; Label: EMI Music Australia; Formats: LP, digital download, streaming	28

=== Extended plays ===
List of EPs, with year released and album name shown
Title	EP details
Tranquilize	Released: 2 July 2021; Label: Pointer (PR005LP); Formats: LP, digital download, streaming
Stained Glass Love	Released: 19 August 2022; Label: Pointer (PR012LP); Formats: LP, digital download, streaming
Bitcrush	Released: 22 August 2025; Label: Telenova, EMI; Formats: digital download, streaming

== Awards and nominations ==
=== AIR Awards ===
The Australian Independent Record Awards (known informally as the AIR Awards) is an annual awards night to recognise, promote and celebrate the success of Australia's Independent Music sector.

Year	Nominee / work	Award	Result	Ref.
2022	Telenova	Breakthrough Independent Artist of the Year	Won	
2022	"Tranquilize" (Remix EP)	Best Independent Dance or Electronica Album or EP	Nominated	
2023	Stained Glass Love	Best Independent Country Album or EP	Nominated	
2023	Stained Glass Love	Best Independent Pop Album or EP	Nominated	

=== Australian Cinematographers Society Awards ===
On 15 November 2020, Daniel Bolt received the Best Music Video award at the Australian Cinematographers Society Awards for directing the music video to Telenova's song "Tranquilize".

=== Music Victoria Awards ===
The Music Victoria Awards are an annual awards night celebrating Victorian music. They commenced in 2006.

Year	Nominee / work	Award	Result	Ref.
2022	Telenova	Best Pop Work	Nominated	
2022	Telenova	Best Group	Nominated	
2023	Telenova	Best Pop Work	Nominated	
