= Ash McGregor (presenter) =

Australian radio personality

- Born: Brisbane, Australia
- Occupations: Radio host; radio producer; podcast host
- Years active: 2020–present
- Employer: triple j (former)
- Notable work: Home and Hosed; Listen Up with Ash McGregor

Ashley McGregor is an Australian radio and podcast personality known for her work in the Australian music scene. From 2023 to 2025, she was the host of local music program Home and Hosed on national youth broadcaster Triple J. She now hosts the Listen Up with Ash McGregor podcast.

== Career ==
In 2020, Ash McGregor joined Triple J as the executive producer for the Breakfast program, and filled in for Drive and Blak Out in the following years. She took over as the permanent presenter for daily Australian music show Home and Hosed in 2023, after Declan Byrne's departure. She was responsible for expanding the show's time slot from one to two hours. Music writer Jade Kennedy of Tone Deaf wrote she had been "instrumental in connecting audiences with Australian talent." During her time on air, she was influential in the discovery of Royel Otis, BOY SODA and Lithe, spotlighting the next generation of Australian talent. Her final broadcast was 31 July 2025, with Anika Luna taking over hosting duties.

After leaving radio, McGregor became a fellow with Creative Australia for her contributions in the music scene, and began hosting her own music podcast, Listen Up with Ash McGregor.

== Personal life ==
McGregor is a Wadawurrung woman born and raised in Brisbane. Her mother is an Aboriginal artist, and her father a music lover —growing up she was surrounded by music and learnt the drums.
