= Matchett =

Matchett is a surname. Notable people with the surname include:

- Kari Matchett (born 1970), Canadian actress in television and film
- Steve Matchett (born 1962), commentator for American cable TV station SPEED Channel
- Stuart Matchett, Australian radio announcer and program director
- Thomas Matchett (1826–1900), Ontario businessman and political figure
- Charles H. Matchett (1843-1919), American socialist politician
- Matchett Herring Coe (1907–1999), American sculptor active in Texas
