= Trophy Wyfe =

- Trophy Wyfe at Newcastle University's Bar on the Hill

Background information
- Origin: Newcastle, New South Wales, Australia
- Genres: Indie rock, Post-punk
- Years active: 2023–present
- Award: 2026 Triple J Unearthed High Winner
- Members: Rex Wardle, Tallis Kessell, Neve Scully

Trophy Wyfe are an Australian indie rock and post-punk band. They formed at Whitebridge High School, in Newcastle, New South Wales, where the members attended school together. The band consists of vocalist and guitarist Rex Wardle, drummer Tallis Kessell, and bassist Neve Scully.

Trophy Wyfe won Triple J's Unearthed High competition in 2026.

== History ==
The band started in 2023 at Whitebridge High School; Rex and Tallis were 15, while Neve was 16. Rex is the band's vocalist and guitarist, Tallis is Trophy Wyfe's drummer, and Neve is the band's bassist.

=== 2024 ===
Trophy Wyfe released their debut single, "Monday", on 25 July.

"Dead", Trophy Wyfe's second single, was released in October.

=== 2025 ===
In February, Trophy Wyfe published their next single, "Come Around".

At the Newcastle Museum's Future Street Party on 12 April, Trophy Wyfe performed alongside a number of other young Novocastrian bands.

The band released their debut EP, No One’s Listening, in June, with seven tracks including their previous singles "Monday" and "Come Around". On 21 June, they launched the EP with a performance at Hiss & Crackle in Wallsend.

Trophy Wyfe toured with Press Club for three shows on their 2025 "'To All The Ones That I Love' Album Tour": 31 July in Woollongong, 1 August in Newcastle, and 2 August in Sydney.

Trophy Wyfe supported STOMP at their "The Chance" single release show, at The Den, in Newcastle, on 29 August.

On 5 October, Trophy Wyfe performed at the Newcastle music festival West Bloc Fest.

The band performed at the Down the Park music festival in Newcastle on 20 November.

=== 2026 ===
In February, Trophy Wyfe released a single, titled "Bullseye". On 20 February, Trophy Wyfe performed alongside Finding Better Health at the Hamilton Station Hotel. The band performed at the Royal Oak Hotel in Tighes Hill on 27 February to launch "Bullseye".

On April 18, Trophy Wyfe performed in Belford with STOMP.

Trophy Wyfe's single "Spiders" – uploaded to Unearthed on 22 April – was named as one of five finalists in Triple J's Unearthed High competition; the last time a Newcastle artist had done so was in 2022. The competition featured over one thousand artists in 2026. On 11 June, Concetta Caristo and Luka Muller visited Whitebridge High to announce Trophy Wyfe as the winners of Triple J's 2026 Unearthed High competition. As a prize, the band received an all expenses paid trip to a mentor session with an artist of their choice: Genesis Owusu, G Flip, Kinder or The Rions. Trophy Wyfe chose Genesis Owusu. Rex Wardle described the song as "a call-out to your mates when they're saying those [misogynistic] things or making those really harmful decisions, to just call them out and stand up for what you know is the right thing."

On 10 May, Trophy Wyfe performed at Hamilton Station Hotel.

The band played at Newcastle University's Bar on the Hill on 20 June, supporting Skegss. Trophy Wyfe played on 13 June, at Full On Arvo 2, in Hamilton Station Hotel.

Trophy Wyfe performed at King Street Crawl in Newtown, Sydney, at 3:35 pm on 12 July.

On 19 July, Trophy Wyfe played at Earp Distilling Co, in Carrington, alongside Annie Hamilton, as special guests at a show during the Vacations "Holy Grail" tour.

== Discography ==
=== EPs ===
Title	Release year	Tracklist
No One's Listening	2025	"Come Around" "Timing" "More Than That" "Monday" "Locked Up" "Temporal" "Dead"

=== Singles ===
- "Monday" (2024)
- "Dead" (2024)
- "Come Around" (2025)
- "Bullseye" (2026)
- "Spiders" (2026)

== Awards ==
Trophy Wyfe won the Australia-wide Triple J Unearthed High competition in 2026 for their song "Spiders".
