= Ash McGregor =

Ash McGregor may refer to:

- Ash McGregor (presenter), Australian radio personality
- Ash McGregor (rugby player), New Zealand former rugby union player
