= Clint Stanaway =

Australian journalist and broadcaster (born 1982)

- Born: 17 December 1982 (age 43); Melbourne, Australia
- Education: Deakin University
- Occupations: Television and radio presenter, journalist, reporter
- Years active: 2002–present
- Employer(s): Nine Network; Nova 100
- Children: 1

Clint Stanaway (born 17 December 1982) is an Australian journalist and broadcaster, best known for his work as a sports presenter and radio host.

He has worked extensively with the Nine Network and currently co-hosts the breakfast radio show Jase, Lauren & Clint on Nova 100 in Melbourne.

== Early life and education ==
Stanaway was born in Melbourne, Victoria. He studied at Deakin University, earning a Bachelor of Arts degree. His early experience in the GTV9 News Library helped shape his interest in journalism and broadcasting.

== Career ==
Stanaway began his media career in 2002 at WIN Television in Bendigo, where he worked as a reporter.

In 2005, he joined the Nine Network, initially as a sports journalist. Over the next two decades, he covered major international sporting events including the FIFA World Cups in Brazil (2014), Russia (2018), and Qatar (2022), the London 2012 Olympic Games, Wimbledon, The Ashes, and the Cricket World Cup in India.

In 2007, Clint relocated to London, where he served as Nine Network’s Europe Correspondent, covering both sports and general news across the continent. During this period, he also worked with British Sky Broadcasting.

In 2011, Stanaway was appointed as weekend sport presenter on Nine News Melbourne.

In January 2019, Clint was appointed as sport presenter on Weekend Today.

In April 2023, Stanaway was appointed as co-host of Weekend Today. During his tenure, Clint co-hosted alongside Jayne Azzopardi, Sophie Walsh, and Alison Piotrowski. He remained host until his resignation in November 2025

In 2022, Clint joined KIIS 101.1’s Jase & Lauren breakfast show, bringing his experience and personality to radio audiences. The show quickly became one of Melbourne’s top-rated morning programs. After being axed by KIIS 101.1 in November 2023, the show was relaunched on Nova 100 four months later.

In 2025, Stanaway announced his departure from the Nine Network after nearly 25 years, citing burnout and a desire to focus on his radio career and personal well-being.

In June 2026, Stanaway announced he would become a father with a good friend Eliza Paschke. He welcomed his daughter in November 2026.

== Personal life ==
Stanaway resides in Melbourne and has spoken publicly about the challenges of balancing multiple media roles. He has advocated for mental health awareness and work-life balance in the broadcasting industry.
