= Mad Mel =

- Born: Mel Potts c.1945
- Presenting career
- Station: 2SM
- Time slot: 10 pm – midnight (M – F)
- Country: Australia
- Previous shows: KITN, CFUN (Canada)

Mad Mel (born c.1945 as Mel Potts, later changed to Mel Happy) is a Canadian-born Australian former disc jockey. He was part of the Good Guys team at radio station 2SM in Sydney.

== Career ==
In the early 1960s, Mel and his friend Rob McAdams started a local radio station (KITN) in Victoria, British Columbia. They bought air time from KONP in Port Angeles, Washington and broadcast via a telephone line from a local Victoria store from 4 pm to 8 pm on Monday to Friday, selling advertising to local merchants.

In 1963 Sydney radio station 2SM was relaunched as a Top 40 station featuring Australia's first team of disc jockeys, known as "The Good Guys". Mel was recruited to present the 10 pm to midnight slot. He portrayed a zany character with alter-egos like "Granny Scoopshovel"; the opening soundtrack had him released from a cage to start the program. When The Beatles toured Australia in 1964, Mel asked his listeners to contribute to a Beatles gift of a woollen scarf. Over 11,000 pieces were received from as far as Tasmania and Fiji. Schoolgirls joined the pieces together in the 2SM foyer, the resulting scarf being over 10 metres long. To present the scarf, Mel hid at the Sheraton Hotel and surprised Paul McCartney in the corridor whereupon Mel was invited into The Beatles sanctum. The scarf was too big for The Beatles to take back to England so Mel kept it. It has been valued at up to $10,000. The scarf was put up for auction through Christie's in 2009.

Mel subsequently befriended members of The Beatles and recorded banter with them for broadcast on his program.

In 1965 Mel moved to CFUN in Vancouver, presenting from 6 pm to 9 pm Monday to Friday, and 4 pm to 9 pm on Saturday. Coincidentally, CFUN was also using the Good Guys format at that time, although Mel was known as the "Bad Guy".

In 1969, 2SM program manager Rod Muir relaunched the Good Guys format and brought Mad Mel back to the station. Mel promoted a number of events including the Mad Mel Big Stir, a concert under the Sydney Harbour Bridge featuring Tamam Shud and other bands.

Mad Mel attempted a comeback in the 1980s on 2WS with additional material written by Vic Davies.

It is believed that Mad Mel still lives in Sydney.
