= Alchemy (TV series) =

Australian music television show (1998–2001)

Alchemy was an Australian music television show broadcast by SBS. It was hosted by Robbie Buck, Nicole Fossati and Frank Rodi. Beginning in 1998 as on ofshoot of Rodi's Alchemy radio show. Focussing on dance music it first played on Friday nights, premiering on 31 July 1998 and moving to Monday nights where it finished on 30 April 2001

== See also ==
- List of Australian music television shows
- List of Australian television series
