= Dom Alessio =

Australian radio personality

- Born: 22 June 1983 (age 43); Sydney, New South Wales, Australia
- Occupation: Radio presenter
- Known for: Triple J

Dom Alessio is an Australian radio personality, music journalist and blogger. He is best known as the host of the Australian music show on Triple J radio, Home & Hosed

== Early career ==
Alessio started as a freelance music journalist in 2005, writing for Hotpress Magazine. He co-founded the Australian music blog Who The Bloody Hell Are They? in 2006, which was one of the first Australian music blogs. In 2007, he became the Arts and Assistant Editor for Sydney street press magazine The Brag. He also wrote for publications such as The Sun-Herald, Mess and Noise, Cyclic Defrost, Faster Louder and Groupie Magazine.

In 2008, Alessio started at FBi Radio in Sydney as one of the hosts of "The Bridge", which is the station's show dedicated to Sydney music.

== Triple J ==
In 2009 Alessio began hosting the Australian music show on Triple J, Home & Hosed. He hosted the show on Monday and Wednesday nights, while Steph Hughes hosted the show on Tuesday and Thursday nights. The show has been recognised by the Australian media as influential in discovering new Australian artists. Previous hosts of the show include Robbie Buck, Caroline Tran and Richard Kingsmill, the latter hosting the show when it was called The Australian Music Show.

Following Hughes' departure at the end of 2010, Alessio became the sole host of Home & Hosed. That same year he was listed as one of the Australian music industry's most influential people under 30.

== Other appearances ==
Alessio has appeared as a guest on BBC Radio 6 Music, 702 ABC Sydney, East Village Radio, Kiwi FM, Beats 1, and triple j Unearthed digital radio.
