= Angela Webber =

Australian comedian

- Born: 12 January 1955; Sydney, New South Wales, Australia
- Died: 10 March 2007 (aged 52); Coogee, New South Wales, Australia
- Education: Presbyterian Ladies' College, Sydney; University of Sydney
- Occupations: Author, TV writer, TV producer, radio comedian
- Employer: Australian Broadcasting Corporation
- Spouse: Stuart Matchett
- Children: 2

Angela Webber (12 January 1955 – 10 March 2007) was an Australian author, TV writer, producer and comedian.

== Early life ==
Webber was born in 1955 to Bruce Webber, the head of light entertainment for ABC radio, and Nan, a journalist. She grew up in West Ryde, and was educated at the Presbyterian Ladies' College, Sydney in Croydon (together with schoolmate Johanna Pigott), where she was elected School Captain and was a winner of a prestigious PLC Gold Medallion in 1972. After finishing school, Webber enrolled at the University of Sydney, where she studied architecture and discovered her passion for writing comedy.

== Career ==
In 1981, Webber joined the ABC's youth radio network Triple J, as a member of the comedy group The "J-Team", which also included the late Lance Curtis. The J-Team were featured alongside co-hosts Jonathan Coleman and Ian Rogerson (a.k.a. "Jonno and Dano") in this freewheeling Sunday afternoon satirical comedy program. The group then moved on to a popular stint as the stars of the Triple-J breakfast show, which was anchored by DJ Rusty Nails.

It was here that Webber met her husband-to-be, Stuart Matchett, and became known for her comedic alter-ego, the anarchic punk pensioner "Lillian Pascoe", who had a fondness for heavy metal music and who regularly proclaimed her slogan "Rage 'til ya puke!". She also made numerous guest appearances on radio and TV as Lillian and released a novelty single which parodied the hip hop classic "The Message".

In 1984, at just 29 years of age, Webber was diagnosed with breast cancer. With Matchett beside her, she underwent the many treatments.

After the birth of her daughters, Lily and Sally, she wrote The P-Plate Parent with Richard Glover, in which she spoke of the adventures of being a mother. She also wrote material for TV performers such as Gerry Connolly, Garry McDonald, Dave Allen and Pamela Stephenson.

Webber's most successful and best-known work came later in her life in the form of the children's TV series Mortified. This series was a comedy drama playing on the embarrassment that children often feel towards their parents, and in 2006 won an Australian Film Institute Award for Best Children's Television Drama. Mortified has since been sold to more than 15 countries, including Britain, France, Italy and Argentina.

== See also ==
- List of breast cancer patients according to survival status
- List of Old Girls of PLC Sydney
