= Club Veg =

Australian comedian and radio presenter

- Other names: The Morning After Show
- Genre: Comedy, talk radio
- Country of origin: Australia
- Home station: Triple J, 2SM, Triple M
- Hosted by: Vic Davies, Mal Lees
- Created by: Vic Davies, Mal Lees
- Written by: Vic Davies, Mal Lees
- Original release: 1984 – 2002

Club Veg (initially called The Morning After Show) was an Australian radio show created and presented by comedy duo, Vic Davies and Mal Lees (with writing contributions in the early years from Stephen Quinn). The show began on Triple J (1984–86), then moved to 2SM (1986–1988), and then the duo's first run on Triple M Sydney (1988–1994) saw them hosting nights and then breakfast, before leaving the station for Triple M Perth (1994–95). After a few years apart, the duo returned to Triple M Sydney again in 1998 and remained there until the show's cancellation in 2002.

== History ==
Vic Davies and Mal Lees met at radio station, 2KA, Katoomba in the mid-1970s. After having worked together at 2WS Sydney, where they wrote and produced comedy for Mad Mel, the duo recognized they could write better for themselves than for others. Lees then made contact with an executive at Triple J and introduced him to a new form of radio comedy, subsequently starting development of The Morning After Show in 1984.

The duo hosted theme nights at The Tivoli in George Street, Sydney and because their listeners referred to them as "The Veggies" (due to their mock-vegetative presenting style) the theme nights named were Club Veg. When their Saturday breakfast show was moved to drive time, The Morning After Show title could no longer fit and the show was rebranded as Club Veg.

The duo parodied several people including radio presenter, John Laws, and Jack Jones (who sang the Love Boat theme). After 18 months rival station, 2SM, offered the Club Veg team the drive shift and soon after the breakfast slot, before Triple M Sydney offered them a contract for the nighttime show late in 1987.

With Club Veg, Triple M introduced the first FM nightly countdown, "Rock Poll". It was during this period when Club Veg recorded the highest 7PM–10PM results in Australian radio history and on their second stint at Triple M Sydney (1998–99), Club Veg was the first show to break Laws' long reign over the 9AM-12PM slot.

The show was awarded 1987 New York Radio Comedy Award, and the Australian Radio Award (later known as an ACRA) in 1990 for Best On-Air Team. At the ARIA Music Awards of 1989 their debut album, Members and Guests and Things was nominated for Best Comedy Release. Their second album, We Suck, was nominated in the same category in 2000.

The partnership ended in 2002 after their contract with Triple M Sydney ended.

== Radio Stations ==
- Triple J – 1984 to 1986
- 2SM – 1986 to 1988
- Triple M Sydney – 1988 to 1994
- Triple M Perth – 1994 to 1995
- Triple M Sydney – 1998 to 2002

== Discography ==
=== Studio albums ===
List of albums, with selected chart positions
| Title | Album details | Peak chart positions |
| Title | Album details | AUS |
|---|---|---|
| Members and Guests & Things | Released: July 1988; Format: LP, CD; Label: Virgin (VOZ2016) | 72 |
| We Suck! The Best of Sucked in Calls | Released: May 2000; Format: CD; Label: Sick Day Records (VEG 001) | 53 |

== Awards and nominations ==
=== ARIA Music Awards ===
The ARIA Music Awards is an annual awards ceremony that recognises excellence, innovation, and achievement across all genres of Australian music.

| Year | Nominee / work | Award | Result |
|---|---|---|---|
| 1989 | Members and Guests & Things | Best Comedy Release | Nominated |
| 2000 | We Suck – The Best of Sucked in Calls | Best Comedy Release | Nominated |

== See also ==
- List of Triple J presenters
