= I'm a Celebrity...Get Me Out of Here! (Australian TV series) season 12 =

I'm a Celebrity...Get Me Out of Here!
- Season 12
- Presented by: Julia Morris; Robert Irwin
- No. of days: 20
- No. of contestants: 13
- Winner: Concetta Caristo
- Runners-up: Luke Bateman; Gary Sweet
- Location: Kruger National Park, South Africa
- No. of episodes: 21

Release
- Original network: Network 10
- Original release: 18 January – 22 February 2026

Additional information
- Filming dates: 28 November – 17 December 2025

Season chronology
- ← Previous; Season 11

The twelfth season of I'm a Celebrity...Get Me Out of Here! was commissioned by Network 10 in November 2025 and premiered on 18 January 2026. It was hosted by Julia Morris and Robert Irwin.

This season of the series was pre-recorded, with filming completed between November and December 2025. Three different endings were filmed, with the audience voting to determine the winner in the finale.

This was the last season of the Network 10 iteration of the series. They rested the series after the broadcast of the season. The series was then picked up by the Seven Network, with a new season set to air in 2027 with the hosts changing to Ricki-Lee Coulter and Jim Jefferies.

== Teaser ==
The first teaser trailer, featuring hosts Julia Morris and Robert Irwin in a 1970s disco fever themed promo, was released on 17 November 2025.

== Celebrities ==
On 15 January 2026, the first contestant was revealed, three days prior to the premiere of the first episode, to be former NRL player Luke Bateman. On 18 January, hours prior to the premiere, two more celebrities were announced: Rachel Hunter and Dyson Heppell. In episode 2, two more contestants entered the jungle, Cyrell Paule and Matt Zukowski, and in episode 5, the final celebrity George Calombaris entered the jungle.

Celebrity	Known for	Status	Source
Concetta Caristo	Radio presenter and comedian	Winner on 22 February 2026	
Gary Sweet	Actor	Runners-up on 22 February 2026	
Luke Bateman	Former NRL player	Runners-up on 22 February 2026	
Nath Valvo	Stand-up comedian	Eliminated 9th on 18 February 2026	
Rebekah Elmaloglou	Actress	Eliminated 8th on 18 February 2026	
Cyrell Paule	Married at First Sight contestant	Eliminated 7th on 18 February 2026	
George Calombaris	Chef	Eliminated 6th on 16 February 2026	
Mia Fevola	Internet personality	Eliminated 5th on 15 February 2026	
Dyson Heppell	Former AFL player	Eliminated 4th on 11 February 2026	
Barry Williams	The Brady Bunch star	Eliminated 3rd on 9 February 2026	
Matt Zukowski	Love Island Australia contestant	Eliminated 2nd on 4 February 2026	
Rachel Hunter	Model	Eliminated 1st on 1 February 2026	
Deni Hines	Singer	Withdrew on 27 January 2026	

== Results and elimination ==
Indicates that the celebrity won a game or vote.
Indicates that the celebrity was immune from the elimination challenge depending on certain criteria. (1)
Indicates that the celebrity was named as being in the bottom 2 or 3.
Indicates that the celebrity was eliminated as a result of losing the elimination challenge
Indicates that the celebrity withdrew from the competition

Elimination results per celebrity
Celebrity	Week 1	Week 2		Week 3			Week 4			Grand Finale	Number of Trials
Celebrity	Week 1	Day 8	Day 11	Day 13	Day 15	Day 16	Day 17	Day 18	Day 19	Grand Finale	Number of Trials
Concetta	—N/a	Safe	Immune	Safe	Safe	Safe	Bottom 3	Safe	2nd	Winner (Day 20)	7
Gary	—N/a	Immune	Safe	Safe	Bottom 2	Immune	Immune	Safe* (14)	3rd	Runners-up (Day 20)	5
Luke	—N/a	Safe	Bottom 3	Immune	Safe	Immune	Immune	Safe	1st	Runners-up (Day 20)	6
Rebekah	—N/a	Safe	Immune	Bottom 2	Safe	Safe	Immune	Bottom 2	4th	Eliminated (Day 19)	6
Nath	—N/a	Safe	Safe	Safe	Safe	Immune	Bottom 3	Safe	5th	Eliminated (Day 19)	7
Cyrell	—N/a	Immune	Immune	Safe	Safe	Bottom 2	Immune	6th	Eliminated (Day 18)		5
George	Not in Camp	Immune	Safe	Safe	Safe	Immune	7th	Eliminated (Day 17)			4
Mia	—N/a	Safe	Immune	Safe	Safe	8th	Eliminated (Day 16)				4
Dyson	—N/a	Safe	Bottom 3	Immune	9th	Eliminated (Day 15)					4
Barry	—N/a	Safe	Safe	10th	Eliminated (Day 13)						3
Matt	—N/a	Bottom 2	11th	Eliminated (Day 11)							2
Rachel	—N/a	12th	Eliminated (Day 8)								2
Deni	Withdrew (Day 7)										2
Withdrew	Deni	None									
Elimination challenge (competitors)	N/A	Matt Rachel	Dyson Luke Matt	Barry Rebekah	Dyson Gary	Cyrell Mia	Concetta George Nath	Cyrell Rebekah	N/A		
Eliminated	N/A	Rachel; Lost elimination challenge	Matt; Lost elimination challenge	Barry; Lost elimination challenge	Dyson; Lost elimination challenge	Mia; Lost elimination challenge	George; Lost elimination challenge	Cyrell; Lost elimination challenge	Nath & Rebekah; Lost "Fight to the Finale"	Gary; Fewest votes to win	
Eliminated	N/A	Rachel; Lost elimination challenge	Matt; Lost elimination challenge	Barry; Lost elimination challenge	Dyson; Lost elimination challenge	Mia; Lost elimination challenge	George; Lost elimination challenge	Cyrell; Lost elimination challenge	Nath & Rebekah; Lost "Fight to the Finale"	Luke; Fewest votes to win	
Eliminated	N/A	Rachel; Lost elimination challenge	Matt; Lost elimination challenge	Barry; Lost elimination challenge	Dyson; Lost elimination challenge	Mia; Lost elimination challenge	George; Lost elimination challenge	Cyrell; Lost elimination challenge	Nath & Rebekah; Lost "Fight to the Finale"	Concetta; Most votes to win	

- ^1 Elimination Immunity was determined per the following:
  - Day 8: As Cyrell and Gary were the team captains, they were immune from being selected for the elimination challenge by the other team. The Gold team was also told that they could not select George as he had only been in the jungle for three days.
  - Day 11: All the female contestants were immune for this elimination due to seven male and four female contestants remaining.
  - Day 13: Dyson and Luke were immune and given the opportunity to select the celebrities going into elimination due to surviving the previous elimination challenge.
  - Day 15: Noone was immune, the two celebrities chosen for elimination were chosen by "The Letters of Doom". Each celebrity picked up a letter, and the two celebrities with a red X in their letter were sent to the elimination.
  - Day 16: All the male contestants were immune for this elimination as they had to choose two women to go to elimination.
    - While not immune, the male contestants chose to avoid nominating Rebekah as she already competed in an elimination.
  - Day 17: As Cyrell, Gary, Luke and Rebekah had already faced an elimination challenge, they were immune for this eliminated,
    - Due to this Concetta, George and Nath were automatically selected being the only celebrities to not have done an elimination challenge.
  - Day 18: The celebrities had to vote the two celebrities they most wanted to see in the finale/win. Cyrell, Rebekah and Gary had a three-way tie for the fewest votes and as a result, Concetta, Luke and Nath had to choose two of the three celebrities for the elimination.

== Tucker trials ==
The contestants take part in daily trials to earn food. These trials aim to test both physical and mental abilities. Success is usually determined by the number of stars collected during the trial, with each star representing a meal earned by the winning contestant for their camp mates.

The celebrity's name was drawn from "Royce the tiny Rhino"
The contestants decided who did which trial
The trial was compulsory and the celebrities did not decide who took part, nor was a name drawn from "Royce the tiny Rhino".
The contestants were chosen by the evicted celebrities
The voting for the trial was of dual origin

Trial number	Airdate	Name of trial	Celebrity participation	Number of stars/Winner(s)	Notes	Source
1	18 January	Jungle Telecommunications Hub	Barry, Mia & Rachel	3/3 stars	2	
2	18 January		Deni, Luke, Nath & Rebekah	4/4 stars	2	
3	18 January		Gary (Tough), Dyson (Tougher) & Concetta (Toughest)	4/4 stars	2	
4	19 January	Dirty Laundry	Concetta & Nath	6/10 stars		
5	20 January	Beam Me Up	Matt	5/9 stars	3	
6	21 January	Sick N' Mix	Deni, Dyson, Matt & Mia	12/12 stars	4	
7	25 January	Balancing Act	Gary & George	7/13 stars	5	
8	26 January	A Spanner in the works!	Barry, Cyrell, Rachel & Rebekah	9/13 stars		
9	27 January	Dyanmite Fight, Kaboom	Dyson (Gold); Luke (green)	Luke	6 7	
10	28 January	The Great Jungle Eating Contest	Rebekah & Gary (Gold); George & Nath (Green)	Rebekah & Gary		
11	1 February	The Viper Room	Concetta (Gold); Cyrell (Green)	Concetta		
12	2 February	Networking	Luke & Mia	11/11 stars	6	
13	3 February	Wheel of Misfortune	Barry, Concetta, Dyson & George	11/11 stars	8	
14	4 February	A Really, Really Fun Day Out At The Playground	Nath, Luke, Mia & Rebekah	Win	9	
15	8 February	Cockie Blocking	Gary	10/10 stars		
16	9 February	Snot Pleasant	Cyrell & Nath	7/9 stars		
17	10 February	Scarefoot Bowls	Concetta, Cyrell & Luke	9/9 stars		
18	11 February	A Nightmare on Bug Street	George & Rebekah	6/8 stars	10	
19	16 February	Water Horrible Trial	Concetta & Nath	7/7 stars		
20	17 February	Help From Our Friends	Everyone	3.5/6 stars	11; 12	

=== Notes ===
- ^2 The name of the trial was not officially revealed.
- ^3 The maximum number of stars in this trial was nine instead of twelve, due to three celebrities being marooned in the Elephants' graveyard.
- ^4 The celebrities won a full nine stars for the nine celebrities in the main camp, however this was upgraded to twelve stars upon saving Cyrell, Gary and Rebekah from the Elephants' Graveyard
- ^5 George, as an intruder had to complete the Balancing Act trial with Gary as part of his entry into camp.
- ^6 In episode 7, the camp was split into teams (Green and Gold) chosen by Gary and Cyrell as George had ranked them as the most and least famous campmates. Members of the teams would go head to head in trials where only the winner would get food for their team. The camp was reunited as one before the Networking trial.
- ^7 Gary and Cyrell, as team captains picked the trialists for each of their teams.
- ^8 Barry was chosen by "Royce the Tiny Rhino" and was made to pick the other three celebrities.
- ^9 Instead of stars, the celebrities were aiming to win McDonalds El Maco burgers, fries and soft drinks for the entire camp. They completed the whole trial and won El Maco Beef Burgers, El Maco McCrispy burgers, fries and soft drinks for the entire camp.
- ^10 The trialists were picked by "AI" and not necessarily "Royce the Tiny Rhino".
- ^11 Stars in this trial were won by the celebrities choosing eliminated celebrities to answer questions. For each correct question answered they earned half a star. As by the final questions the celebrities had only earned half a star, Julia announced that the final question would be worth three stars which the celebrities got correct.
- ^12 The trial was sponsored by Domain. After the trial ended, the celebrities were presented with a box filed with home comforts and to win the contents of the box, they had to answer one question without help from the eliminated celebrities. They had to name what Julia had mentioned she was missing most from home before the trial, and answered it correctly, winning the contents of the box which were later revealed to be freshly baked cookies.

=== Star count ===
Celebrity	Number of stars earned	Percentage	Trial Wins (in teams) (6)
Barry	23/27 stars	85.18%	N/A
Concetta	37.5/44 stars	85.22%	1/1
Cyrell	28.5/37 stars	77.02%	0/1
Deni	13/13 stars	100%	N/A
Dyson	24/24 stars	100%	0/1
Gary	21.5/30 stars	71.66%	1/1
George	24/32 stars	75%	0/1
Luke	24.5/27 stars	90.74%	1/1
Matt	17/21 stars	80.9%	N/A
Mia	26/26 stars	100%	N/A
Nath	24.5/33 stars	74.24%	0/1
Rachel	12/16 stars	75%	N/A
Rebekah	19.5/28 stars	69.64%	1/1

== Secret Challenges ==
=== Luke, Mia, Nath and Rebekah's secret mission (Day 12) ===
After the trial on Day 12, Luke, Mia, Nath and Rebekah were instructed to not tell their other campmates that they had won McDonalds and lied saying that they had only managed to win 4 stars. The completed this secret mission and the entire camp was awarded with their McDonalds for dinner that night.

=== Nath's secret mission (Day 13) ===
During Episode 13, to win a surprise birthday present, Nath had to complete three tasks while wearing silly underpants. Nath had to do ten lunges, hug a campmate and stoke the fire without his secret being discovered. After completing the tasks however Rebekah, George and Barry discovered his secret. Luckily it was completed before the campmates found out and Nath won the camp hot chocolate and a pamper back.

=== George's secret mission (Day 16) ===
During Episode 16, a game was played in the camp where each celebrity had to answer a simple question about themselves in order to win an ElMaco Chicken McWrap and would all almost certainly answer their questions correctly. An hour before the game, George was assigned secretly sabotage the challenge being "the mole" and to intentionally give a wrong answer. The celebrities thought they were playing for an El Maco Chicken McWrap each, however if George succeeded in his mission, they would not only all win McWraps but would also win a large soft drink for everyone as well. George succeeded in his challenge and acted down on himself enough to carry the story, winning a Wrap and large soft drink for everyone in camp.

=== Rebekah's secret mission (Day 18) ===
During Episode 18, Rebekah was secretly assigned to give each of her five remaining campmates an "obscure compliment". However, Nath had caught on, stupidly asking if she was on a secret mission, and Rebekah's attempt at the secret mission was deemed the worst attempt at a secret mission in I'm A Celebrity Get Me Out Of Here history and the reward was left unknown.

== Elephants' Graveyard ==
A new addition for this season saw the introduction of the Elephants' Graveyard, a separate campsite where certain celebrities were sent to stay, celebrities in this campsite had to win a challenge in order to escape the Elephants' Graveyard and return to camp. The campsite was later used for the elimination challenges.

Day	Episode	Celebrities in Elephant's Graveyard	Reason for entry	Challenge Winner
1-2	2	Cyrell & Matt	Cyrell and Matt were the first celebrities to stay here due to their late entry to camp.	Matt
2-3	3	Cyrell, Luke & Rebekah	Cyrell: Had to stay due to losing the previous challenge. Luke: Picked by Matt to enter the Elephants' Graveyard. Rebekah: Picked by Luke to enter the Elephants' Graveyard.	Luke
3-4	4	Cyrell, Gary & Rebekah	Cyrell and Rebekah: Had to stay due to losing the previous challenge. Gary: Picked by Luke to enter the Elephants' Graveyard.	None (13)

- ^13 There was no challenge to escape the camp as the celebrities in the main camp completed a challenge to rescue the three "banished" celebrities from the Elephants' Graveyard.

== Elimination Challenges ==
Due to the pre-recorded format, there were no votes from the public determining which celebrities would be eliminated. Instead the celebrities competed in elimination challenges inside the Elephants' Graveyard where the loser would be eliminated and exit the jungle through the "Tunnel of Doom".

Day	Episode	Elimination Challenge Name	Description	Participants	Eliminated
8	9	Game of Bluff	Celebrities picked up a coloured card and had to make their opponent believe it was the opposite colour. If their opponent guessed the wrong colour they would move a totem closer to them, if the opponent guessed the character the celebrity had, they moved the totem closer to the drawer. The first celebrity to have the totem placed on the skull and crossbones on their side would be eliminated.	Matt (Picked by Gold Team); Rachel (Picked by Green Team)	Rachel
11	11/12	Sticks and Stones of Doom	The celebrities had to rotate their section to be in play and remove sticks from a tower. The sticks were supporting stones and if the celebrities pulled the wrong stick, stones would drop into their section. The celebrity with the most stones in their section at the end would be eliminated.	Dyson (14); Luke (15); Matt (21) (Picked by the girls)	Matt
13	14	The Boat of Doom	The celebrities had to drop a coloured ball in the zigzag of tunnels and land it on the pontoon that is being towed by a "jungle boat". One at a time the celebrities had to attempt to time their drop perfectly so the ball would drop onto the pontoon after exiting the tunnels. The first celebrity to 5 points won the elimination challenge.	Barry (3); Rebekah (5) (Chosen by Dyson and Luke)	Barry
15	16	The Organ of Doom	The celebrities took turns repeating the sequence played by an organ. The sequence was extended by one note each round, meaning the challenge continually increased in difficulty. Both celebrities had three lives and lost a life each time they made a mistake. The first celebrity to lose all three lives would be eliminated.	Dyson (0); Gary (2) (Chosen by "The Letters of Doom")	Dyson
16	17	The Words of Doom	Each celebrity is shown a five-letter word, while their opponent is blindfolded and wearing headphones. The celebrities had to choose 2/5 letters to remove in order to make the word as hard as possible to guess. Their opponent is then given the category which the word belongs to and has to guess it within 30 seconds. If they guess correctly they win a point and the celebrity with the most points after 4 rounds wins. After 2 rounds it was tied at 2-2, and 3 letters a round started to be burnt, after 4 rounds, the scores were tied at 3-3 and as a tiebreaker, Robert and Julia chose the letters of the same word which both celebrities had to try to guess.	Cyrell; Mia (Chosen by the boys)	Mia
17	18	The Mud Pit of Doom	The three celebrities competed in a game of "Tactical Trivia", all of them were blindfolded and suspended over a mud pit with the same number of ropes supporting them, the number not known to them. The celebrities were asked a series of "closest to" questions, the closest celebrity to the answer, could cut one of their opponent's ropes, the first celebrity to lose all of their ropes and fall into the mud pit would be eliminated.	Concetta (2/6); George (0/6); Nath (3/6) (Automatically chosen for elimination)	George
18	19/20	The Ping-Pong Balls of Doom	The celebrities raced to blow a ball from bowl to bowl, starting at the end of a snake and to end up at the other end of the snake. They could use their hands to manoeuvre the bowls and only the bowls to give it the best chance to make it to the next bowl, but they could not touch the ball. If the ball fell off anywhere in the first section, they had to return it to the start. For the second section they had to return it to the start of the second section. The first celebrity to get their ball to the end landing it in the gold bowl win.	Cyrell; Rebekah (Least votes/Chosen by Concetta, Luke and Nath) (14)	Cyrell
19	20	Fight to the Finale	Fight to the Finale (Episode 20)	Concetta; Gary; Luke; Nath; Rebekah	Nath; Rebekah

- ^14 The final six celebrities had to choose two celebrities they would like most to see in the finale/win the series. The vote ended in a three-way tie with Gary, Cyrell and Rebekah with the fewest votes. Due to this Concetta, Luke and Nath chose the two celebrities out of the three to participate in the elimination. They chose Cyrell and Rebekah.

=== Fight to the Finale: (Episode 20) ===
The final five celebrities had to compete in a challenge to gain their place in the Grand Finale. The celebrities competed in a series of three games where the winner of each game would win a star, marking their place in the finale. The two celebrities not to win would be eliminated.

- Game 1: Hidden amongst a ton of corn, were stars. The first celebrity to find five stars would win a place in the final 3. However, the celebrities could not use their hands. The stars were magnetic and the only way to gather them was by wearing a pair of "magnet pants".
- Game 2: On a board there were thirteen middle names, one for each celebrity. One at a time the celebrities had to step up to the board and try to match all thirteen middle names to their celebrity. Once the answers were locked in the board would light up the correct names. The celebrity who got all the names to light up would win their place in the finale.
- Game 3: The third game was a puzzle. The celebrities' puzzle pieces were in box in front of them, however the puzzle things were not the only things in those boxes which also included tarantulas and snakes. The first celebrity to complete their puzzle would win the final place in the finale.

Game No.	Participants	Winner	Eliminated
#1	Concetta (2); Gary (1); Luke (5); Nath (1); Rebekah (1)	Luke	N/A
#2	Concetta; Gary; Nath; Rebekah	Concetta	N/A
#3	Gary; Nath; Rebekah	Gary	Nath; Rebekah

== Ratings ==
I'm a Celebrity...Get Me Out of Here! (season 12) National Reach and National Total ratings, with nightly position
Week	Episode		Original airdate	Timeslot (approx.)	National Reach Viewers (millions)	National Total Viewers (millions)	Nightly rank	Source
1	1	"Opening Night"	18 January 2026	Sunday 7:00 pm	1.698	0.925	6	
1	2	"Episode 2"	19 January 2026	Monday 7:30 pm	1.502	0.830	7	
1	3	"Episode 3"	20 January 2026	Tuesday 7:30 pm	1.242	0.735	10	
1	4	"Episode 4"	21 January 2026	Wednesday 7:30 pm	1.244	0.693	10	
2	5	"Episode 5"	25 January 2026	Sunday 7:00 pm	1.105	0.612	9	
2	6	"Episode 6"	26 January 2026	Monday 7:30 pm	1.233	0.704	10	
2	7	"Episode 7"	27 January 2026	Tuesday 7:30 pm	1.253	0.738	11	
2	8	"Episode 8"	28 January 2026	Wednesday 7:30 pm	1.222	0.716	10	
3	9	"Episode 9"	1 February 2026	Sunday 7:00 pm	1.117	0.658	9	
3	10	"Episode 10"	2 February 2026	Monday 7:30 pm	1.097	0.593	12	
3	11	"Episode 11"	3 February 2026	Tuesday 7:30 pm	1.076	0.570	12	
3	12	"Episode 12"	4 February 2026	Wednesday 7:30 pm	1.079	0.571	12	
4	13	"Episode 13"	8 February 2026	Sunday 7:00 pm	0.958	0.548	12	
4	14	"Episode 14"	9 February 2026	Monday 7:30 pm	1.015	0.541	17	
4	15	"Episode 15"	10 February 2026	Tuesday 7:30 pm	0.982	0.528	15	
4	16	"Episode 16"	11 February 2026	Wednesday 7:30 pm	0.953	0.501	15	
5	17	"Episode 17"	15 February 2026	Sunday 7:00 pm	0.912	0.490	16	
5	18	"Episode 18"	16 February 2026	Monday 7:30 pm	0.921	0.512	19	
5	19	"Episode 19"	17 February 2026	Tuesday 7:30 pm	0.938	0.513	13	
5	20	"Episode 20"	18 February 2026	Wednesday 7:30 pm	0.879	0.485	15	
6	21	"Grand Finale"	22 February 2026	Sunday 7:00 pm	0.942	0.571	16	
