= Jen Oldershaw =

Australian radio personality

Jen Oldershaw began as a presenter on Triple J, presenting music shifts. She presented the Morning Show in 1996 and 1997 and Breakfast with Mikey Robins and the Sandman in 1998 before becoming the producer of Merrick and Rosso's drivetime radio show on Triple J during 1999 and 2000.

When Merrick & Rosso left Triple J, moving to the Sydney commercial radio station Nova 96.9, Jen went with them continuing as their producer until she left in 2002. She can be heard on Merrick & Rosso's CD Choice Cuts.

Since 2001 she has done retail and corporate voiceover work for 10 years was the continuity voice of for ABC TV. She can still be heard on the warnings at the beginning of ABC TV programs.

From 2003 she worked at The Australian Film Television and Radio School as a lecturer and travelled the country running courses teaching radio skills.

In late 2005 she returned to radio and until recently was heard 12pm - 3pm weekdays on the new commercial radio station Vega 95.3 in Sydney. At the end of 2008, Oldershaw resigned from Vega 95.3 to return to lecturing at the Australian Film Television and Radio School.
