= Doctor Poo (radio series) =

Australian series from 1979 to 1981

Doctor Poo badge

Dr Poo was a radio serial which aired for over 400 episodes on Australian youth station Triple J. It aired as a two-minute segment of Doug Mulray's morning show, at around 7:20 a.m. and 8:20 a.m. weekdays, from May 1979 to January 1981. It was a Doctor Who parody with an Australian twist.

The voice of the Doctor was Lance Curtis, supported by Geoff Kelso as Kevin the Announcer, Steve Johnston as Dana Sock, and Ken Matthews.

A two-page comic strip version of Dr Poo also appeared in Stir Magazine. The titular character was drawn in Tom Baker's Doctor costume.

The segment received a vinyl and cassette tape album release titled Knees Ahoy! in December 1980. An extended play, The Universe is Big by Dr Poo and the Psychic Koalas, was also recorded in 1981 but not released until 1985 following the death of Curtis.

== Sources ==
- Whoniverse site: Dr Poo co uk, 2008
- Sawyer, M. (2005). "There is only one Doctor: Poo". smh.com.au.
