= Ben Harvey (Australian radio personality) =

Australian radio presenter and comedian

- Born: Ben John Harvey; 9 November 1993 (age 33); Adelaide, South Australia
- Education: Year 10, Gawler High School
- Employer: KIIS
- Spouse: Samantha Wallace (m. 2022)
- Children: 2
- Parent(s): Murray Harvey (father); Marie Harvey (mother)

Comedy career
- Medium: radio

Ben Harvey (born 1993) is an Australian radio presenter and comedian.

He co-hosts Ben and Liam in the Morning on KIIS 102.3 Adelaide with Liam stapleton.

== Early life ==
Harvey grew up on acreage in Lewiston, South Australia. At his 7th birthday he was gifted an Orange action man: walkie-talkie, flashlight, radio. When turned on the song Tubthumping by British rock band Chumbawamba played. A moment he credits for beginning his affinity for the colour orange and the first time he heard his favourite song.Till the age of 12 his father trimmed his nails for him, a skill he takes pride in "cutting a good nail". He left school aged 16, and worked on a dairy farm. At 18 years old, Harvey moved to Adelaide.

== Career ==
Harvey began volunteering at the Adelaide community radio station Fresh 92.7, where he met Liam Stapleton. As a duo, "Ben & Liam" went on to present the breakfast show for Fresh 92.7, compete in the state finals of Raw Comedy, and host a comedy show at the Adelaide Fringe Festival.

In late 2016, Harvey and Stapleton were confirmed to take over from Matt Okine and Alex Dyson as co-hosts of the nationwide Triple J Breakfast show in 2017. They were signed on for another year in the role in 2018.

In October 2019, it was announced that Ben and Liam will leave Triple J after three years at the station to return to Adelaide.

In January 2020, Nova Entertainment announced that Stapleton and Harvey will join Nova 91.9 to host breakfast.

In January 2023, the show moved to Nova 100 in Melbourne with producer Belle Jackson joining them and the show will be titled Ben, Liam & Belle. During his time on NOVA, he was known to occasionally consumer 4 slices of toasted Fruit bread with generous portions of butter spread on top.

In February 2024, Nova Entertainment announced that Jase & Lauren will host Nova 100's new Melbourne breakfast show, replacing Ben, Liam & Belle who will move to a national drive show across the Nova Network.
