= Caroline Tran =

Radio personality

Caroline "Caz" Tran (born 1971) is an Australian music radio announcer. She has presented on the Triple J and Double J stations.

Tran immigrated with her family from Saigon, Vietnam, to Australia in 1975. After attending Macquarie University, she worked as a part-time receptionist and producer at 2SM. She graduated from the Australian Film, Television and Radio School in 1998 and later that year became a presenter for Triple J's midnight to early morning show. By the end of 1998, Tran became a presenter for Triple J's primetime show. Tran began working at Double J in 2014 and was working there when the radio station reached its 10th anniversary in 2024.

== Early life and early career ==
Tran was born in 1971. When she was three years old, Tran travelled by boat in 1975 from Saigon in Vietnam to Australia. The year after immigrating, she and her family were residents of a hostel in Nunawading, Victoria, for refugees. The family later made their home in Ringwood, Victoria. During her early years, she listened to the music radio station Triple J. In her youth, she perceived herself as an outsider, so she tuned in to the radio to pick up Australian culture and Australian humour. Tran completed her secondary education in 1988 and attended Macquarie University, where she took a class on radio broadcasting. After graduation, Tran worked part-time for 2SM where she responded to calls, recorded voice-overs, and was a receptionist, producer, and panellist. She worked on Clive Robertson's Breakfast Show and fetched coffee for him. Tran spent time travelling outside Australia and worked at Shop Assistants' Union.

== Career ==
Tran received a degree from the Australian Film, Television and Radio School in August 1998. After Tran prepared a "demonstration tape" for Triple J, she was interviewed for the midnight to early morning show in November 1998. Owing to how well she did in the role, the station selected her the next month to announce during the prime time window of 6pm to 10pm. She took over the role from Jane Gazzo and was the announcer for the Super Requests programme which aired on weekdays. Super Requests is a radio programme that enables students to call in to ask for songs to be played. Community newspapers from the Vietnamese community covered her selection. Within a year of becoming presenter, Tran caused a modest boost in the programme's total listenership in Melbourne and Sydney. Stephen Brook of The Australian found that Tran's "tinkling chuckle and unassuming big-sisterly manner" drew in more people than the typical high school audience.

With the aim of immersing herself in Melbourne's music offerings, Tran moved from Sydney to Melbourne around 1999. Tran switched to the noon to 3:00pm time window at the beginning of 2001. She became the announcer for the Triple J music show Home and Hosed, a role she held for at least three years. Reflecting on Triple J's 40th anniversary in 2015, the singer-songwriter Ella Hooper said that in her youth the radio station provided her with role models including Tran whom she called "smart and sassy".

At Double J's launch in 2014, Tran began working for the station. Airing on Saturday afternoons, her show had live performances and archived content. Tran has worked continuously at Double J for 10 years.
