= The Race Race =

The Race Race was a 2008 radio show on Australia-wide radio station Triple J by Australian comedian team The Chaser. It was hosted by Chaser members Craig Reucassel and Chris Taylor, with guest appearances from fellow Chaser member Chas Licciardello. The show directly commented on the 2008 United States presidential election.

The show ran for eight episodes from 27 October until 5 November, in the weekday timeslot of 5pm until 5.30pm, with the election of 4 November. It was mostly made up of sarcastic and irreverent humour, utilising candidates' gaffes and other soundbites.
