= Talkback Classroom =

Talkback Classroom is best known as a forum for young people to interview politicians and other leading decision makers in forums recorded for broadcast and is also known as a Voice for the Voteless on the basis of its mission to provide an opportunity for young people to take part in civic dialogue. The forum started as a classroom based project instigated by Alexandra Secondary School teacher Stephen Cutting in 1995 and provided an opportunity for secondary school students to conduct interviews (initially by telephone) with people in the news. The activity proved very popular with students and in 1996 was first heard as a segment on ABC Regional Radio Albury Wodonga via a three way 'hook up' between students in the classroom, the segment guest or interviewee and the radio program host. In 1997 the project became a monthly national forum for senior secondary school students, broadcast on ABCyouth network Triple J produced by Stephen Cutting who had taken up a secondment to ABC Radio. Talkback Classroom ran as a regular segment featuring interviews recorded by student interviewers with leading political figures in Australian politics and other decision makers until 2001 when the segment became a live forum based at the National Museum of Australia and shifted to Radio National as part of the Life Matters program and ABC's digital network Fly TV. From 2001 to 2008 the forum was held at the National Museum of Australia, and involved secondary school students from around Australia interviewing various prominent politicians, business and community leaders on current affairs issues. Guests included two heads of government: John Howard (Australia) and Helen Clark (New Zealand), ministers and shadow ministers and many other decision makers and opinion shapers

== International forums ==
During the seven years the forum ran at the National Museum of Australia the project developed an international profile with three panellists from Australia and three from another country interviewing a guest via video link. Talkback Classroom forums ran in partnership with the Smithsonian Institution in the United States, and in 2005 worked with the United Nations when Shashi Tharoor, the UN Under-Secretary-General for Communications and Public Information, was interviewed from United Nations headquarters. In June 2006, the first international forum featuring all students interviewing in a country other than Australia included two Australians working with two students from South Korea in Seoul; the guest was Chung-in Moon, a professor of Political Science at Yonsei University. In 2007 students from Korea visited Australia to join two Australian to undertake an investigation into issues pertaining to the theme of Energy. The students then recorded an interview with the then Foreign Minister Alexander Downer. The student investigation and subsequent interview with Downer was the subject of a one-hour documentary broadcast on Korean television network EBS.

Through the international forums project founder Stephen Cutting and National Museum Education Manager developed a pedagogical model referred to as the Learning Journey whereby participating students were 'immersed' in an investigation for each forum and took part in an intensive program of interviews and activities with experts and other people connected with the theme with the object of ensuring that students were knowledgeable and passionate about issues they would raise at the forum which represented the culmination of each international project.

After losing the forum venue and major sponsor - the National Museum - project founder Stephen Cutting approached the National Press Club of Australia to host the forum. In March 2009 the Press Club hosted the Australia Japan forum featuring a panel of Australian and Japanese students interviewing the Australian Foreign Minister Stephen Smith and the Japanese Ambassador Taka-aki Kojima. The Australia Japan forum represented the first Talkback Classroom Learning Journey to take students to both countries as they investigated Australia/Japan relations. The forum was funded by the Australia Japan Foundation. In 2010 the project was taken up in Malaysia when a joint Australian/Malaysian student team took part in an investigation into the theme of Education in Malaysia and took part at a forum hosted by the Australian High Commission in Kuala Lumpur. In the same year project founder Stephen Cutting introduced the project to students in Thailand and conducted a one-week professional development workshop around ways to engage students in the classroom based on the pedagogy of Talkback Classroom. In 2012 students in Thailand and Australia teamed up to conduct the last Talkback Classroom forum, an investigation into 'popular culture' in Australia and Thailand and took part in a forum involving students in Melbourne at Coburg Senior High school and Nonthaburi school in Bangkok.
