= Liam Stapleton =

Australian radio presenter (born 1996)

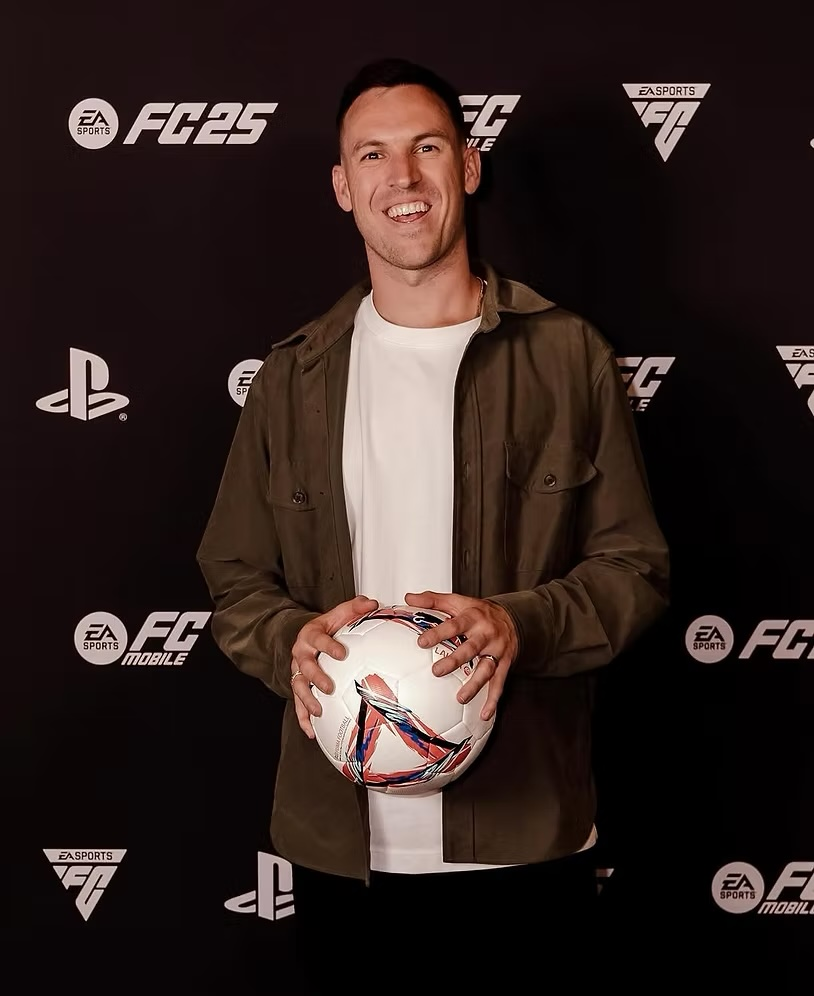
- Stapleton at the EA FC25 game release event.
- Born: June 13, 1996 (age 30)
- Education: Pedare Christian College
- Occupations: Radio presenter, comedian
- Height: 183 cm (6 ft 0 in)
- Spouse: Sarah Crisanti (m. 2023)

Liam Stapleton is an Australian radio presenter and comedian.

He co-hosts Ben and Liam in the Morning on KIIS 102.3 Adelaide with Ben Harvey.

== Early life ==
The son of Tom and Leanne Stapleton, Liam grew up in the suburbs of Adelaide. He was born with the rare congenital condition of Urethral Duplication, which he colloquially termed a "double barrelled shotgun". This was discovered in middle school when they sought out medical treatment for his lack of aim in the bathroom, in which he underwent an operation to "crush the second gun/barrell". Additionally, he described himself in his childhood as being ferocious when it came to Nocturnal enuresis or the act of bed wetting as its informally known as, which made sleepovers difficult for him. This habit of involuntary urination also occurred during an athletics carnival where his theory of running faster with urinary retention or "hold in wee" as he describes it. In his childhood he also succumbed to an episode of testicular torsion. As a child he also attended Kumon due to his "genuine" learning difficulties. Up until his teens he had passed out a total of 3 times when being injected with MRI contrasting agent or from drawing blood.

== Career ==
Stapleton began his radio career aged 14 years old at the Adelaide community radio station Fresh 92.7, where he met Ben Harvey. As a duo, "Ben & Liam" went on to present the breakfast show for Fresh 92.7, compete in the state finals of Raw Comedy, and host a comedy show at the Adelaide Fringe Festival.

In late 2016, Harvey and Stapleton were confirmed to take over from Matt Okine and Alex Dyson as co-hosts of the nationwide Triple J Breakfast show in 2017. They were signed on for another year in the role in 2018. In October 2019, it was announced that Ben and Liam would leave Triple J after three years at the station to return to Adelaide.

In January 2020, Nova Entertainment announced that Stapleton and Harvey would join Nova 91.9 to host breakfast.

In January 2023, the show moved to Nova 100 in Melbourne with producer Belle Jackson joining them in a show titled Ben, Liam & Belle.

In February 2024, Nova Entertainment announced that Jase & Lauren would host Nova 100's new Melbourne breakfast show, replacing Ben, Liam & Belle.

In April 2026, they started their morning show with KIIS 102.3 Adelaide, after their contracts not being renewed by the Nova.

== Interests ==
Since a child Stapleton has been a Liverpool F.C fan. In 2025 he attended the match against Tottenham Hotspur at Anfield where they won 5-1 to clinch the 2024-25 Premier League title.
