= Lance Curtis =

Australian actor, writer and comedian

Lance Charles Curtis, was an Australian actor, writer and comedian who became well known in Australia in the early 1980s through his many radio, TV and film appearances. He was best known for his work on Triple J's Off The Record and The J-Team with comedians Angela Webber and Adam Bowen and presenters Jonathan Coleman, Ian Rogerson and Rusty Nails.

Curtis was also well-known for his comic partnership with satirist Geoff Kelso, which included their collaboration on Double J's Doctor Who sendup Doctor Poo, which ran from 1979-81 (not to be confused with the 1996 Viz comic strip of the same name). The team released an LP record, Dr Poo: Knees Ahoy! An EP, The Universe is Big by "Dr Poo and the Psychic Koalas" was recorded in 1981 but not released. It included five songs based around the major characters of the series. It was eventually released in 1985, as a tribute after the sudden death of Lance Curtis.

Curtis' regular Off The Record and J-Team characters included nervous teenage Double J work-experience intern Wayne Simpson - who nursed a deep unrequited passion for Bananarama singer Siobhan Fahey - and doddering pensioner Harold Davenport, the foil for Angela Webber's "punk grannie" character Lillian Pascoe. In one famous segment broadcast after the federal election of 1983, Curtis and his colleagues lampooned the defeat of the then Liberal government led by Malcolm Fraser (who famously broke down and cried on camera when conceding defeat) by portraying Davenport's deep distress at being deposed as president of his local bowls club.

In the early 1980s, Curtis made numerous appearances on the Donnie Sutherland-hosted music programmes Sounds and After Dark. He had a regular segment on Sounds (as Wayne Simpson), called Wayne at Work, and he also made several memorable appearances in character on After Dark, including the humourless Det. Sgt. Frank Masarati of the NSW Police Entertainment Squad (whose job was to carry out "random laughter tests"), and as Harold Davenport, who appeared in a parody of contemporary pop duo Haysi Fantayzee with his "deeply platonic" friend Lillian Pascoe (Webber). Excerpts from several of Curtis' appearances on After Dark were compiled as a tribute to him and included in the final episode of the series, which went to air the week after Curtis died.

One of Curtis' final screen performances was a minor role as a nosy neighbour in the 1985 movie Rebel, which starred Matt Dillon and Debra Byrne.

== Death ==
Lance Curtis died on 9 June 1985 as the result of an accidental fall from a balcony, whilst hosting a party at his Sydney home. His J-Team colleague Angela Webber died of breast cancer in 2007.
