= Radio producer =

Person who supervises the production of a radio show

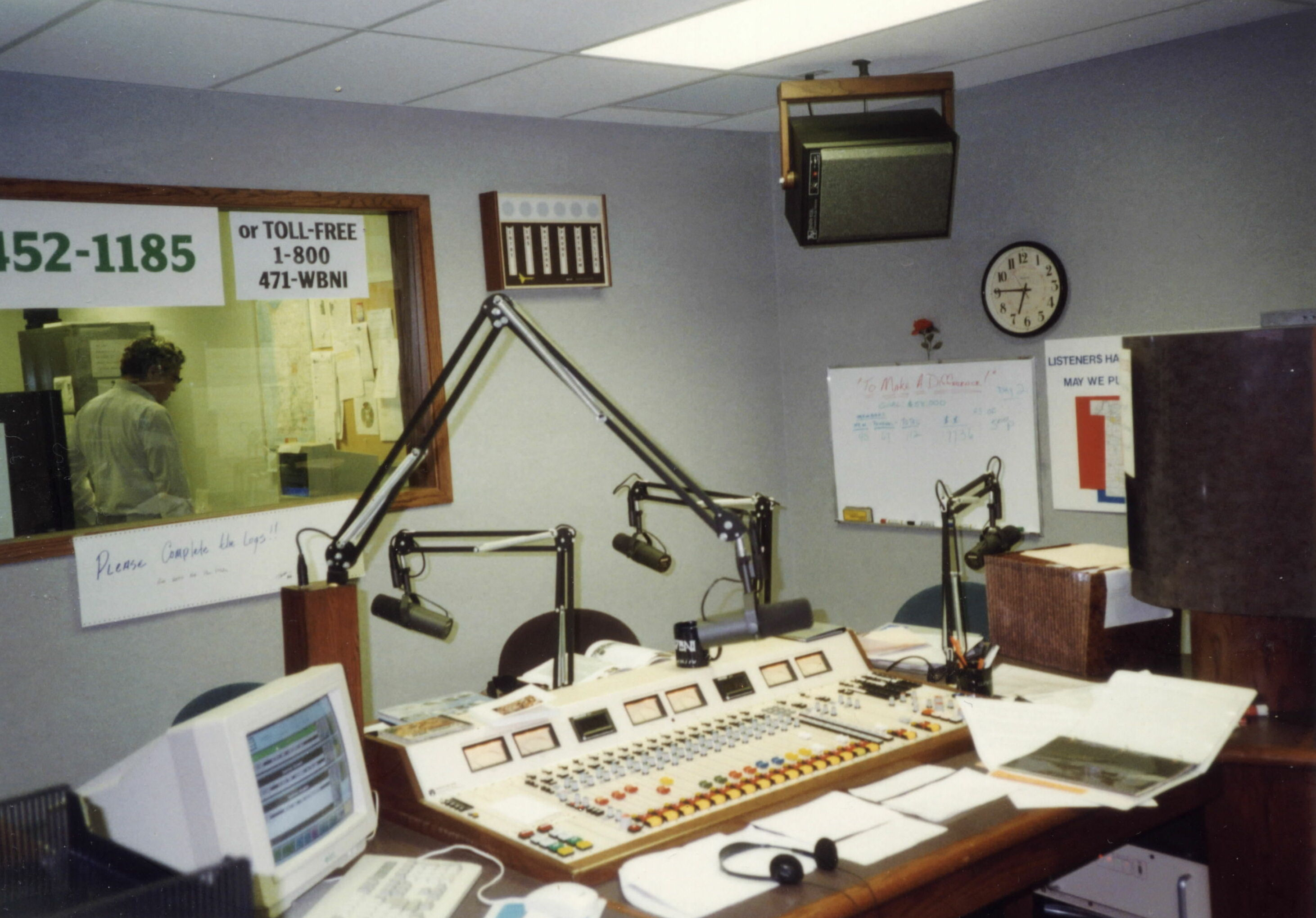
In this studio from radio station WBNI, the producer sits in the foreground and operates the mixing console, while the on-air performers sit across the table and speak into the microphones.

A radio producer oversees the making of a radio show. The job title covers several different job descriptions:

- Content producers or executive producers oversee and orchestrate a radio show or feature. The content producer might organize music choices, guests and callers for a talk radio show or competitions, timings and overall show content.
- Creative producers, imaging specialists or imaging producers ("Imaging" in the radio business relates to brand management rather than visual material) produce audio content for the show, such as sound clips used on the show and "promo clips" (radio commercials and commercial bumpers used on the same station to promote the show).
- The board operator or technical operator operates the technical controls—such as sound volume levels, recording software and switchboard. The producer can be in a separate control room separated from the radio studio by a window, which allowed visual contact while blocking noise. With quieter switches and better directional microphones, the producer and the controls may be at the same table as the on-air talent (as shown here) without adding unwanted sound to the product.

Many radio stations and radio networks have a production director who oversees the above responsibilities. This individual or a production staff may do the production work for many shows or many stations.
