= Home and Hosed =

- Genre: Australian music
- Running time: 2 hours (7:00 pm – 9:00 pm)
- Country of origin: Australia
- Home station: Triple J
- Hosted by: Anika Luna
- Original release: 2003–present
- Website: Official website

Home and Hosed is the flagship Australian music radio show airing on national youth broadcaster Triple J. Across two hours on weekday evenings, the show features new local music, artist interviews and touring information, and offers airplay to unsigned musicians. From August 2025, it has been hosted by Anika Luna.

The format has its origins in Richard Kingsmill's Australian Music Show, which broadcast from 1991 to 2003. It was replaced by The Local, but renamed to Home and Hosed, initially hosted by Robbie Buck.

== History ==
From 1991 to 2003, Richard Kingsmill hosted the Australian Music Show, also known as the Oz Music Show, from 10:00 pm to 1:00 am on Wednesday nights. Live performances were broadcast from the Triple J studios weekly.

After Kingsmill's program ended, a new program for 2003 was announced titled The Local, hosted by Robbie Buck. Its initial format was a two-hour show every weeknight from 9:00 pm to 11:00 pm. The show was renamed to Home and Hosed later that year.

In 2011, the program's runtime was reduced to one hour, and moved earlier in the evening. From 2024, the program was again expanded to two hours.

At the 2026 Australian Audio Awards, Home and Hosed presenter Anika Luna won Best Australian Music Show/Music Programmer.

== Compilation albums ==
Triple J issued the first Home and Hosed compilation CD in 2003, releasing four editions in total, with its last in 2006. The albums featured some of the best local music featured on the program.

== Hosts ==
- Anika Luna (2025–present)
- Ash McGregor (2023–2025)
- Declan Byrne (2018–2022)
- Dom Alessio (2009–2017)
- Caroline Tran (2006–2009)
- Robbie Buck (2003–2005)
