= Mel Bampton =

Australian radio announcer

Melissa "Mel" Bampton is an Australian radio announcer, best known for her work on the Triple J network.

She began at the station in 2000 as a presenter before taking on the role of producer of the Drive show – with Costa Zouliou, Myf Warhurst, Nicole Fossati and Charlie Pickering at various times. In mid-2002, Fossati left the station, and Bampton took her place as co-host alongside Pickering.

== Career ==
In 2004 the station's programming underwent changes, and Bampton started hosting her own music show Mel in the Mornings. The show replaced the previous Morning Show, which was current affairs and talkback, with a more music-oriented show, including interviews and live performances. Bampton was the creator of the Like a Version segment of bands playing cover songs, which has led to nine CDs and is still on the triple j breakfast program.

On 26 January 2007, Bampton ended her role as a triple j presenter. In late 2007 Bampton presented and produced the second Producer Series for triple j.

In 2008, Bampton produced and presented The Album Series for triple j which took a look at four outstanding Australian Albums, by artists: Sarah Blasko, The Living End, Hoodoo Gurus and Regurgitator. The Album Series featured on triple j in late 2008.

Bampton produced and presented the third season of The Producer Series, which aired on Triple J in 2009.

Bampton was the music and books editor for 'alternative mainstream' women's magazine yen between 2008 and 2012, and was also the Director of a Byron Bay-based media company that worked with Soundwave Festival, and musical artists Ash Grunwald and Dune Rats.

In 2025 Bampton returned to the ABC, backfilling across the network before accepting a role as presenter of Saturday Breakfast for 612 ABC Brisbane.

== Personal life ==
Bampton is married, and has three children.
