= Blak Out =

Australian radio program

- Running time: 1 hour (5:00 pm – 6:00 pm)
- Country of origin: Australia
- Home station: Triple J
- Hosted by: Nooky
- Original release: 20 June 2021
- Opening theme: Original song by Trials
- Website: www.abc.net.au/triplej/programs/blak-out

Blak Out is an Australian radio program playing music from Aboriginal and Torres Strait Islander artists. It is broadcast every Sunday evening on the national youth broadcaster Triple J. Since its inception in 2021, Yuin and Thunghutti rapper Nooky has hosted, playing an eclectic mix of R&B, hip-hop and contemporary pop music, and conducting interviews.

== History ==
Blak Out was launched on 20 June 2021, promising to “represent the present, remember the past, showcase the future.” The National Indigenous Music Awards were broadcast live on Blak Out that year, adapting to the COVID-19 pandemic.

On 15 October 2023, following the failure of the Indigenous voice to parliament referendum, Nooky used Blak Out to monologue and play “Treaty” by Yothu Yindi on repeat for an hour, attracting media attention.

Blak Out has hosted and supported showcases of emerging Indigenous artists at events like South by Southwest, with the 2023 iteration curated by the Kid Laroi.
