= Jase, Lauren & Clint =

Australian breakfast radio show

- Other names: Jase & Lauren in the Morning
- Genre: Radio show
- Running time: 180 minutes Monday – Friday; 5:30 am – 9:00 am
- Country of origin: Australia
- Language: English
- Home station: Nova 100 Melbourne
- Hosted by: Jason 'Jase' Hawkins Lauren Phillips; Clint Stanaway
- Executive producer: Brodie Pummeroy
- Original release: 9 August 2021
- Audio format: Stereo
- Website: Jase, Lauren & Clint
- Podcast: Podcast

Jase, Lauren & Clint is an Australian breakfast radio show on Nova 100 in Melbourne. It is hosted by Jason Hawkins, Lauren Phillips and Clint Stanaway.

The show airs from 5:30 am to 9 am on weekday mornings with music and daily topic discussions and special guests. A highlights package of the show, airs across the Nova Network on Saturday and Sunday from 8 am and 10 am.

A daily podcast featuring the best bits from each show is available on the Nova Player as is the podcast for all other Nova FM shows in Australia.

== History ==
=== KIIS 1011 ===
In July 2021, Australian Radio Network announced that Lauren Phillips would join co-host Jason 'Jase' Hawkins from 9 August 2021 on the KIIS 101.1 breakfast program. Hawkins had previously co-hosted with Polly 'PJ' Harding on the breakfast program Jase & PJ. Following the departure of Harding on 23 July 2021, the show was relaunched with Lauren Phillips.

On 30 July 2021, a one-hour pop-up show was heard on the air a week before the official launch. Jase and Lauren introduced new friends of the show. Clint Stanaway replaces Sacha Barbour Gatt as the show's newsreader, while Christian Petracca provided weekly contributions.

In December 2022, Alice James was announced as new executive producer of the program, replacing Luke James.

In November 2023, after months of media speculation, it was announced that The Kyle and Jackie O Show would be networked from KIIS 106.5 Sydney in 2024, effectively ending Jase & Lauren. The final show aired on Friday 1 December 2023.

=== Nova 100 ===
In February 2024, Nova Entertainment announced that Jase & Lauren will host Nova 100’s new Melbourne breakfast show, replacing Ben, Liam & Belle who will move to a national drive show across the Nova Network. Their first show aired on 8 March 2024 with Brodie Pummeroy as executive producer.

Ben French and Jaz Keane returned to the team in April 2024 after departing non-compete island. Perri Cassie joined the team in June 2024 after also departing non-compete island Gold 104.3.

In May 2024, Nova announced that highlights from the weekly breakfast show will air across the Nova Network on Saturday and Sunday from 8 am – 10 am.

During the 2024 Summer Olympics in Paris, Clint Stanaway contributed remotely due to his role with Nine's Olympic reporting team, however was unable to discuss any Olympic content due to the station not holding official broadcasting rights.

In September 2025, Stanaway announced his departure from the Nine Network after 25 years to focus on radio.

In 2026, Hawkins and Stanaway began hosting an early show from 5:30am, with Phillips joining the program from 6:00am.

In May 2026, Stanaway was added to the program title, with the show rebranded as Jase, Lauren & Clint. The change formalised his role as a full member of the on‑air team rather than solely the newsreader.

== Podcast ==
The show is available as a daily podcast featuring the best bits from each show. Bonus content is available to listeners with a post show podcast The Daily Wrap, discussing behind the scenes topics of the show with several producers and on air talent. It often includes adult humor and language. A Producers' Pod is recorded during the non-survey period by members of the production team.

In the episode released on 9 July 2024, the team revealed an interesting fact about themselves which nobody would know as a trap for the co-hosts. This would reveal if they had been listening to their show during the survey break. Jaz Keane revealed he can ride a unicycle, Perri Cassie had a successful career as a stand-up comedian and Brodie Pummeroy can speed read. In the following episode Alison Munro is a keen scuba diver and was on the team who won the Outstanding Nature Documentary Emmy Award for the documentary Puff: Wonders of the Reef, Ben French was the voice of an animated hedgehog named Jacko for a television commercial in the United States. During the podcast on 21 August 2024, the producing team each revealed their interesting fact to Jase, Lauren and Clint whom were all surprised and admitted not listening to the producer podcast whilst on survey break.

== Ratings ==
In July 2024, the show rose to number 2 in the Melbourne FM breakfast radio ratings. The show increased listener share by 0.9 points to 9.6, with a cumulative audience of 651,000.

In August 2024, GfK Survey 5, the show rose to number 1 in the Melbourne FM breakfast radio ratings surpassing leaders Fifi, Fev & Nick with a 9.9 point share.

In November 2024, Jase & Lauren returned to the top FM breakfast spot with GfK Survey 7. Up 1.4 points to 11 share gaining 34,000 in cume. Leapfrogging the previous ladder leaders Fifi, Fev & Nick on Fox FM, who now sit second (+0.2 to 10.2).

In December 2024, Jase & Lauren continued to dominate the FM breakfast radio ratings with an 11.5% share (+0.5).

In March 2025, Jase & Lauren dropped to the #2FM Melbourne Breakfast Show for the 1st Radio Ratings Survey of 2025. They were overtaken by The Christian O'Connell Breakfast Show on Gold 104.3.

== Awards and nominations ==
| Year | Award | Category | Nominee | Result |
|---|---|---|---|---|
| 2022 | ACRA Awards | Best Entertainment Presenter (Metro) | Jason Hawkins | Nominated |
| 2023 | ACRA Awards | Individual Talent of the Year Award (Metro) | Jason Hawkins | Nominated |
| 2023 | ACRA Awards | Best Digital Content Creator | Jack Erickson | Nominated |
| 2024 | ACRA Awards | Best On Air Team (Metro) | Jason Hawkins, Lauren Phillips, Clint Stanaway | Nominated |

== Major Competitions ==
In June 2024, Jase & Lauren launched a Hide & Seek competition across Melbourne. The winner would receive $250,000 less $1 for every second they were not found. The competition was restricted to the hours of 6 am to 6 pm and the team stated they were not hiding in a school, hospital or private house. Clues were announced via radio and social media. The competition concluded on 17 July 2024 after 5 days. The team were found in a vacant office building in South Melbourne. The winners receiving a total of $84,323.

In September 2024, to celebrate the teams 100th show, Jase & Lauren offered Melbourne listeners the opportunity to win $100,000 over a two-week period. The contestants joined the team in studio, between 7:00 am – 9:00 am. The winner requiring to nominate the exact minute the prize was on offer during the two hour window.

In June 2025, Jase & Lauren played another Hide & Seek competition across Melbourne. This time the team not knowing their hiding location, giving listeners clues based on what they see and hear. The hunt officially began at 8 am on Thursday, 19 June and concluding at 4 pm on Sunday 22 June, after 79 hours in hiding. The winner Charles received $94,477 after finding the trio at 16 Sandilands St in South Melbourne.

In February 2026, Jase & Lauren broadcast live from California as part of their ‘Californian Road Trip’ promotion, giving listeners the chance to win a holiday to the United States. The show broadcast from several locations across the state, including Los Angeles, Palm Springs and San Francisco.

In October 2026, the Hide & Seek competition returned across Melbourne across five separate occasions over a two week period. Jase Lauren & Clint would go into hiding between 6am and 9am with an opportunity to win $10,000. If they were not found the cash would jackpot and roll over to the next hide.

== Segments ==
- Overrated / Underrated: Each week, Jase, Lauren and Clint ask listeners what they consider to be overrated and underrated.
- Melbourne Whispers: Listeners who have heard a rumour about something around Melbourne are invited to divulge the secret. Callers can remain anonymous.
- Lights On Singalong Song: Jase, Lauren and Clint select a banger song to play each Friday morning and ask listeners to switch their lights on to see who is listening to the song.
- Words you Cannot Say: Callers are asked to put a word they find difficult to pronounce into a sentence. Jase, Lauren and Clint attempt to guess it.
- Probe the Po-Po: Each week members of Victoria Police explain their specialised roles within the force.
- Loz's Lips: Whilst Lauren is wearing noise cancelling headphones, Jase or Clint asks Lauren to repeat a sentence to test out Lauren's lip reading ability.
- 5k Question: The caller has the choice of an easy $50, medium $500 or hard $5,000 question. They must answer correctly within 3 seconds to win.
- Naughty Naughty 6:40: Jase, Lauren and Clint discuss risque topics at 6:40 am which are unsuitable for little ears.
- The Experts: Jase, Lauren and Clint interview a specialist about a niche topic.
- Mystery Guest: A well known guest is brought into the studio whilst being "gift wrapped". Jase, Lauren and Clint must guess the persons identity by asking a series of yes or no questions.
- Describe Your Partner as a Meal: Callers describe their partner as a meal where an amusing hidden meaning is usually implied.
- Lauren Doesn't Know: Callers provide a usually useless fact they think Lauren won't know.
- Milestone Monday: Callers share a milestone with Jase, Lauren and Clint which they are proud of.
- Melbourne's Best: Jase, Lauren and Clint rate classic Australian foods from three different locations. Past categories include: best cinnamon scroll, potato cake.
- Sing For: Callers must sing a song to win the item on offer, using adapted lyrics referencing the item.
- Joe's Joke: Each Friday the team catch-up with Joe to listen to a (dad) joke, as his workmates don't give him the credit he deserves.

== Past Segments ==
- Tradie Trivia: Each morning, Jase & Lauren will pit the two players from different professions against each other when they challenge them to answer five general knowledge questions.
- $5K Word Play: A word association game. The caller selects Jase, Lauren or Clint to play. If Jase, Lauren or Clint match 5 words specified by the caller from a range of topics the caller wins $5,000.

== Team members ==
Jase, Lauren & Clint have two content producers, two audio producers and a digital producer.

| Name | Nickname | Role | Years | Notes |
|---|---|---|---|---|
| Jason Hawkins | Jase | Co-host | 2021–present | Anchor, panel operator of the show. Self-appointed morale man. Hung-over Hank is his alter ego. Previously co-host on KIIS 101.1's Jase & PJ in the morning, and co-host of Couch Time on Eleven. |
| Lauren Phillips | Loz | Co-host | 2021–present | Co-host. Postcards presenter and previously was Weekend Today weather presenter on the Nine Network. |
| Clint Stanaway | Stannas | Co-host & Newsreader | 2021–present | Previously was Weekend Today co-host and Nine News reporter and weekend sport presenter on the Nine Network. |
| Brodie Pummeroy | The Thumb | Executive Producer | 2024–present | Previously was a producer on Ben, Liam & Belle and Chrissie, Sam & Browny on Nova 100 and Ash London Live on Hit Network. |
| Jaz Keane | Jizz | Senior Producer | 2023, 2024–present | Previously was a panel operator on Up Late with Zach & Dom on KIIS Network and was a radio presenter on SPIN 1038 in Dublin, Ireland. |
| Alison Munro | Gen Z | Producer | 2024–present | The youngest member of the team, often missing references quoted by Hawkins/Phillips and their generation. |
| Ben French | Moby | Audio Producer | 2023, 2024–present | Previously worked on The Night Show on KIIS Network. |
| Macey Gibbs | Mace Dog | Audience Engagement | 2024–present | Previously worked on Ben, Liam & Belle. Former AFL footy player Bryce Gibbs sister. |
| Mitchell O'Shea | Mitchy | Technology Engineer | 2024–present | Assisted with the Hide & Seek competition. |
| Brendan Taylor | BT | NOVA Group Programming Director | 2024–present | The big boss. |
| Lachlan Millsom | Slipknot/Slippy | Digital Content Producer | 2025–present | Previously co-starred in a short comedy film at Cannes |
| Keeley | Touchy Feeley Keeley (TFK) | Senior Project Manager | 2025–present | |
On Air Guests
| Harry McKay | | Contributor | 2025–present | AFL contributor |
| Nick Watson | The Wizard | Contributor | 2025–present | AFL contributor |
| Christine Ahern | | Guest Co-host | 2026–present | Friend of the show and guest co-host during Clint Stanaway's parental leave (November 2026). |
Podcast Guests
| Paul O'Brien | The Unit | | 2021–present | Lauren's fiancé, occasionally heard on the podcast. Aviation charter specialist. |
| Sarah McGilvray | | Program Director - Network Shows | 2024–present | |

=== Past team members ===
| Name | Nickname | Role | Years | Notes |
|---|---|---|---|---|
| Caitlin McArthur | Sk8lin | Executive Producer | 2021 | Previously a senior producer with Carrie & Tommy. |
| Jane Mackinlay | The Narc | Creative Producer | 2019–2022, 2024 | Talent booker and an alleged spy for HR. Temporarily returned when show moved to Nova 100. |
| Samuel McGinn | Regional Sam | Producer | 2020–2022 | Previously known as "Hot Guy" and was a breakfast presenter at hit93.1 Riverina. |
| Dean Milhe | Dean van Dyke (DVD) | Video Producer | 2021–2022 | Has 126k subscribers on his YouTube channel Twistie3. |
| Amanda (Mandy) Catalano | Nonna | Audio Producer | 2021–2022 | Previously was a music announcer at Fox FM. Host of Inside the Group Chat podcast. |
| Tony Aldridge | Chatty Tony/Teabags | KIIS 101.1 Content Director | 2021–2022 | Occasional guest on the podcast. Known for his catchphrase 'Sweetheart, you got a second'. Loves a chat and a chart. Moved to Sydney KIIS 106.5 in company restructure. |
| Luke James | Manchild | Executive Producer | 2022 | Previously was a producer on The Kyle and Jackie O Show on KIIS 106.5 and senior producer on Fitzy & Wippa on Nova 96.9. Departed December 2022. |
| Jonathan Skewes | Scudda/Scatman | Audio Producer | 2021–2022, 2024 | Previously was a breakfast presenter at Magic 93.1 and was on the production team for Jase & PJ. Temporarily returned when show moved to Nova 100. |
| Mikayla White | Crazy Dog Lady/Celeste/Thirsty Mik | Senior Producer | 2022–2023 | Previously was a producer on Molloy and The Danny Lakey Show on Triple M. |
| Jack Erickson | Lumberjack | Video/Media Producer | 2022–2023 | Previously was a weekend breakfast host, voice over artist and digital content producer at Fresh 92.7 in Adelaide. |
| Ben McDowell | Bin Chicken/Ted | Producer | 2022–2023 | Previously was a producer on Bree and Clint on ZM. Announced his departure from radio to work at a golf course. Returned to radio in October 2024 to become Executive Producer of Ben, Liam & Belle. |
| Alice James | Sharon/Greg | Executive Producer | 2023 | Previously an executive producer on Roo and Ditts on Triple M Adelaide. Daughter of radio broadcaster Darren James. |
| Adrian Brine | AB | KIIS 101.1 Content Director | 2022–2023 | Previously held a number of roles at Southern Cross Austereo. Married to radio personality Ash London. |
| Quentin Alchin-Smith | Tarantino | Digital Content Producer | 2023 | Practically a mute. |
| Whitney Plowman | Whitney | Temporary Producer | 2024 | Can make a good hot cross bun. |
| Cameron D’Antone | Franco | Digital Content Producer | 2024 | Assisted with the $250,000 Hide & Seek competition in June 2024. Previously on Jase and PJ on KIIS 101.1. |
| Perri Cassie | Nandos | Senior Digital Content Producer | 2024–2025 | Previously worked on The Christian O'Connell Show at Gold 104.3. Prior to 2020 he had a successful career as a stand-up comedian. |
| Nathan Ryan | Nate | Head of Audience Engagement, Promotions & Branded Content | 2025–2026 | A marathon runner in his spare time. |

=== Past regular guests ===
| Name | Nickname | Role | Years | Notes |
|---|---|---|---|---|
| Christian Petracca | Trac | Contributor | 2021–2024 | AFL contributor |
| Mason Cox | Coxy | Contributor | 2022–2024 | AFL contributor. In February 2025, Cox announced he would not be returning to the show for the upcoming AFL season. |
| Nazeem Hussain | Naz | Contributor | 2021 | |
