= Ben & Liam =

Australian breakfast radio show

- Genre: Comedy
- Running time: 120 minutes
- Country of origin: Australia
- Language: English
- Home station: KIIS 102.3
- Hosted by: Ben Harvey and Liam Stapleton
- Starring: Ben Harvey and Liam Stapleton
- Executive producer: Belle Jackson
- Original release: 6 January 2020 – 24 October 2025
- No. of series: 1 (KIIS 102.3) 1 (Nova FM), 1 (Nova 100), 1 (Nova 919), 3 (triple j),
- Audio format: Stereo
- Podcast

Ben & Liam is an Australian radio show on KIIS 102.3 in Adelaide. It is hosted by comedians Ben Harvey and Liam Stapleton.

The show airs from 6am to 10am on weekdays with music and daily topic discussions and special guests.

== History ==
=== Fresh 92.7 ===
Ben Harvey and Liam Stapleton commenced their radio career at Adelaide community radio station, Fresh 92.7 where they hosted breakfast.

=== Triple J ===
In late 2016, Harvey and Stapleton were confirmed to take over from Matt Okine and Alex Dyson as co-hosts of the nationwide Triple J Breakfast show in January 2017.

In October 2019, it was announced that Ben and Liam will leave Triple J after three years at the station to return to Adelaide.

=== Nova FM ===
In January 2020, Nova Entertainment announced that Stapleton and Harvey will join Nova 91.9 to host breakfast. The show commenced broadcasting on 6 January 2020 on Nova 91.9

In December 2021, Ben and Liam hosted Summer Breakfast across the Nova Network.

In January 2023, the show moved to Nova 100 in Melbourne with producer Belle Jackson joining them and the show was renamed Ben, Liam & Belle.

In February 2024, Nova Entertainment announced that Jase & Lauren will host Nova 100’s new Melbourne breakfast show, replacing Ben, Liam & Belle who will move to a national drive show across the Nova Network. Their first late drive show aired on 11 March 2024.

In October 2024, Ben McDowell was named as Executive Producer of the show.

In May 2025, it was announced that Ben, Liam & Belle would return to Adelaide to host the show. Executive Producer Ben McDowell elected to depart the show and not join the team in Adelaide. In July 2025, Molly Rose was appointed as Executive Producer.

In September 2025, Nova Entertainment announced that Ben, Liam and Belle would end their radio program and leave the network at the end of the year. Originally slated to end on Friday, 12 December, it was later announced that Ben, Liam, and Belle would be departing with immediate effect, with their final show airing on Friday, 24 October.

=== KIIS 102.3 ===
In October 2025, ARN Media announced that Mix 102.3 will be rebranded to KIIS 102.3 with Ben and Liam to host breakfast in 2026. Belle Jackson will remain with the show as a producer.

In January 2026, it was reported that Ben & Liam's start on KIIS 102.3 would be delayed until 1 April 2026, due to a non compete clause in their NOVA contracts.
