= Sunday Night Safran =

- Running time: 2 hours (with music and promotions)
- Country of origin: Australia
- Language: English
- Home station: Triple J
- Hosted by: John Safran; Bob Maguire
- Original release: 2005 – 2015
- Website: abc.net.au/triplej/safran

Sunday Night Safran was a weekly radio program on Australian youth radio station, Triple J, about "religion, politics and all things ethnic." It was hosted by John Safran and Catholic priest, Bob Maguire. It ran from 2005 to 2015.

During the program's run, Safran and Fr Maguire were able to get interviews from people such as:

- religious scholar Reza Aslan
- Julian Assange's mother Christine
- The Exorcist star Linda Blair
- Pulitzer Prize winning journalist Katherine Boo
- philosopher and School of Life founder Alain de Botton
- retired prison doctor and psychiatrist Theodore Dalrymple
- longest-serving Australian Foreign Minister Alexander Downer
- West Memphis Three Damien Echols
- detained Al Jazeera journalist Peter Greste
- antitheist Christopher Hitchens
- Dame Edna
- Barry Humphries
- conspiracy theorist David Icke
- television evangelist and exorcist Bob Larson
- Serbian political activist Srđa Popović
- former white supremacist skinhead Frank Meeink
- pro-euthanasia doctor Philip Nitschke
- The Act of Killing director Joshua Oppenheimer
- journalist and writer Jon Ronson
- true crime writer and Ted Bundy co-worker Ann Rule
- Australian Race Discrimination Commissioner Tim Soutphommasane
- the Lizardman Erik Sprague
- African-American pro-Israel political activist and Zionist Chloé Valdary
- Jewish activist against child sexual abuse Manny Waks
- psychic Lisa Williams
- American parodist "Weird Al" Yankovic
