= Stuart Matchett =

Australian radio announcer and program director

Stuart Matchett (29 June 1950 – 2 April 2018) was an Australian radio announcer and program director.

He started in radio at Brisbane community station 4ZZZ-FM in 1975. He was a presenter at Triple J from 1978 to 1986 (nights and mornings) and for several years in this period he hosted a weekly "Almanac" program, broadcast on Sundays, which looked at the history of postwar popular music and pop culture. From 1989 to 2002 he was the Triple J program director with periods as acting general manager. From 2002 until his initial retirement in 2009 he was the program director at the ABC's DIG internet radio.

He was married to writer Angela Webber (who died of cancer in March 2007). They have two daughters Lily Matchett and Sally Matchett.

He was married to teacher and rower, Angela Conry in 2012.

Matchett died on 2 April 2018 after succumbing to colo-rectal cancer.
