= Roots 'n All =

Roots 'n All is the blues and roots music program on national Australian youth broadcaster Triple J. It is broadcast on Monday nights between 10 p.m. and 1 a.m. It started out as a 2-hour program starting at 11pm, but since 2006 has been expanded into a 3-hour show starting at 10pm.

Roots 'n All reflects the contemporary roots music scene worldwide. The show features local and overseas musicians from genres as diverse as Blues, Folk, Jazz, Country, Soul, Reggae and World.

Roots 'n All began hosted by Jordie Kilby began as a replacement for popular program The J Files in 2004. Jordie then left to go overseas in 2005, so Australian songwriter and guitarist Jeff Lang temporarily hosted.

In late 2005 blues musician Ash Grunwald took over hosting duties. In events that Ash Grunwald had gigs that affected presenting Roots 'n All, Sarah Howells was his regular replacement. On 21 December 2006 Ash presented his last show of Roots 'n All and finished his role as a Triple J presenter.

Roots 'n All returned on 11 January 2007, with Sarah Howells as the permanent presenter.

In 2013, Roots 'n All moved from Thursday nights to Monday nights.

In November 2016 it was announced that Sarah Howells would leave the show, passing hosting duties to Nkechi Anele. Howells now hosts Stir it Up on Double J.
