= Robbie Buck =

Australian radio announcer

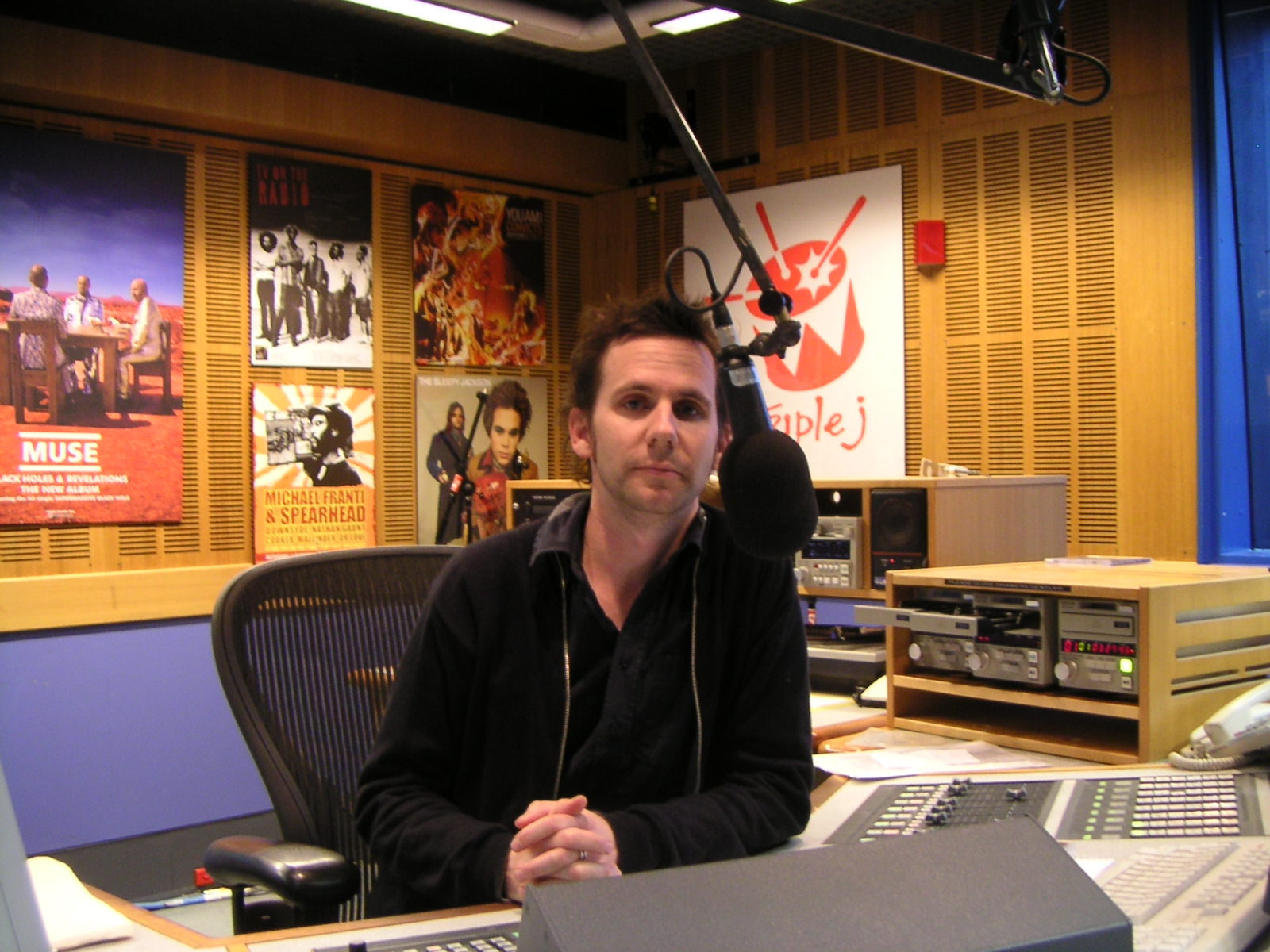
- Robbie in the Triple J studio
- Born: March 24, 1972 (age 54); Lismore, New South Wales, Australia
- Occupations: Radio host, National Buck Ambassador

Robert Buck known as Robbie Buck is an Australian radio announcer.

== Career ==
Robbie's radio experience began in his home town of Lismore where he took up a late night shift on the local radio station. Once he moved to Sydney he began doing graveyard shifts on community station 2SER, and eventually became a full-time employee for the station. Following this, he spent time at SBS radio and TV as a sound producer. During his time at SBS, he co-hosted Alchemy which was a late night TV program focused on the electronic music scene.

In 2003, he took on the role of a new show at the Australian Broadcasting Corporation's Triple J, Home and Hosed, the successor to Richard Kingsmill's Australian Music Show. The new program aired every weeknight from 9 pm for two hours, replacing the single three-hour timeslot that Kingsmill's show had taken. The show cemented the station's tradition of being a strong supporter of Australian music at a time when the station was going through turmoil in management changes.

In 2006, Caroline Tran took the reins of Home and Hosed, and Robbie started a new program Top Shelf Radio, airing in the afternoon drive timeslot from 3 – 5:30 pm. He remained the host of the program until the end of the 2007 ratings period, to make way for Dools and Linda in 2008, hosted by Scott Dooley and Linda Marigliano. Robbie subsequently joined Lindsay McDougall and Marieke Hardy to host the new breakfast show, Robbie, Marieke and The Doctor. During his time at Triple J, Robbie also hosted the Lunch and Weekend Lunch shows, and has appeared on ABC TV programs including Mondo Thingo hosted by Amanda Keller.

In September 2009, Robbie announced that he would be leaving Triple J to host the Evenings program on 702 ABC Sydney, 1233 ABC Newcastle, 666 ABC Canberra and ABC Local Radio stations across New South Wales. In 2012 he was replaced by Dominic Knight and moved on to host The Inside Sleeve on Radio National until the end of the 2013 ratings year. Buck returned to 702 ABC Sydney in 2014 when he replaced Adam Spencer as host of Breakfast 5:30 – 8 am weekdays. On 1 October 2021, Robbie announced via ABC news that he was leaving his ABC Radio Sydney breakfast show that he co-hosted with Wendy Harmer for three years, stating they had decided to "go out on a high".
