= Luka Muller =

Australian comedian and radio presenter

- Born: November 4, 1993 (age 32)
- Occupations: Radio presenter; comedian
- Years active: 2013-present
- Notable work: Triple J Breakfast
- Website: www.lukacmuller.com

Luka Cameron Muller (born 4 November 1993) is an Australian comedian and radio presenter. His comedy is noted for its light-hearted friendliness and easygoing storytelling. Muller has performed across the world in places such as Melbourne, London, Berlin, and Singapore, and at festivals like the Edinburgh Fringe Festival and Splendour In The Grass. He is best known for co-hosting the Triple J Breakfast radio show with Concetta Caristo since July 2024.

== Early life ==
Muller is from the town of Echuca in Victoria, Australia, where he attended Moama Anglican Grammar School. Growing up, his first introduction to Triple J was Sunday Night Safran. During year 12 he worked at Woolworths, and later worked in bottle shops, retail, and as a removalist while pursuing comedy.

== Career ==
Muller was introduced to performing comedy through the Melbourne International Comedy Festival's Class Clowns initiative, where he performed his first comedy gig at age 17, and made it through several rounds of the competition. In 2013, he moved to Melbourne to pursue comedy. There, he appeared on C31 shows Live on Bowen and About Tonight.

In 2018, Muller began co-hosting a comedy horror podcast called Oooh, Spooky with Adam Knox and Peter Jones. In 2020, he began another podcast, Going Hypo, with Alex Ward, about comedic hypotheticals. In 2021, Muller and Ward released the final Going Hypo episode, and together they began a new podcast called Nay Yay the following year.

Muller began working at Triple J radio in 2022, and began hosting graveyard shifts and guesting on other shows. In early 2024, Muller began hosting Triple J's Weekend Arvos show with fellow comedian Jordan Barr. In July of that year, he moved to Sydney to co-host Triple J's Breakfast show alongside Concetta Caristo.

Also in 2024, Muller released his first filmed stand-up special via YouTube, titled "Top 5 Smells I Smelled Before". In the special, Muller distributes scratch-and-sniff cards with scents relating to the stories he tells. He also recounts the story of his involvement in Michael Hing's proposal to Humyara Mahbub, a series of events which Hing told from his own perspective in his comedy special, "Long Live The Hing".

== Personal life ==
Muller is asexual, and has discussed this aspect of his identity in his stand-up.

He has deuteranopia, a form of red-green colourblindness.

== Works ==
=== Podcasts ===
- Oooh, Spooky (2018–2025)
- Going Hypo (2020-2021)
- Nay Yay (2022)

=== Live Shows ===
- Be Like Water (2016)
- Lucky (2017)
- Haha Cool (2019)
- Old/New/Other (2021)
- Yeah Nice (2022)
- Five Top Smells I Smelled Before (2024)
