= Concetta Caristo =

Australian radio presenter and comedian

- Born: 1994 or 1995 (age 31–32); Sydney, Australia
- Occupations: Radio presenter; comedian
- Years active: 2019–present
- Notable work: Triple J Breakfast

Concetta Caristo (/kənˈtʃɛtə/ kən-CHET-uh) is an Australian radio presenter and comedian. She is best known for co-hosting the Triple J radio show Breakfast from December 2022 to June 2026. She also has appeared on television, including the third season of Taskmaster Australia and I'm a Celebrity Australia 2026.

== Career ==
Caristo began performing comedy in 2019. The same year, she co-wrote (with Hannah Pembroke) and starred in the one-woman play Loose, an autobiographical "blend of stand-up, storytelling and theatre" about Caristo's family escaping from her abusive father and moving to Perth. The show was her debut at The Sydney Fringe. Other shows Caristo has performed in include Big Natural Talents and Funny As Sin.

She began co-hosting the morning radio show Triple J Breakfast in December 2022. After announcing her departure from Triple J in April 2026, Caristo stepped down from radio on 26 June 2026.

On television, Caristo has appeared on Celebrity Letters and Numbers, The Cheap Seats, and Question Everything. She appeared on the third season of Taskmaster Australia, in addition to Guy Montgomery's Guy Mont-Spelling Bee.

Caristo received a Moosehead Award at the Melbourne International Comedy Festival in 2023.

In 2026, Caristo won the twelfth season of Network 10's I'm a Celebrity...Get Me Out of Here! while competing for Full Stop Australia, a charity which aims to support those affected by domestic violence.

== Personal life ==
She is of Italian parentage. After choosing to support Full Stop Australia on I'm a Celebrity, Caristo revealed that the charity had helped her, her mother, and her sister escape an abusive household when she was a teenager.
