= Frenzal Rhomb discography =

The discography of Frenzal Rhomb consists of ten studio albums, two compilation albums, one demo album and one EP.

== Albums ==
=== Studio albums ===
Year	Title	Peak chart position		Certification
Year	Title	AUS	US CMJ	Certification
1995	Coughing Up a Storm: Label: Belly of the Buddha; Format: CD	—	—	
1996	Not So Tough Now: Label: Shagpile / Shock; Format: CD	34	—	ARIA: Gold
1997	Meet the Family: Label: Shagpile / Shock; Format: CD	39	—	ARIA: Gold
1999	A Man's Not a Camel: Label: Shagpile / Shock / Fat; Format: CD, LP	11	144	ARIA: Gold
2000	Shut Your Mouth: Label: Epic/Sony (later Fat/Shock); Format: CD, LP	31	174	
2003	Sans Souci: Label: Fat/Shock; Format: CD	42	—	
2006	Forever Malcolm Young: Label: Epitaph/Fat Wreck Chords/Shock; Format: CD	34	—	
2011	Smoko at the Pet Food Factory: Label: Fat Wreck Chords/Shock; Format: CD	14	—	
2017	Hi-Vis High Tea: Label: Fat Wreck Chords; Format: CD, LP, digital download	9	—	
2023	The Cup of Pestilence: Label: Fat Wreck Chords; Format: CD, LP, digital download	12	—	
"—" denotes releases that did not chart.

=== Compilation albums ===
Year	Title	Peak chart position
Year	Title	AUS
2004	For the Terms of Their Unnatural Lives: Label: HMPIFPFT Records / Epitaph / Shock; Format: CD	—
2016	We Lived Like Kings (We Did Anything We Wanted): Label: Universal Music; Format: CD, digital download	58

== EPs ==
List of EPs, with selected details
Title	Details
Dick Sandwich	Released: 1993; Format: CD; Label: Spent Music

== Singles ==
List of singles, with selected chart positions
Title	Year	Peak chart positions	Album
Title	Year	AUS	Album
"Sorry About the Ruse"	1994	—	Non-album single
"4 Litres"	1995	—	Coughing Up a Storm
"Parasite"	1996	—	Not So Tough Now
"Punch in the Face"	1996	—	Not So Tough Now
"Disappointment"	1996	—	Not So Tough Now
"There's Your Dad"	1997	—	Meet the Family
"Mr. Charisma"	1997	—	Meet the Family
"Mum Changed the Locks"	1998	90	Meet the Family
"Some of My Best Friends Are Racist"	1998	—	Meet the Family
"We're Going Out Tonight"	1999	100	A Man's Not a Camel
"You Are Not My Friend"	1999	49	A Man's Not a Camel
"Never Had So Much Fun"	1999	—	A Man's Not a Camel
"I Miss My Lung"	1999	—	A Man's Not a Camel
"War"	2000	52	Shut Your Mouth
"Coming Home"	2001	—	Shut Your Mouth
"Nothing's Wrong"	2001	—	Shut Your Mouth
"Bucket Bong"	2002	—	Sans Souci
"Russell Crowes Band"	2003	—	Sans Souci
"Punisher"	2003	—	Sans Souci
