= We Lived Like Kings (We Did Anything We Wanted) =

Greatest hits album by Frenzal Rhomb
- Released: 19 August 2016 (Australia)
- Genre: Pop punk; punk rock; skate punk; melodic hardcore
- Length: 1:11:59
- Label: Universal Music

Frenzal Rhomb chronology
Smoko at the Pet Food Factory (2011)	We Lived Like Kings (We Did Anything We Wanted) (2016)	Hi-Vis High Tea (2017)

We Lived Like Kings (We Did Anything We Wanted) is a 2016 best of album by the Australian punk band Frenzal Rhomb. It was announced on 14 July 2016 on their Facebook page, and released on 19 August 2016.

== Track listing ==
No.	Title	Length
1.	"Russell Crowe's Band" (from Sans Souci, 2003)	1:13
2.	"Never Had So Much Fun" (from A Man's Not a Camel, 1999)	1:58
3.	"Mum Changed the Locks" (from Meet the Family, 1997)	1:56
4.	"We're Going Out Tonight" (from A Man's Not a Camel, 1997)	2:15
5.	"Punch in the Face" (from Not So Tough Now, 1996)	1:44
6.	"Bucket Bong" (from Sans Souci, 2003)	2:32
7.	"I Miss My Lung" (from A Man's Not a Camel, 1999)	3:25
8.	"5000 Cigarettes" (from Smoko at the Pet Food Factory, 2011)	1:41
9.	"Bird Attack" (from Smoko at the Pet Food Factory, 2011)	1:14
10.	"Let's Drink a Beer" (from A Man's Not a Camel, 1999)	3:13
11.	"White World" (from Sans Souci, 2003)	2:01
12.	"Forever Malcolm Young" (from Forever Malcolm Young, 2006)	1:27
13.	"Johnny Ramone was in a Fucken Good Band But He was a Cunt (Gabba Gabba You Suck)" (from Forever Malcolm Young, 2006)	0:31
14.	"Ship of Beers" (from Meet the Family, 1997)	2:15
15.	"When My Baby Smiles at Me I Go to Rehab" (from Smoko at the Pet Food Factory, 2011)	1:04
16.	"Coming Home" (from Shut Your Mouth, 2001)	2:30
17.	"Ballchef" (from Sans Souci, 2003)	1:18
18.	"Home and Away" (from Dick Sandwich, 1994)	1:05
19.	"You Are Not My Friend" (from A Man's Not a Camel, 1999)	3:23
20.	"Mummy Doesn't Know You're a Nazi" (from Smoko at the Pet Food Factory, 2011)	1:25
21.	"Worlds Fuckedest Cunt" (from Sans Souci, 2003)	2:30
22.	"Genius" (from Coughing Up a Storm, 1995)	2:58
23.	"4 Litres" (from Coughing Up a Storm, 1995)	2:08
24.	"Richer Than You" (from Dick Sandwich, 1994)	2:12
25.	"Fuck the System" (from Sorry For the Ruse, 1994)	1:48
26.	"Cones" (from Coughing Up a Storm, 1995)	2:51
27.	"You Can't Move Into My House" (from Meet the Family, 1997)	2:26
28.	"Uncle Ken" (from Not So Tough Now, 1996)	2:07
29.	"Pants" (from Not So Tough Now, 1996)	0:59
30.	"You Are a Knob" (from Not So Tough Now, 1996)	2:42
31.	"Gambling, Vomit, Sleeping in the Bin" (from For the Term of Their Unnatural Lives, 2004)	2:48
32.	"Urban Myth" (from Not So Tough Now, 1996)	1:40
33.	"Alvarez" (from Smoko at the Pet Food Factory, 2011)	1:48
34.	"Kaan Kunt" (from Coughing Up a Storm, 1995)	2:15
35.	"The Best of Secret Track" (from Not So Tough Now, 1996)	2:37

== Charts ==
Chart (2016)	Peak position
Australian Albums (ARIA)	58
