= Batfoot =

Australian punk rock band

- Origin: Sydney, Australia
- Genres: Punk rock, pop punk
- Years active: 2008–present
- Labels: SP Records, Bloated Kat Records, Atomic Brain Records
- Members: Craig Hughes; Justin McLoughlin; Jimmy Campbell; Lucas Woods
- Website: batfoot.com

Batfoot, stylized as Batfoot!, is a punk and pop punk band from Sydney, Australia. The band was formed in 2008 and consists of members Craig Hughes, Justin McLoughlin, Jimmy Campbell, and Lucas Woods. The band is heavily influenced by punk rock acts Teenage Bottlerocket, Screeching Weasel, The Queers, and Chixdiggit, as well as Ramones; The band has described many of their records as "ramonescore".

Batfoot has played and performed with bands such as Teenage Bottlerocket, The Tenants, No Fun At All, The Flatliners, Strike Anywhere, Magic Dirt, Rehab For Quitters, Guttermouth, The Dickies, Adolescents, Toe To Toe, MxPx, Frenzal Rhomb, Nancy Vandal, Me First and the Gimme Gimmes, CJ Ramone and Hard-Ons, and performed at Gingerfest in Canberra, Australia in 2016. The band has received attention from Australian national radio station Triple J, and in 2017, Rest Assured (the website for the discontinued print fanzine of the same name) described Batfoot as "the kings of Australian leather clad punk rock".

== History ==
=== Melodic Tardcore and Utsukushii (2009–2010) ===
Batfoot self-released their eight-track debut EP, Melodic Tardcore (a play on melodic hardcore), in early 2009. (The EP is since available through independent record label It's Alive Records.) Later in the year, the band released a cover of the Nancy Vandal song "We're Not Getting Any Nuder" for "Vandals Voice", a Nancy Vandal tribute CD/DVD. In 2010, the band followed up their debut release with their second EP, Utsukushii, which was released on and sold through Japanese independent record label SP Records. Ben Weasel, lead singer of Screeching Weasel and member of Riverdales, completed the sequencing on Melodic Tardcore and Utsukushii.

After the release of Melodic Tardcore, Australian radio station Triple J played tracks from the EP on the station's Short Fast Loud show. Radio announcer Stu Harvey praised the band's music, writing "Simple fast melodic punk rock played in the vein of The Ramones and Screeching Weasel, love it! Batfoot! is the best thing I've heard on Unearthed in 2009."

=== Brain Dead (2011–2013) ===
In September 2011, SP Records announced on their website that Batfoot had signed to them for the release of a full-length album; The band later announced this on their website and via Twitter. The album, Brain Dead, was released on 1 March 2012. Brandon Carlisle, late drummer of Teenage Bottlerocket, completed the sequencing for the album at 301Studios, and Mike Foxall of Nancy Vandal designed the album artwork. The album was recorded, produced, and mixed by Ryan Hazell at Ivory Lane Studios, and mastered by Ben Feggans at 301Studios.

In 2013, the band stated that they were "currently gearing up for LP number two due for release in the second half of 2014."

=== Punk Rock Christmas, Cut the Cord and Skate or Fly (2013–present) ===
In 2015, Batfoot recorded a version of the Mariah Carey song "All I Want For Christmas Is You" for the album Punk Rock Christmas, released by Cleopatra Records.

In May 2016, Bloated Kat Records, home to artists such as Mikey Erg, Lipstick Homicide, and House Boat, announced that they had signed Batfoot or an upcoming full-length release; Atomic Brain Records also announced the signing for an Australian release of a new album. The album, Cut the Cord, was released on 17 June 2016 and available on CD and vinyl format; Bloated Kat Records released the album in the United States, Europe, and Asia, and Atomic Brain Records released the album in Australia and New Zealand. All tracks on the album were recorded by Michael Ferfoglia (who also produced, engineered, and mixed the album) at Redman Studios in Newcastle, New South Wales, Australia, and the drums were tracked at The Studio, also located in Newcastle. The album was mastered by Jason Livermore at The Blasting Room in Fort Collins, Colorado, USA. The record's artwork and layout were designed by Fox Trotsky. All tracks were written by Batfoot except for "Dance in Chicago", which was originally written by punk rock band Mach Pelican.

In June 2016, shortly after the release of Cut the Cord, Batfoot recorded a version of the Teenage Bottlerocket song "Repeat Offender" at the Redman Studios. The track, mastered by Jason Livermore at The Blasting Room, was released on a tribute album, Skate or Fly, dedicated to Brandon Carlisle, late drummer of Teenage Bottlerocket, who died on 7 November 2015. Skate or Fly was released on 23 December 2016, through RTTB Records.

== Members ==
- Craig Hughes – Bass/Vocals
- Justin McLoughlin – Guitar/Vocals
- Jimmy Campbell – Drums
- Lucas (The King) Woods – Guitar/Vocals

== Discography ==
=== Studio albums ===
- Brain Dead (2012)
- Cut the Cord (2016)

=== EPs ===
- Melodic Tardcore (2009)
- Utsukushii (2009)

=== Compilations (featured on) ===
- Vandals Voice (2009)
- Punk Rock Christmas (2015)
- Skate or Fly (2016)
