= Snowtown murders =

Series of murders in Adelaide, South Australia

- Motive: Homophobia; Financial gain Hatred of paedophiles Fatphobia; Hatred of drug addicts Transphobia
- Criminal charge: Murder (12 counts)
- Penalty: Bunting: 11 life sentences without parole Wagner: 10 life sentences without parole Vlassakis: four life sentences with 26 year non-parole period Haydon: 25 years with 18 year non-parole period

Details
- Victims: 12
- Span of crimes: August 1992 – May 1999
- Country: Australia
- State: South Australia
- Date apprehended: 21 May 1999

The Snowtown murders (also known as the bodies in barrels murders) were a series of murders committed by John Justin Bunting, Robert Joe Wagner, and James Spyridon Vlassakis between August 1992 and May 1999, in and around Adelaide, South Australia. A fourth person, Mark Haydon, was convicted of helping to dispose of the bodies. The trial was one of the longest and most publicised in Australian legal history.

Most of the bodies were found in barrels in an abandoned bank vault in Snowtown, South Australia, hence the names given in the press for the murders. Only one of the victims was killed in Snowtown, which is approximately 140 kilometres (87 miles) north of Adelaide, and neither the twelve victims nor the three perpetrators were from the town. Although the motivation for the murders is unclear, the killers were led by Bunting to believe that the victims were paedophiles, homosexuals or "weak". In the case of some victims, the murders were preceded by torture, and efforts were made to appropriate victims' identities, social security payments and bank accounts.

Although initially the notoriety of the murders led to a short-term economic boost from tourists visiting Snowtown, it created a stigma, with authorities considering a change of the town's name and identity. The case has been chronicled in numerous books as well as a film adaptation released in 2011 to critical acclaim.

== Background ==
=== Perpetrators ===
Several individuals were involved in the murders (Bunting, Wagner, and Haydon were all charged with the killings; additionally, Vlassakis pleaded guilty to four murders and provided testimony in exchange for a lesser sentence). There were several other persons who had acted as accomplices in the murders or in the disposal of the bodies:

- John Justin Bunting (born 4 September 1966) was found to be the leader of the perpetrators. When he was 8 years old, Bunting was beaten and sexually assaulted by a friend's older brother. He is reported to have "enjoyed weaponry, photography and anatomy," and grew to develop a strong hatred of paedophiles and homosexuals. At age 22, Bunting worked at an abattoir and reportedly "bragged about slaughtering the animals, saying that's what he enjoyed the most". Bunting moved to a house in Salisbury North in 1991 and befriended his neighbours Haydon and Wagner.
- Robert Joe Wagner (born 28 November 1971) was befriended by Bunting in 1991. Bunting encouraged Wagner to assist in the various murders. Like Bunting, Wagner was formerly active in several neo-Nazi groups.
- James Spyridon Vlassakis (born 24 December 1979), along with his mother and half-brother, lived with Bunting and was gradually drawn into helping with the murders. Vlassakis, 19, helped torture and kill his own half-brother, Troy Youde, and his stepbrother, David Johnson. He confessed in 2001 to four murders, including Johnson's, and became a key witness for the Crown. The detail he provided, supported by other evidence, helped convict Bunting and Wagner. Vlassakis was sentenced in 2002 to a minimum of 26 years and was held in isolation in an unidentified South Australia prison. In early August 2025, it was announced that Vlassakis would be granted parole, but this decision was overturned in a subsequent review. In September 2026, Vlassakis' original parole decision was confirmed when it was found that the attorney-general had failed to provide adequate reasons for the decision of the parole board to be overturned.
- Elizabeth Harvey, Vlassakis' mother, also knew about the murders, and with Bunting's encouragement, assisted in one of them. After Bunting, Wagner, Vlassakis, and Haydon were taken into custody, she died from cancer.
- Mark Ray Haydon (born 4 December 1958), an associate of Bunting, was initially the subject of "suppression orders or statutory provisions prohibiting publication" and could not therefore be identified as anything other than an alleged perpetrator. In January 1999, he reportedly rented the abandoned state bank building at Snowtown. A jury deadlocked on the murders of Haydon's wife, Elizabeth, and of Troy Youde. The murder charges were not retried when Haydon pleaded guilty to helping the killers dispose of the bodies of Elizabeth and Youde. Haydon was released from prison in May 2024.
- Jodie Elliott, the sister of Elizabeth, was a woman with below-average intelligence who had become besotted with Bunting. To receive her social security income, she pretended to be Suzanne Allen, a deceased former acquaintance of Bunting's. Frederick Brooks, Elliott's son, was later killed by the group.

== Murders ==
The victims were chosen by Bunting for imagined infractions; some victims were murdered as Bunting suspected them of being paedophiles, based on flimsy evidence or rumours. Others were killed due to his dislike of obese people, drug users, or because they were homosexual. Most of the victims were friends or acquaintances of at least one member of Bunting's group. Some were family members, occasionally sharing a residence with one of the murderers. Some were befriended for a short time and pulled into the group as easy targets for Bunting.

Kevin Howells, a forensic psychiatrist at Broadmoor Hospital in the United Kingdom, believed that Bunting's behaviour suggested he lacked emotion and the capacity to empathise with his victims. It showed that Bunting was a psychopathic killer who derived satisfaction from controlling his victims. Bunting's victims were forced to call Bunting; "God", "Master", "Chief Inspector" and "Lord Sir". During the murders, Bunting had fashioned a "rock spider wall" on a wall of a spare room in his house. The chart, created using paper notes and yarn, was an interconnected web of names of people Bunting alone suspected to be paedophiles or homosexuals. Bunting would select a name from the wall then call and threaten the person.

The victims' social security and bank details were often obtained so the murderers, or their associates, could impersonate the victims after their deaths and continue to collect their pensions or welfare. Although a total of A$97,200 was collected in this way, it is not believed that social security fraud was the main motive for the murders. The final murder of David Johnson was conducted in a Snowtown bank building after the barrels which contained the majority of the victim's remains had been moved there for storage.

=== Victims ===
- Clinton Douglas Trezise, 20, was bludgeoned to death with a shovel in Bunting's living room in Salisbury, South Australia after being invited inside for a social visit on 31 August 1992. Bunting accused Trezise of being a paedophile and referred to him in conversations after his murder as "Happy Pants". Trezise was found buried two years after his murder in a shallow grave on 16 August 1994, at Lower Light, South Australia. In 1997, Trezise was the subject of two episodes of the Australian television show Australia's Most Wanted. Bunting watched an episode of the show with Vlassakis and his mother and boasted, "That's my handiwork" and revealed to Vlassakis that he had murdered Trezise while living at Waterloo Corner Road in Salisbury, and that he disposed of Trezise's body in Lower Light with Wagner and Vanessa Lane's assistance.
- Ray Allan Peter Davies, 26, was an intellectually disabled man who in 1993 had a sexual relationship with Suzanne Allen, Bunting's ex-girlfriend. As Suzanne's grandsons alleged that Davies had made sexual approaches towards them, the relationship came to an end. However, they remained friends, and just before he vanished, Davies was residing in a caravan that was parked behind Suzanne's house. On 26 December 1995, Allen's daughter, Annette Cannon, observed Bunting and Allen cleaning out Davies' caravan. Bunting later admitted to Vlassakis that he had killed Davies on 25 December 1995. He recounted how Vlassakis's own mother and Bunting's wife, Elizabeth Harvey, had stabbed Davies in the leg, just before their mutual friend, Robert Wagner, strangled the man to unconsciousness with jumper cables. In court testimony, Vlassakis stated that, according to Bunting's story, Bunting and Wagner loaded Davies' unconscious body into the boot of a Holden Torana. They drove ninety minutes to a residence in the town of Bakara, South Australia. They then tossed Davies into a bathtub, and proceeded to bash him in the genitals with the end of a pole which resulted in his death. On 26 May 1999, the body of Davies was found in a grave filled in by Bunting and Wagner with bricks, soil and concrete on property previously occupied by Bunting in Salisbury, South Australia. Security cameras caught Bunting accessing Davies' account at multiple banks on several occasions between January and April 1999.
- Suzanne Allen, 47, was found buried at Bunting's house at Salisbury North on 23 May 1999, wrapped in eleven different plastic bags. Her death was concealed by Bunting and he continued to collect her pension, claiming a total of $17,000. Bunting claimed she had died of a heart attack although law enforcement suspect that she was murdered when her relationship with Bunting deteriorated. Murder charges regarding the death of Allen were eventually dropped by the prosecution due to lack of evidence and the perpetrators were tried but not found guilty as a result of a hung jury; her case was never tried again.
- Michelle Gardiner, 19, was a transgender woman who lived in the residence of Nicole Zuritta, a cousin of Wagner's wife. Gardiner presented as female and Bunting referred to her as "the biggest homo". Shortly before her disappearance in September 1997, Gardiner was playing with Wagner's children in her front yard. Gardiner grabbed one of the children and placed her hand over the child's mouth. Wagner saw the incident and became infuriated. Bunting and Wagner took Gardiner to Murray Bridge, South Australia where they strangled her in a shed, forcing her to stand up each time she collapsed. Wagner and Bunting then staged a robbery at Gardiner's home, stealing some of Zuritta's belongings and convincing her that Gardiner had stolen them in order to pay for a gender-affirming surgery. Gardiner's body was kept in a barrel in the shed until it was moved to the Snowtown bank vault before it was found on 20 May 1999. Her right ear was covered by a slip knot in a rope that was wrapped around her neck. Her left foot had been cut off so the drum's lid could be shut.
- Vanessa Lane, 42, was Wagner's ex-partner. Lane, a transgender woman, began a relationship with Wagner when the latter was 15 years old. They had been living together for eight years when Lane and Wagner met Bunting upon his move to Salisbury North. Bunting held an open disdain for Lane, who had previously been convicted of child sexual abuse, but nevertheless accepted Lane into his circle of friends because she kept him informed of the activities of local paedophiles. Wagner ended the relationship with Lane in 1996, after which Thomas Eugenio Trevilyan (next victim, see below), with whom Lane had a concurrent relationship, moved in with Lane in April 1997. According to Lane, the killing of Trezise left her traumatised. She told her mother and Bunting's ex-girlfriend about the incident, and when they questioned Bunting about Lane's statements, he confirmed they were accurate. Trevilyan also told Bunting that Lane had been sexually abusing him. On 17 October 1997, Bunting, Wagner and Trevilyan picked up Lane and on orders from Bunting, Lane called and verbally abused her mother, who could hear Trevilyan in the background prompting her with what to say. After telling her mother she was moving to Queensland and wanted nothing further to do with her, she hung up. They tortured Lane for information about her bank accounts, crushing her toe with pliers. Lane was then strangled to death. Bunting assumed control of Lane's vehicle and claimed her welfare payments. On 20 May 1999, Lane's dismembered body was found by police in a barrel in the bank vault in Snowtown, along with the body of Gardiner.
- Thomas Eugenio Trevilyan, Lane's last partner, 18, had paranoid schizophrenia which led him to believe that he was a soldier, so he always wore army fatigues. From April to October 1997, Trevilyan lived with Lane for a total of five months; he helped Bunting and Wagner kill her. On 4 November 1997, Wagner's girlfriend's son was playing with a dog when Trevilyan began chasing it in an attempt to kill the animal with his knife; he was stopped but that afternoon Bunting told others that Trevilyan had started to "go mental" and that he would be a liability to them. Trevilyan was then driven on 5 November to Kersbrook in the Adelaide Hills by Bunting and Wagner. He was made to lean against a box and had a noose put over his neck. Trevilyan was discovered hanging from a tree in Humbug Scrub the following day. Given his history of prior suicide attempts, the coroner determined Trevilyan had killed himself.
- Gavin Allan Porter, Vlassakis's friend, 29, had been diagnosed with schizophrenia, for which he had spent many years in mental institutions. Following the death of his mother he moved to Adelaide from Victoria in 1997 where he met Vlassakis and moved in with him. Both Vlassakis and Porter were heroin addicts. After Bunting, Elizabeth Harvey and her children, including Vlassakis, moved to Murray Bridge in late 1997, Porter also moved with them. Bunting referred to Porter as a "waste" who no longer deserved to live. Bunting was pricked by a used syringe Porter had left on the couch in his living room, and decided he should be the next victim. Porter was sleeping in his parked automobile on Bunting's property when Bunting and Wagner attacked him. When Porter awoke, he managed to stab Bunting in the hand with a screwdriver before being overpowered and strangled. Porter's body was displayed to Vlassakis before being put in a barrel for disposal. Porter's body was found on 20 May 1999.
- Troy Youde, 21, was the half-brother of Vlassakis. Vlassakis had earlier confided in Bunting that Youde had sexually abused him when he was aged 13. Bunting and Wagner woke Vlassakis while he was sleeping in his bed and told him they were going to kill Youde. They beat Youde while he was asleep in bed and then Vlassakis handcuffed him while the others tied him up. Then they dragged Youde out of bed and forced him into the bathroom, where they beat him once more and demanded his financial information. Bunting used pliers to crush Youde's toes as he coaxed him to repeat a string of numbers, words, and sentences that he had recorded. Youde was killed by being strangled. Bunting created messages from Youde and afterwards from subsequent victims to inform friends that they would be going away using the recordings. His body was found on 20 May 1999.
- Frederick Robert Brooks, 18, was the son of Jodie Elliott who was the sister of Haydon's wife. Elliot had moved to South Australia in late 1997 to be near her sister. Bunting became obsessed with the notion that Brooks was "touching up" young girls and repeatedly told others that something had to "happen" to him. In September 1998, Brooks was notified that he had been accepted into the Australian Air Force Cadets and was invited to join Bunting, Wagner and Vlassakis at a party. Vlassakis, Wagner and Bunting tortured Brooks in a bath tub and as with previous victims, he was handcuffed and thumbcuffed. They inserted lit cigarettes into his ears and his nostrils, and a lit sparkler was shoved up into his urethra. He was then made to speak into a recording device, divulging his banking information. A syringe was used to inject bleach into his testicles, which were wired to a Variac, sending electrical impulses through his body. His toes were crushed by a pliers before he choked to death on his gag. Brooks' body was found in a barrel in the Snowtown bank on 20 May 1999.
- Gary O'Dwyer, 29, was a neighbour of Bunting's and was both mentally and physically disabled. Bunting repeatedly called O'Dwyer a "fag". Bunting enlisted Vlassakis' assistance in October 1998 to learn pertinent details regarding O'Dwyer's financial situation and whether he had any family. O'Dwyer's income from disability benefits was regarded as a financial target. At the insistence of Bunting, Vlassakis arranged with O'Dwyer for "a couple of friends" (Bunting, Wagner and Vlassakis) to have a drink with O'Dwyer in Frances Street, Murray Bridge. Bunting set out to get O'Dwyer drunk and after approximately fifteen to twenty minutes, Wagner grabbed O'Dwyer around the throat and proceeded to torture O'Dwyer for several hours. O'Dwyer's body was taken to Haydons' home where it was placed in a barrel. On 20 May 1999, O'Dwyer's body was found in the Snowtown bank vault.
- Elizabeth Haydon, 37, was Mark Haydon's wife and Frederick Brooks's aunt. Bunting was informed by Haydon that he had informed his wife about the murders. Bunting detested Elizabeth and warned Vlassakis that she was an issue because she was aware of the killings. Wagner had similar feelings about Elizabeth, considering Haydon's wife to be "a whore" and "a low-life". On 21 November 1998, Bunting and Wagner arrived at her residence. Her husband and children had gone out for the night. Elizabeth was dragged to her bathroom, tortured, then killed. A rope was left around her neck, and a gag had been taped into her mouth. Purportedly, later that day, when her husband was shown her remains, he laughed. Elizabeth's body was placed in a barrel. On 20 May 1999, Haydon's body was found in the Snowtown bank vault.
- David Johnson, 24, was Vlassakis's stepbrother. Bunting did not like Johnson because he was fastidious with his cleanliness and appearance and Bunting frequently referred to him as a "yuppie" and a "faggot". Bunting began talking about "getting" Johnson and suggested that Vlassakis find a way to get him to the bank in Snowtown. On 9 May 1999, Vlassakis told Johnson that there was a computer for sale cheap in Snowtown and he agreed to go with Vlassakis to buy it. He was overpowered as soon as he entered the building. Johnson was the only victim who died in Snowtown and his body was found on 20 May 1999. A piece of flesh from Johnson was fried and eaten by Bunting and Wagner.

== Investigation ==
Initially, the body of Clinton Trezise was found at Lower Light in 1994, although no connection to Bunting was made at this time. Similarly, the death of Thomas Trevilyan in 1997 was initially treated as a suicide. It was police inquiries into Elizabeth Haydon's disappearance which eventually led them to Snowtown, and in May 1999, the remains of eight victims were found by the South Australian Police in six plastic barrels in a disused bank vault. For this reason, the murders were dubbed the "bodies in barrels murders".

It is believed that the bodies had been held in several locations in South Australia before being moved to Snowtown in 1999. Prosecutors believe that the killers moved the bodies after they became aware of the ongoing police investigation. Two more bodies were found buried in the backyard of Bunting's house in Adelaide. Police later arrested and charged Bunting, Wagner and Mark Haydon on 21 May 1999, for the murders. Vlassakis was arrested later, on 26 May 1999. At the time of the arrest, Vlassakis lived in Bunting's home.

== Trials and verdicts ==
The trial of Bunting and Wagner lasted almost twelve months, the longest in the history of South Australia. One juror withdrew in October 2002 due to the graphic details of the crime. In September 2003, Bunting was convicted of committing eleven murders and Wagner of ten, three of which he had confessed. Vlassakis pleaded guilty to four of the murders. In 2004, Haydon was convicted on five counts of assisting with the murders of which he admitted to two. The jury did not come to a decision on two murder charges against Haydon, and another charge of assisting murder, at which the senior prosecutor, Wendy Abraham, indicated that she would seek a retrial on those charges. The final count against Bunting and Wagner—that of murdering Allen—was dropped on 7 May 2007, when a jury had been unable to reach a verdict.

Justice Brian Ross Martin determined that Bunting was the ringleader, and sentenced him to 11 consecutive terms of life imprisonment without the possibility of release on parole. Wagner was sentenced to 10 consecutive terms under the same conditions, and at his sentencing, he stated from the dock: "Pedophiles were doing terrible things to children. The authorities didn't do anything about it. I decided to take action. I took that action. Thank you." Vlassakis was sentenced to four consecutive life sentences with a non-parole period of 26 years and Haydon was sentenced to 25 years with non-parole period of 18 years. More than 250 suppression orders prevented publication of the details of this case.

=== Post-trial ===
In early 2011, a judge lifted the remaining orders in response to a request by the producers of the film Snowtown, a dramatisation depicting the murders and the events leading up to them.

In February 2024, Haydon was granted parole, with authorities citing his "excellent" behaviour in prison. He was released in April and was residing at the Adelaide Pre-Release Centre in Northfield as part of the conditions for his parole. He left the Centre in May 2024.

In August 2025, Vlassakis was granted parole after 26 years in prison, but the decision was overturned in a subsequent review. In September 2026, it was ruled that Vlassakis will be released on parole.

== Aftermath ==
The notoriety of the murders has led to an economic boost from tourists visiting Snowtown, but created a lasting stigma. The Age reported in 2011 that Snowtown would be "forever stigmatised" due to its association with the murders. As the true crime genre has become popular, Snowtown has become increasingly well known.

Shortly after the discovery of the bodies in Snowtown, the community discussed changing the name to "Rosetown", but no further actions were taken. As of 2012, one shop in Snowtown was selling souvenirs of the murders "cashing in on Snowtown's unfortunate notoriety".

The house in Salisbury North where Bunting lived and buried two bodies was demolished by its owner, the South Australian Housing Trust. The other place in Murray Bridge has been sold. The bank, with a four-bedroom attached house, was placed on auction in February 2012 but only reached half its reserve price of $200,000. After holding an open house which raised $700 for charity through charging an entrance fee, the property sold later that year on 27 September for just over $185,000 with the new owners intending to live in the house while running a business from the bank. A plaque was installed to commemorate the victims.

== In media ==
=== Film ===
Snowtown, also known as The Snowtown Murders, a feature film based upon the murders, was released in Australia on 19 May 2011.

=== Television ===
- Crimes That Shook Australia – Series 3 Episode 01: "Snowtown: The Bodies in the Barrels Murders" – 18 February 2018.
- Crime Investigation Australia – Series 1 Episode 09: "Snowtown: Bodies in the Barrels" – 2005.

=== Music ===
Australian comedian Eddie Perfect wrote a demo song for "Snowtown the Musical" intended to be screened at the 2011 Inside Film Awards that he was hosting. The song was not broadcast.

Jason Whalley and Lindsay McDougall of punk band Frenzal Rhomb formed a short lived acoustic band named Self Righteous Brothers, releasing an album in 2005 containing the song 'There's No Town Like Snowtown'.

=== Documentaries ===
- City of Evil – Series 1 Episode 02 – 16 September 2018.

=== Podcasts ===
- Casefile True Crime Podcast – "Case 19: Snowtown" – 14 May 2016.
- The Last Podcast on the Left – Episodes 570–572: The SnowTown Murders, Part I–III – 20 April to 11 May 2024.

== See also ==
- Gay bashing
- List of incidents of cannibalism
- List of serial killers by country
- Murders of Karlie Pearce-Stevenson and Khandalyce Pearce
- Social cleansing
