= The Drugs =

Australian alternative rock/concept band

- Origin: Sydney, New South Wales, Australia
- Genres: Alternative rock; punk rock
- Years active: 1998–2005; 2008–2009
- Labels: Rubber; Shock
- Past members: Ian Baddley; Benny Drill; David Live; Harry Snow; Mark Tracks; Tyler Noll
- Website: thedrugs.net.au

The Drugs were a five-piece Australian alternative rock/concept band. Formed in 1998 by Matt Downey (Ian Baddley) on lead vocals and keyboards; Downey had developed the idea while playing and touring in bands such as Drop City, IntrOverse, BILL and Mr Blonde, desiring an opportunity to incorporate his passion for concept/show bands like TISM, Devo and The Residents.

== History ==
=== Origins ===
Downey, a reformed alcoholic and passionate anti-drug ambassador, felt that a band called The Drugs would be resonant and controversial enough for a fresh and broad audience. He had hoped to use the controversy to throw a torch on the societal hypocrisy of pharmaceuticals.

Having developed a general concept of political satire, silliness and pop culture references, he had many of the tunes, costume designs and characters; centred around drug-slang (e'in', snow, track marks) before approaching old friend and former bandmate Tim Paxton ("David Live") who would operate as co-writer and co-frontman. Paxton, himself well established in the Sydney music scene, would offer a perfect observational critique to Downey's ignorance of more domestic cultural staples like cricket and rugby. Paxton would also offer a more politically centrist counterpoint to Downey's more leftist and punk approaches. Paxton was prepared to participate on the condition that he choose his own pseudonym, "David Live", which had been his favourite David Bowie album.

Paxton would be pivotal in also suggesting the band tour with a dedicated additional member, whose job it would be to operate the band's stage projection and heckle the band from the audience perspective. This suggestion separated The Drugs from comparable concept shows and the additional member would himself have a pseudonym ("John Citizen"). The role would go to three separate men during the band's life.

=== Record deal ===
The two would record their first four-track demo which included three of the songs that would eventually become singles. Playing only one show before being signed by David Vodicka to Rubber Records. Vodicka had been keen to use producer Chris Dickie (Annie Lennox, Morrissey, The Pogues) for an upcoming Even record and thought the pairing of The Drugs and Dickie would be a good opportunity to both trial the producer and offer The Drugs a better than average chance, the session would yield "Pop Song", in April 2000.

A transitional cast of members filled the standard rock band positions, but the studio sessions would feature a swathe of contributing artists including members of Insurge, Klinger, The Anyones, Frenzal Rhomb, Kids In The Kitchen, Yidcore, Indecent Obsession and Bluebottle Kiss.

Their EP The Only Way Is Up would follow in September 2000 for which they were nominated for Best Comedy Release at the ARIA Music Awards of 2001; they received two further nominations in the same category, in 2002 for their single, "The Bold and the Beautiful" and in 2002 for Music's in Trouble.

=== Debut album and success ===
In 2003 the band's single, "The Bold and the Beautiful", was performed on Rove Live with United States TV soap opera, The Bold and the Beautiful's cast member Ronn Moss miming bass guitar. At the ARIA Music Awards of 2002, the single was nominated for Best Comedy Release. The group's debut album, Music's in Trouble, was released in October 2003 to positive acclaim. It includes the two singles, ten new tracks, two bonus tracks from The Only Way Is Up EP and four filler tracks. A third single, "Burger King", was released for free online. The album also received a nomination for Best Comedy Release at the ARIA Music Awards of 2003.

During 2003 the Drugs and Melbourne-based rap metal band 28 Days engaged in a "feud": it started with an "internet stoush", escalated into "a bar brawl" with "over $4,000 damage to equipment", and initiated a police investigation. Baddley had posted a letter on his group's website which criticised 28 Days' lead singer, Jay Dunne, "accusing him of being homophobic and using hateful labels on stage at the Big Day Out" earlier that year.

Dunne and another member of 28 Days appeared at the Drugs gig at the Duke of Windsor Hotel, Windsor, in late February 2003. According to Patrick Donovan of The Age, "Witnesses said cigarette butts were thrown at the Sydney satirical/indie rock band while they played, a drink was poured over their computer, an amplifier was damaged and the tyres on their hire car were slashed." Baddley told Paul Cashmere of Undercover News, "This attack was poorly thought out and regardless of its success in destroying our show was a cowardly and stupid attack borne of an intellectually impaired 'pack mentality'."

=== Second album and split ===
In 2004 the Drugs released a track, "I Was a Teenage Voter", for a various artists' compilation album, Rock Against Howard. Their second album, The Very Next Of, was released in September 2004, which included "I Was a Teenage Voter", two then-radio-only tracks ("Rogue States" and "Appease Your God"), 15 new tracks and 7 filler tracks. This is their last album. In 2005 they played their final concert at the Metro in Sydney. Their back catalogue, except for The Very Next Of and "Burger King", were re-released in 2006 on iTunes.

In 2008 the Drugs reunited for a tour, We're All Going on Osama Holiday, and disbanded in the following year. The tour was in support of Portland, Oregon band The Punk Group, and featured Tom Riordan ("Tyler Noll") on bass in place of Paxton. In 2010 the trailer for a heavily fictionalised mockumentary on the group, Masking Agents, was uploaded to YouTube - the film itself was released in the following year, on its own or in a boxset containing both the band's albums and a randomly-selected single.

== Members ==
- Ian Baddley (Matt Downey) – keyboards, vocals
- David Live (Tim Paxton) – bass guitar, vocals
- Mark Tracks (Mark Quince and Mike Small) – guitar
- Benny Drill (David Cassell and Andrew Tolhurst) – guitar
- Harry Snow (Andrew Burgess, Daryl Sims and Luke Barling) – drums
- Tyler Noll (Tom Riorden) – guitar, vocals (auxiliary/tour musician)

Additional Live Members (Mr. John Citizen):

- Alex Moore
- Clyde Bramley
- Lindsay McDougall

== Discography ==
=== Albums ===
List of albums
Title	Album details
Music's in Trouble	Released: October 2002; Label: Rubber Records (RUB148); Formats: CD
The Very Next Of	Released: September 2004; Label: The Drugs (TD001); Formats: CD

=== Extended plays ===
List of Extended plays
Title	EP details
The Only Way Is Up	Released: 2000; Label: Elastic Records (LAST013); Formats: CD+CD_ROM

=== Singles ===
- "Pop Song" (April 2000)
- "The Bold and the Beautiful" (2002)
- "Metal vs. Hip Hop" (2002)
- "Burger King" (2002)
- "Was Sport Better in the '70s?" (2003)
- “Rogue States” (2005)

== Awards and nominations ==
=== ARIA Music Awards ===
The ARIA Music Awards are a set of annual ceremonies presented by Australian Recording Industry Association (ARIA), which recognise excellence, innovation, and achievement across all genres of the music of Australia. They commenced in 1987.

Year	Nominee / work	Award	Result	Ref.
2001	The Only Way Is Up	Best Comedy Release	Nominated	
2002	"The Bold and the Beautiful"	Best Comedy Release	Nominated	
2003	The Music Is Trouble	Best Comedy Release	Nominated	
