= Self Righteous Brothers =

Australian musical duo

- Origin: Sydney, New South Wales, Australia
- Genres: Folk; alternative rock
- Years active: 2004–2005
- Label: Shock
- Spinoff of: Frenzal Rhomb
- Past members: Lindsay McDougall; Jason Whalley

Self Righteous Brothers is the mainly acoustic, alternative rock music, side-project of Australian punk rockers, Frenzal Rhomb's lead singer Jason Whalley and guitarist, Lindsay McDougall which formed in 2004. Inspired by American band, the Frogs, their music is humorous and often explicit. They released an album, Love Songs for the Wrong at Heart, in 2004 and was re-released in March 2005 via Shock Records.

The group's members were called "insensitive" by the South Australian Tourism Commission for the album track, "There's no Town Like Snowtown", which refers to the infamous bodies-in-barrels murders and are associated with the South Australian town of that name. Blair Boyer of Punk Globe Magazine described how, "This song and other irreverent offerings", appear on that album.

dBMagazine' s Simon Foster opined, "they've managed to round up a swag of witty/offensive (take your pick) tunes with some great names and lyrics, a bunch of obscure instruments (Appalachian Mountain Dulcimer anyone?), and chucked them all on the one album [...] Although having a bit of fun, the lads display a surprisingly high amount of musical ability and 'Love Songs...' is great for a laugh... just don't set your expectations too high."

== Discography ==
- Love Songs for the Wrong at Heart (March 2005)
1. "Now You're Gone"
2. "Snowtown (There's no Town Like Snowtown)"
3. "The Only Gay Soldier"
4. "Daddy Drinks"
5. "Ruggedly Beautiful"
6. "Golden Wedding Anniversary"
7. "Self-Righteous"
8. "Sperm in Your Eyes"
9. "Who Will Buy"
10. "Brothers in Arms"
11. "Emosexual"
12. "Love on the Inside"
13. "My Love Barks"
14. "Dead Horse"

== Members ==
- Lindsay McDougall: – vocals, acoustic guitar, electric guitar, banjo, piano, violin, viola, cello, pan flute, glockenspiel, zither, timbales, cymbals
- Jason Whalley: – vocals, bass, acoustic guitar, electric guitar, vibraphone, piano, cello, drums, cabasa, vibraslap, Appalachian dulcimer

Credits:
