= The Only Way Is Up (disambiguation) =

The Only Way Is Up may refer to:

- "The Only Way Is Up", a 1988 hit dance song performed by Yazz and the Plastic Population
- The Only Way Is Up (EP), a 2000 extended play by The Drugs
- "The Only Way Is Up" (Martin Garrix and Tiësto song), 2015
