= Lindsay McDougall =

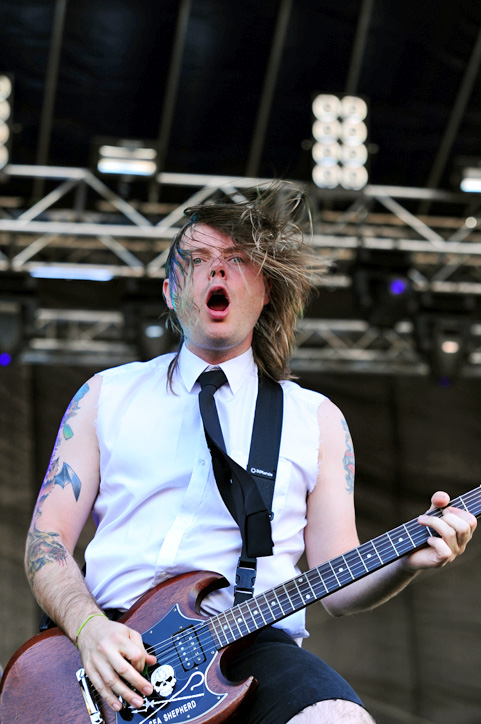
- Lindsay McDougall on lead guitar for Frenzal Rhomb, No Sleep Til Festival, December 2010.

Background information
- Also known as: The Doctor
- Born: Lindsay McAllister M. McDougall; 9 March 1978 (age 48)
- Origin: Sydney, Australia
- Genre: Punk rock
- Occupations: Musician; radio presenter; songwriter
- Instruments: Lead guitar, vocals
- Years active: 1992–present
- Labels: Shock, Fat Wreck Chords

Lindsay "The Doctor" McDougall (born 9 March 1978) is an Australian rock guitarist and radio presenter. Since 1996, he has been the lead guitarist of punk rock band, Frenzal Rhomb alongside lead singer Jay Whalley. He has co-written songs with fellow band members including their highest-charting single, "You Are Not My Friend". During 2003 McDougall organised Rock Against Howard, a compilation album, by various Australian musicians as a protest against incumbent Prime Minister, John Howard's government. It was released in August 2004, before the October federal election; Howard's coalition was nonetheless re-elected. In 2005, with Whalley, he co-hosted the Breakfast Show on national youth radio network Triple J, as Jay and the Doctor. In 2008, after Whalley left, he worked with Robbie Buck and Marieke Hardy. From 2010 to late 2014, he hosted the afternoon drive time programme. Since January 2018, McDougall has fronted the afternoon drive show on the ABC's local radio station in Wollongong, 97.3 ABC Illawarra. He is an animal rights activist and a vegan.

== Biography ==
Lindsay McDougall was born on 3 March 1978 and grew up in Sydney. His mother owns a health food store and he has younger twin brothers (born c. 1980). At 14 years old, he started playing guitar and his early influences were Pearl Jam, Alice in Chains, The Meanies and Cosmic Psychos. He played in high school bands, Time Bandits followed by Negla Delta from year 7 to year 10.

=== Frenzal Rhomb ===
In August 1996 Lindsay McDougall joined Australian punk rock band Frenzal Rhomb after original guitarist Ben Costello left to attend university and become an animal rights activist. Frenzal Rhomb had formed in Sydney in 1992 with mainstay Jason Whalley on lead vocals. In November 1996 the group issued a CD EP, Punch in the Face and, in January 1997, performed at Big Day Out. Late that year they toured the United States supporting less than jake with Blink-182 opening. In September 1997, the band released their third album, Meet the Family. It was their first to be certified gold by Australian Recording Industry Association (ARIA).

The next Frenzal Rhomb LP, A Man's Not a Camel was released in March 1999 and was supported by a nationwide tour. It remains their highest placed album to date, reaching No. 11 on the ARIA Albums Chart. It spawned their highest-charting single, "You Are Not My Friend", which reached No. 48. The song was co-written by McDougall with fellow band members Whalley, Lex Feltham and Gordy Forman. In April 2003 the band released Sans Souci, followed by Forever Malcolm Young in 2006.

During 2003 McDougall organised Rock Against Howard, a compilation album, by various Australian musicians as a protest against incumbent Prime Minister, John Howard's government. It was released in August 2004, before the October federal election, when Howard's coalition was re-elected. Also that year, McDougall and Whalley formed a side-project, Self Righteous Brothers, as an alternative rock group and issued the album, Love Songs for the Wrong at Heart on Shock Records. A track, "There's No Town Like Snowtown" referenced the Snowtown murders and was labelled "insensitive" by the Adelaide Tourism Commission after being played on radio. For the album, McDougall provided lead vocals, acoustic and electric guitars, banjo, piano, violin, viola, cello, pan flute, glockenspiel, zither, timbales, and cymbals.

In March 2009 Frenzal Rhomb undertook The Boys are Back in Brown Tour, the following year they toured Japan and played a number of festivals in Australia, including Come Together and Rollercoaster. In December 2010, they joined the No Sleep Til Festival Tour with punk and metal bands: Megadeth, Descendents, NOFX, Gwar and Dropkick Murphys. In August 2011 Frenzal Rhomb issued their next album Smoko at the Pet Food Factory.

=== Triple J ===
In January 2005 Lindsay McDougall and Whalley took over as hosts of national youth radio station, Triple J's Breakfast Show, under the name, Jay and the Doctor. New radio skits included Space Goat and Battalion 666, as well as the Under the Weather Sessions and The Friday Fuck Wit. In January 2007, former Lunch presenter, Myf Warhurst, joined McDougall and Whalley as a permanent member of the Breakfast Show team. Whalley left the show at the end of the year to travel overseas.

The 2008–2009 Breakfast Show line up was Robbie Buck, McDougall and Marieke Hardy, and were known as Robbie, Marieke and the Doctor. The show continued The Friday Fuck Wit segment and included the radio serial, Claytron, produced by Australian comedian Sam Simmons. The show also contained the weekly Like a Version segment where recording artists perform a cover version of a song of their choice.

In November 2009, Triple J announced that Tom Ballard and Alex Dyson, hosts of the 2009 Weekend Breakfast show, would take over as hosts of the 2010 Breakfast Show. The move was seen as a generational change catering to Triple J's 18- to 24-year-old core demographic. In December, McDougall was announced as the new host of the 3–5.30 pm afternoon Drive program for the following year. The move came after the 2008–2009 Drive presenter, Scott Dooley, signed with rival station, Nova 96.9.

At the start of 2010, McDougall asked listeners to take pictures of their "awesome stuff, precious things and treasured items" to help decorate his new blog and Triple J website. In May listeners were asked to use their Twitter accounts to tweet food band puns, which could then be mentioned in the show. The topic trended globally at number 1 and number 2 on Twitter under the hashtags #bandfooodpuns and #foodbandpuns. In March Drive with The Doctor was broadcast from Alice Springs for Triple J's One Night Stand. In July and August it was broadcast from Woodford, Queensland for Splendour in the Grass, the program included live sets and interviews with bands from the festival line up. Guests on the 2010 program included Jack White, Lou Reed, Bret Easton Ellis, Chuck Palahniuk, MUSE, Phoenix, Arcade Fire, Damon Albarn, Mumford & Sons and Dizzee Rascal. Since 2010 The Doctor's show has been produced by his EP, Hannah Wickes.

During his evening show on Triple J on Thursday 16 October 2014, McDougall announced that he will be leaving the show after 10 years of service to Triple J. He announced it with a song he recorded off air titled "I'm F***ing Off". He departed Triple J on 12 December 2014.

== Personal life ==
McDougall is a vegan and animal rights activist.

In May 2011 McDougall, told John Safran that he was allergic to wheat, eggplant, cashew and pistachio nuts in a discussion about his diet on Triple J. In August, McDougall asked for donations to United Nations High Commissioner for Refugees – he staged a homage to Children Collide's music video for "Loveless" while he had his long hair cut off.

McDougall married Jen Owens in October 2015 at Sublime Point.

Despite a strong band culture of drinking, McDougall quit alcohol on New Year's Day 2021, after his wife had done so three months previously.
