= Nancy Vandal =

Australian punk rock band

- Also known as: Meataxe; Hard Axe to Follow; Nancy Vandal and the Popgun Assassins
- Origin: Sydney, New South Wales, Australia
- Genres: Punk rock; pop punk; electropop
- Years active: 1993–2001; 2003; 2009–present
- Labels: Half Arsed/Shock; Shagpile
- Members: Fox Trotsky; JJ LaMoore; Dean Bakota; Robert Tickle; Gilli Pepper
- Website: web.archive.org/web/20181021085827/http://www.nancyvandal.com/

Nancy Vandal are an Australian punk rock band, who were formed in 1993 by Mike Foxall (Fox Trotsky) and Jeff Moore (JJ LaMoore). The band were named successively as Meataxe, Hard Axe to Follow and Nancy Vandal and the Popgun Assassins before settling on its shorter form. They disbanded in 2001, had a reunion performance in 2003 and reformed in 2009.

== History ==
Nancy Vandal was formed by Warrane College students Foxtrotsky/Fox Trotsky (Mike Foxall) and JJ LaMoore (Jeff Moore) as a pretend band in Sydney in 1993, as neither could play an instrument. Eventually the pair formed a real band, Meataxe, which played on campus, and at the Ungarie town hall (later renamed to Hard Axe to Follow, then Mr Pennywise, followed by Nancy Vandal and the Popgun Assassins). The original line-up of Nancy Vandal and the Popgun Assassins featured Trotsky and LaMoore plus Marcus "Rolfe" Rolfe on bass and vocals and Serene Dean Bakota on drums. Like Trotsky and LaMoore, Rolfe had never played bass before joining the band. At first, the music part of the band's live shows would generally take second place to gimmicks such as trivia competitions, prolonged verbal attacks on both fellow band members and audience and in one instance, a puppet show.

In 1994 Nancy Vandal and the Popgun Assassins recorded a 14-track debut album, Return of the Zombie Skate Poets from Planet Sex which included, "Space Girl with Bionic Breasts", "She Left Me for a Game Show Host Blues" and "I Slam Therefore I Am". Previously, some demo tapes had been released, such as the Mr Pennywise "Get Your Love Shoes On" featuring an earlier rendition of "Sex Toy".

By 1995 Nancy Vandal had begun touring, visiting Melbourne and Brisbane. Trotsky's band newsletter The Vandal's Voice became a fully fledged fanzine complete with comics, libellous proclamations, articles and CDs. The first issue included a give-away CD sampler, ShitHot '95, which consisted of tracks by Sydney's inner west punk rockers. Nancy Vandal supplied their cover version of "Footloose", originally by Kenny Loggins. Another CD giveaway in The Vandal's Voice was Slippery When Crap, a collection of cover versions of the band's favourite cock rock songs including Europe's "The Final Countdown", "Kickstart My Heart" by Mötley Crüe, "Pour Some Sugar on Me" by Def Leppard and "We're Not Gonna Take It" by Twisted Sister.

In 1996 Rolfe left Nancy Vandal and the Popgun Assassins. Jay Whalley (of Frenzal Rhomb) used the name, Jason Jasonn Beers when he replaced Rolfe, despite not being a bass guitarist. Whalley's first recording with the band was Slippery When Crap. From that time they were known as Nancy Vandal. The album The Debriefing Room followed before the end of the year and Whalley left to return to Frenzal Rhomb. JJ LaMoore switched to bass and Nancy Vandal expanded its line-up by incorporating several members of Newcastle band, Loose & the Horny Chicks.

Incorporating a keyboard player and a full brass section, Nancy Vandal's 1998 album, Bikini High Pool Massacre Part 3: Who Invited the Undead?, had them described as a ska band. Two singles were released, "Rock and Roll Concert" and "Move Over Satan" were major hits on the national youth radio network Triple J and Nancy Vandal was added to the line-ups of summer rock festivals such as Livid, Homebake and the Falls Festival. Throughout 1998 and 1999 Nancy Vandal toured constantly, supporting the likes of NOFX, Millencolin, Ten Foot Pole, Frenzal Rhomb and others.

Before long however, the seven-piece act had been reduced to five once more and Nancy Vandal began to experiment with an electro-pop sound. The late-1999 album I Wasted My Life was not a success and the band split up in 2001. Bakota and Moore joined the touring line-up of Bathurst band The Tenants and Foxall continued with his interests in comic book art and short film. Jay Whalley became a breakfast announcer on Triple J and is now on 'J's odyssey'.

The turn of the century saw their output decrease significantly. They have since performed only occasionally. In 2003 Nancy Vandal returned in a one-off reunion and farewell gig at Sydney University in December featuring members from every line-up.

2009 saw the band performing together again on a national tour. The tour was in support of their EP Quite Partial to Rock. The line-up was the same as the last incarnation of the band (I've Wasted My Life era). In 2009 the band also released The Vandals Voice which is a tribute album, and also the soundtrack of the DVD of the same name. Details of the DVD pack can be seen at http://www.nancyvandal.com/vv8.html. Artists on the tribute CD consist of Laura Imbruglia, Batfoot, and The Tenants.

In 2013 the album, Flogging a Dead Phoenix, was recorded by ex-bassist Beers to celebrate their 20-year anniversary. It is a chaotic blend of garage rock, punk infused with Motorhead riffs and a brass section. It was partly financed by support from a Pozible project. The release was accompanied by a 92-page full colour edition of the band's official magazine, The Vandal’s Voice.

Nancy Vandal promoted the album with an east coast tour through October and December 2013. Daniel Johnson of The Music caught their gig in November at the Zoo in Brisbane, he observed, "while they might have grown a little older, they thankfully haven't matured in the traditional sense... their back catalogue... are all as infectious and gloriously ridiculous as ever."

== Members ==
=== Current ===
- Fox Trotsky (Mike Foxall) – guitar, vocals (1993–2001, 2003, 2009–present)
- JJ La Moore (Jeff Moore) – guitar (1993-1996), bass guitar (1997–2001, 2003, 2009–present)
- Bombshell/Tommy Lee Turnip/Mr. Shit/So Cal Snuffel (Dean Bakota) – drums (1993-2001, 2003, 2009–present)
- Tess/Lickerov Finetesticals/T.Force/T-Bone/T-Banger/T-Burger/T-Man/T-Bag/T-shirt/Slick & thick RobDog (Robert Tickle) – trombone, keyboards (1997-2001, 2003, 2009–present)
- Gilli Pepper (Gillian Kilgour) – saxophone, vocals (1997-2001, 2003, 2009–present)

=== Former ===
- Marcus "Rolfe" Rolfe – bass guitar, vocals (1993–1995)
- Jason Jasonn Beers (Jay Whalley) – bass guitar, vocals (1995-1996)
- Poofy Arse Bogun (Anna Helme) – saxophone (1997)
- Telaviv Skywalker (Genevieve Murray) – trumpet, vocals (1997-1999)

== Discography ==
=== Albums ===
- Return of the Zombie Skate poets from Planet Sex (by Nancy Vandal and the Popgun Assassins) (1994) – Half Arsed Records (FNARR 69)
- 1, 2, 3 Baby Yeah (1995) – Half Arsed Records (FNARR 70)
- The Debriefing Room (1996) – Half Arsed Records (FNARR 73)
- Bikini High Pool Party Massacre 3, Who Invited the Undead? (1997) – Half Arsed Records/Shock Records (FNARR 77)
- I've Wasted My Life (1999) – Shagpile Records (SHAGCD2045)
- 50 Faves from Beyond the Grave (compilation, 2000)
- Flogging a Dead Phoenix (2 September 2013) – Erotic Volcano Records (EVR03)

=== Extended plays ===
- Slippery When Crap (1995)
- Rock & Roll Concert (1997)
- ...You're Fired (1998)
- Move Over Satan (1998) Half Arsed Records/Shock Records (FNARR78)
- Quite Partial to Rock (2009)
