= The Cup of Pestilence =

Studio album by Frenzal Rhomb
- Released: 7 April 2023
- Recorded: Colorado, US
- Genre: Skate punk, melodic hardcore
- Length: 32:36
- Label: Fat Wreck Chords
- Producer: Bill Stevenson; Jason Livermore; Andrew Berlin

Frenzal Rhomb chronology
Hi-Vis High Tea (2017)	The Cup of Pestilence (2023)

Singles from The Cup of Pestilence
- 1. "Where Drug Dealers Take Their Kids" Released: 15 February 2023; 2. "Thought It Was Yoga but It Was Ketamine" Released: 22 March 2023

The Cup of Pestilence is the tenth studio album by Australian punk band Frenzal Rhomb. The album was recorded in October 2022 in Colorado, with Bill Stevenson as the producer. The album was released on 7 April 2023, and is the first album by the band to feature Michael Dallinger on bass guitar.

The album was recorded at The Blasting Room in Fort Collins, Colorado, which is known for its high-quality punk and rock recordings. The band shared short videos of the recording process on their Instagram page.

On 15 February, the band released the first single from the album, "Where Drug Dealers Take Their Kids". On 22 March, the band released the second single, "Thought It Was Yoga but It Was Ketamine", along with its music video.

On the release date, Lindsay started a live stream on Frenzal Rhomb's Facebook page and played every song from the album.

== Artwork ==
The album artwork was created by Glenno Smith, who had previously worked on the artwork for the band's 2017 album Hi-Vis High Tea.

The album's inlay includes the line "In loving memory of Jimmy Forman, 4/12/38 – 4/12/21", dedicated to Gordy's father.

== Japanese release ==
A "magical" vinyl is set to be released in Japan, and there will be a bonus item exclusively available in Japan only, separate from the original record.

== Reception ==
Jeff Jenkins said, "This record rages with the energy of a band just starting out. We'd almost forgotten how much fun Frenzal Rhomb are.. though the album is probably not suitable for instore play."

== Track listing ==
The Cup of Pestilence track listing
No.	Title	Length
1.	"Where Drug Dealers Take Their Kids"	1:41
2.	"Gone to the Dogs"	1:27
3.	"The Wreckage"	1:37
4.	"Dead Man's Underpants"	1:25
5.	"Lil Dead$hit"	1:24
6.	"Laneway Dave"	1:37
7.	"Instant Coffee"	1:53
8.	"Dog Tranquiliser"	1:49
9.	"I Think My Neighbour Is Planning to Kill Me"	2:34
10.	"Horse Meat"	1:12
11.	"How to Make Gravox"	1:39
12.	"Deathbed Darren"	1:32
13.	"Tontined"	1:59
14.	"Fireworks"	1:30
15.	"Hospitality and Violence"	1:29
16.	"Those People"	1:55
17.	"Old Mate Neck Tattoo"	2:00
18.	"Finally I Can Get Arrested in This Town"	1:36
19.	"Thought It Was Yoga but It Was Ketamine"	2:17

== Personnel ==
Frenzal Rhomb

- Jason Whalley – lead vocals
- Lindsay McDougall – guitar
- Michael Dallinger – bass guitar, backing vocals
- Gordy Forman – drums

Technical personnel

- Bill Stevenson – producer, engineer
- Jason Livermore – mixing, producer, engineer
- Andrew Berlin – producer, engineer
- Chris Beeble – engineer
- Jeff 'Rhino' Neumann – drum tech
- Glenno Smith – cover artist

== Charts ==
Chart performance for The Cup of Pestilence
Chart (2023)	Peak position
Australian Albums (ARIA)	12
