= List of record labels: 0–9 =

This is a list of notable record labels, starting with 0–9.

List of record labels
A–H	I–Q	R–Z	0–9

== Characters ==
- +1 Records
- -ismist Recordings
- !K7 Music

== 0–9 ==
- 1theK
- 0207 Def Jam
- 2.13.61
- 2 Tone Records
- 3 Beat Records
- 4AD
- 4 Star Records
- 4th & B'way Records
- 5 Minute Walk
- 5 Rue Christine
- 7Spin Music
- 7th Magnitude
- 10K Projects
- 12 Tónar
- 12k
- 13th Planet Records
- 14th Floor Records
- 16th Avenue Records
- 19 Recordings
- 20th Century Fox Records
- 21st Circuitry
- 24 Hour Service Station
- 33rd Street Records
- 50 Records
- 50 Skidillion Watts
- 75 Ark
- 77 Records
- 88rising
- 99 Records
- 143 Records
- 222 Records
- 300 Elektra Entertainment
- 300 Entertainment
- 301Studios
- 415 Records
- 430 West Records
- 504 Records
- 550 Music
- 604 Records
- 679 Artists
- 960 Music Group
- 1017 Records
- 1605
- 1965 Records

== See also ==
- List of electronic music record labels
- List of independent UK record labels
