= Meet the Family =

Meet the Family may refer to:

- Meet the Family (album) (1997), Frenzal Rhomb's third studio album
- Meet the Family (TV series) (2013), Canadian hidden camera television series
