= Livid (festival) =

Australian alternative rock music festival (1989-2003)

Livid was an Australian alternative rock music festival held annually from 1989 to 2003. Created by Peter Walsh and Natalie Jeremijenko, the original idea of showcasing both the arts (Natalie) and music (Peter) in the one event was standardised as late as October/early November from 1991 until 2003. While it has never been officially cancelled, no festivals have been held since 2003 and neither the organisers nor promoters have announced any intention to restart Livid in the future.

Headline artists for the festival's most recent dates included Linkin Park, the White Stripes and Yeah Yeah Yeahs in 2003; Powderfinger and Oasis in 2002; and Butthole Surfers, Billy Bragg and Ash in 2001.

The festival began in 1989 with a 1500-strong audience at the University of Queensland in Brisbane. Its growing popularity saw it move to Davies Park in the Brisbane suburb of West End and later the RNA Showgrounds. Until the establishment of the Homebake festival in 1995, Livid was the only major Australian rock festival apart from the Big Day Out. In 1990, the Livid festival became the first of the recent "touring" festivals when it was held at Harold Park Paceway in Sydney's Glebe. This event was infamous for the non-appearance of Red Head King Pin, who the promoters said refused to come out of the toilet in his hotel to appear. An ad hoc band consisting of members of the Go-Betweens and other musicians reappeared to attempt to quell the crowd. In 2002, the festival attempted a national move and held events in Sydney and Melbourne. Despite the reasonable success of this move, Livid was now in direct competition with Sydney's Homebake festival and the nationwide Big Day Out, and citing a "scarcity of headline acts on this year's international festival touring circuit", the event's promoters announced that the show would not be held in 2004. Livid has not been held since, despite initial promises that it would return in 2005.

The State Library of Queensland contains an archive of the Livid Festival including posters, t-shirts, CDs and ephemera.

== Selected annual line-ups ==
- January 1989 – Go-Betweens, Chris Bailey, Ups and Downs, Died Pretty, Great Caesar's Ghost (Venue - University of Queensland)
- December 1989 – TISM, Pop Will Eat Itself, Died Pretty, the Hummingbirds, the Bats (Venue - RNA Showgrounds)
- June 1990 – the Fall, Red Head King Pin, the Bats, the Tactics, the Falling Joys, the Reels, Grant McLennan, Sea Stories, Clouds, Dave Graney and the White Buffalos, Whipsnap, Crystal Set (Venue - Harold Park Paceway)
- December 1990 – TISM, Mudhoney, Died Pretty, Falling Joys, Clouds, Fear of Falling, Dan Mullins (Venue - RNA Showgrounds)
- 1991 – Ratcat, the Wonder Stuff, Clouds, the Hummingbirds, Not Drowning Waving, Caligula, the Tellers (Venue - Davies Park, West End)
- 1992 – Nick Cave and the Bad Seeds, Michelle Shocked, Lush, Clouds, Cruel Sea, Died Pretty, Superchunk, Def FX, the Welcome Mat, Tumbleweed, the Meanies, Smudge, Caligula, Dave Graney, Screamfeeeder, Custard, You Am I, Rubber Bug, Grim Rippers (Venue - Davies Park, West End)
- 1993 – Siouxsie and the Banshees, Beasts of Bourbon, Ween, Andy Prieboy, Ed Kuepper, the Clouds, the Falling Joys, Tumbleweed, Kim Salmon and the Surrealists, Headless Chickens, Cosmic Psychos, Robert Forster, Caligula, Dave Graney, You Am I, Underground Lovers, the Dreamkillers, Head Like a Hole, Front End Loader, Screamfeeder, Chopper Division, Rubber Bug, Budd, Fur, Midget, Melniks, Clag (Venue - Davies Park, West End)
- 1994 – Beastie Boys, Helmet, Frank Black, Buffalo Tom, Superchunk, Tumbleweed, D.I.G., Meanies, Tiddas, Crow, Hoss, Def FX, Chalk, C.O.W., Dave Graney and the Coral Snakes, Underground Lovers, Kim Salmon, Pangaea, Dreamkillers, Spiderbait, Powderfinger, Trout Fishing in Quebec, Dream Poppies, Hateman, Skunkhour, Blowhard, Magic Dirt, Dirty Three (Venue - Davies Park, West End)
- 1995 – Rollins Band, Cruel Sea, Babes in Toyland, Morphine, You Am I, Nomeansno, Alex Chilton, Paw, Jello Biafra, Magic Dirt the Mark of Cain, Even, Frenzal Rhomb, Grant McLennan, the Lizard Train, Bodyjar, Lewd, Nunchukka Superfly, Screamfeeder, Fireballs, Glide, Spiderbait, Front End Loader, Custard, Webster, Elevation, Toothfaeries, Supergroove, Skunkhour, Kellie Lloyd, Kev Carmody, Small World Experience, Two Star Club, Isis, Fabulous Nobodies, Porcelain, Powderfinger (Bernard and Darren acoustic w/strings). (Venue - Davies Park, West End)
- 1996 – Garbage, silverchair, Everclear, the Jesus Lizard, Regurgitator, Ash, Tumbleweed, Weezer, Powderfinger, Tiddas, the Mark of Cain, Ammonia, Toothfaeries, Snout, Turtlebox, Crop Circles, Blowhard, Precision Oiler, Fireballs, Lyngren, Paradise Motel, Gaslight Radio, Trout Fishing in Quebec, Dream Poppies, Mr. Blonde, Isis, CIV, Out of the Mud, iNsuRge, Pollyanna, Tim Steward, Louis Tillet & Charlie Owen, Ben Lee, Black Eyed Susans, Shock Fungus (Venue - Davies Park, West End)
- 1997 – Devo, Dinosaur Jr., Cake, Powderfinger, Veruca Salt, Spiderbait, Ben Folds Five, Reef, Ween, Sneaker Pimps, Dave Graney and the Coral Snakes, Bloodhound Gang, Lewd, Jason Fawlkner Band, Aquanaught, Ammonia, Webster, Pangaea, Millencollin, Screamfeeder, Sidewinder, Shihad, Tomorrow People, Bodyjar, Grinspoon, Zeni Geva, the Porkers, Strapping Young Lad, Not From There, the Superjesus, Bulldozer, Ed Kuepper, Cordrazine, Damien Lovelock, Steve Kilbey, Black Eyed Susans, Rebecca's Empire, Resin Dogs (Venue - RNA Showgrounds)
- 1998 – Public Enemy, Pulp, Sonic Youth, Regurgitator, the Living End, the Dandy Warhols, Money Mark, the Whitlams, Grinspoon, Jebediah, Custard, Resin Dogs, Luna, Even, Toothfaeries, Weave, Lavish, the Mavis's, Far Out Corporation, Frank Yamma, Pollen, the Gadflys, Fourplay, Fur, the Sunrize Band, Sprung Monkey, sixFThick, 5678s, Guttermouth, the Hellacopters, Pitchshifter, Toe to Toe, Nancy Vandal, Nokturnl, Underground Lovers, Tiddas, Crow, Tribal Link, Karma County, Broken Head, Robert Forster, Endorphin, Pre Shrunk, the Avalanches, High Pass Filter (Venue - RNA Showgrounds)
- 1999 – the Offspring, Garbage, Powderfinger, Suede, Spiderbait, Mercury Rev, Frenzal Rhomb, You Am I, Sebadoh, Not From There, Fountains of Wayne, Coloured Stone, Gerling, Ben Lee, Alex Lloyd, Something for Kate, Shihad, Violetine, Toothfaeries, Drag, Taxi, Suicidal Tendencies, Reel Big Fish, Supersuckers, Area 7, Less Than Jake, 28 Days, John Lee Spider, Rebecca's Empire, Deadstar, Kellie Lloyd & Tim Steward, Jimmy Little, Merrick & Rosso, Josh Abrahams, Groove Terminator, Sonic Animation (Venue - RNA Showgrounds)
- 2000 – the Cure, Green Day, Lou Reed, the Living End, Millencollin, No Doubt, 28 Days, Boss Hogg, the Dandy Warhols, Regurgitator, Grinspoon, Royal Crown Revue, Muse, Not From There, Yo La Tengo, Magic Dirt, Mark Lanegan, Feeder, Rocket Science, George, the Anyones, Motor Ace, Bart Willoughby, Testeagles, Unwritten Law, Bodyjar, Guttermouth, No Fun at All, Sunk Loto, the Hippos, Rollerball, David Bridie, Salmonella Dub, Merrick & Rosso, Augie March, Speedstar, Four Horse Town, Jungle Brothers, Sonic Animation (Venue - RNA Showgrounds)
- 2001 – Butthole Surfers, Rollins Band, Stereo MC's, Something for Kate, Regurgitator, Fun Lovin' Criminals, Ash, Billy Bragg, 28 Days, Tortoise, Alex Lloyd, John Butler Trio, Magic Dirt, Eskimo Joe, Augie March, the Mark of Cain, Gerling, Sekiden, the Cruel Sea, the Superjesus, Machine Gun Fellatio, Last Days of April, Palladium, Shutterspeed, the Ataris, Area-7, Superheist, Good Charlotte, the Hives, Nerf Herder, H2O, Zoo Bombs, One Dollar Short, Blowhard, Giants of Science, Evan Dando, George, Darren Hanlon, Even, Wil Anderson, the Avalanches (Venue - RNA Showgrounds)
- 2002 – Powderfinger, Oasis, Mercury Rev, Grinspoon, Something for Kate, …And You Will Know Us by the Trail of Dead, Motor Ace, Superheist, the Butterfly Effect, Giants of Science, Morrissey, John Butler Trio, George, Dirty Three, Mogwai, Machine Gun Fellatio, Dan Brodies and the Broken Arrows, the D4, Seafood, Speedstar, Shutterspeed, Halfday, Unwritten Law, Sum 41, Bodyjar, the International Noise Conspiracy, Strung Out, Dropkick Murphys, One Dollar Short, Seraphs Coal, Stalkers, the Disables, Mouthguard, the Streets, Gerling, Tex Perkins and the Dark Horses, Waikiki, Wil Anderson, the Lucksmiths, Butterfingers (Venue - RNA Showgrounds)
- 2003 – Linkin Park, the White Stripes, the Living End, Jurassic 5, Black Rebel Motorcycle Club, the Roots, Me First and the Gimme Gimmes, Frenzal Rhomb, Yeah Yeah Yeahs, Turbonegro, Resin Dogs, Goldfinger, Rocket Science, Butterfingers, Gelbison, For Amusement Only, Lamb, Less Than Jake, Pacifier, Liars, Dexter, the Hellacopters, Little Birdy, Toe To Toe, the Anyones, Sunk Loto (Venue - RNA Showgrounds)
