= Totally Unicorn =

Australian metal band

- Origin: Wollongong, New South Wales, Australia
- Genres: Metalcore, mathcore, post-hardcore
- Years active: 2010–present
- Spinoffs: Tanned Christ
- Spinoff of: Hospital the Musical, Ohana
- Members: Drew Gardner; Aaron Streatfeild; Michael Bennett; Dean Podmore
- Past members: Robert Mudge; Clancy Tucker; Tim McMahon; Kerim Erkin; Lee Nielson; Adam Myers
- Website: totallyunicornmusic.bandcamp.com

Totally Unicorn are an Australian metalcore band, originally from Wollongong, New South Wales and now based in Sydney. Forming in 2010, the band are best known for their highly energetic and unpredictable live shows, which often feature partial or complete nudity, jumping off the stage or other raised platforms and interacting with individual audience members. The band's live reputation has brought them to several high-profile tours and support slots, including shows with Kvelertak, La Dispute, The Chariot, Frenzal Rhomb, Rosetta, Cancer Bats and Tonight Alive.

== History ==
=== 2010–2015: Early EPs ===
Totally Unicorn were formed in 2010 following the split of the band Hospital the Musical, which featured vocalist Drew Gardner, original drummer Michael Bennett and original guitarist Clancy Tucker. The three were joined by bassist Robert Mudge, formerly of Thirroul band Ohana. An EP, Horse Hugger, was released on 3 December 2010.

March 2011 saw the departure of Mudge from the band, as he left to pursue a teaching career overseas. His final show with the band was opening for Frenzal Rhomb in the band's hometown of Wollongong. Mudge was then replaced by Tim McMahon. The band ended 2011 with a tour featuring Sydney band Gay Paris and Adelaide band God God Dammit Dammit. The three bands contributed two new tracks apiece to a three-way split EP entitled Totally Gay Dammit.

In May 2012, the band went on a national Australian tour as the opening act for Tonight Alive. The band were originally going to be joined by The Dangerous Summer, but they were replaced by UK band Young Guns.

August 2012 saw the band announce the release of their first vinyl release, a penis-shaped record entitled 7 Inches which featured two new songs. The initial release sold out within days and put the band at the top of the best-seller's list on Bandcamp's front page. The vinyl was later re-released as 9 Inches, which, as its title suggests, added two extra inches to the original vinyl.

In October 2012, guitarist Clancy Tucker announced via Facebook that he was leaving the band to relocate to Alice Springs and become a nurse. His final show with the band was in Fairy Meadow in December 2012, opening for American punk rock band Pour Habit. It was then announced that the band had enlisted two new guitarists to replace Tucker: Aaron Streatfeild (formerly of Snakes Get Bad Press) and Kerim Erkin.

The band were selected as one of the bands on the first Hits & Pits line-up, a national punk-rock-oriented touring festival. The band played alongside acts such as Mad Caddies, A Wilhelm Scream and The Flatliners.

In April 2013, it was announced that Totally Unicorn would be releasing a split seven-inch with Adelaide band Robotosaurus. The band would also head out on a co-headlining tour, which served as the final shows for Robotosaurus. The vinyl was released independently in July 2013.

The band opened for Norwegian metal band Kvelertak at their headlining show in Sydney in September 2013 before heading out on tour with UK band Rolo Tomassi for the first half of an extensive national tour.

=== 2015–2019: Dream Life & Sorry ===
It was announced in February 2015 that the band would be opening for Norma Jean on the Sydney leg of their Australian tour. In September 2015, the band announced the departure of bassist Tim McMahon. He was replaced by Lee Nielson, another former member of Snakes Get Bad Press.

In 2015, the band announced their signing to independent Wollongong label Farmer & The Owl. With the signing came the announcement of their first release under the label – a 7-inch vinyl with two brand-new songs, released as a Record Store Day exclusive. The 7-inch, entitled sometimes i sit and drink, and sometimes i just drink, was named in tribute to Courtney Barnett's 2015 album Sometimes I Sit and Think, and Sometimes I Just Sit. The artwork for the 7-inch also parodied Barnett's hand-drawn album cover.

In June 2016, Totally Unicorn announced the completion and imminent release of their debut album. Entitled Dream Life, the album was released on 29 July. The album features guest vocals from Heavy Heavy Low Low's Rob Smith and High Tension's Karina Utomo.

In February 2017, drummer Michael Bennett announced his imminent departure from the band following a handful of remaining shows. His last came at Sydney's Black Wire Records on 26 March 2017. Bennett was replaced by former Robotosaurus drummer Adam Myers.

In March 2017, it was announced that the band would be going on tour nationally with Frenzal Rhomb. The band also played with The Dillinger Escape Plan in October, playing their second-last Sydney show on their final Australian tour. In December 2017, Erkin announced that he would be leaving the band. He was not replaced, converting the band back into a quartet.

In October 2018, the band released a new single, "Grub." This was followed by the release of "I'll Be Fine Now" in February 2019, and the release of their second studio album Sorry in April 2019. In October 2019, Nielson played his final show with the band at the Yours & Owls Festival in Wollongong. He was replaced by Dean Podmore, formerly of Gay Paris and Surprise Wasp, prior to the band's national tour supporting Cancer Bats.

=== 2020–present: High Spirits//Low Life ===
The band's activity was minimised in 2020 due to the COVID-19 pandemic. They played two socially-distanced sets in one night at Sydney venue Crowbar in August 2020, where actor Richard Karn was hired from Cameo to be the show's "safety supervisor" via a video message.

In January 2021, the band released the stand-alone single "Like". This was followed by a string of singles throughout the rest of the year: "Trust Fund Glee", "Yeah, Coach" and "Fri(ends)". "Trust Fund Glee" featured guest vocals from Dan Cunningham of Sydney punk band ARSE, while "Fr(iends)" featured guest vocals from Jason Whalley of Frenzal Rhomb.

In December 2021, the band announced their third studio album High Spirits//Low Life, which was released on 18 February 2022.

In October 2026, the band confirmed the return of original drummer Michael Bennett to the band.

== In other media ==
- In 2012, members of the band were featured in an episode of Channel Seven's Border Security: Australia's Front Line as Rob Smith from the band Heavy Heavy Low Low attempted to get into the country to tour.
- In 2014, The band had a beetroot cake named after them in Same Same But Different, a recipe book by Australian chef Poh Ling Yeow; at the time, she was the sister-in-law of former drummer Bennett.
- In August 2014, Brisbane band Violent Soho selected the band's video for "Cool Dads with Cool Sons" for their guest programming of the Australian music video show rage. Totally Unicorn had opened for the band at one of their headlining shows in Sydney the month prior.
- The band wrote and performed the theme music for Greg Larsen's controversial weekly podcast The Greg Larsen Show which premiered in January 2024.
- In 2025, The Greg Larsen Show mockumentary video series was released on the Grouse House YouTube channel, with a portion of the band's song "Parrot" featured as the intro music.

== Members ==
=== Current members ===
- Drew Gardner – lead vocals (2010–present)
- Aaron Streatfeild – guitar (2012–present), backing vocals (2019–present)
- Dean Podmore – bass, backing vocals (2019–present)
- Michael Bennett – drums (2010–2017, 2026–present)

=== Former members ===
- Robert Mudge – bass (2010–2011)
- Clancy Tucker – guitar (2010–2012)
- Tim McMahon – bass (2011–2015)
- Kerim Erkin – guitar (2012–2017)
- Lee Nielson – bass (2015–2019)
- Adam Myers – drums (2017–2026)

=== Live substitutes ===
- Mark Owen – guitar (2011)
- Mark Davies – drums (2020)

== Discography ==
=== Studio albums ===
Title	Album details
Dream Life	Released: 29 July 2016; Label: Farmer & The Owl (FATO04); Format: CD, LP, digital download, streaming
Sorry	Released: 12 April 2019; Label: Farmer & The Owl (FATO022); Format: CD, LP, digital download, streaming
High Spirits//Low Life	Scheduled: 18 February 2022; Label: Farmer & The Owl / BMG; Format: CD, LP, digital download, streaming

=== Extended plays ===
Title	EPs details
Horse Hugger	Released: 3 December 2010; Label: Beard Of Bees (BOB 001); Format: CD, DD
Totally Gay Dammit (with Gay Paris and God God Dammit Dammit)	Released: November 2011; Format: CD, DD
7 Inches	Released: October 2012; Format: LP; Note: Limited to 200
9 Inches	Released: February 2013; Format: LP; Note: Limited to 200
Together Alone (with Robotosaurus)	Released: 6 June 2013; Label: Monolith; Format: LP, DD; Note: LP limited to 200
sometimes i sit and drink, and sometimes i just drink	Released: April 2015; Label: Farmer & The Owl (FATO006); Format: LP, DD

=== Singles ===
Title	Year	Album
"Customer Service Station"	2016	Dream Life
"Old Cute & Putrified"	2016	Dream Life
"Grub"	2018	Sorry
"I'll Be Fine Now"	2019	Sorry
"Prized Pig"	2019	Sorry
"Like"	2021	non album single
"Trust Fund Glee"	2021	High Spirits//Low Life
"Yeah, Coach"	2021	High Spirits//Low Life
"Fri(ends)"	2021	High Spirits//Low Life
"Not Winning"	2022	High Spirits//Low Life

== Awards and nominations ==
=== National Live Music Awards ===
The National Live Music Awards (NLMAs) are a broad recognition of Australia's diverse live industry, celebrating the success of the Australian live scene. The awards commenced in 2016.

Year	Nominee / work	Award	Result
National Live Music Awards of 2016	Themselves	Live Hard Rock Act of the Year	Nominated
National Live Music Awards of 2017	Themselves	Live Hard Rock Act of the Year	Nominated
