= Rock Against Howard =

2004 compilation album

Compilation album by Various Artists
- Released: 30 August 2004
- Genre: Rock
- Length: 110:53
- Label: F'ckAll/Shock
- Producer: Lindsay McDougall

Rock Against Howard, Musicians Against the Liberal Government is an Australian compilation CD featuring anti-Coalition musicians, released in 2004. The project hoped to inspire young voters to turn out in federal elections that year to vote against then-Prime Minister John Howard,. Howard's party prevailed in 2004 but was ousted in 2007 with Howard losing his own seat.

Rock Against Howard was organised by Frenzal Rhomb guitarist Lindsay McDougall, when he realised every musician he knew felt the same way about Howard. McDougall told Daniel Johnson of The Age that "I wanted to get more and different music fans and acts in on the idea of Rock Against Howard, and it also adequately reflects my taste in music, because I've got a bunch of my favourite bands on here as well." The project was inspired by the American Rock Against Bush compilations, and takes on a similar format. All profits from album sales go to refugee charities through the Refugee Action Coalition, an ironic tribute to Howard's stance on asylum seekers.

The music on the release is politically oriented, with the first disc featuring previously released songs, and a disc of live and otherwise previously unreleased work on the second. The style of music varies widely, with punk rock, hip-hop, and even show tunes.

== Track listing ==
=== Disc 1 ===
Musicians Against the Liberal Government

1. H-Block 101 - "Reason Why" - 2:40
2. Bodyjar - "Is It A Lie?" - 2:33
3. Something for Kate - "Best Weapon" - 4:50
4. The Givegoods - "Collar to Colour" - 4:23
5. David Bridie - "Nation (of the Heartless Kind)" - 4:33
6. The City Lights - "A Big Star" - 2:55
7. Peabody - "A Resurrected Man" - 3:5
8. 78 Saab - "Sound of Lies" - 4:26
9. Even - "Sunshine Comes" - 3:2
10. Sulo - "Wash" - 2:54
11. The Anyones - "Gun Him Down" - 4:41
12. Razel - "The Arse Song" - 3:35
13. The Resin Dogs - "Rebel" - 3:40
14. Youth Group - "Drown" - 4:16
15. Frenzal Rhomb - "White World" - 1:32
16. TISM - "The Phillip Ruddock Blues" - 7:9

=== Disc 2 ===
Unreleased and Unreal

1. Front End Loader - "4 Star Heritage Arsehole [live]" - 2:40
2. The Herd - "Honest J" - 2:57
3. The Drugs - "I Was a Teenage Voter" - 2:28
4. Godnose - "At the End of the Day" - 2:59
5. Unpaid Debt - "Call it a Day" - 3:27
6. Little Johnny (a.k.a. Pauline Pantsdown) - "I'm Sorry!" - 3:32
7. Toekeo - "John Howard Is a Filthy Slut" - 3:41
8. Mindsnare - "To the Boil" - 2:32
9. Bemon Other - "Keep on Raping in the Free World" - 1:12
10. The Persian Rugs - "Half-wit" - 2:17
11. Steve Townson and the Conscripts - "Tonight We Storm the Bastille" - 3:15
12. Major - "Liar" - 4:5
13. The Fauves - "Get Fucked" - 3:10
14. The Reservations - "Calling Out I'm Through" - 2:55
15. George's Bush - "Evil Little Man" - 4:17
16. Eddie Perfect - "John Howard's Bitches" - 3:56
17. The Thighblasters - "How'd You All Get to Be So Dumb?" - 1:44
18. Too Green for Summer (featuring Senator Andrew Bartlett) - "I Don't Believe it" - 2:32
