= Hi-Vis High Tea =

Studio album by Frenzal Rhomb
- Released: 26 May 2017
- Recorded: Colorado, USA
- Genre: Punk rock Pop punk Skate punk Melodic hardcore
- Length: 35:02
- Label: Shock Records, Fat Wreck Chords
- Producer: Bill Stevenson, Jason Whalley

Frenzal Rhomb chronology
| We Lived Like Kings (We Did Anything We Wanted) (2016) | Hi-Vis High Tea (2017) | The Cup of Pestilence (2023) |

Hi-Vis High Tea is the ninth studio album by Australian punk band Frenzal Rhomb. It was recorded in Colorado, USA, with Bill Stevenson as producer and was released in May 2017. It was nominated at the 2017 ARIA Music Awards for Best Hard Rock/Heavy Metal Album, but lost to Northlane's Mesmer.

The album is the first since a series of medical mishaps befall the band, delaying recording and release. Vocalist Jay Whalley underwent brain surgery in 2013 in order to have a parasitic tapeworm removed, as documented in the song Pigworm, drummer Gordy Forman suffered a 2015 broken arm following a stage dive attempt during a Perth concert, and guitarist Lindsay McDougall was forced to undergo emergency eye surgery in the same year.

== Track listing ==
| No. | Title | Length |
|---|---|---|
| 1. | "Classic Pervert" | 0:37 |
| 2. | "Ray Ahn Is My Spirit Animal" | 1:46 |
| 3. | "Cunt Act" | 1:50 |
| 4. | "Sneeze Guard" | 0:53 |
| 5. | "I'm Shelving Stacks (As I'm Stacking Shelves)" | 1:46 |
| 6. | "The Criminals' Airline" | 1:25 |
| 7. | "Storage Unit Pill Press" | 1:22 |
| 8. | "School Reunion" | 1:07 |
| 9. | "Ex Pat" | 2:30 |
| 10. | "Beer and a Shot" | 2:08 |
| 11. | "The Black Prince" | 1:49 |
| 12. | "Bunbury" | 1:22 |
| 13. | "Pigworm" | 1:05 |
| 14. | "Digging a Hole for Myself" | 1:23 |
| 15. | "Don't Cast Aspergers On Me" | 1:25 |
| 16. | "Messed Up" | 3:14 |
| 17. | "Everyone I Know Has Mental Problems" | 2:12 |
| 18. | "Waiting for the Postman" | 1:50 |
| 19. | "Organ Donor" | 1:51 |
| 20. | "Food Court" | 3:27 |

== Charts ==
Chart performance for Hi-Vis High Tea
| Chart (2021) | Peak position |
|---|---|
| Australian Albums (ARIA) | 9 |
