= Lonerider =

Studio album by The Anyones
- Released: 2000
- Recorded: 1999–2000
- Genres: Indie rock, rock
- Length: 41:13
- Label: Shock Records
- Producer: The Anyones

The Anyones chronology
Lonerider (2000)	The Anyones (2003)

Lonerider is the debut album by the Australian band The Anyones. It was released in 2000 on Shock Records. It was recorded in the winter of 1999 at Hothouse Studios in St Kilda, Victoria.

== Track listing ==
No.	Title	Length
1.	"If the Party Wasn't Over"	3:17
2.	"Orange Bubblegum"	4:38
3.	"Trigger"	4:11
4.	"Selemat Pagi"	3:21
5.	"Seeds"	4:20
6.	"Lonerider"	4:07
7.	"The Fraides"	2:40
8.	"Got My Mind"	2:31
9.	"TV Time"	5:07
10.	"Are You Ready"	3:43
11.	"Something Special"	3:50

== Personnel ==
- Malcolm Pinkerton - guitar, vocals
- Steve Pinkerton - drums, vocals
- Nick Murphy - bass, vocals
- Adrian Gardner - guitar, vocals

== Notes ==
- The track Are You Ready featured a guest guitar solo from Midnight Oil guitarist Martin Rotsey.
