= Mach Pelican =

Australian musical group

- Origin: Perth, Western Australia
- Genre: Punk rock
- Years active: 1996–2007; 2009; 2011; 2019; 2024-
- Labels: Shock Records; Stomp Entertainment; Bop Records
- Members: K-Rock; Atsu Longrun; Toshi-8Beat
- Website: Official website

Mach Pelican are a punk rock band of Japanese origin formed in Perth, Western Australia, Australia in 1996. In 1998, they relocated to Melbourne, Australia. They announced their farewell tour in July 2007, and played their final show in Tokyo, Japan on 17 September 2007. They have since reformed to play shows sporadically since 2007.

== Biography ==
The band was formed by three Japanese students who were studying English in Perth, in 1996. After touring extensively, Mach Pelican moved to Melbourne in 1998.

In eleven years, Mach Pelican played 800 shows, touring with bands such as The Buzzcocks, Radio Birdman, Rancid, The Hard Ons, Butthole Surfers, Guitar Wolf, Supersnazz, The Donnas, You Am I, The Spazzys and The Porkers.

2006 was a significant year for the three musicians with their 10-year anniversary, release of their third studio album Radio Action on newly formed label Bop Records, touring Japan, as well as their frequent coast-to-coast shows across Australia.

Mach Pelican opened the 2006 Falls Festival in Lorne to a crowd of over 15,000 attendees. The band also played at half time in the 2007 Community Cup in St Kilda to a crowd of over 20,000 spectators.

The band's split in 2007 was a result of personal differences and immigration problems.

On 17 May 2009 they re-formed for a one-off performance at the Tote Hotel as a support for The Gimmes.

On 10 April 2011 the band reformed and played at a benefit concert for victims of the Tōhoku earthquake and tsunami at the Esplanade Hotel in St Kilda.

The band announced a one-off gig for 7 June 2019 at the Prince Hotel in St Kilda supporting Area-7 and The Porkers. In 2024, the band played a series of concerts in Australia to promote the re-release of the Radio Action album and to raise funds to support victims of the 2024 Noto earthquake. They have played regularly throughout Australia in 2025, supporting touring bands such as The D4, Guitar Wolf and The Queers.

== Band lineup ==
- Keisuke Nakamura (K-Rock) – Guitar/Vocals
- Atsushi Omori (Atsu Longrun) – Bass/Vocals
- Toshi Maeda (Toshi-8Beat) – Drums/Vocals

== TV ==
Mach Pelican's music has been played on:

- 10:30 Slot
- The Mick Molloy Show
- Rage
- Big Brother Aus Version
- Bondi Rescue (Australian TV series)

== Discography ==
=== Albums ===
- Radio Action – Bop Records (2 October 2006)
- Pulsate to the Back Beat – (October 2002)
- Mach Pelican – Shagpile/Shock Records (6 August 1999)

=== Singles and EPs ===
- "She's A Mod" Bop Records (February 2007)
- "Radio" (April 2006)
- "Airport" (August 2001)
- "Dance in Chicago"/"Gigantor" (May 1999)
- "Born to Delivery" (September 1999)
- "Blue Sky" (May 1998)
- Kim Salmon Sessions Corduroy Records (2000)

=== Split EPs ===
- Chicken & Champagne 6 track split with Guttermouth Shagpile/Shock Records (2000)
- Cake Spirit EP 4-way split: Groovie Ghoulies/The Spazzys/Dazes/Mach Pelican
- Hook up Bikini Girls 4-way split with:The Wimpy's(Japan)/Mach Pelican/Surfin' Lungs(UK)/The Manges(Italy)
- Smugglers/Mach Pelican 5 track split with Smugglers Cordrouy Records (2001)

== List of cover versions ==
- Batfoot (2016) – Dance in Chicago.
