= Forever Malcolm Young =

Studio album by Frenzal Rhomb
- Released: 14 October 2006
- Recorded: Sydney, Australia
- Genre: Punk rock Skate punk Melodic hardcore
- Length: 33:52

Frenzal Rhomb chronology
For the Term of Their Unnatural Lives (2004)	Forever Malcolm Young (2006)	Smoko at the Pet Food Factory (2011)

Forever Malcolm Young is the seventh studio album by Australian punk band Frenzal Rhomb. It was released in Australia on 14 October 2006.

The performers were Jay Whalley (credited as 'Jayden Whalley') on vocals and backing guitar, Lindsay McDougall (credited as 'The Good Doctor') on lead guitar, Gordy Foreman (credited as 'The Arsechest Formerly known as Poonce') on drums and Tom Crease (credited as 'Brigadier Tom Cruise') on bass guitar. All members provide backing vocals.

The album has a guest appearance from Whalley's wife Lauren, on the song "Please Go Over There". Lauren also appeared in "Bucket Bong" on the Sans Souci album.

The album's title is a parody of the 1984 Alphaville song "Forever Young" and AC/DC's rhythm guitarist Malcolm Young.

The first pressing of the record was sold with a DVD titled Sucking All Over the World which has live performances and behind-the-scenes footage with the band.

Album was financed by Jay's AUD 40,000 winnings from a South African casino jackpot.

== Track listing ==
No.	Title	Length
1.	"Forever Malcolm Young"	1:28
2.	"Graham 'Abo' Henry"	1:44
3.	"Johnny Ramone was in a Fucken Good Band But He was a Cunt (Gabba Gabba You Suck)"	0:31
4.	"Red Wine and Altar Boys"	1:49
5.	"Brian's Problems"	1:50
6.	"When Will I See You at the ICU"	2:06
7.	"Please Go Over There"	0:52
8.	"Fuck You and your Stupid Band"	1:41
9.	"Cruelty To Animals"	2:18
10.	"Don't Touch the Rabbit"	1:48
11.	"Medicine Balls"	2:45
12.	"Predickle Me This"	0:18
13.	"Goon Wolf"	2:16
14.	"I'm a Backwards Fucken Useless Piece of Dogshit... And I Vote"	1:46
15.	"You Need a Friend"	1:53
16.	"Holiday not Vacation"	2:29
17.	"Don't Shoot the Guests"	2:11
18.	"Caps Lock"	0:17
19.	"Find Your Own Way Home"	2:00
20.	"Wha' Happened?"	1:50

== Charts ==
Chart (2006)	Peak position
Australian Albums (ARIA)	34
