= The Anyones =

- Origin: Melbourne, Victoria, Australia
- Genre: Rock
- Years active: 1994–present
- Labels: Shock Records, Australia; Tee Pee Records, United States
- Members: Stephen Pinkerton; Malcolm Pinkerton; Nick Murphy; Adrian Gardner; Rohan Brooks
- Website: Official website

The Anyones (also known as The Everyones in the United States), are an alternative rock band from Melbourne Australia.

== History ==
The Anyones began in 1995 when brothers Stephen and Malcolm Pinkerton joined with high school friend Nick Murphy and started writing and rehearsing in Melbourne using the name "They Live" The band sought to utilize Mal's ability on the cello and recorded their first EP "Dont" in 1996 accentuating a guitar/cello blend. Mal had recorded cello parts for seminal Melbourne band The Underground Lovers which happened to include Nick Murphy's cousin Phillipa Nihill. Since Mal played both Cello and guitar, the band recruited Adrian Gardner in 1996 from the band Mineral to help with guitar when Mal played Cello. The band would eventually eliminate the cello from live performance and concentrate on a 2 to 3 guitar sound. In 1999 The Anyones would recruit Rohan Brooks from the same band to fulfill drum duties while Stephen Pinkerton transitioned from drums/vocal to a lead vocal role.

In 1996 Mal Pinkerton joined with Things of Stone and Wood as a guitarist/cellist and began an Australia wide tour. The Anyones secured a support slot, and foreshadowed a long run of stints as "opening act". Between 1997 and 1999 The Anyones recorded and released 3 EP/Singles, "The Fraidies", "Keep Walkin" and "Are you Ready?". The song "Are you Ready?" featured guitar work by Midnight Oil guitarist Martin Rotsey.

In 1998 The Anyones appeared as the "house band" for Recovery, a Saturday morning music program on the ABC.

The band performed as house band on RMITV's The Loft Live Episode 12 of Season 8 April 13, 2000 broadcast on Channel 31 Melbourne.

== Lonerider ==
In the winter of 1999 The Anyones entered the ''HotHouse" studio of former Kids in the Kitchen bassist Craig Harnath, to record their first album Lonerider. After initial recording sessions they hired Greg Wales to re-record and mix the main singles, Orange Bubblegum, Seeds and Trigger. The band released the album independently in 2000 and toured it to Sydney, Brisbane and Adelaide. The album would be nominated that year for an ARIA award for "Best Rock Album".

In 2000 they were invited on the strength of this album to play at the Livid festival in Brisbane, and the Homebake festival in Sydney. They would play the Livid festival again in 2003.

After touring Australia with the likes of The Fauves, MotorAce, Machine Gun Fellatio and Snout, The Anyones signed a multi album deal with Shock Records in 2001.

== The Anyones ==
In 2002, the band hired Paul McKercher to mix a self-titled album The Anyones. The album was released in 2003 and was promoted with an Australian tour with 78 Saab. In 2004 fellow Melbourne band Jet asked The Anyones to support them on their first headline tour of the United States, and the band secured a North American distribution deal with TeePee Records. Unfortunately for the band, they were threatened legally by Los Angeles band Anyone over copyrights to the name. The Anyones relented and were known to U.S. audiences as The Everyones.

== Post history ==
The brothers Pinkerton formed The Ronson Hangup with Ash Naylor from Even, while Nick Murphy formed a band called "Shylo". Rohan Brooks went on to form Rudely Interrupted, one of the world's most unusual rock acts currently touring.

== Discography ==
- EP
  - Don't
  - The Fraides
  - Keep Walkin
  - Are you Ready?
- Albums
  - Lonerider - 2000
  - The Anyones - 2003
- Compilations
  - Homebake 4'
  - Rock Against Howard
