= No Sleep Til Festival =

2010 music festival in Oceania

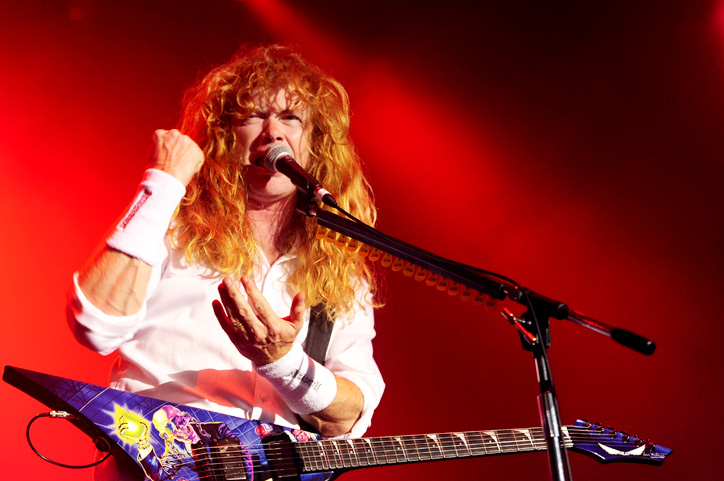
- Dave Mustaine playing with Megadeth at the festival in Perth (December 2010)
- Genre: Heavy metal
- Dates: 10 - 19 December 2010
- Locations: Australia and New Zealand

The No Sleep Til Festival was a music festival that was held across Australia and New Zealand in December 2010. The Festival was headlined by Megadeth, who played their album Rust in Peace in its entirety. Other bands included were NOFX, Dropkick Murphys, and Parkway Drive. It also featured punk band Descendents, playing their first Australian shows in their 31-year career.

== Lineup and locations ==
=== Locations ===
The Festival took place in December across 6 cities in Australia and New Zealand.

- Auckland - ASB Showgrounds (10 December)
- Perth - Arena Joondalup (12 December)
- Adelaide - Adelaide Entertainment Centre (15 December)
- Melbourne - Melbourne Showgrounds (17 December)
- Sydney - Entertainment Quarter (18 December)
- Brisbane - RNA Showgrounds (19 December)

=== Lineup ===
==== Appearing at all shows ====
- Megadeth
- NOFX
- Dropkick Murphys
- Parkway Drive
- Gwar
- Alkaline Trio
- Frenzal Rhomb
- Suicide Silence
- August Burns Red
- Katatonia
- 3 Inches of Blood
- We Came as Romans

==== Appearing in New Zealand only ====
- Antagonist A.D.
- Leeches
- Outsiders
- Shitripper

==== Appearing in Australia only ====
- Me First and the Gimme Gimmes
- House Vs. Hurricane
- Break Even
- Heroes For Hire
- Confession
- A Day To Remember (Adelaide, Melbourne, Sydney & Brisbane only)
- Atreyu (Adelaide, Melbourne, Sydney & Brisbane only)
- Descendents (Melbourne, Sydney & Brisbane only)
