= Not So Tough Now =

Studio album by Frenzal Rhomb
- Released: July 1996
- Recorded: 1995–1996
- Genre: Pop punk; punk rock; skate punk; melodic hardcore
- Length: 31:51
- Label: Shagpile/Shock (AUS); Liberation (US)
- Producer: Tony Cohen; Kalju Tonuma; Frenzal Rhomb

Frenzal Rhomb chronology
Coughing Up a Storm (1995)	Not So Tough Now (1996)	Meet the Family (1997)

Singles from Album
- 1. "Parasite" Released: 1996; 2. "Punch in the Face" Released: 1996; 3. "Disappointment" Released: 1996

Professional ratings
Review scores
Source	Rating
AllMusic	3/5 stars

Not So Tough Now is the second studio album by Australian punk rock band Frenzal Rhomb, released in July 1996 as the follow-up to their first album Coughing Up a Storm. This was the last album with Ben Costello on guitar, who was replaced by Lindsay McDougall not long after its release. The secret track at the end of the album is said to be a song about his departure.

Reviewed in Juice at the time of release, the contrast of "the ocker inflections, beery aggro and dumb-fun pretences" and Jay Whalley's "philosophy student upbringing" were noted. The supporting music was said to be more intense and dense than their previous effort, and sounding similar to NOFX.

The album originally peaked at 58 on the ARIA Charts upon release in 1996, but peaked at 34 in 2021 when the album was reissued on vinyl LP for the first time.

== Track listing ==
Not So Tough Now track listing
No.	Title	Length
1.	"**" ("International Bidding War" on US and Japanese editions)	0:27
2.	"Punch in the Face"	1:44
3.	"Disappointment"	1:37
4.	"Parasite"	1:58
5.	"Wasted"	1:39
6.	"Not So Tough Now"	1:52
7.	"Jesus"	1:39
8.	"Uncle Ken"	2:08
9.	"Not Your Thyme"	1:59
10.	"Wrong Is Right"	1:42
11.	"Human Excreta"	0:22
12.	"Urban Myth"	1:39
13.	"Pants"	0:59
14.	"You Are a Knob"	2:42
15.	"Here Today Gone Late Today"	1:58
16.	"Big Brother"	2:30
17.	"Wish You Were There"	1:51
18.	"Something Really Quiet"	0:20
19.	"Secret Track"	0:07
20.	"Another Secret Track"	0:04
21.	"Yet Another Secret Track"	0:14
22.	"More Secret Track"	0:04
23.	"Yep...Secret Track"	0:04
24.	"The Where Will It End Secret Track"	0:04
25.	"Secret Track Remix"	0:04
26.	"Secret Track Unplugged"	0:04
27.	"Secret Track...The Early Years"	0:04
28.	"The Real Secret Track"	0:04
29.	"Not Secret Anymore Secret Track"	0:04
30.	"Secret Track Live"	0:04
31.	"Are You Getting It Yet Secret Track"	0:04
32.	"Secret Track Outtakes"	0:04
33.	"Secret Track Demo"	0:04
34.	"Things You Can Do with Secret Tracks Secret Track"	0:04
35.	"The Long and Winding Secret Track"	0:04
36.	"Secret Track Dub Mix"	0:04
37.	"The Don't You Wish This Would Stop Secret Track"	0:04
38.	"Theme from Secret Track"	0:04
39.	"Theme from Secret Track Part 2"	0:04
40.	"Secret Track Featuring the London Philharmonic Orchestra"	0:04
41.	"It's Only a Joke So Far Secret Track"	0:04
42.	"Sinatra Sings Secret Track"	0:04
43.	"Secret Track Gospel Version"	0:04
44.	"Guess What...Secret Track"	0:04
45.	"The Origins of Secret Track"	0:04
46.	"Rare Secret Track"	0:04
47.	"Secret Track Radio Edit"	0:04
48.	"The Secret Track So Secret We Didn't Know It Was There Till We Counted Them Secret Track"	0:04
49.	"Maybe We Missed Some"	0:04
50.	"Ummmm...Secret Track"	0:04
51.	"The Never Ending Spiral of Secret Track"	0:04
52.	"The Fuck Off You Stupid Secret Track Secret Track"	0:04
53.	"The Biggest and Most Amazing Super Duper Extravaganza of an Extraordinarily Large Maybe Even Humongus Secret Track Secret Track and This Is the End of This Madness So Go and Read a Book"	0:04

== Charts ==
Chart performance for Not So Tough Now
Chart (2021)	Peak position
Australian Albums (ARIA)	34

== Certifications ==
Region	Certification	Certified units/sales
Australia (ARIA)	Gold	35,000^{^}
^{^} Shipments figures based on certification alone.
