= Coughing Up a Storm =

Studio album by Frenzal Rhomb
- Released: 1995; 28 October 1997 (USA)
- Recorded: Q, Darlinghurst, New South Wales
- Length: 44:34
- Label: Shock Records; Liberation Records (USA)
- Producer: David Price

Frenzal Rhomb chronology
Dick Sandwich (EP) (1993)	Coughing Up a Storm (1995)	Not So Tough Now (1996)

Alternative cover
- US cover

Coughing Up a Storm is the first album by the Australian punk band Frenzal Rhomb, released in 1995. It was re-titled Once a Jolly Swagman, Always a Jolly Swagman for its 1997 U.S. release.

== Track listing (original Australian version) ==
No.	Title	Length
1.	"Genius"	3:01
2.	"Fraud"	2:34
3.	"Run (includes a hidden track after it)"	3:11
4.	"Get Off"	2:41
5.	"Hate"	0:58
6.	"Suburban Male"	2:37
7.	"Don't Speak"	2:08
8.	"Sick and Tired"	2:10
9.	"Infotainment"	2:38
10.	"Dugadugabowbow"	2:29
11.	"No Thought"	2:17
12.	"4 Litres"	2:16
13.	"Big Paranoia"	2:00
14.	"Cones"	2:53
15.	"Kaan Kaant"	2:16
16.	"Secret Track 1"	0:54
17.	"Secret Track 2"	0:48
18.	"Secret Track 3"	6:41

The last of these hidden tracks has messages from a Frenzal answering machine tape, including several (sometimes abusive) messages from the former drummer Karl.

== Track listing ('Swagman' version) ==
No.	Title	Length
1.	"Richer Than You"	2:08
2.	"Roger"	2:03
3.	"You're O.K."	1:49
4.	"Million"	3:37
5.	"Chemotherapy"	1:52
6.	"Who Can You Trust"	1:03
7.	"Home and Away"	3:29
8.	"Genius"	3:00
9.	"Fraud"	2:33
10.	"Run"	3:10
11.	"Get Off"	2:40
12.	"Hate"	0:57
13.	"Suburban Male"	2:37
14.	"Don't Speak"	2:08
15.	"Sick and Tired"	2:09
16.	"Dugadugabowbow"	2:38
17.	"No Thought"	2:30
18.	"4 Litres"	2:14
19.	"Big Paranoia"	2:17
20.	"Cones"	2:00
21.	"Kaan Kant"	2:52
22.	"Fuck the System"	1:47
23.	"Can't Trust a Redneck"	2:14
24.	"Why Aren't You Dead?"	2:18

The published LP track listing does not mention the track "Infotainment", which is hidden between "Sick and Tired" and "Dugadugabowbow".

Tracks 1–7 are taken from the Dick Sandwich EP.
Tracks 8–21 are taken from the Coughing Up a Storm album.
Tracks 22–24 are taken from the Sorry About the Ruse EP.
