= 301Studios =

American independent record label

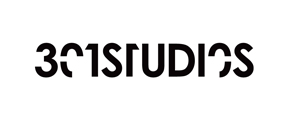
- Founded: 2003
- Founder: Joshua Lexvold
- Status: Defunct
- Distributors: Self, Symphonic Distribution
- Genre: Indie; Electronic music Hip hop
- Country of origin: U.S.
- Location: Minneapolis, Minnesota

301Studios was an American electronic music and hip-hop Independent record label based in Minneapolis, Minnesota from 2003 until 2012. It was founded by independent artist Joshua Lexvold (of KPT, DEATHDANCE and Give/Take currently). According to the label, 301Studios had taken a business model cue from successful independent labels such as Amphetamine Reptile, Ipecac Records, and Wax Trax! by focusing on artist development rather than searching out ready-made or Top 40 style radio-friendly artists.

As of 2017, Lexvold has gone on to co-found American Independent record label Give/Take with Augustus Watkins of Bijou Noir, DEATHDANCE, Tulip Tiger and co-host of the Tied To The Tracks podcast).

== Artists ==
- As the Evening Wore On
- Boxcar Strainsun
- Codes of Ashes
- Mister Thrasher
- One 2wenty One
- Rek the Heavyweight (a.k.a. Spawn formerly of Atmosphere)
- Terrell Lamont
- Thosquanta
- Word Clock

== Affiliated artists ==
(Includes artists who have had individual songs and/or projects released via 301Studios.)

- Amdeide
- Apreil Simpson
- As|Of
- Avenpitch
- Bryantist
- The BS of D
- Caustic
- Charles Sadler
- Colin Mansfield
- Courtney Hurtt
- Dave Swift
- Death By Drowning
- Delta A.M.
- Dissociate
- The Eighth
- Endless Blue
- Evarial
- Fadladder
- Fallen
- Gabrielle
- Gabber Nullification Project
- Heliosphere
- Humanoia
- Jobot
- KMA
- Little Tin Box
- Luio
- Mark Suhonen
- Max Haben
- Monz tha Illeet
- OBCT
- Tameya Clark
- TweakerRay
- Vertiform

== Discography ==
- TheFutureOfMusic I: Electronic by various artists (compilation)
- lovelife. by Thosquanta
- No One From Now On by Word Clock
- Young, Rich & Out of Control by Thosquanta/various artists (lovelife. remixes)
- The Present (Re-release) by Rek the Heavyweight
- Timeless (Re-release) by Rek the Heavyweight
- Two (Re-release) by Thosquanta
- In Vitro Mutilation by Thosquanta
- Life, Sin and God Vol. 1 by One 2wenty One
- Turn the Radio Off by Terrell Lamont
- Codes of Ashes by Codes of Ashes
- Through A Glass Darkly by Mister Thrasher
- Era Origin Decoded by Codes of Ashes/various artists (Era Origin remixes)
- A Giant Orange Sash Over the Pacific-ward Skies by Boxcar Strainsun
