= Shut Your Mouth (album) =

Studio album by Frenzal Rhomb
- Released: 20 November 2000 (Australia); 20 March 2001 (USA)
- Genre: Pop punk, punk rock, skate punk
- Length: 40:47 (US/Re-release version)
- Label: Epic, Epitaph (re-release), Fat Wreck Chords (USA)
- Producer: Keith Cleversley, Phil McKellar

Frenzal Rhomb chronology
A Man's Not a Camel (1999)	Shut Your Mouth (2000)	Sans Souci (2003)

Singles from Album
- 1. "War" Released: 2000; 2. "Coming Home" Released: 2001; 3. "Nothing's Wrong" Released: 2001

Shut Your Mouth is the fifth studio album by Australian punk rock band Frenzal Rhomb, released on 20 November 2000. Originally scheduled to be released on 6 November, it was the first and last Frenzal Rhomb album to be issued in Australia on the Epic label, which dropped the band less than six months later. It was released by Fat Wreck Chords around the world and re-issued by Epitaph/Shock Records in the band's native Australia with the U.S. track listing.

In a 2023 interview, vocalist Jay Whalley described Shut Your Mouth as being "universally regarded as our worst record". Guitarist Lindsay McDougall agreed with this assessment of the album, stating flatly "it sucked", and cited a combination of uninspired songwriting and a poor relationship with their record producer as reasons behind the album's shortcomings. McDougall and Whalley, however, both noted that the upside of the experience was the large cash advance from their label Sony, who dropped Frenzal Rhomb shortly afterwards without requiring the band to pay the money back.

== Track listing ==
=== Original Epic/Sony Records Australian version ===
No.	Title	Length
1.	"Everything's Fucked"	1:37
2.	"Runaway"	1:24
3.	"Coming Home"	2:31
4.	"Had Enough"	2:48
5.	"She's Not Happy"	2:26
6.	"War"	2:30
7.	"Dance-Ecution"	2:06
8.	"Nothing's Wrong"	2:15
9.	"Rats in the Walls"	3:38
10.	"Cheer Up"	2:25
11.	"Home Made Video"	3:00
12.	"The Best Guy"	2:47
13.	"Local Resident Failure"	3:03
14.	"My Girlfriend's a Man"	2:45
15.	"I Love Fucking Up"	2:53
16.	"Don't Let the Bastards Keep You Down"	2:27

This version of the album came in a stickered sleeve and with a multimedia component with a 'My City Of Sydney' film clip (not available anywhere else) and an interview with the band members. There is a hidden song on Track 0, "Baby Won't You Hold Me In Your Arm". A longer version of this song later appeared on the For the Term of Their Unnatural Lives compilation record.

The version of "Everything's Fucked" on this release has the term "racist cunt" censored and replaced with animal noises.

=== US and re-released Australian version ===
No.	Title	Length
1.	"Everything's Fucked"	1:40
2.	"Had Enough"	2:48
3.	"Runaway"	1:24
4.	"Coming Home"	2:30
5.	"All Hail the Weekend"	2:38
6.	"Home Made Video"	3:01
7.	"The Best Guy"	2:47
8.	"Dance-Ecution"	2:06
9.	"Nothing's Wrong"	2:15
10.	"Rats in the Walls"	3:14
11.	"Cheer Up"	2:51
12.	"Local Resident Failure"	3:03
13.	"War"	2:31
14.	"Sodom the Clown"	2:43
15.	"I Love Fucking Up"	2:52
16.	"Don't Let the Bastard's Keep You Down (alternative version)"	2:24

== Charts ==
Chart (2000)	Peak position
Australian Albums (ARIA)	31
