= Smoko at the Pet Food Factory =

2011 studio album by Frenzal Rhomb

Studio album by Frenzal Rhomb
- Released: 19 August 2011 (Australia)
- Recorded: Colorado, USA
- Genre: Pop punk Punk rock Skate punk Melodic hardcore
- Length: 26:40
- Label: Shock Records, Fat Wreck Chords
- Producer: Bill Stevenson

Frenzal Rhomb chronology
Forever Malcolm Young (2006)	Smoko at the Pet Food Factory (2011)	We Lived Like Kings (We Did Anything We Wanted) (2016)

Smoko at the Pet Food Factory is the eighth studio album by Australian punk band Frenzal Rhomb. It was released in Australia on Shock Records on 19 August 2011.

The album's title refers to singer Jay Whalley's recording studio located in the Sydney suburb of Marrickville, which is named the Pet Food Factory. (The studio's name refers to his tongue-in-cheek view that the studio does not create music of very high quality, but it does produce a large quantity of recordings.) During the demo sessions for the album, the band spent a large amount of time sitting on the balcony outside the studio having a 'smoko break', rather than actually recording the tracks. By contrast, the recording sessions with producer Bill Stevenson at The Blasting Room in Fort Collins, Colorado were tracked at a rapid pace, with multiple parts of the recording process happening simultaneously.

It was nominated at the ARIA Music Awards of 2012 for Best Hard Rock/Heavy Metal Album, but lost to DZ Deathrays for Bloodstreams.

== Track listing ==
No.	Title	Length
1.	"Bird Attack"	1:15
2.	"Mummy Doesn't Know You're a Nazi"	1:23
3.	"5000 Cigarettes"	1:40
4.	"Cockroach Light Switch"	1:26
5.	"Knuckleheads"	2:18
6.	"Just Because It's Soap Doesn't Mean It's Clean"	1:37
7.	"My Dearest Friend"	0:54
8.	"Back to the Suburbs"	2:10
9.	"Edward Sausage Fangs"	2:32
10.	"Alvarez"	1:48
11.	"Hungry Jacks Carpark"	1:48
12.	"Snouts in the Trough"	1:28
13.	"Dead Celebrity"	1:53
14.	"Metrognome"	1:22
15.	"When My Baby Smiles at Me I Go to Rehab"	1:04
16.	"The Rude Tourist"	2:11

== Charts ==
Chart (2011)	Peak position
Australian Albums (ARIA)	14
