= Meet the Family (album) =

Studio album by Frenzal Rhomb
- Released: September 1997
- Recorded: May 1997 at Festival Studios, Sydney, Australia
- Genre: Pop punk, punk rock, skate punk, melodic hardcore
- Length: 35:14
- Label: Liberation Records (USA)

Frenzal Rhomb chronology
Not So Tough Now (1996)	Meet the Family (1997)	A Man's Not a Camel (1999)

Singles from Album
- 1. "There's Your Dad" Released: 1997; 2. "Mr. Charisma" Released: 1997; 3. "Mum Changed the Locks" Released: 1998; 4. "Some of My Best Friends Are Racist" Released: 1998

Meet the Family is Frenzal Rhomb's third studio album. It was released in September 1997. The album was the first with Lindsay McDougall on guitar and the last with Nat Nykruj on drums.

== Track listing ==
No.	Title	Length
1.	"Mum Changed The Locks"	1:57
2.	"Mr. Charisma"	2:18
3.	"There's Your Dad"	2:03
4.	"Racist"	2:36
5.	"Ship of Beers"	2:15
6.	"Be Still My Beating Off"	2:20
7.	"I Hate My Brain"	2:08
8.	"The Ballad of Tim Webster"	1:55
9.	"U.S.Anus"	2:20
10.	"Constable Care"	1:39
11.	"(That's) Just Not Legal"	2:13
12.	"Hakimashita"	2:24
13.	"Genitals are Funny"	1:37
14.	"All Your Friends"	2:26
15.	"Beaded Curtains (Part Two)"	0:11
16.	"Beaded Curtains (Part Three)"	0:12
17.	"Guns Don't Kill Ducklings, Ducklings Kill Ducklings"	2:14
18.	"You Can't Move Into My House"	2:26

== Charts ==
Chart (1997–99)	Peak position
Australian Albums (ARIA)	39

== Certifications ==
Region	Certification	Certified units/sales
Australia (ARIA)	Gold	35,000^{^}
^{^} Shipments figures based on certification alone.
