= A Man's Not a Camel =

Studio album by Frenzal Rhomb
- Released: March 1999 (Aus); 8 June 1999 (US)
- Genres: Pop punk, punk rock, skate punk
- Length: 46:44
- Labels: Shagpile Records (Aus); Fat Wreck Chords (USA)
- Producer: Eddie Ashworth

Frenzal Rhomb chronology
Meet the Family (1997)	A Man's Not a Camel (1999)	Shut Your Mouth (2000)

Singles from A Man's Not a Camel
- 1. "We're Going Out Tonight" Released: 1999; 2. "You Are Not My Friend" Released: 1999; 3. "Never Had So Much Fun" Released: 1999; 4. "I Miss My Lung" Released: 1999

Professional ratings
Review scores
Source	Rating
Allmusic	link

A Man's Not a Camel is Frenzal Rhomb's fourth studio album, released in March 1999. The singles "You are Not My Friend", "Never Had So Much Fun" and "We're Going Out Tonight" all received considerable play-time on radio and television music video programmes, boosting the band's reputation. In July 2011, the album was voted 92nd in Triple J's Hottest 100 Australian Albums of All Time.

== Track listing (original Australian version) ==
No.	Title	Length
1.	"Never Had So Much Fun"	2:03
2.	"You Are Not My Friend"	3:29
3.	"It's Up To You"	1:47
4.	"I Know Everything About Everything"	2:19
5.	"I Miss My Lung"	3:25
6.	"We're Going Out Tonight"	2:17
7.	"Let's Drink a Beer"	3:14
8.	"I Know Why Dinosaurs Became Extinct"	0:26
9.	"I Don't Need Your Loving"	3:28
10.	"Self Destructor"	2:55
11.	"Go Frenzal Go"	2:45
12.	"Do You Wanna Fight Me?"	3:02
13.	"Methadone"	2:34
14.	"Don't Talk to Me"	2:38
15.	"Summer's Here" (features a secret track "I Don't Wanna Go To Work Today" hidden after it)	10:22

== Track listing (USA Fat Wreck Chords version) ==
No.	Title	Length
1.	"Never Had So Much Fun"	2:00
2.	"You Are Not My Friend"	3:26
3.	"It's Up To You"	1:46
4.	"I Know Everything About Everything"	2:18
5.	"I Miss My Lung"	3:25
6.	"We're Going Out Tonight"	2:17
7.	"Let's Drink a Beer"	3:14
8.	"I Know Why Dinosaurs Became Extinct…"	0:26
9.	"I Don't Need Your Loving"	3:27
10.	"Self Destructor"	2:55
11.	"I'm The Problem With Society"	2:34
12.	"Do You Wanna Fight Me?"	3:00
13.	"Methadone"	2:34
14.	"Writing's on the Wall"	2:24
15.	"Summer's Here (includes the track Go Frenzal Go as the hidden track on this version)"	8:12

== Charts ==
Chart (1999)	Peak position
Australian Albums (ARIA)	11

== Certifications ==
Region	Certification	Certified units/sales
Australia (ARIA)	Gold	35,000^{^}
^{^} Shipments figures based on certification alone.
