= Sans Souci (album) =

Studio album by Frenzal Rhomb
- Released: April 2003
- Recorded: September–December 2002
- Genres: Pop punk, punk rock, skate punk, melodic hardcore
- Length: 35:17
- Labels: Epitaph, Fat Wreck Chords
- Producers: Eddie Ashworth & Frenzal Rhomb

Frenzal Rhomb chronology
Shut Your Mouth (2000)	Sans Souci (2003)	For the Term of Their Unnatural Lives (2004)

Professional ratings
Review scores
Source	Rating
Allmusic	link
Alternative Press	3/5

Sans Souci is the sixth studio album by Australian punk band Frenzal Rhomb. It was released by Epitaph Records in Australia in April 2003 and Fat Wreck Chords elsewhere around the world.

== Recording ==
Bassist Tom Crease said, "We had an eight track at Jay's house and just started recording things on it every day and every night. We'd get basic guitar tracks down for four or five songs, go to the rehearsal room and Gordy would put down drum tracks. Then we'd record bass, guitar and vocals, until we had a CD of five or six songs together. We would churn out a CD every three to four weeks for a couple of months."

== Track listing ==
No.	Title	Length
1.	"Stand Up & Be Cunted"	0:52
2.	"Russell Crowe's Band"	1:12
3.	"Punisher"	3:32
4.	"Ballchef"	1:19
5.	"Bucket Bong"	2:32
6.	"Looking Good"	2:36
7.	"Greyhound"	1:43
8.	"Lead Poisoned Jean"	2:10
9.	"Who'd Be a Cop?"	2:31
10.	"White World"	2:01
11.	"Cocksucker"	3:00
12.	"World's Fuckedest Cunt"	2:31
13.	"60, Beautiful & Mine"	2:53
14.	"I Went Out With a Hippy and Now I Love Everyone Except For Her"	2:58
15.	"All the Kids are Having Kids"	1:51
16.	"You'll Go to Jail"	1:36

This album has many samples from the 2000 documentary film Cunnamulla about the outback town of Cunnamulla, Queensland.

The album's cover artwork features a photograph of drummer Gordy Forman's father Jimmy, and the booklet features other photos of Forman's family from the 1970s and 80s.

Initial pressings of the Australian album came with a bonus DVD with some live footage and three film clips.

An alternative version of "Cocksucker" appears on the Uncontrollable Fatulence compilation released in 2002.

== Charts ==
Chart (2003)	Peak position
Australian Albums (ARIA)	42
