= Jay and the Doctor =

Australian radio duo

Jay and the Doctor are the on-air names of Australian radio duo Jason Whalley and Lindsay McDougall, on radio station Triple J.

Best known as members of punk band Frenzal Rhomb, they performed occasional late-night shifts on Triple J until 2004. They temporarily replaced Chris Taylor and Craig Reucassel for six weeks in late 2004 while The Chaser Decides covered the federal election.

On 26 November 2004, Jay and the Doctor were announced as the hosts of the Breakfast Show in 2005. The announcement was highly built up by incumbent hosts Adam & Wil. Prior to their employment at the station, their music was banned for a time by Triple J after Frenzal Rhomb criticised the station on air for playing the "same 40 songs".

Myf Warhurst joined Jay and the Doctor on breakfast in January 2007, to form Myf, Jay and the Doctor. Warhurst announced on 10 October 2007 that she would leave Triple J and co-host a new show with comedian Peter Helliar for Triple M Melbourne.

Jason "Jay" Whalley's last broadcast was on Friday, 23 November 2007. The Doctor continued to host the weekday breakfast shift program with Robbie Buck and Marieke Hardy Until the end of 2009. He then hosted the afternoon drive program from 3-5:30pm weekdays replacing Scott Dooley until late 2014.

== Segments ==
Some of their on-air antics include the following segments:

- Happy Monday - Jay and The Doctor try to brighten up Monday mornings by playing an infuriating song repeatedly. On 29 August 2005, they initiated "The Happiest Monday Ever" prior to which they encouraged listeners to falsely appear sick in order to take the day off work and spend the morning listening to them broadcast from Jason's bed and other parts of his house. Special guests included "The Iron Deficient Chef" Suzy Spoon preparing a vegan breakfast.
- Agony Cox - An agony aunt section featuring Andrew Cox of the popular Melbourne indie band The Fauves, who helps give advice to selected listeners that call in with a personal problem that needs addressing.
- Dreamweaver- Listeners call up and describe recent dreams to Jason and he interprets them. Jason often parodies cold reading. At some point the segment became speedweaver, where Jason gives a short one or two sentence response before quickly moving onto the next caller. Then it became screamweaver, where Jason screams his response.
- The Friday F***wit- Jay and the doctor nominate a person, feeling, object or incident in the news that week who they think deserves particular recognition. To play up the humour, it is not always obvious and the reasoning may be quite strange. The award can not be received twice by the same person.
- Under the weather sessions- A well-known musician will teach Jay and the Doctor how to play one of their songs. Originally this was to play in the background of one of the weather readings, hence the name. Now the weather is often sung by the guest.

== Skits ==
Like several other Triple J programs with comedic content, Jay and the Doctor produce short skits that are played during their program as well as at other times of day.

=== Series ===
- Battalion 666- An increasingly bizarre radio serial about "HMS Beelzebub", a fictitious ship of the Royal Navy staffed entirely of satanists. Most of the crew are also well-known celebrities. Their dialogue is made up of either (bad) impersonations from Jay or the Doctor (some examples are New Zealand Prime Minister Helen Clark, Corey Taylor from Slipknot, The Chemical Brothers and even fellow Triple J hosts John Safran and sometimes, Craig Reucassel), or repetitive samples of the celebrity's voice (some examples are Russell Crowe/"Maximus" and Billy Corgan and Jacki O stunt bum - reference to a rival broadcaster Jackie "O" (O'Neil)). The only regular character that is not a famous celebrity is "The Cook". Jay and the Doctor also appeared as themselves in the episode "Did I Mention We Won A Logie?". The series originated from the story that the Royal Navy would allow practising satanist crew members on board its ships and first aired during Jay and the Doctor's temporary Saturday afternoon program.
- Space Goat- A serial involving a goat in outer space. Parodies early-era sci-fi radio serials, by having a large starting and ending narration, with the 'actual' episode consisting of a single audio clip of a goat, roughly a second long. The goat sound never changes.
- Time Maniac- A serial involving an adventurer (played by fellow Triple J presenter Robbie Buck) who, due to a scientific mishap, perpetually travels to different time periods every five seconds. Every episode involves Time Maniac arriving at a turning point in history, but being thrown back through time just as he tries to mention future events.
- 7:30 Resort- A send-up of typically biased "on-the-scene" news reporting. This involves head anchor "Jason Jay" Whalley delivering the headlines poolside at a tropical resort, while on-the-scene reporter "Radios" The Doctor becomes involved with the situation in a comic manner.
- Musical Challenge- Claiming that they themselves prove that musicians should not talk, Jay and the Doctor propose an alternative method for interviewing musicians; by having them respond with their instruments.
- Gamblers Anonymous Help Line- A parody of a gamblers help line. Jason bullies the desperate callers into continuing gambling to win their money back.
- Flack- A parody of Triple J's current affairs program, Hack.
- Steve Tankerfield's Trafficking Report- A parody of traffic reports given from a helicopter, but reporting on drug trafficking.
- Swamp Donkey- A serial spun off from Space Goat that allows listeners to submit their own scripts using a predefined sound.

=== One-offs ===
- Interview and Interrogation - Following allegations by Mamdouh Habib of mistreatment while he was imprisoned in Guantanamo Bay, certain government ministers and intelligence officials were contradicting each other over whether he was interviewed or interrogated. Jay and the Doctor apply the same level of ambiguity to interviewing musical guests.
- Caring Through Swearing - Jay and the Doctor claim it is better to swear at a child than to hit them.
- Asia vs The rest of the world - Following the "Asia vs The rest of the world" charity cricket match, Jay and the Doctor propose a follow-up; "Asia vs The rest of the world: The War!" In the interest of humanity and charity.
- Tsuna-you Tsuna-me - A song by Jay and the Doctor about donations made to help the victims of the 2004 Indian Ocean earthquake, claiming we do it "so we can feel good about ourselves". This song caused some controversy, at least on conservative talk-back radio stations .
