= Frenzal Rhomb =

Australian punk rock band

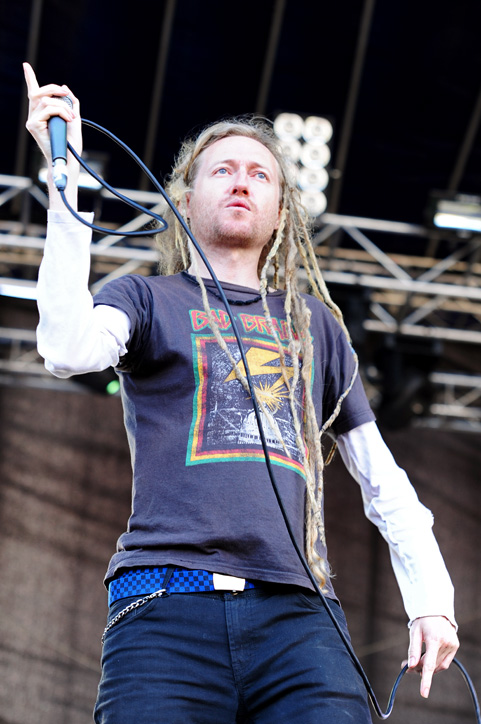
- Jason Whalley performing live on 12 December 2010

Background information
- Origin: Sydney, Australia
- Genres: Punk rock, skate punk, melodic hardcore
- Years active: 1992–present
- Labels: How Much Did I Fucking Pay for This; Shock; Shagpile; Fat Wreck Chords; Liberation; Epic; Sony; Epitaph
- Spinoffs: The Self Righteous Brothers; Chinese Burns Unit; The Neptune Power Federation
- Members: Jason Whalley; Lindsay McDougall; Gordy Forman; Michael Dallinger
- Past members: Tom Crease; Lex Feltham; Ben Costello; Bruce Braybrooke; Karl Perske; Nat Nykyruj

Frenzal Rhomb are an Australian punk rock band that formed in 1992 in Sydney. The band's current lineup consists of lead vocalist Jason "Jay" Whalley, guitarist Lindsay "The Doctor" McDougall, drummer Gordon "Gordy" Forman, and bassist Michael "Dal" Dallinger. Though the band's mainstream success has been minimal, four of the group's albums have entered the top 20 on the ARIA Albums Chart: A Man's Not a Camel (1999), Smoko at the Pet Food Factory (2011), Hi-Vis High Tea (2017) and The Cup of Pestilence (2023). Hi-Vis High Tea charted the highest of these, peaking at number nine in the charts. The group has also supported Australian tours by American punk bands such as The Offspring, Bad Religion, NOFX, The Lawrence Arms and Blink-182. Frenzal Rhomb have also toured in the United States, United Kingdom, Canada, Japan, South Africa and Taiwan. The band has undergone several line-up changes, with lead vocalist Jason Whalley serving as the band's sole constant member.

== History ==
=== 1992–1995: Formation to Coughing Up a Storm ===
Frenzal Rhomb formed in 1992 in the Sydney suburb of Newtown with Alexis 'Lex' Feltham on bass guitar and Jason 'Jay' Whalley on vocals. Feltham and Whalley had been school mates at St Ives High School in St Ives. Whalley had commenced a Bachelor of Arts course in philosophy at Sydney University when he formed Frenzal Rhomb as a punk rock band. The band was formed to take part in a battle of the bands and at that stage was not seen as a permanent project. The name came from Fresnel rhomb, which is a prism-like device invented by the 19th century French engineer Augustin-Jean Fresnel.

Because we thought we were hilarious and then we entered ourselves into the band competition at Sydney University and I'm pretty sure they said "don't come in here with your stupid band names, like if you have a band, have a proper name and you need it by this afternoon", and so were like frantically sort of looking around for things and we opened up one of Ben's textbooks and there was this French physicist.

— Jason Whalley, J Files on Double J Podcast (30 Jun 2022)

Yeah, and we sort of mangled his name and came up with a Frenzal Rhomb. I think his name was Frenel. It's like spelled Fresnel. Yeah, and he had this thing called the Fresnel rhomb and yeah, we sort of butchered it and came up with Frenzal Rhomb.

— Ben Costello, J Files on Double J Podcast (30 Jun 2022)

By 1993, the group's line-up was Feltham, Whalley, Ben Costello on guitar and Karl Perske on drums. They played at the Sydney iteration of the Big Day Out in January.

In March 1994, the band issued a seven-track EP, Dick Sandwich. Its cover had "a graphic drawing of the offending flaccid appendage draped over a sesame seed bun with lashings of bloody sauce." Posters with a similar image that advertised the group had them banned at some venues. National youth radio station Triple J criticised the group as being immature and told them to "grow up". The EP was described as having "good songs but it sounds like it was recorded under a doona" and had the group banned from some radio stations and retail outlets. One of its tracks, "I Wish I Was as Credible as Roger Climpson" (aka "Roger"), attracted attention of its subject, Roger Climpson – a Seven News anchor on TV – who posed with the group for a photo. The E.P also features fan favourites "Chemotherapy", and a cover of the TV series theme "Home And Away". The E.P featured an alternate cover depicting rabbits on the flipside of the liftout to appease record stores or people who may have been offended by the original artwork. In October of that year, they released a single, "Sorry About the Ruse", on their own label, How Much Did I Fucking Pay For This Records? The group were the local support act on the Australian leg of separate tours by United States punk rockers Bad Religion, The Offspring, and Blink-182.

In March 1995, Frenzal Rhomb released their first studio album, Coughing Up a Storm, on Shock Records' sub-label Shagpile Records. Perske was replaced by Nat Nykyruj on drums before the album appeared. The album features live fan favourite "Genius". In October 1997, it was retitled Once a Jolly Swagman Always a Jolly Swagman and issued with additional tracks by the US label Liberation Records. In mid-1995, the group supported NOFX on their national tour. Fat Mike, a member of NOFX, was also the owner of Fat Wreck Chords, and he signed the band to his label, which released the 4 Litres EP in the US.

=== 1996–2000: Not So Tough Now to A Man's Not a Camel ===
In July 1996, Frenzal Rhomb released their second album, Not So Tough Now, which was produced by Tony Cohen (Nick Cave and the Bad Seeds, TISM, Dave Graney), Kalju Tonuma (Nick Barker, The Mavis's) and Frenzal Rhomb. Just after its appearance, Costello was replaced by Lindsay McDougall on lead guitar and backing vocals – Costello left to attend university and become an animal rights activist. In November, the group issued a CD EP, Punch in the Face and, in January 1997, performed at Big Day Out. Late that year they toured the US supporting Blink-182.

In September 1997, their third LP, Meet the Family, was released, which reached the top 40 on the ARIA Albums Chart and became their first certified gold album by ARIA. It spawned three singles, "Mr Charisma" (June), "There's Your Dad" (September), and "Mum Changed the Locks" (April 1998). In April, Gordon "Gordy" Forman replaced Nykyruj on drums, and they toured Australia with US ska band Blue Meanies. Frenzal Rhomb were the head-liners for the Australian leg of the 1998 Vans Warped Tour and they were recruited for the US edition. A 1998 version of Meet the Family contained a bonus disc, Mongrel, that was recorded live on this US leg.

In March 1999, they released their next album, A Man's Not a Camel, which was produced by Eddie Ashworth and was supported by a nationwide tour. As from November 2011, it remains Frenzal Rhomb's highest-charting album, reaching No. 11. It spawned their highest-charting single, "You Are Not My Friend" (August), which reached No. 49. Allmusic's album reviewer Mike DaRonco felt "the first two songs are great in that catchy, playful pop-punk sort of way, but the rest ... fall under the trap of having all their tracks sounding like one big, long song". The album also features fan favourites "We're Going Out Tonight" and "Never Had So Much Fun".

At the ARIA Music Awards of 1999 in October, the group performed "Never Had So Much Fun". In 2019 Dan Condon of Double J described this as one of "7 great performances from the history of the ARIA Awards." According to the band's website, US gigs were dropped after Whalley suffered a heart attack in late 1999 and the group spent the first few months of 2000 inactive. Whalley later denied that he had had a heart attack with "a lot of things on our Web site are greatly exaggerated. There was also a thing about my having trench rot, the World War I disease, but that's not true either".

=== 2000–2003: Shut Your Mouth to Sans Souci ===
In November 2000, Frenzal Rhomb returned with the album Shut Your Mouth, released on Epic Records in Australia, an offshoot of Sony. RockZone's Samuel Barker liked some tracks as "a fine template for a pop punk album" however "the majority just falls into the same formula of most punk today. It's not bad, just overplayed". The album peaked in the top 40. After six months, Sony dropped the band in mid-2001 and they signed with Epitaph Records in Australia.

In April 2002, Feltham left the group, which provided many stories about why he left, including one that he was fired after thinking that the group should incorporate synth and keyboard work. The last song he recorded with the band was a cover of Midnight Oil's "The Dead Heart" for the 2001 tribute album Power & The Passion: A Tribute to Midnight Oil. After holding auditions in Sydney, Tom Crease was announced as the new bass guitarist.

In April 2003, the band released Sans Souci, which appeared in the top 50. Jo-Ann Greene of Allmusic liked the group's outlook: "they're not bitter, just snotty about it all, as all good punks should be. And Rhomb are four of the best ... their latest set of frenzied, funny, pitiless attacks upon an uncaring planet." The initial version of the album included a bonus DVD of five tracks with live footage and music videos.

=== 2004: Political protest, Jackie O ===
During 2003, Frenzal Rhomb's McDougall organised Rock Against Howard, a compilation album, by various Australian musicians as a protest against incumbent Prime Minister John Howard's government. It was released in August 2004, before the October federal election, when Howard's coalition was re-elected.

In July 2004, radio station 2Day FM presenter Jackie O was to MC at the Bassinthegrass festival in Darwin. Jackie allegedly arrived late, causing Frenzal Rhomb to cut their setlist short by several songs. She attempted to speak with the audience. In protest, McDougall began playing AC/DC's "Thunderstruck" over her voice. Jackie was upset that she was unable to finish her announcement to the audience. Whalley later accused her and other music industry personalities of pushing original Australian bands aside to make way for short-term marketable acts such as Australian Idol and Popstars contestants.

Jackie and her co-presenter, Kyle Sandilands, called Whalley on air during their next breakfast show. Whalley apologised for offending Jackie, but stood by his claims regarding the music industry. The conversation became heated as Sandilands told Whalley "Your song's being played on this network or the Triple M network... it's just not going to happen now"; to which Whalley argued that Frenzal Rhomb were almost never played on the Austereo network anyway. During the conversation, Sandilands told Whalley that he was bitter and sad. When Whalley pointed out that Sandilands is in a position to promote new Australian music but doesn't, Sandilands countered that Frenzal Rhomb is not played on the network "because it's pretty much shit". While Sandilands agreed that shows like Popstars and Australian Idol are interested in making "a quick buck", he also asserted that he doesn't "care about Australian Idol or Popstars".

Sandilands argued that Whalley should not "pick fights with people that are female in the Northern Territory". Sandilands asserted that if he himself were present, "it would have been on for young and old". Whalley argued that gender was irrelevant to the issue, and in response to Sandilands' threat of violence asked Jackie if she was aware that her security guard had threatened a band technician with violence. Sandilands said he endorsed the threat of violence. Sandilands argued to Whalley that he has to "get over it" when Whalley recommended that radio DJs should promote original Australian music. In reply, Whalley insinuated that Frenzal Rhomb, and bands in general, suffer from a lack of support because they are not "putting [their] stuff in front of the right people".

ABC Television's Media Watch covered the exchange and presenter David Marr raised concerns about the interview: "Kyle and Jackie O are also part of a new generation of radio thugs". Patrick Joyce, general manager of Austereo in Sydney, responded to Sandilands' threats of black listing and violence, "Music content is decided by the programming directors based on research of the market... Austereo does not approve of threats being made to anyone... We have fully canvassed these issues with Kyle".

=== 2005–2009: Jay and the Doctor and Forever Malcolm Young ===
Frenzal Rhomb's Whalley and McDougall worked as Jay and the Doctor on Triple J's breakfast show from January 2005 through to November 2007. Prior to their employment at Triple J, the group's music had been banned after they had earlier criticised the station on air for playing the "same 40 songs". In 2004, they were asked to perform occasional late night shifts and request segments, which developed into the breakfast show slot. Their format includes banter where they provide "quips, one-liners, slagging off each other, other bands, other breakfast announcers, listeners, Triple J, Australian Idol and St Ives. It's verbal ping pong but more discursive."

The band released Forever Malcolm Young in October 2006 – the title is a conflated reference to the 1984 Alphaville song "Forever Young" and the name of AC/DC's guitarist, Malcolm Young – which peaked in the top 40. It provided a minor radio hit with the title track. Some controversy was expressed over the profanity in the title and lyrics of "Johnny Ramone was in a Fucking Good Band, but He Was a Cunt" (see Johnny Ramone, Ramones). Whalley's attitude to profanity and obscenity is "I often get amazed how offended people get by language, especially in Australia when its nothing you wouldn't hear in your local office or schoolyard. But we do make a point of shaking things up". Australian rock music journalist Ed Nimmervoll described them "[their] history is littered with legendary stories, perhaps true, perhaps exaggerations, but stories which fuel and match their song and album titles. Their songs are often profane, likely to poke fun at someone including themselves, hint at a social conscience, and inside all the tough talk and body jokes be hopelessly romantic."

National touring followed the album's release, along with the announcement that from November 2007 Whalley would be leaving both Frenzal Rhomb and his job at Triple J to go on a world trip with his girlfriend. Some later copies of Forever Malcolm Young contained a bonus DVD covering the band's tours from 2002 up until 2005. It is titled Sucking All Over the World. Gordy Forman plays in the Melbourne hardcore band Mindsnare. McDougall continued as The Doctor at Triple J, initially with Robbie Buck and Marieke Hardy; and, from January 2010, he has hosted the afternoon show Drive with The Doctor. By April 2009, Frenzal Rhomb were performing The Boys Are Back in Town tour with 1990s punk group Nancy Vandal as their support act.

=== 2010–2017: Smoko at the Pet Food Factory and We Lived Like Kings... ===
In December 2010, Frenzal Rhomb embarked on the No Sleep Til Festival which featured punk and metal bands: Megadeth, Descendents, NOFX, Gwar and Dropkick Murphys. Frenzal Rhomb played a new song entitled "Bird Attack". In Brisbane, on the last stop of the tour, Whalley and Crease joined Descendents on-stage with other bands' singers – Al Barr (Dropkick Murphys), Fat Mike (NOFX), Matt Skiba and Derek Grant (Alkaline Trio), and Jason Allen (Descendents' road manager) – to perform "Everything Sux".

Frenzal Rhomb recorded their next album, Smoko at the Pet Food Factory in Colorado with Bill Stevenson (drummer for Descendents) producing. It was released on 19 August 2011 on Shock Records, which peaked at No. 14. The group toured Australia with Teenage Bottlerocket in September in support of the album.

In June 2012, the album 'Not So Tough Now' was certified gold by the Australia Record Industry Association, 16 years after its release.

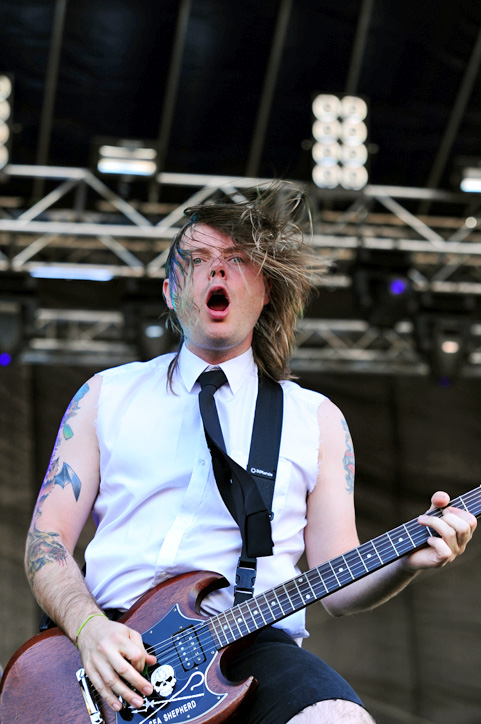
Lindsay McDougall on lead guitar at No Sleep Til Festival, December 2010.

Lead singer Jay Whalley announced on 26 February 2013 that the group was forced to cancel its recent tour after surgeons discovered and removed a pig tapeworm egg from his brain.

Drummer Gordy Forman broke his arm in multiple places after stage diving during a performance in Perth in 2015 and spent about 18 months recovering. The band continued to play live with Kye Smith (of Local Resident Failure) filling in on drums. Smith had previously paid tribute to Frenzal Rhomb as part of his "5 Minute Drum Chronology" series on YouTube.

To celebrate the band's 25th anniversary Frenzal Rhomb toured Australia in 2016. Fans were offered the opportunity to select songs in the set list by voting for their favourite songs on the band's Facebook page. The band also released a best-of album, entitled We Lived Like Kings, We Did Anything We Wanted, on 19 August.

=== 2017–2023: Hi-Vis High Tea ===
Frenzal Rhomb's ninth studio album, Hi-Vis High Tea, was released on 26 May 2017 on CD, LP (vinyl) and digital download. It was once again recorded in The Blasting Room by Bill Stevenson. The album's first single, "Cunt Act," was released on the same day; as well as a national run of dates with Totally Unicorn.

After 17 years, Tom Crease departed the band in mid-2019 due to ongoing hearing problems. He was replaced by Michael "Dal" Dallinger, formerly of Newcastle punk band Local Resident Failure – coincidentally, a band named after a Frenzal Rhomb song. The band then performed at the 2020 Hotter Than Hell festival, which ended up being their last shows for over a year due to the COVID-19 pandemic. The band made their live return at Melbourne's 170 Russell on April 23, 2021. A national tour followed in May, including performances at the festivals Full Tilt and Spring Loaded.

=== 2023–present: The Cup of Pestilence ===
In late 2022, the band confirmed that they were at work on an album. On 15 February 2023, the band announced their tenth studio album, The Cup of Pestilence, which was released on 7 April. The announcement came with the release of its opening track and lead single, "Where Drug Dealers Take Their Kids". On 22 March 2023, Frenzal Rhomb released their second and last song from the album and single, "Thought It Was Yoga But It Was Ketamine".

== Band members ==
Current members

- Jason "Jay" Whalley – lead vocals (1992–present)
- Lindsay "The Doctor" McDougall – guitar, backing vocals (1996–present)
- Gordon "Gordy" Forman – drums (1998–present)
- Michael "Dal" Dallinger (AKA Dal Failure) – bass, backing vocals (2019–present)

Former members

- Alexis "Lex" Feltham – bass, backing vocals (1992–2002)
- Ben Costello – guitar (1992–1996)
- Bruce Braybrooke – drums (1992–1993)
- Karl Perske – drums (1993–1995)
- Nat Nykyruj – drums (1995–1998)
- Tom Crease – bass, backing vocals (2002–2019)

Former touring musicians

- Kye Smith – drums (2015–2016, occasional fill-in gigs)

== Discography ==
Studio albums

- Coughing Up a Storm (1995)
- Not So Tough Now (1996)
- Meet the Family (1997)
- A Man's Not a Camel (1999)
- Shut Your Mouth (2000)
- Sans Souci (2003)
- Forever Malcolm Young (2006)
- Smoko at the Pet Food Factory (2011)
- Hi-Vis High Tea (2017)
- The Cup of Pestilence (2023)

== Awards and nominations ==
=== ARIA Music Awards ===
The ARIA Music Awards is an annual awards ceremony that recognises excellence, innovation, and achievement across all genres of Australian music. They commenced in 1987.

Year	Nominee / work	Award	Result	Ref.
1999	"You Are Not My Friend"	Breakthrough Artist – Single	Nominated	
1999	A Man's Not a Camel	Best Rock Album	Nominated	
2000	"Never Had So Much Fun"	Best Pop Release	Nominated	
