= WA Media Awards =

- Awarded for: Outstanding work by Western Australian media workers
- Presented by: Western Australian Journalists Association
- First award: 1987
- Website: https://www.meaa.org/meaa-media/state-media-awards/wa-media-awards/

The WA Media Awards are presented annually by the Western Australian Journalists Association.

The awards recognise outstanding work by Western Australian reporters, photographers, graphic designers, cartoonists, sub-editors, television camera people and other media workers.

The awards are generally judged by senior media workers, as well as academics, former media workers, judges, businesspeople and others. The qualifying period is usually the 12 months from the beginning of September to the end of August. The 2012 awards were presented at the Hyatt Regency Hotel on 3 November 2012 by Craig Smart from Channel 10 and Emmy Kubainski from Channel 7. The 2012 awards were hosted by The West Australian media workers Kate Ferguson and Daniel Hatch. The 2011 awards were presented by Matt Tinney and Narelda Jacobs at the Pan Pacific Hotel in Perth on 5 November 2011.

The most prestigious individual awards are the Daily News Centenary Prize (informally known as the Gold Award or the WA Journalist of the Year), which, like the Gold Walkley, is presented to the stand-out winner of all the awards; the Arthur Lovekin Prize in Journalism; and the Clarion Prize, which is awarded for outstanding achievement by a member of the Australian Journalists Section of the WA Branch of the MEAA.

Journalists to have been highly successful have been Steve Pennells (19 awards), Gary Adshead (19), Paige Taylor (17), John Flint (17), Sean Cowan (14), and Colleen Egan (9). Pennells, Egan and Flint have also won Walkley Awards.

Adshead has won four WA Journalist of the Year awards and Cowan three, though they shared two of those, while Egan and Victoria Laurie have each won two, one of which was shared.

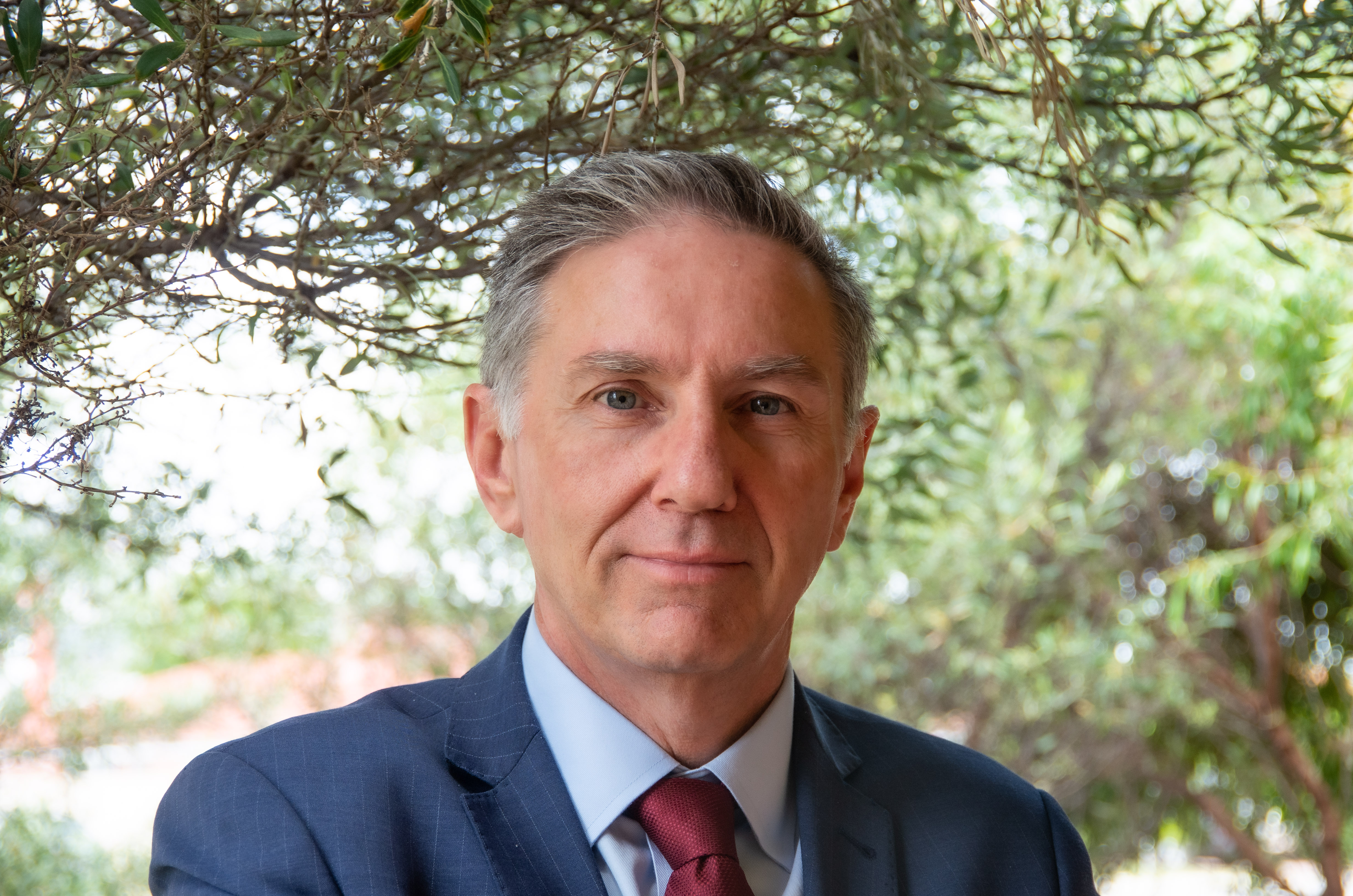
Gary Adshead, November 2021

== 1987 winners ==
- Centenary Prize: Martin Saxon, Sydney Morning Herald
- PPC Prize: Mark Thornton, The West Australian.
- PPC Suburban: Cathy Munro, Post Newspapers
- Radio: Guy Houston, ABC
- Sports/Gilmour: Robert Messenger, Daily News
- Eaves (best cadet): too few entries
- Beck prize for government reporting: too few entries
- TV Prize: too few entries
- Clarion Prize: Robert Millhouse

== 1988 winners ==
- Daily News Centenary Prize: Vicki Laurie, ABC TV's 7.30 Report
- Print Prize: Martin Saxon, Daily News
- TV Prize: Vicki Laurie, ABC TV's 7.30 Report Television Journalism Prize
- Beck Prize: Alan Atkinson, ABC TV's 7.30 Report
- Gilmour Prize: John McGrath, The West Australian
- Eaves-Prior Prize: Mara Pritchard, The West Australian
- PPC Prize: Alan Atkinson, ABC TV's 7.30 Report
- PPC Country: Anne Osbourne, Sound Telegraph
- Lovekin Prize: Martin Saxon
- Clarion Prize: Bob Duffield

== 1989 winners ==
- TV Prize: Alison Fan, Channel 7
- Radio Prize: Katy Cronin, ABC
- Print Prize: Cyril Ayris, The West Australian
- Eaves Prior: Jody Lennon, Post Newspapers
- Beck Prize: Alan Atkinson, ABC
- Gilmour Prize: Robbie Burns, Daily News
- Daily News Centenary Prize: Alison Fan, Channel 7
- Lovekin Prize: Robyn Cash.
- PPC Prize: Cyril Ayris
- PPC Country: Phil Clayton, Geraldton Guardian
- PPC Suburban: Maureen Eppen, Sound Telegraph
- Clarion: Jenni Garrigan, The Sunday Times

== 1990 winners ==
- TV Prize: Rex Haw, Channel 9
- TV Camera Prize: Not awarded
- Radio Prize: Not awarded
- Print Prize: Cyril Ayris and Steven Loxley, The West Australian
- Photographic Prize: Ross Swanborough, Daily News
- Art Prize: Don Lindsay, The West Australian
- Eaves Prior: Jos Valdman, The West Australian
- Beck Prize: Steven Loxley
- Gilmour Prize: Kim Hagdorn
- Daily News Centenary Prize: Cyril Ayris and Steven Loxley, The West Australian
- Lovekin Prize: Cyril Ayris.
- PPC Prize: Duncan Graham, freelance
- PPC Country: Patricia Fraser, Great Southern Herald
- PPC Suburban: Wendy Evans, Canning-Melville Times
- Clarion: Jim Magnus

== 1991 winners ==
- Beck Prize for government reporting: Martin Saxon
- Best news photograph: Neil Eliot
- Best print report: John McGlue
- Best radio report: Andrew Porter
- Best news item by a cadet: Wendy Pryer
- Arts Prize: Victoria Laurie
- Daily News Centenary Prize: John McGlue
- PPC Prize: Martin Saxon
- PPC Suburban: George Williams
- Lovekin Award: Mike van Niekirk
- Clarion Prize: Anne Merkel

== 1992 winners ==
- TV Prize: Not awarded
- TV Camera Prize: Not awarded
- Radio Prize: Not awarded
- Print Prize: Martin Saxon, The Sunday Times
- Best News Picture: Mirek Zabiello, Community Newspaper Group
- Graphics Award: Dean Alston, The West Australian
- Feature Prize: Duncan Graham, The West Australian
- Premier's Art Prize: Victoria Laurie, The Bulletin.
- Eaves Prior Prize: Michael Casey, The West Australian
- Beck Prize: Brendan Nicholson, The West Australian
- Gilmour Prize: Ken Casellas, The West Australian
- Daily News Centenary Prize: Brendan Nicholson, The West Australian
- Lovekin Prize: Mark Thornton, The West Australian
- PPC Prize: Margot Lang, The West Australian
- PPC Country: Patricia Fraser, Great Southern Herald
- PPC Suburban: Kaye Hawley, Comment News
- Clarion Prize: Mark Thornton

== 1993 winners ==
- Best Newcomer Prize: Roger Martin, The West Australian
- Clarion Award: Michael Sinclair-Jones, The West Australian
- Daily News Centenary Prize: Frazer Guild, The Sunday Times
- Feature Prize: Victoria Laurie, freelance
- Photographic Prize: Stephen Ferrier, The West Australian
- Print News Prize: Frazer Guild, The Sunday Times
- Sports Prize: Paul Haynes, Albany Advertiser
- TV Camera Prize: Alan Griffiths, GWN
- Arthur Lovekin Prize in Journalism: Brendan Nicholson, The West Australian

== 1994 winners ==
- Best Newcomer Prize: Alva McNicol, Post Newspapers
- Clarion Award: Tony Ashby, The West Australian
- Daily News Centenary Prize: Carole Kerr and team, Channel 9
- Feature Prize: Tom Salom, The West Australian
- Photographic Prize: Tony Ashby, The West Australian
- Print News Prize: Judy Hughes, AAP
- Sports Prize: Steve Butler, South Western Times
- TV Camera Prize: Barry Dux, Channel 9
- TV Prize: Carole Kerr and team, Channel 9
- Arthur Lovekin Prize in Journalism: Marnie McKimmie, The West Australian

== 1995 winners ==
- Best Newcomer Prize: Peter Klinger, Kalgoorlie Miner
- Clarion Award: Peter Kennedy, ABC
- Daily News Centenary Prize: Luke Morfesse, The West Australian
- Feature Prize: Tony Barrass, The West Australian
- Print Graphics Prize: Gus Boyd, The West Australian
- Photographic Prize: Nic Ellis, The West Australian
- Print News Prize: Luke Morfesse, The West Australian
- Radio Prize: Liz Byrski, ABC Radio
- Sports Prize: Jim Gill, ABC Radio
- TV Camera Prize: Steve Bycroft, Channel 9
- TV Prize: Geof Parry, Channel 9
- Arthur Lovekin Prize in Journalism: Margot Lang, The West Australian
- Perth Press Club Prize: Cyril Ayris, The West Australian

== 1996 winners ==
- Best Newcomer Prize: Paul Kadak, Channel 9
- Clarion Award: David Cusworth, The West Australian
- Daily News Centenary Prize: Ron D'Raine, The West Australian
- Feature Prize: Victoria Laurie, freelance
- Print Graphics Prize: Don Lindsay, The West Australian
- Photographic Prize: Ron D'Raine, The West Australian
- Print News Prize: Luke Morfesse, The West Australian
- Radio Prize: Adrienne Lowth, ABC Radio
- Sports Prize: David Marsh, The West Australian
- TV Camera Prize: Stephen Bright, Channel 9
- TV Prize: Carole Kerr, Channel 9
- Arthur Lovekin Prize in Journalism: Vanessa Gould, The West Australian
- Perth Press Club Country Prize: Jay Townsend, Kalgoorlie Miner
- Perth Press Club Suburban Prize: Hillary Arber, Community Newspaper Group
- Perth Press Club Prize: Ann Treweek, The Sunday Times

== 1997 winners ==
- Best Newcomer Prize: Tracey Searle, Westside Sport
- Clarion Award: Chris Smyth, Alliance Secretary
- Daily News Centenary Prize: Gary Adshead, Channel 9
- Feature Prize: Colleen Egan, freelance
- Print Graphics Prize: Dean Alston, The West Australian
- Photographic Prize: Tony Ashby, The West Australian
- Print News Prize: Luke Morfesse, The West Australian
- Radio Prize: John McNamara, ABC Radio
- Sports Prize: Dave Hughes, The West Australian
- Sub-editing Prize: David Cusworth, The West Australian
- TV Camera Prize: Steve Bycroft, freelance
- TV Prize: Gary Adshead, Channel 9
- Arthur Lovekin Prize in Journalism: Michael Day, The West Australian
- Perth Press Club Country Prize: Gabrielle Adams, Augusta-Margaret River Mail
- Perth Press Club Suburban Prize: Linda Callaghan, Post Newspapers
- Perth Press Club Prize: Margot Lang, The West Australian

== 1998 winners ==
- Best Newcomer Prize: Joanna Ball ABC and Natasha Harradine Mid West Times
- Clarion Award: George Williams, Post Newspapers
- Daily News Centenary Prize: Mairi Barton, The West Australian
- Feature Prize: Anne Burns, The West Australian
- Print Graphics Prize: Dean Alston, The West Australian
- Photographic Prize: Tony McDonough, freelance
- Print News Prize: Mairi Barton, The West Australian
- Sports Prize: Gary Stocks, The West Australian
- Sub-editing Prize: Robert Hunt, The West Australian
- TV Camera Prize: Steve Bycroft, freelance
- TV Prize: Graeme Butler, Channel 10
- Arthur Lovekin Prize in Journalism: Norm Aisbett, The West Australian
- Perth Press Club Country Prize: Sally Cox and Maria Ligerakis, Mandurah Mail
- Perth Press Club Suburban Prize: George Williams, Post Newspapers
- Perth Press Club Prize: Michael Day, The West Australian

== 1999 winners ==
- Best Newcomer Prize: Michael Tetlow, GWN
- Clarion Award: Estelle Blackburn, Freelance
- Daily News Centenary Prize: Robert Duncan, The West Australian
- Feature Prize: Victoria Laurie, freelance
- Print Graphics Prize: Dean Alston, The West Australian
- Photographic Prize: Robert Duncan, The West Australian
- Print News Prize: Gay McNamara, The West Australian
- Radio Prize: Liam Bartlett, ABC 720
- Sports Prize: Bevan Eakins, The West Australian
- Sub-editing Prize: James Henderson, The Sunday Times
- TV Camera Prize: Wayne Waller, Channel 9
- TV Prize: Graeme Butler, Channel 7
- Arthur Lovekin Prize in Journalism: Bevan Eakins, The West Australian
- Perth Press Club Country Prize: Melanie Van Helvort, South Western Times
- Perth Press Club Suburban Prize: Martin Turner, Community Newspaper Group
- Perth Press Club Prize: Estelle Blackburn, Freelance

== 2000 winners ==
- Best Newcomer Prize: Nicolette Casella, The Sunday Times, and Alison Carter, ABC TV
- Business Prize: Mark Drummond, AFR
- Clarion Award: Bev East, Branch Assistant Secretary
- Daily News Centenary Prize: Torrance Mendez, The West Australian
- Feature Prize: Liam Bartlett, ABC 720
- Print Graphics Prize: Sean Leahy, The Sunday Times
- Photographic Prize: Nic Ellis, The West Australian
- Print News Prize: Torrance Mendez, The West Australian
- Radio Prize: Peter Kennedy, ABC Radio
- Sports Prize: Matt Price, The Australian
- Sub-editing Prize: David Cusworth, The West Australian
- TV Camera Prize: Darren Speedie, Channel 9
- TV Prize: Simon Dowding, Channel 7
- Arthur Lovekin Prize in Journalism: Kim Macdonald, The Sunday Times
- Perth Press Club Country Prize: Robert Newton, Augusta-Margaret River Mail
- Perth Press Club Suburban Prize: Kerry Faulkner, Post Newspapers
- Perth Press Club Prize: Tony Ashby, The West Australian

== 2001 winners ==
- Best Newcomer Prize: Grant Taylor, Kalgoorlie Miner
- Broadcast Graphics Prize: Kym Cohen, ABC TV
- Business Prize: Mark Drummond, AFR
- Clarion Award: Martin Saxon, The Sunday Times
- Daily News Centenary Prize: Chris Johnston, Geraldton Guardian
- Feature Prize: Victoria Laurie, The Australian
- Print Graphics Prize: Dean Alston, The West Australian
- Photographic Prize: Michael O'Brien, The West Australian
- Print News Prize: Chris Johnston, Geraldton Guardian
- Radio Prize: Liam Bartlett, ABC 720
- Sports Prize: Gary Adshead, The Sunday Times
- Sub-editing Prize: David Turnock, WA Business News
- TV Camera Prize: Tim Cohen, Channel 7
- TV Prize: Paul Kadak, Channel 7
- Arthur Lovekin Prize in Journalism: John Flint, The Sunday Times
- Perth Press Club Country Prize: Chris Johnston, Geraldton Guardian
- Perth Press Club Suburban Prize: Fiona Adolph, Perth Weekly
- Perth Press Club Prize: Carmelo Amalfi, The West Australian

== 2002 winners ==
- Best Newcomer Prize: Luke Eliot, Kalgoorlie Miner
- Broadcast Graphics Prize: Kym Cohen, ABC TV
- Business Prize: Peter Klinger, AFR
- Clarion Award: Kate Malkovic
- Daily News Centenary Prize: Victoria Laurie & Colleen Egan, The Australian
- Feature Prize: Victoria Laurie & Colleen Egan, The Australian
- Print Graphics Prize: Colin Poad, The West Australian
- Photographic Prize: Barry Baker, The West Australian
- Print News Prize: John Flint & Kim Macdonald, The Sunday Times
- Radio Prize: Liam Bartlett, ABC 720
- Sports Prize: John Flint, The Sunday Times
- Sub-editing Prize: Lloyd Jones, The Sunday Times
- TV Camera Prize: Trent Nind, Channel 9
- TV Prize: Paula Hudson, Channel 9
- Arthur Lovekin Prize in Journalism: Victoria Laurie & Colleen Egan, The Australian
- Perth Press Club Country Prize: Liam Phillips, Kalgoorlie Miner
- Perth Press Club Suburban Prize: Paige Taylor, Post Newspapers
- Perth Press Club Prize: Natalie O'Brien, The Australian

== 2003 winners ==
- Health and Medical Prize: Joe Spagnolo, South Western Times
- Resources Prize: Steve Pennells, The West Australian
- Feature Photography: Frances Andrijich, The Weekend Australian Magazine
- News Photography: Alf Sorbello, freelance
- Travel Report: Steven Scourfield, The West Australian
- Print News: John Flint, The Sunday Times
- Print Graphics: Rachel Coad/Alison Wakeham/Steve Penn, The West Australian
- Sub-editing Prize: David Cusworth, The West Australian
- TV Prize: Mark Readings, Channel 9
- Broadcast Graphics Prize: Kym Cohen, ABC TV
- TV Camera Prize: Barry Dux, Channel 9
- Feature Prize: David de Vos and colleagues, ABC TV
- Business News Prize: Sean Cowan, The West Australian
- Sports Prize: Nick Taylor, The Sunday Times
- Best Newcomer: Sophie McNeill, SBS Dateline
- Student Prize: Jessica Vanderende, Curtin University
- Centenary Prize: Mark Readings, Channel 9
- Perth Press Club Awards:
  - Country Prize: Mark Hooper, Esperance Express
  - Post Newspapers Suburban Newspaper Award: Bethany Hiatt, Community Newspapers
  - Perth Press Club Prize: Colleen Egan, The Australian
- Clarion Prize: Malcolm Hollingsworth

== 2004 winners ==
- Best Newcomer: Megan Sadler, The Kalgoorlie Miner
- Business News: Sean Cowan and Philip Cornford, The West Australian
- Community Safety Reporting: Joe Spagnolo, South West Times
- Sports Prize: David Marsh, The West Australian
- Broadcast Graphics: Kym Cohen, ABC TV.
- TV Camera Prize: Wayne Waller, Channel 9
- TV Prize: Paula Hudson, Channel 9
- Feature Prize: Mark Irving, The West Australian
- Resources Prize: Jane Stinson, ABC TV
- Health & Medical News: John Flint, The Sunday Times
- Health & Medical Feature: Joe Spagnolo, South West Times
- Feature Photography: John Mokrzycki
- News Photography: John Mokrzycki
- Travel Report: Mark Irving, The West Australian
- Tourism Prize: Liam Phillips, The West Australian
- Sub-Editing Prize: Sheryl-lee Kerr, The Sunday Times
- Print Graphics: Emma Thompson, The West Australian
- Print News: Steve Butler and Ben Martin, The West Australian
- Perth Press Club Country Prize: Joe Spagnolo, South West Times
- Perth Press Club Suburban Prize: George Williams, Post Newspapers
- Perth Press Club Prize: Steve Butler, The West Australian
- Lovekin Prize: Bret Christian, Post Newspapers
- Clarion Award: Martin Turner
- Daily News Centenary Prize: Sean Cowan and Philip Cornford, The West Australian

== 2005 winners ==
- A.H. Kornweibel Arts Prize: Liam Phillips, The West Australian
- Daily News Centenary Prize: Liam Bartlett, ABC Radio Perth
- Print News Prize: Paige Taylor, The Australian
- Print Graphics Prize: Greg Smith, The Sunday Times
- News Photography Prize: Greg Burke, The West Australian
- Feature Photography Prize: Nic Ellis, The West Australian
- Sub-Editing Prize: David Cusworth, The West Australian
- Country Prize: Kim Daly, The Albany Advertiser
- Suburban Prize: Pamela Medlen, Community Newspaper Group
- TV Prize: Grant Taylor, Channel 9
- Broadcast Graphics Prize: Gavin Smith, Channel 10
- TV Camera Prize: Tim Cohen, Channel 7
- Radio Prize: Liam Bartlett, ABC Radio Perth
- Feature Prize: Rochelle Mutton, The Weekend Australian.
- Health and Medical Feature Prize: Paige Taylor and Adam Cresswell, The Australian
- Tourism Prize: Griffin Longley, The West Australian
- Resources Prize: Nigel Wilson, The Australian
- Health and Medical News Prize: John Flint, The Sunday Times
- Business News Prize: Sean Cowan & Luke Eliot, The West Australian
- Travel Report: Steve Pennells, The West Australian
- Sports Prize: Nick Taylor, The Sunday Times
- Best Newcomer Prize: Marsha Jacobs, WA Business News
- Clarion Prize: Victoria Laurie
- Student Prize: Robert Scott, Murdoch University
- Arthur Lovekin Prize: Steve Pennells, The West Australian

== 2006 winners ==
- Best Newcomer Prize: Rhianna King, The West Australian
- Print Graphics Prize: Greg Smith, The Sunday Times
- Travel Prize: Jodi Monaghan, Pilbara News
- Sports Prize: Jonathan Cook, The West Australian
- Business Prize: Andrew Burrell, Australian Financial Review
- Feature Photography Prize: Astrid Volzke, The West Australian
- News Photography Prize: Lee Griffith, The West Australian
- Political Reporting Prize: Jessica Strutt, The West Australian
- Print News Prize: Colleen Egan, The Sunday Times
- Tourism Prize: Clint Wheeldon, ABC TV
- Resources Prize: Jessica Strutt, The West Australian
- Feature Prize: David de Vos, ABC TV
- Health and Medical Feature Prize: Marnie McKimmie, The West Australian
- Health and Medical News Prize: John Flint, The Sunday Times
- Consumer Affairs Prize: John Flint, The Sunday Times
- Sub-Editing Prize: George Williams, Post Newspapers
- Country Prize: Kym Daly, The Kalgoorlie Miner
- Suburban Prize: Beatrice Thomas, Community Newspapers
- TV Prize: Mara Pritchard, Channel 7
- TV Camera Prize: not awarded
- Radio Prize: Peter Kapsanis, ABC Radio
- Student Prize: Stephanie Painter, Murdoch University.
- A.H. Kornweibel Arts Prize: Griffin Longley, The West Australian
- Clarion Award: Nick Way
- Daily News Centenary Prize: Colleen Egan

== 2007 winners ==
- Best Newcomer Prize: Emmy Kubainski, ABC News
- Print Graphics Prize: Greg Smith, The Sunday Times
- Travel Prize: Robert Taylor, The West Australian
- Sports Prize: Paige Taylor & Tony Barrass, The Australian
- Business Prize: Paige Taylor & Tony Barrass, The Australian
- Feature Photography Prize: Paul McGovern, Post Newspapers
- News Photography Prize: Jody D'Arcy, The Sunday Times
- Political Reporting Prize: Andrew Probyn, The West Australian
- Print News Prize: Paige Taylor and Cath Hart, The Australian
- Tourism Prize: Griffin Longley, The West Australian
- Resources Prize: Nigel Wilson, The Australian
- Feature Prize: Mara Fox, The Sunday Times
- Electronic Feature: David de Vos, ABC TV
- Health and Medical Feature Prize: Elvira Nuic, ABC TV's Stateline
- Health and Medical News Prize: John Flint, The Sunday Times
- Consumer Affairs Prize: Joe Spagnolo, The Sunday Times
- Sub-Editing Prize: Stephen Fox, The Sunday Times
- Country Prize: Phillipa Prior, The Kalgoorlie Miner
- Suburban Prize: Mark McCrory, Community Newspaper Group
- TV Prize: Gary Adshead, Channel 7
- TV Camera Prize: James Hayward, Channel 7
- Broadcast Graphics Prize: Kym Cohen, ABC TV
- Radio Prize: David Weber, ABC Radio
- Student Prize: Jayde Little, WA Academy of Performing Arts
- A.H. Kornweibel Arts Prize: Leonie Harris, ABC TV's Stateline
- Arthur Lovekin Prize in Journalism: Steve Pennells, The West Australian
- Clarion Award: Joseph Fernandez
- Daily News Centenary Prize: Paige Taylor and Cath Hart, The Australian

== 2008 winners ==
- Best Newcomer Prize: Yasmine Phillips, The West Australian:
- Online Reporting Prize: Colleen Egan, Perth Now
- Science Prize: Leonie Harris, ABC TV
- Print Graphics Prize: Greg Smith, The Sunday Times
- Travel Prize: Narelle Towie, The Sunday Times
- Sports Prize: Paige Taylor, The Australian
- Business Prize: Sean Cowan and Gary Adshead, The West Australian
- Feature Photography Prize: Andrew Ritchie, Western Suburbs Weekly
- News Photography Prize: Guy Magowan, The West Australian
- Political Reporting Prize: Paul Lampathakis and Joe Spagnolo, The Sunday Times
- Tourism Prize: Bill Rule, The Sunday Times
- Print News Prize: Jessica Strutt, The West Australian
- Resources Prize: Ronan O'Connell and Sean Cowan, The West Australian
- Feature Prize: Gary Adshead, The West Australian
- Electronic Feature: Christien de Garis, ABC TV
- Health and Medical Feature Prize: Victoria Laurie, The Australian
- Health and Medical News Prize: Paul Lampathakis, The Sunday Times
- Consumer Affairs Prize: Simon Beaumont, 6PR
- Sub-Editing Prize: Sheryl-Lee Kerr, The Sunday Times
- Country Prize: Not awarded
- Suburban Prize: George Williams, POST Newspapers
- TV Prize: Amanda Paterson and Amelia Ballinger, A Current Affair
- TV Camera Prize: Nikki Holmes, A Current Affair
- Broadcast Graphics Prize: Kym Cohen, ABC TV
- Radio Prize: David Weber, ABC
- Student Prize: Dominique Pratt, Edith Cowan University
- A.H. Kornweibel Arts Prize: David de Vos, ABC TV
- Arthur Lovekin Prize: George Williams, POST Newspapers
- Clarion Award: Colleen Egan
- Daily News Centenary Prize: George Williams, POST Newspapers

== 2009 winners ==
- Best Newcomer Prize: Jolleh Abshar, Channel 9/A Current Affair
- Online Reporting Prize: Sharon Kennedy, ABC Southwest
- Science Prize: Flip Prior, The West Australian.
- Print Graphics Prize: Dean Alston, The West Australian
- Sports Prize: Billy Rule, The Sunday Times
- Business Prize: Andrew Burrell, The Australian Financial Review
- News Photography Prize: Kerris Berrington, The Sunday Times
- Feature Photography Prize: Frances Andrijich, The West Magazine/The West Australian; Karin Calvert-Borshoff, STM/The Sunday Times
- Political Reporting Prize: Paul Lampathakis, The Sunday Times
- Print News Prize: Paige Taylor, The Australian
- Travel Prize: Matt Tinney, Channel 9
- Resources Prize: Sean Cowan, The West Australian
- Print Feature Prize: Steve Pennells, The West Australian
- Electronic Feature: Dixie Marshall and Michelle Lord, Channel 9's A Current Affair
- Health and Medical Feature Prize: Lara Ladyman, The Countryman
- Health and Medical News Prize: Paul Lampathakis, The Sunday Times
- Consumer Affairs Prize: Sean Cowan and Gary Adshead, The West Australian
- Sub-Editing Prize: David Cusworth, The West Australian
- Country Prize: Nathan Dyer, Kimberley Echo
- Suburban Prize: Linda Callaghan, POST Newspapers
- TV Prize: Rochelle Mutton, Channel 9
- TV Camera Prize: Gayle Adams, Channel 7/Today Tonight
- Radio Prize: David Weber, ABC Radio; and Geoff Hutchison, ABC 720 Perth
- Student Prize: Jamie Burnett, WA Academy of Performing Arts
- A.H. Kornweibel Arts Prize: Nikki Wilson-Smith: ABC TV Stateline
- Arthur Lovekin Prize: Gary Adshead, The West Australian
- Daily News Centenary Prize: Sean Cowan and Gary Adshead, The West Australian

== 2010 winners ==
- Daily News Centenary Award: Gary Adshead & Sean Cowan, The West Australian
- Arthur Lovekin Prize: Paige Taylor, The Australian, and Gary Adshead & Sean Cowan, The West Australian
- Arts: Claire Nichols, ABC TV
- Best Newcomer Prize: Phoebe Wearne, Albany Advertiser
- Business: Paul Lampathakis, The Sunday Times
- Cartoon: Greg Smith, The Sunday Times
- Clarion: Tony Barrass
- Columnist: Sarah Quinton, The West Australian
- Consumer Affairs: Caro Meldrum-Hanna, Sarah Ferguson & Michael Doyle, ABC TV's Four Corners
- Electronic Feature: Nikki Wilson-Smith, ABC TV
- Environment: Linda Callaghan, Post Newspapers
- Feature Photography: Theo Fakos The Sunday Times
- Health Feature: Cathy O'Leary, The West Australian
- Health News: Paul Lampathakis, The Sunday Times
- News Photography: Michael Wilson, The West Australian
- Online: Nick Butterly, Lee Griffith & Adam Vou, WA Newspapers
- Politics: Paul Lampathakis, The Sunday Times
- Print Feature: Gary Adshead & Sean Cowan, The West Australian
- Print News: Paige Taylor, The Australian
- Radio: Damian Rabbitt, ABC Radio 720 Perth
- Regional: Nick Sas Albany Advertiser:
- Resources: Frances Pratt, Kalgoorlie Miner
- Sport: Glen Foreman, The Sunday Times
- Student: Damian Smith, WAAPA
- Sub-editing: Paul Barry, The West Australian
- Suburban: Liam Croy, Community Newspaper Group
- TV Camera: Peter Lettenmaier, Channel 7
- TV News: Channel Seven News team entry

== 2011 winners ==
- Daily News Centenary Award: Steve Pennells, The West Australian
- Arthur Lovekin Prize: Angela Pownall, Cathy O'Leary, Marnie McKimmie, The West Australian
- Arts: Claire Nichols, ABC
- Best Newcomer: Emma Sheridan, GWN
- Business: Jonathan Barrett and Peter Kerr, Australian Financial Review
- Cartoon: Greg Smith, The Sunday Times
- Clarion: David Cohen, POST Newspapers
- Columnist: Joe Spagnolo, Sunday Times
- Environment: David Cohen, POST Newspapers
- Feature Photography: Steve Pennells, The West Australian
- Health: Marnie McKimmie and Cathy O'Leary, The West Australian
- Indigenous Affairs: Nicole Cox, The Sunday Times
- News Photography: Michael Wilson, The West Australian
- Online: Christopher Manly, The West Australian
- Politics: Sean Cowan and Beatrice Thomas, The West Australian
- Print Feature: Steve Pennells, The West Australian
- Print News: Steve Pennells, The West Australian
- Radio News: Damian Rabbitt, ABC
- Radio Current Affairs: David Weber, ABC
- Regional: Rania Spooner, The Kalgoorlie Miner
- Science: Nikki Wilson-Smith, ABC
- Social Equity Report: Steve Pennells, The West Australian
- Sport: Sean Cowan, The West Australian
- Student: Alex Soares, Murdoch University
- Sub-editing: Paul Barry, The West Australian
- Suburban: Linda Callaghan, Bret Christian and Lloyd Gorman, POST Newspapers
- TV Camera: Trent Nind, Channel Seven
- TV Current Affairs: Jake Sturmer, ABC
- TV News: Seven News Team, Channel Seven

== 2012 winners ==
- Daily News Centenary Award: Anthony DeCeglie, The Sunday Times
- Arthur Lovekin Prize: Paige Taylor, The Australian
- Arts: Nick Way, Channel Ten
- Best Newcomer: Emma Sheridan, Emma Young, Community Newspapers
- Business: Steve Pennells, The West Australian
- Cartoon: Greg Smith, The Sunday Times
- Clarion: Steve Pennells, The West Australian
- Columnist: Andrew Probyn, The West Australian
- Environment: Narelle Towie, The Sunday Times
- Feature Photography: Lee Griffith, The West Australian
- Health: Anthony DeCeglie, The Sunday Times
- Indigenous Affairs: Yasmine Phillips, The Sunday Times
- News Photography: Daniel Wilkins, The Sunday Times
- Online: Katherine Fleming, Kate Ferguson, Adam Vou, Alex Noor and Christopher Manly, thewest.com.au
- Politics: Gary Adshead, The West Australian
- Print Feature: Joseph Catanzaro, The West Australian
- Print News: Anthony DeCeglie, The Sunday Times
- Radio News: Meri Fatin, Nadia Mitsopoulos and Geoff Hutchison, ABC
- Regional: Emma Sheridan, GWN7 News
- Science: Narelle Towie, ABC
- Social Equity Report: Steve Pennells, The West Australian
- Sport: Glen Foreman, The Sunday Times
- Student: Clint Jasper, Curtin University
- Sub-editing: David Cusworth, The Sunday Times
- Suburban: Kaitlyn Offer, Midland Kalamunda Reporter & Lloyd Gorman, POST Newspapers
- TV Camera: Gayle Adams, Channel Seven
- TV Current Affairs: Jake Sturmer, ABC
- TV News: Grant Taylor, Channel Seven

== 2013 winners ==
- The Daily News Centenary Prize: Kirsti Melville and Meri Fatin
- The Clarion Award: Tony Malkovic
- Best Print/Text News Report: Luke Eliot, Gary Adshead, Amanda Banks, Rhianna King and Gabrielle Knowles, The West Australian
- Best Print /Text Feature Writing: Steve Pennells, The West Australia
- Best Three Headlines: David Cusworth, The Sunday Times
- Suburban – Best Three Stories or Feature: Anne Gartner, Community Newspaper Group
- Best News Photograph: Colin Murty, The Australian
- Best Feature Photographic Essay: Steve Pennells, The West Australian
- Television/Audio-Visual Journalism – Best News Story or Feature: Steve Pennells, Paul Walker and Richard Cunningham; Seven Network
- Radio/Audio Journalism - Best News Story or Feature: Kirsti Melville and Meri Fatin, 360documentaries, ABC Radio National
- Best Multi-Media Report or Series: Jerrie Demasi, WAtoday.com.au (Fairfax)
- Best Broadcast Camerawork: Carl Nelson, Network Ten
- Best Political Report: Andrew Probyn, The West Australian
- Best Health/Medical Report: Cathy O'Leary, The West Australian
- Best Science and Environmental Report: David Weber, ABC Radio, TV news and online
- Business, Economics or Finance Report: Nick Evans, The West Australian
- Best Sports Report: Steve Butler, The West Australian
- Best Social Equity Report: Steve Pennells, The West Australian
- Regional and Community – Best Three News Stories or Features: James Purtill, The West Australian and The Kalgoorlie Miner
- Best Culture and Arts Report: Kristy Symonds, The Sunday Times and Perth Now
- Best Columnist - The Matt Price Award: Jonathan Barrett, The Australian Financial Review and AFR online
- Best New Journalist or Cadet: Rachel Cary, GWN7 News
- Outstanding Journalism Student Award: Syan Dougherty, Edith Cowan University
- Arthur Lovekin Prize: Steve Pennells, The West Australian

== 2014 winners ==
- 2014 Daily News Centenary Prize: Jonathan Barrett, Fairfax Media
- The Clarion Award: Neale Prior
- The Arthur Lovekin Prize for Excellence in Journalism: John Flint, The Sunday Times
- Best Print/Text News Report: Cathy Saunders and Martin Saxon, The Sunday Times
- Best Print/Text Feature Writing: Jonathan Barrett, AFR Weekend
- Best Three Headlines: David Cusworth, POST Newspapers
- Suburban – Best 3 News Features Print/Online: Emma Young, Comment News
- Best Cartoon, Illustration or Graphic: Greg Smith, The Sunday Times
- TV/Audio-Visual Journalism - Best News Story or Feature: Caitlyn Gribbin, ABC Television 7.30, "Who is Doctor Nitschke advising?"
- Best Broadcast Camerawork: Carl Nelson, Network Ten Perth
- Radio/Audio Journalism – Radio News Story or Feature: Caitlyn Gribbin, PM, ABC Local Radio
- Best News Photograph: Sharon Smith, The West Australian, "The Shark Cull Begins"
- Best News Photograph – Suburban: Jon Hewson, Community Newspaper Group
- Best Feature Photographic Essay: Steve Pennells, The West Australian
- Best Multi Media Report or Series: Narelle Towie and Pippa Doyle, WAToday
- A.H Kornweibel Prize for Best Culture & Arts Report: Victoria Laurie, The Australian Review Section
- Business Economics or Finance Report: Jonathan Barrett, AFR Weekend
- Best Political Report: Geof Parry, Seven News Perth
- Matt Price Award for Best Columnist: Andrew Probyn, The West Australian
- Social Equity Report: Jonathan Barrett, AFR Weekend
- Best Science and Environmental Report: John Flint, The Sunday Times
- Best Freelance Journalist: Kerry Faulkner, RM Williams Outback Magazine
- Best Health/Medical Report: Caitlyn Gribbin, ABC Television 7.30
- Regional & Community: Best 3 News Features (70km): Michael Dulaney, Kalgoorlie Miner
- Outstanding Journalism Student: Kyle Brown, Edith Cowan University
- Best New Journalist or Cadet: Chenee Marrapodi, WA Today.com.au
- Best Sports Report: Steve Butler, The West Australian

== 2016 winners ==
- 2016 Daily News Centenary Prize: Andrew Probyn, The West Australian
- The Clarion Award: Nick Evans, The West Australian
- The Arthur Lovekin Prize for Excellence in Journalism: David Cohen, The Post
- Best Print/Text News Report: Andrew Probyn, The West Australian
- Best Print/Text Feature Writing: Andrew Burrell, The Weekend Australian
- Best Three Headlines: Martin Saxon, The Sunday Times STM Magazine
- Suburban – Best 3 News Features Print/Online: Sarah Brookes, Echo Newspaper
- TV/Audio-Visual Journalism - Best News Story or Feature: Jessica Page, Seven News.
- Best Broadcast Camerawork: Cameron Wallis, Seven News
- Radio/Audio Journalism – Radio News Story or Feature: Lauren Day, ABC
- Best News Photograph: Marta Pascual Juanola, Mandurah Mail
- Best News Photograph – Community/Regional: Jon Gellweiler, Ampersand Southwest Magazine
- Best Feature Photographic Essay: Coilin Murty, The Australian
- Online: Simon White, Emma Young, Tim Carrier, Heather McNeil and David Baker, WAtoday
- A.H Kornweibel Prize for Best Culture & Arts Report: Victoria Laurie, The Weekend Australian
- Business Economics or Finance Report: Courtney Bembridge, ABC
- Best Political Report: Andrew Probyn, The West Australian / Rebecca Turner & Jessica Strutt, ABC
- Matt Price Award for Best Columnist: Liam Bartlett, The Sunday Times
- Social Equity Report: Paige Taylor & Victoria Laurie, The Weekend Australian
- Best Science and Environmental Report: Emma Young, WAtoday
- Best Freelance Journalist: Kerry Faulkner
- Best Health/Medical Report: Emma Young, WAtoday
- Regional & Community: Best 3 News Features (70km): Nathan Morris, ABC
- Outstanding Journalism Student: Thomas de Souza, Edith Cowan University
- Best New Journalist or Cadet: Nathan Hondros, Mandurah Mail
- Best Sports Report: John Townsend, The West Australian
