= Eleanor Martin =

Australian dancer (1951–2020)

- Born: 22 September 1951; London, England
- Died: 29 February 2020 (aged 69); Hobart, Tasmania
- Other names: Eleanor Lynn
- Occupation: Dancer
- Employer: Australian Ballet Company
- Known for: Ballet
- Children: 2
- Parents: Catherine Martin; Francis Martin

Eleanor Martin (1951 – 29 February 2020) was a dancer who performed with the West Australian Ballet, the Australian Ballet Company, and the Australian Dance Theatre.

== Early life ==
Martin was born in London, England in the United Kingdom and emigrated to Western Australia together with her sister, mother, The West Australian journalist Catherine Martin, and her Czech–born father. Martin attended Churchlands Senior High School.

== Career ==
At the age of 12 she danced for the Queen of Thailand in the 1963 Thai-Australian ballet "Sirikit and Wattle".

She was part of the 1967 intake at the Australian Ballet School. In 1968 she performed in "The Prime of Miss Jean Brodie" by Jay Presson Allen in Melbourne. Martin was part of the first cohort of the Australian Ballet School's third year class in 1969. She was one of the dancers in the inaugural professional ensemble of the West Australian Ballet.

Martin was a dancer in the scenes choreographed by Margaret Scott in the controversial 1970 documentary The Naked Bunyip. Martin choreographed the dance for "2 Short Circuits" by Carl Vine, his first work commissioned by the West Australian Ballet Company. In 1971 Martin joined the Australian Dance Theatre tour to Taipei, Taiwan.

== Personal life ==
Martin became an Australian citizen by naturalization in 1954. She married and divorced twice. First to mental health professional Patrick Marwick (m. 1978, div. 1989), with whom she had two children, and second to lawyer Andrew Lynn (m. 2005, div. 2010).
