= Paul Murray (journalist) =

Journalist from Western Australia

Paul Murray is a former working journalist and later editor of The West Australian newspaper who resigned and was later retained to write opinion articles for the same newspaper. Murray was the longest serving newspaper editor in Australia when he resigned in February 2000.

== Biography ==
=== Early life ===
Murray was born in Mount Lawley in 1950, and grew up in the eastern Perth suburb of Guildford in the Swan Valley. His father, Keith Murray, was a journalist at The West Australian for a decade from 1948 and his older brother Kim was a reporter at the Daily News. He attended Guildford Primary School and then Guildford Grammar School. He initially studied geology at the University of Western Australia, then worked as a mine geologist in Kalgoorlie before changing career.

=== Career ===
He took a cadetship at The West Australian in 1970 and through the 1970s worked variously from its Fremantle, Kalgoorlie, Perth, Sydney and Melbourne offices. He worked at the Western Mail from 1981, before returning to The West Australian as chief of staff in 1987. In March 1990 he was appointed editor of the newspaper where he began his career in 1970. He quit The West ten years later to become a morning talk-back announcer on Perth commercial radio station, 6PR, before leaving in 2006 over a contract-renewal disagreement (he rejoined in 2011). In 2006 he returned to The West Australian as a columnist and feature writer.

During his tenure as editor of The West Australian he took the circulation of the newspaper to over 400,000 for the first time (1997) and, in 1998, to over one million readers for the newspaper's Saturday edition. He introduced "Asia Desk", which involved the assignment of a journalist to cover events mainly in Southeast Asia.

Murray won WA's top journalism award, the University of Western Australia's Lovekin Prize in 1985, and the Daily News Centenary Prize in 1986, as well as the Beck Prize for political journalism in 1986.
