= Ange McCormack =

Australian journalist and radio presenter

- Born: Angela McCormack; Sydney, New South Wales, Australia
- Occupations: Journalist; social media producer; photographer; filmmaker; radio presenter
- Years active: 2018–present
- Known for: Inaugural recipient of the Music Journalist Award at the Australian Women in Music Awards; Radio interview with Scott Morrison
- Website: www.angela-mccormack.com

Angela McCormack is an Australian journalist, social media producer, photographer, filmmaker, and radio presenter from Sydney, New South Wales. She currently works for Triple J's news and current affairs radio program Hack.

McCormack conducted an interview with the Prime Minister of Australia Scott Morrison on 22 July 2021, her handling of which received praise from multiple publications.

McCormack has received accolades for her writing, including being the inaugural recipient of the Twitter Australia Music Journalist Award at the 2nd Annual edition of the Australian Women in Music Awards.

== Early life ==
Angela McCormack was born in Sydney, New South Wales.

== Recognition and reception ==
McCormack received the inaugural Twitter Australia Music Journalist Award at the 2019 Australian Women in Music Awards, for being "a female music journalist, blogger or editor who has made a creative contribution and courageous impact in truth telling and innovative reporting in the Australian music industry".

McCormack received praise for her handling of an interview with the Prime Minister of Australia, Scott Morrison. Pedestrian.TV''s Saskia Morrison-Thiagu wrote that she "handl[ed] [the] interview well", saying, "Ange McCormack absolutely went to town on Prime Minister Scott Morrison on Hack today, grilling him on everything from the bungled vaccine rollout to people on Youth Allowance being unable to access COVID disaster payments." Purple Sneakers's Parry Tritsiniotis stated that she "nailed" the interview, writing, "for the first time throughout the pandemic, it felt like our issues as youth had been heard, with someone finally acknowledging our struggles to the most powerful man in the country. Bravo Ange McCormack!"

== Career ==
=== 2018–2020: Early career ===
On 18 October 2018, McCormack, alongside Karla Arnall and Philippa McDonald for Hack, were named as finalists for the Radio/Audio News and Current Affairs Award at the 61st annual Walkley Awards for their article entitled "Disturbing NSW Health privacy breach revealed". Throughout March 2019, she conducted Hack's annual By the Numbers investigation into the number of women in Australian music. On 12 September 2019, she was nominated for the inaugural Twitter Australia Music Journalist Award at the 2019 Australian Women in Music Awards, which she was announced as the recipient of on 9 October.

=== 2021–present: Hack hosting and Scott Morrison interview ===
On 14 May 2021, McCormack was announced as the fill-in host of Triple J's news and current affairs radio program Hack whilst regular host Avani Dias took leave to work with Four Corners. She hosted the show from 17 May to 23 July. On 22 July, McCormack conducted an interview with Scott Morrison for the program, where they discussed the ongoing vaccine rollout, Youth Allowance, and climate change. McCormack is a reporter and social media producer for Hack, where she creates short video documentaries and audio packages, writes reports for the program's daily show and podcast, writes articles, and manages their social media profiles.

== Awards and nominations ==
=== Australian Women in Music Awards ===
Year	Nominee / work	Award	Result	Ref.
2019	Herself	Twitter Australia Music Journalist Award	Won	

=== Walkley Awards ===
Year	Nominee / work	Award	Result	Ref.
2018	Herself (with Karla Arnall and Philippa McDonald for Hack, ABC)	Radio/Audio News and Current Affairs	Shortlisted	
