= Merak =

Merak may refer to:

== Places ==
- Merak, Bhutan, a village
- Merak, Ladakh, a village in India
- Port of Merak, a seaport in Indonesia

== Other uses ==
- Merak (star) or Beta Ursae Majoris, a star in the constellation Ursa Major
- Merak Film S.r.l., a defunct dubbing studio in Milan, Italy
- Merak Mail Server, now IceWarp Mail Server
- Merak Temple, a Hindu temple in Central Java, Indonesia
- Maserati Merak, an Italian automobile produced from 1972 to 1983
- USS Merak, several ships of the US Navy

== See also ==
- Meråker Municipality, a municipality in Trøndelag, Norway
- Meraki (disambiguation)
