= Tom Tilley =

Tom Tilley may refer to:

- Tom Tilley (ice hockey)
- Tom Tilley (television presenter)
