= Andre Malan =

- Andre Malan (cricketer)
- Andre Malan (journalist)
