= Australian Journalist of the Year =

Australian Journalist of the Year may refer to:

- Young Australian Journalist of the Year
- Graham Perkin Australian Journalist of the Year Award
- Gold Walkley award for journalism
