= Best Young Journalist =

Best Young Journalist is an award given by several different organizations across a broad spectrum of disciplines in journalism. These include:

- Best Young Journalist (wine), an award in wine journalism given at the VinItaly expo in Verona, Italy
- British Press Awards, which in years such as 2006 will have a "Best Young Journalist" award
- Young Australian Journalist of the Year, a companion award to the Walkley Awards
