= Muraki =

Muraki may refer to:

- Muraki, Fars, a village in Iran
- Muraki (surname), a Japanese surname

== See also ==
- Meraki (disambiguation)
