= Louis Giustiniani =

Italian-English missionary

Louis (or Luis) Giustiniani was the first missionary to the Swan River Colony. He was outspoken in defending Aboriginal Australians, but in doing so alienated the colony and was eventually removed from office. After leaving Western Australia, Giustiniani became a Minister of the Evangelical Lutheran Church in the United States.

== Appointment ==
In 1835, the Western Australian Missionary Society, a society formed in Dublin and London in part by Colonel Frederick Irwin, appointed Giustiniani to establish a mission in the Swan River Colony, Western Australia.

Rev Dr Giustiniani, the Missionary selected by the Society, is highly approved of by the London and Dublin Committee, for his spirit and acquirements; he is a man singularly fitted to conduct the Mission. Dr Giustiniani has been in the habit of preaching in London in English, German, French and Italian; he knows, also, the Hebrew, Syriac, Greek and Latin languages. He has a good practical knowledge of the sciences, botany, chemistry, mechanics etc. He has also taken a degree as a physician. He has fully proved his sincerity and devotedness to the cause by the sacrifices he has made.

Giustiniani was from the noble Italian Giustiniani family, one of the princes of which had married into an English family, and Louis was connected to the heirs of the estate and title of Earl of Newburgh. He was Catholic by upbringing but had renounced the Catholic faith.

His mission was to "civilise" and Christianise the Aboriginal people, and to learn their language.

Giustiniani and his wife Maria arrived in the Colony of Western Australia on Addingham on 26 June 1836. On his arrival, Giustiniani was in poor health.

Giustiniani's first church service was held at Guildford on 31 July 1836 that attracted an attendance of about 60 people in spite of "boisterous weather". By this time his health had improved, but although he had only been in the colony a few weeks, he was accused of not having taken any steps towards the instruction of Aboriginal people.

His response included the statement that the settlers "stand nearly as much in need of religious instruction as the" Aboriginal people. This statement resulted in numerous letters to the Perth Gazette, particularly on the part of "A Publican", (Note: "A Publican" was later suggested to be Captain Francis Whitfield, Government Resident of Guildford, a leading civil servant and Justice of the Peace.) criticising his "excess of zeal".

Giustiniani visited York in September 1836 and preached the first sermon in the York district, at Joseph Hardey’s and then at Rivett Henry Bland’s. He promised to visit every seventh week. This visit coincided with the murder of an Aboriginal person who was taking flour from a barn, by Ned Gallop, at the direction of his employer Arthur Trimmer, which Giustiniani investigated.

Governor Stirling gave Giustiniani a parcel of his own land at Woodbridge, Guildford, upon which to start a mission and school, which he intended to be along Moravian lines. His wife was probably a member of the Moravian Church. He succeeded in constructing a church which was situated approximately where the Guildford Grammar School Chapel now stands.

== Defence of Aboriginal people ==
By the end of 1836, with these kinds of allegations, Giustiniani had alienated the colony's most senior clergyman, Colonial Chaplain John Burdett Wittenoom.

Giustiniani and Wittenoom confronted each other a number of times across a courtroom, with Wittenoom representing the Government and Giustiniani taking the position of Aboriginals. For example, in October 1837, Giustiniani defended three Aboriginal persons charged with the theft of flour, dough and butter in the district of the Upper Swan. He argued that Aboriginals should be treated as minors in law, for "as long as" they "were unacquainted with the elementary principles of civilised society they ought not to be judged by the laws of that society". His defence was not accepted. The Aboriginal persons were sentenced to hard labour and transportation.

== Giustiniani begins to detail incidents ==
Giustiniani befriended William Nairne Clark, the editor of the Swan River Guardian, a solicitor and self‐proclaimed radical and government critic, who led a group of colony radicals.

In the Swan River Guardian and correspondence, Giustiniani began to openly name and accuse important settlers of acts of violence against Aboriginals.

He accused "Arthur Trimmer and other gentlemen" of organising a "hunting party" to shoot as many Aboriginals as possible. Trimmer was married to Mary Ann Spencer, a daughter of the Government Resident of King George Sound, Sir Richard Spencer.

Giustiniani also claimed that Edward Souper shot and killed an Aboriginal woman and wounded an Aboriginal man, the woman's ears were cut off and Trimmer hung them in his kitchen as a trophy, his house being next to Bland who was the Government Resident. "Mr Trimmer who permits such barbarous acts in his house, is invited to the Governor's table".

Giustiniani wrote a series of open letters to Lord Glenelg, critical of the treatment by settlers of the Aboriginals, including allegations of the "blood scene at York". Each of these letters was published in the Swan River Guardian. The letters were sent by private messenger, mistrusting the office of the Colonial Secretary, Peter Broun. In these letters, he referred among other things to:

- The punitive expedition of Lieutenant Bunbury despatched by Governor Stirling against Aboriginals after the killing of Chidlow and Jones in July 1837 in which martial law was declared.
- The incident in which Mcleod, the Acting Government Resident of York, had entered an Aboriginal camp at night, shooting into huts and wounding two Aboriginals, including a woman.
- The fact that the editor of the Perth Gazette had advocated "a second Pinjarra example", the first being the Pinjarra massacre.

== Claims against Giustiniani ==
Giustiniani was attacked for being a foreigner and a number of claims were made against him including:

- beating his wife, who had "more than once had been compelled to seek the protection of a neighbouring Magistrate against his violence", and
- one of his catechists, Abraham Jones, was committing "certain improper acts and intercourse with the native women."

Giustiniani denied these claims and Abraham Jones was cleared of the accusations.

Giustiniani was also refused permission to become a British subject and buy land.

== Departure ==
The Western Australian Missionary Society dismissed Giustiniani and gave him 50 pounds for his passage home. Giustiniani departure for England on 13 February 1838 on Abercrombie. (Note: Also on board was Thomas Mellersh who observed in his diary entry of 23 February 1839: "Mrs Giustiniani was very unwell. The Doctor's behaviour towards her is not very affectionate or creditworthy, to see a man maltreat his wife causes my indignation beyond description".) By every measure, his mission failed.
