= James West (journalist) =

Australian journalist, and author (born 1982)

James West (born 21 February 1982) is an American journalist, and author. He is the executive editor of the Center for Investigative Reporting, which produces Mother Jones, the public radio show and podcast Reveal, and the podcast More To The Story.

== Early life and education ==
West was born in Sydney and attended high school at Barker College, an independent school in Hornsby, a North Shore suburb of Sydney. He is a graduate of the University of Sydney (Bachelor of Arts in Media and Communications) and New York University (Masters of Journalism).

== Career ==
West worked as a radio producer for the Australian Broadcasting Corporation in Sydney, in Beijing as a Foreign Expert at China Radio International where he was the inaugural producer of leading Australian podcast Mr Science Show, and as Producer of Triple J's national, daily current affairs program, Hack. He has also worked in television as a producer of the Insight program at SBS Television.

Since 2011, he has been based in New York City and worked in several roles for the American news organization Mother Jones, and after it merged with the Center for Investigative Reporting in 2024, he became executive editor of the merged organization.

His memoir, Beijing Blur (ISBN 9780143006756), was published by Penguin Books in Australia in June 2008. The book is an account of West's time in Beijing in 2005–06, particularly at China Radio International, and also includes chapters on capital punishment, Chinese punk rock music, blogging, and China's gay and lesbian culture. It is published in the US and Canada by Cuttyhunk/Landsdown Books, and in the UK by Crimson Publishing.

West gained international attention after posting a YouTube video asking to be invited to the Tran family Thanksgiving dinner in Florida, having received their personal emails for 3 years. The video, and subsequent journey from Sydney to Florida gained press attention in Australia and the US.
