= Ayris =

Ayris is an English surname. Notable people with this name include:

- Cyril Ayris (born 1935), Australian journalist and author
- Imogen Ayris (born 2000), New Zealand pole vaulter
- Johnny Ayris (born 1953), English former football right winger
- Renae Ayris (born 1990), Australian dancer, model, and beauty pageant contestant
