= The Berlin Patient (podcast) =

Podcast hosted by Joel White

- Genre: Comedy

Cast and voices
- Hosted by: Joel White

Publication
- Original release: 2016 – 2017

The Berlin Patient is a podcast hosted by Australian comedian Joel White that ran from 2016 to 2017. The show is centred around unearthed recordings of White's rambling "audio postcards" to an ex-girlfriend that he originally recorded in Berlin during the aftermath of a breakup in 2010.

In each episode, White invites friends, fellow comedians, relatives and mental health professionals to listen back to the recordings with him and try to make sense of this period in his life, and the psychology of breakups in general.

As of 2024, the original podcast feed has gone dark and episodes no longer work on iTunes. However, the complete series has surfaced on YouTube and Internet Archive.

== Reception ==
The Berlin Patient was critically successful. By the release of its second episode, it was the second-most downloaded podcast in Australia. Ben McLeay of Pedestrian wrote that the show is "a cringeworthy, extremely funny, no-holds-barred look into just how fucking crazy we get after shit hits in the fan in a relationship." Mamamia's Jessie Stephens called the show "a time capsule, a moment in time, a completely raw depiction of what it's like to unravel after being dumped", and added that White was "more of a genius than even he realises." Olivia Lambert for News.com.au wrote that the show was "proof of somebody acting crazy due to a broken heart." The New York Post called the show "cringeworthy" and the result of "catastrophic mistakes." Paisley Gilmour of Cosmopolitan mentioned the show's "delightful personal topics including [White's] genitals, eating pizza, and how he was wearing her socks" and found the show "somewhere in between cute and creepy." White appeared on the Nathan, Nat and Shaun program on Nova 93.7 and was told by the hosts that "your misery makes us happy." He was also featured on the ABC programs Hack and The Drawing Room.
