= Premier's Multicultural Communications Awards =

Journalism awards in New South Wales, Australia

The Premier's Multicultural Communications Awards (PMCAs) are Australian journalism awards held each year by New South Wales Parliament and Multicultural NSW.

== History ==
The awards, originally known as Premier's Multicultural Media Awards, were established in 2012 to recognise excellence and professionalism in the multicultural media and marketing industry.

The awards were renamed Premier's Multicultural Communications Awards, or PMCAs, in 2018 to celebrate contributions that journalists, photographers, editors, publishers and marketers made to the multicultural communities in New South Wales.

== Description ==
The PMCAs are inclusive awards that have been establish to honour the work of individuals and media organisations that promote the advancement of multiculturalism in NSW and contributes to the enrichment of all sections of society through the benefits of cultural diversity. The gala events were normally held in the Sydney CBD and hosted by NSW Premier and Minister for Multiculturalism.

Due to the COVID-19 pandemic in Australia, the 2020 PMCAS were delivered fully online.

== Winners ==
=== 2019 ===
2019 winners are listed below.

Categories	Winners
Best Print Report	Zia Ahmad – AMUST
Best Audio Report	Manpreet Kaur Singh, Shamsher Kainth, Avneet Arora and Maya Jamieson – SBS Punjabi
Best Audio-Visual Report	Andrea Booth – NITV, The Point
Young Journalist of the Year	Xinrui (Rena) Li – Sydney Today
Best Use of Digital or Social Media	Sirine Demachkie and Kinderling Kids Radio – Mother Tongue
Public Interest Award	Avani Dias – triple j Hack
Alan Knight Student Award	Nadine Silva
Publication of the Year	AMUST
Lifetime Achievement Award	Antoine Kazzi OAM – El Telegraph
Campaign of the Year – Agency	Cultural Perspectives – Your vote will help shape Australia
Campaign of the Year – Business	SunRice and Identity Communications – SunRice the Rice Breaker
Campaign of the Year – Community	Hindu Council of Australia – Deepavali Fair

=== 2018 ===
2018 winners are listed below

Categories	Winners
Best News Report	Iman Riman and Maram Ismail – SBS Arabic24
Best Radio/Audio Report	Xiao Han – 2ac Australian Chinese Radio
Best TV/Audio-Visual Report	Sayed Hussainizada
Young Journalist of the Year	Sofia Dmitrieva – RusTalk TV
Best Use of Digital or Social Media	Why Documentaries
Public Interest Award	Natalia Godoy and Soraya Caicedo – SBS Spanish
Alan Knight Student Award	Ella Tang
Publication of the Year	Indian Link
Lifetime Achievement Award	Eduardo González – Cristóbal
Agency Campaign of the Year	The Monkeys for IAG/CGU
AFL NSW/ACT Community Campaign of the Year	Multicultural Communities Council of Illawarra (MCCI)
CBA Business Campaign of the Year	Havas Melbourne & SBS

=== 2017 ===
2017 winners are listed below

Categories	Winners
Best News Report	Joshua Levi – The Australian Jewish News
Best Radio/Audio Report	Soraya Caicedo, Esther Lozano, Claudianna Blanco – SBS Spanish
Best TV/Audio-Visual Report	Omar Dabbagh – SBS
Best Long-Form Feature	Trinh Nguyen and Olivia Nguyen – SBS
Young Journalist of the Year	Tia Singh
Best Use of Digital Media	Boris Etingof, Gina McKeon, John-Paul Marin and Matt Smith – SBS
Public Interest Award	Ben Hills, Simon Vandore and Marshall Heald – SBS
Student Award	Yenee Saw
Publication of the Year	The Australian Jewish News
Lifetime Achievement Award	Endre Csapo
Photo of the Year	Noel Kessel – The Australian Jewish News
Best Short-Form Feature	Michele Grigoletti and Silvia Pianelli – Migrantes Foundation
Best Editorial/Commentary	Vijay Badhwar – Indian Down Under

=== 2016 ===
Categories	Winners
Best Print Publication	The Australian Jewish News
Best Radio Report	Raymond Selvaraj and Kulasegaram Sanchayan – SBS Radio Tamil
Best Online Publication	Ang Kalatas
Best Use of Social and Digital Media	The Australian Jewish News
Best Community TV/Radio Report	Ana Sevo – Meraki TV
Best Investigative Story	Joshua Levi – The Australian Jewish News
Best News Report	Joshua Levi – The Australian Jewish News
Best Image	Noel Kessel – The Australian Jewish News
Best Long Form Feature	Francesca Rizzoli – SBS Radio
Best Editorial/Commentary	Zia Ahmad – Australasian Muslim Times
Best Creative and Innovative Design	Bernard Sullivan, Charles Sturt University
Best Story on Cultural Diversity	John Birmingham and Gina McKeon –SBS Australia
Best Student Work	Sejal Madan – Fiji Times
Emerging Journalist	Pri Kumar, The Indian Telegraph
Lifetime Achievement Award	Noel Kessel – The Australian Jewish News
Young Journalist of the Year	Tahmina Ansari

=== 2015 ===
2015 winners are listed below.

Categories	Winners
Best Print Publication	Indian Link Media Group
Best Radio Report	SBS Radio – Wolfgang Muller
Best Online Publication	Ang Kalatas
Young Journalist of the Year	Tahmina Ansari
Best Use of Online and Digital Media	SBS Australia
Public Interest Award	Ben Hills, Simon Vandore and Marshall Heald – SBS
Best Investigative Story	SBS Radio – Naomi Selvaratnam
Best Print Report	The Indian Telegraph
Lifetime Achievement Award	Kamahl Ibram
Best Image	The Australian Jewish News - Noel Kessel
Best Short-Form Feature	Michele Grigoletti and Silvia Pianelli – Migrantes Foundation
Best Editorial/Commentary	Youthink Magazine - Mostafa Rachwani
Best Community TV/Radio Report	Asian Media Centre - ‘Dragon Footprints’ series
Best Article on Multiculturalism	SBS – Dateline - Amos Roberts

=== 2014 ===
2014 winners are listed below.

Categories	Winners
Best Publication (One off publications)	Coalition of Mischief – A-Men
Best Publication (Periodicals)	Neos Kosmos
Best Print Report	Indian Link, Pawan Luthra — Election Survey Results
Best Radio Report	SBS Radio, Manpreet Kaur Singh and Sacha Payne — The Enemy Within
Young Journalist of the Year	Indian Link —Ritma Mitra
Best Use of Online and Digital Media	Indian Link Media Group
Best Online Publication	Ang Kalatas — kalatas.com.au
Best Investigative Story	SBS Radio, Florencia Melgar – The Other 9 -1
Lifetime Achievement Award	Quang Luu AO — former Head of SBS Radio
Best Feature of the Year	SBS Radio, Manpreet Kaur Singh and Sacha Payne – The Enemy Within
Best Editorial/Commentary	Australian Jewish News, Zeddy Lawrence – Enough is Enough
Best Community TV/Radio Report	South West Multicultural and Community Centre – Pacific Sport 360
Best Article on Multiculturalism	Beyond the Bridge Inc, David Ossip – A Nation of Tribes

=== 2013 ===
2013 winners are listed below. Three hundred guests joined the then Premier and the Minister for Citizenship at the inaugural awards ceremony on 27 February 2013.

Categories	Winners
Best News Report	Indian Link
Best Print Report	Zaman
Best Radio Report	SBS Radio Hindi programs
Best Use of Online and Digital Media	Indian Link Media Group
Best Online Publication	Indian Link
Best Investigative Story	SBS World News Australia
Lifetime Achievement Award	Anwar Harb (An Nahar) Simon Ko (Sing Tao)
Best Image	Indian Link
Best Feature	Write About Me by Ms Naomi Tsvirko, a freelance journalist Antoine Kazzi, El Telegraph
Best Editorial/Commentary	Hani Elturk, EI Telegraph
Best Article on Multiculturalism	SBS Radio Turkish program SBS Radio German program
