= Arthur Lovekin Prize in Journalism =

Annual journalism award in Western Australia

The Arthur Lovekin Prize for Excellence in Journalism is an annual journalism award in Western Australia. The Prize was established with the University of Western Australia in 1928 by journalist, newspaper owner and politician, Arthur Lovekin, who endowed £100 to provide an annual prize for students taking the diploma course for Journalism. The annual prize, initially of £5/5/-, was given to the most successful student, providing there was a student of sufficient merit. It has been awarded since 1929.

Since then the prize has been opened to all undergraduate and postgraduate students enrolled at UWA and to members of the Western Australian branch of the Australian Journalists' Association 'Media' section of the Media, Entertainment & Arts Alliance. Currently, the winner receives $200 and a medal. The Prize "…is awarded to the writer of the contribution which, in the opinion of the examiners, is the best contribution of the year by a Western Australian journalist published in an Australian newspaper or periodical produced, published or circulated in Western Australia."

Each candidate for the prize can submit only one contribution for consideration. The year is from 1 July to 30 June, but a candidate may submit for consideration a continuing story concerning a connected series of events, provided that the story commences prior to 30 June and is completed not later than 15 July.

The judges are the Discipline Chair of the Media and Communication discipline or nominee; a professor of Media Communications, or nominee; and a representative of the Media Section of the Media, Entertainment & Arts Alliance.

== Winners ==
- 1929: Paul Hasluck
- 1930: Paul Hasluck
- 1931: Kenneth McKenna
- 1932: Albert Edwin Dunstan
- 1933: Noel L. Ottaway
- 1934: Noel L. Ottaway
- 1935: Gabriel Parry
- 1936: Norman Bartlett
- 1937: No prize awarded
- 1938: No prize awarded
- 1939: G.C. Lefroy
- 1940: G.J. Odgers
- 1941: No prize awarded
- 1942: No prize awarded
- 1943: No prize awarded
- 1944: No prize awarded
- 1945: No prize awarded
- 1946: Douglas Royston Pratt
- 1947: R.G. Clarke
- 1948: J.E. Coulter
- 1949: C.W. Henderson
- 1950: J.N. Broun
- 1951: Hugh Schmitt
- 1952: Norman Milne
- 1953: J.L.G. Marshall
- 1954: No prize awarded
- 1955: N.C. Braidwood
- 1956: No prize awarded
- 1957: John Payne
- 1958: No prize awarded
- 1959: No prize awarded
- 1960: No prize awarded
- 1961: No prize awarded
- 1962: Lloyd Marshall
- 1963: Hugh Edwards
- 1964: James Henderson
- 1965: John McIlwraith
- 1966: Philip Bodeker
- 1967: Catherine Martin. Peter Ellery. Joint winners.
- 1968: Peter J. Finn
- 1969: Catherine Martin
- 1970: Caroline Plummer. J. McIlwraith. Awarded jointly.
- 1971: J. Lloyd G. Marshall. Robert Pullan. Awarded jointly.
- 1972: Ian L. Hummerstone
- 1973: Catherine Martin
- 1974: Charles Amery.
- 1975: Catherine Martin. David Warren awarded second prize.
- 1976: Bret Christian
- 1977: unknown
- 1978: Michael Zekulich
- 1979: Catherine Martin
- 1980: Andre Malan
- 1981-1984: unknown
- 1985: Paul Murray
- 1986: Cyril Ayris
- 1987: Unknown
- 1988: Martin Saxon
- 1989: Robyn Cash
- 1990: Cyril Ayris
- 1991: Mike van Niekerk
- 1992: Mark Thornton
- 1993: Brendan Nicholson
- 1994: Marnie McKimmie
- 1995: Margot Lang
- 1996: Vanessa Gould
- 1997: Michael Day
- 1998: Norman Aisbett
- 1999: Bevan Eakins
- 2000: Kim Macdonald
- 2001: John Flint
- 2002: Colleen Egan & Victoria Laurie
- 2003: John Flint
- 2004: Bret Christian
- 2005: Steve Pennells
- 2006: Steve Pennells
- 2007: Steve Pennells
- 2008: George Williams
- 2009: Gary Adshead
- 2010: Paige Taylor. Gary Adshead & Sean Cowan. Co-winners.
- 2011: Marnie McKimmie, Cathy O’Leary & Angela Pownall
- 2012: Paige Taylor
- 2013: Steve Pennells
- 2014: John Flint
- 2015: Paige Taylor & Natasha Robinson
- 2016: David Cohen
- 2017: No prize awarded
- 2018: Tony Barrass
- 2019: Nathan Hondros
- 2020: Annabel Hennessy
- 2021: Aja Styles
- 2022: Peter de Kruijff
- 2023: John Flint
- 2024: Kathryn Diss
- 2025: Emma Young
- 2026: Carla Hildebrandt
