= 2019 Australian Women in Music Awards =

Edition of annual Australian Women in Music Awards

- Date: 9 October 2019
- Venue: Brisbane Powerhouse, Brisbane, Queensland

Highlights
- Most wins: Tashi Hall, Christine Anu (2)
- Most nominations: Ngaiire (3)
- Website: womeninmusicawards.com.au

The 2019 Australian Women in Music Awards was the second Australian Women in Music Awards. The event took place on 9 October 2019. 15 award categories were presented, including new awards for Excellence in Classical Music, Excellence in Image Making and Music Journalism. The Educator Award, Auriel Andrew Memorial Award and Musical Excellence Award were retired.

== AWMA Honour Roll ==
- Judith Durham

== Nominees and winners ==
=== AWMA Awards ===
Winners indicated in boldface, with other nominees in plain.

Full list of nominees
Lifetime Achievement Award	Humanitarian Award
**Joy McKean**; Marcia Hines; Vika and Linda Bull	**Dami Im**; Alison Hams; Lindy Morrison
Diversity in Music Award	Studio Production Award
**Christine Anu**; Lisa Cheney & Peggy Polias (Making Waves); Ngaiire	**Virginia Read**; Elise Reitze-Swensen (Feels); Kathy Naunton
Live Production Award	Music Leadership Award
**Laurie May**; Jenny Moon; Kait Hall	**Sue Telfer**; Elise Reitze-Swensen; Lynette Irwin
Songwriter Award	Emerging Artist Award
**Mojo Juju**; Ngaiire; Thelma Plum	**Alice Skye**; Ella Fence; Lisa Caruso
Music Photographer Award	Film-maker Award
**Tashi Hall**; Jessica Vaini; Kerrie Geier	**Tashi Hall**; Aimée-Lee Xu; Hsien Curran
Artistic Excellence Award	Creative Leadership Award
**Christine Anu**; Nai Palm; Ngaiire	**Katie Noonan**; Claire Edwardes; Elaine Chia
Excellence in Classical Music Award	Music Journalist Award
**Caroline Almonte**; Claire Edwardes; Sarah-Grace William	**Ange McCormack**; Jane Gazzo; Jules LeFevre
Excellence in Image Making Award	
**Melaine Knight**; Chloe Jean; Ntombi Moyo	
