= Sophie McNeill =

Australian politician (born 1985)

The Honourable Sophie McNeill MLC
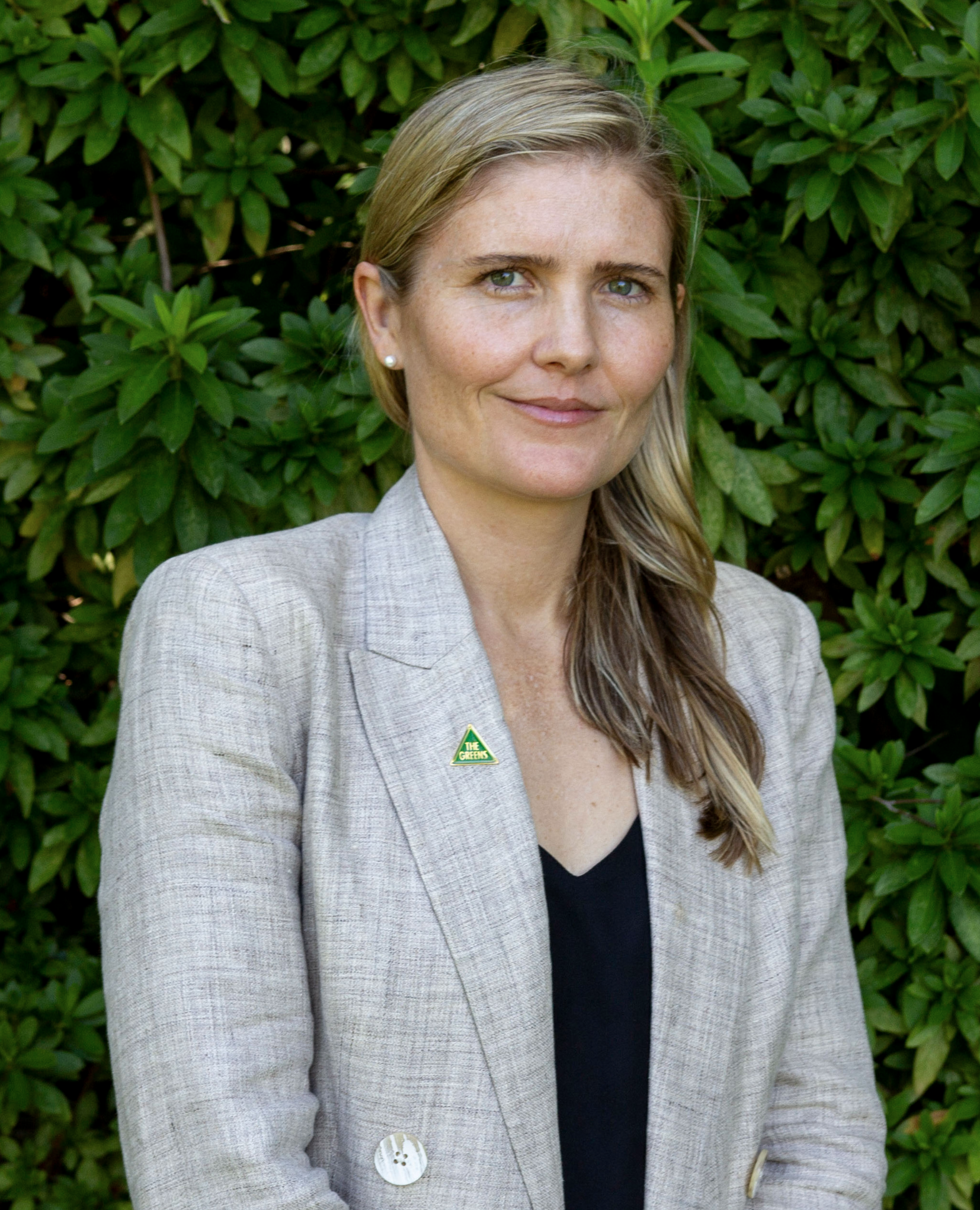

Member of the Western Australian Legislative Council
- Incumbent
- Assumed office 22 May 2025

Personal details
- Born: 1985 (age 40–41) Bunbury, Western Australia
- Party: Greens (WA)
- Occupation: Politician, journalist, television presenter, author, human rights activist, campaigner
- Website: https://greens.org.au/wa/person/sophie-mcneill

Sophie McNeill is an Australian politician, journalist, television presenter, author, human rights activist, and campaigner. She is known for her work in conflict zones and as a senior campaigner for Greenpeace Australia Pacific. McNeill is also the inaugural Australian researcher for Human Rights Watch, where she advocated for climate justice, asylum seekers, and to prevent transnational repression. In 2025, she was elected to the Western Australian Legislative Council as a candidate for the Greens (WA).

== Early life and career ==
McNeill began her career in documentaries in 2001. Her first film, which highlighted the health crisis in post-liberation East Timor, earned her the Western Australia’s Young Person of the Year Award.

In 2003, her investigation into the death of an asylum seeker held under Australia's mandatory detention policy won her multiple awards, including the Media, Entertainment, and Arts Alliance's Student Journalist of the Year Award, Best Newcomer at the West Australian Media Awards and Best Emerging Director at the West Australian Screen Awards.

McNeill was also a finalist in the New York Film Festival for her 2005 story Shoot the Messenger, which focused on the shooting of an unarmed, wounded Iraqi in a Fallujah mosque by an American soldier.

== Journalism career ==
McNeill worked as a reporter for the Australian Broadcasting Corporation's (ABC) investigative program Four Corners, where she produced stories on global issues such as the Hong Kong protest movement and the mass arbitrary detention of Muslims in Xinjiang by the Chinese government.

As a foreign correspondent for both ABC and SBS, she covered conflict zones across the Middle East, including Iraq, Syria, Yemen, Gaza, and the occupied West Bank. She was twice named Australian Young TV Journalist of the Year and won a Walkley Award in 2010 for her investigation into the deaths of five Afghan children by Australian special forces soldiers.

In 2015, McNeill was nominated for a Walkley Award for her coverage of the Syrian refugee crisis. Later, she was recognised for helping reunite a Syrian refugee family that had become separated on the European refugee trail.

In 2016, McNeill won two more Walkley Awards for her coverage of the ongoing conflicts in Yemen and Syria.

Previously, she worked as a reporter for Foreign Correspondent and Dateline, and was a former host of Hack on Triple J radio.

== Activism and advocacy ==
From 2020 to 2023, McNeill was the inaugural Australia researcher for Human Rights Watch. She focused on advocating for climate justice, treatment of asylum seekers and deaths in custody. McNeill’s work contributed to influencing change on these human rights issues.

She also served as a senior campaigner at Greenpeace Australia Pacific, where she led campaigns against the expansion of gas projects in Western Australia, including efforts to stop Woodside Energy from pursuing new gas developments.

In 2020, McNeill published her first book, We Can't Say We Didn't Know: Dispatches from an Age of Impunity, which was shortlisted for both the Walkley Book Award and the Premier’s Prize for an Emerging Writer at the 2020 Western Australian Premier's Book Awards.

== Politics ==
=== State Parliament (2025–present) ===
In 2024, McNeill was selected as a candidate for the Greens (WA) in the 2025 Western Australian state election, running for the Western Australian Legislative Council. She was elected in the 2025 election, marking the beginning of her political career.

McNeill has expressed her commitment to advancing climate action, human rights, and social justice as her primary political goals.

McNeill spoke against the Land Forces Event (Special Power) Bill that was passed in September 2026. The legislation grants police special powers to ban people, stop and search people and remove face coverings within a zone adjacent to the October 2026 Land Forces defence and weapons expo. Under the legislation homeless people would be removed from the zone and an excluded-persons list of people would be barred from entering the event. McNeill said "WA Labor chose to restrict the rights of Western Australians and ensure that the murderous weapons companies attending this arms fair didn’t have to hear or see anyone opposed to their presence. The provisions in this bill create deeply alarming and dangerous precedents that could have lasting repercussions for Western Australians’ ability to peacefully protest". Military suppliers Boeing, BAE Systems, Thales, and Israeli arms producer Rafael Advanced Defence Systems displayed their weapons at the expo.

== Personal life ==
McNeill is a mother of two, and lives in WA. Outside of her work in journalism and activism, McNeill is passionate about environmental sustainability and human rights. She enjoys travelling and continues to advocate for social justice and climate action.

== Publications ==
- We Can't Say We Didn’t Know: Dispatches from an Age of Impunity (2020)

== Awards and recognition ==
- Walkley Award (2010) – For her investigation into the deaths of Afghan children by Australian Special Forces soldiers
- Walkley Award (2016) – For coverage of Yemen and besieged towns in Syrias
- Australian Young TV Journalist of the Year – Twice awarded
- New York Film Festival Finalist – For her documentary Shoot the Messenger
