= Meraki =

Meraki may refer to:

- Cisco Meraki, a cloud-managed IT company
- Meraki TV, a lifestyle show for Greeks living in Australia

== See also ==
- Muraki (disambiguation)
