= Charles Macfaull =

Australian newspaper publisher

Charles Macfaull (1800 – 13 Dec 1846) was an early settler in the Swan River Colony in Western Australia. He arrived in 1830, and is credited with having planted the colony's first vineyard, using vines brought from the Cape of Good Hope. He worked as the colony's postmaster, and in 1833 established its first successful newspaper, (Note: Several short-lived newspapers had previously been published.) the Perth Gazette and Western Australian Times, which survives today as The West Australian. The original printing press, a tiny Ruthven press that was used to prepare the first paper, is currently housed in the Western Australian Museum.

He was the subject of the first book printed in Western Australia. Entitled A report of the late trial for libel !!! : Clarke versus Macfaul, 4 September 1835, (Note: The book title spells both surnames incorrectly.) it gives William Nairne Clark's account of the successful libel suit against Macfaull. William Narine Clark was a competing publisher to Macfaull. The text concerns a court settlement in favour of a Captain Clark, of the vessel Skerne, whose seamanship had been questioned in the pages of the Perth Gazette. A letter of apology was refused by Clark and the court's determination found the publication was slanderous in their comments on the captain and the proprietor Charles Macfaull was ordered to pay £21 in damages. The work has been noted by academic Geoffrey Bolton and others as the first publication in Western Australia.

Macfaull died on 13 December 1846 in Perth. He was survived by his wife, Elizabeth, who took on the ongoing role of publishing the Perth Gazette.
