= Peter Kennedy (journalist) =

Australian journalist and presenter

Peter St John Kennedy AM (born 1942/43) is an Australian political commentator and retired journalist.

== Early life ==
Kennedy's father, Tom, was a public servant and worked part-time as a football and cricket writer for The Sunday Times. His mother Patricia (nee Lang), was a private secretary with a Perth probate firm before marriage. Kennedy attended Aquinas College from 1957 to 1959.

== Career ==
After leaving school, he worked in the library at The West Australian newspaper in 1960, but was unable to get a cadetship. He then studied at the University of Western Australia, where he graduated with a bachelor of arts (economics) and a diploma of education. Following that, he became a high school teacher, at Bunbury Senior High School, and a lecturer in economics at Leederville Technical College. He joined The West Australian as a journalist in 1970. In 1977, he moved to The Sydney Morning Herald, first as its state political correspondent in Sydney and later as its chief of staff in the Canberra Press Gallery. In 1984, he became Press Secretary to Deputy Premier of Western Australia Mal Bryce, and rejoined The West Australian from 1986-1990. He then joined the Australian Broadcasting Corporation, where presented the Morning and Drive programs on ABC Radio Perth.

In 1995, Kennedy was awarded the Clarion Prize at the WA Media Awards. He became state political reporter for ABC News in 2000 and held the post until he retired from daily journalism in 2010. He continued as a political commentator, including writing the Political Perspective column for the weekly (now fortnightly) Business News. magazine. In 2011, he was appointed adjunct professor in communications and media at the University of Notre Dame Australia.

Kennedy was appointed Member of the Order of Australia in the 2025 Australia Day Honours for "significant service to the print and broadcast media as a journalist".

== Books ==
Kennedy wrote Tales from Boom Town, a book about the premiers of Western Australia from David Brand to Colin Barnett. It was published in 2014 by UWA Press. An updated version was released in 2019, covering Mark McGowan as well.
