= Andre Malan (journalist) =

Australian journalist (1947–2014)

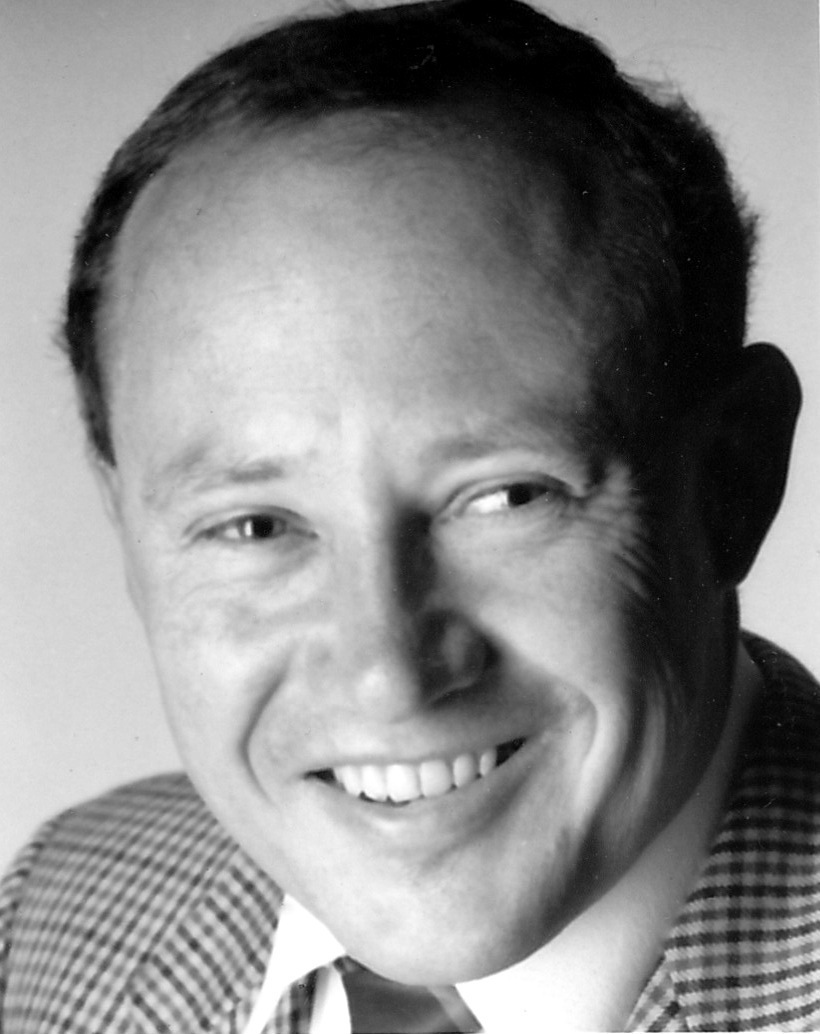
- Malan's file photograph in The West Australian
- Born: Andre Arthur Malan; 23 May 1947; Roodepoort, Gauteng, South Africa
- Died: 26 September 2014 (aged 67)
- Occupation: Journalist
- Awards: Arthur Lovekin Prize in Journalism (1980)

Andre Arthur Malan (23 May 1947 – 26 September 2014) was an Australian journalist and features-editor of The West Australian and The Western Mail newspapers in Perth, Western Australia.

Born in Roodepoort, South Africa on 23 May 1947, Malan studied at Jeppe High School in Johannesburg, graduating in 1964 and was awarded cadet of the year at The Star afternoon newspaper there.

Malan migrated to Australia in 1968, arriving at Fremantle Passenger Terminal at 6 am and commenced employment with The West Australian at 2 pm the same day.

In 1980 he won the Arthur Lovekin Journalism Prize for his expose of fugitive financier Christo Moll.

Over a forty-year career, Malan was chief of staff, interstate bureau chief, and investigative journalist. In the 1990s he established and wrote for the "Asia Desk" supplement of The West Australian, travelling and reporting extensively on South East Asian affairs. Before retiring in 2007, he wrote a popular twice-weekly column in The West Australian.

He wrote a chapter of the 2009 University of Western Australia publication An enduring friendship: Western Australia and Japan - Past, Present and Future, edited by David Black and Sachiko Sone.

Malan died suddenly on 26 September 2014 from a pulmonary embolism due to recent surgery.
