= Frederick Flood (photographer) =

Australian photographer (1881–1965)

Frederick William Flood (1881–1965) was an English born Australian photographer who worked for The West Australian newspaper in Perth Western Australia between the 1920s and 1940s.

He was the newspaper's first full-time staff photographer; many of his photographs were also featured in the Western Mail.

The range of photographs taken while working for the newspaper included many photographs in the rural regions of the Wheatbelt and South West.

In the 1930s, photographs by Flood and the illustrations of Amy Heap dominated the Christmas editions of the Western Mail.

Flood was also an accomplished artist.

In 2016, a Museum of Perth project was able to locate and list over 270 items relating to Flood on the Trove catalogue.
