= William Nairne Clark =

(1804–1854) lawyer and publicist

William Nairne Clark (1804–1854) was a public notary and publisher, active at the Swan River Colony and Tasmanian settlements founded in Australia.

The son of Charles Clark of Princeland, he was born in Scotland at Coupar Angus, Perthshire, to Marjory, née Barclay. His great uncle, advocate and judge William Nairne (Lord Dunsinane), provided his early education at Dunsinnan House in Collace, and he studied law to become appointed a life long public notary. Amongst the recognition of his works and contributions, aside from the contemporary notability of his firsts in publishing and duelling, he is noted by Dominic Serventy and Hubert Whittell in the seminal work Birds of Western Australia (1948, et seq) as having published observations on birds of Southwest Australia and the first list of its avifauna. His poetry has occasionally been selected for anthologies of historic prose or republished in Australian newspapers.

== First duel in Western Australia ==
He arrived at Fremantle, Western Australia aboard Eliza in March 1831 and began to practice law there. Clark engaged briefly with George French Johnson (1799–1832) in a publishing venture known as The Inquisitor. Clark shortly accused Johnson of "clandestine transactions". After a verbal altercation on the street the two met to duel at Richmond House on the morning of the seventeenth of August, 1832, and Johnson was killed in the first duel recorded in the state; Clark was tried and cleared of the charge of manslaughter that followed.

== Report of the Late Trial for Libel!!! ==
He later began to draw on his experience in journalism to begin publishing in the new colony, his brief work Report of the Late Trial for Libel!!! Clarke versus MacFaul (Fremantle, 1835), (Note: Both names are noted misspelled in the title; "Clarke" is Captain Clark and "Macfaul" is Charles Macfaull (de garis, Bolton, LISWA).) has been noted by academic Geoffrey Bolton and others as the first publication in Western Australia. The text concerns a court settlement in favour of a Captain Clark, of the vessel Skerne, whose seamanship had been questioned in the pages of the Perth Gazette. A letter of apology was refused by Clark and the court's determination found the publication was slanderous in their comments on the captain and the proprietor Charles Macfaull was ordered to pay £21 in damages. The work was produced on a Ruthven printing press that had been delivered to the colony in 1831, from Tasmania; the printer was W. T. Graham of Fremantle.

== Journalism: Aboriginal relations ==
This book was followed by his contributions to another newspaper, Swan River Guardian, and he eventually assumed editorial control of that publication between 1836 and 1838. The Guardian was a competitor to the Perth Gazette, joining the alternatives that were a politically influential feature of the new colony's print media. Clark's criticism was often directed at the political elite, the acting governor Frederick Irwin, Peter Broun and George Fletcher Moore; his criticism of James Stirling was later tempered to a view that he was a good man misled by others. The ex-catholic cum missionary Louis Giustiniani, who returned from a tour of York decrying the murderous treatment of the Aboriginal Australians he had been appointed to Christianise, entered into an alliance with Clark to denounce the governor and gentry at Perth in his Swan River Guardian. After a series of violent acts or reprisals, the popular sentiment of the colonists was challenged by Clark in an editorial that suggested the outcome of any war was the certain destruction of one or the other of the parties and ought to be dreaded by both.

== Journalism: trade unionism ==
Clark sought to present himself as a people's champion, so was strident in his criticism of what he portrayed as an aristocratic elite. In reporting the meeting of the Western Australian Agricultural Society, he proposed the organisation of tradesmen and employees in response to the elites, "labourers, mechanics etc., ought to form a Society of their own for the protection of mutual rights, and send quarterly reports to the Secretary of State …".

The Guardian ended in 1838, unable to operate without a loss, and his next attempt to establish an alternative to the Gazette was the Political Register; this was also unable to provide the required £200 that the state had recently enacted, purportedly to provide surety if charges of libel were won by a plaintiff. Clark's family was also suffering loss at this time; his son, Charles, aged four years and five months, died 7 May 1838, following the death of his sister, Anne Catharine, 8 April of the same year, falling short of her second birthday.

== Land grant ==
A land grant of 1,900 hectares (4,600 acres) was given to Clark and a Mr. C. Spyers at Wadjemup (Rottnest Island), west of Fremantle, and in the district around inland York to the east of the settlers' establishment at Perth, Western Australia. He attempted to start the societies first suggested in the pages of the Guardian before its demise; these were founded as the "Shephards' Club" and "Mutual Protection Society" to address established grievances with employers, but did not appear to continue beyond 1843.

== Exploring southwards ==
He journeyed to explore the southern regions between King George Sound (Albany) and Kojonup during the period 1840 to 1842. He was helped in this work by sealers and whalers in the region who provided him with boats, provisions and information.

== Tasmania and death ==
Clark left for Tasmania at the end of 1848, where no warranted official was available for his recognition as a public notary and he instead resumed a career in journalism at the colony. The uncertain report of his death on 15 February 1854 was not recorded by the Registrar-General's Department. His death notice in the Hobart newspaper The Courier gave his birthplace as "Coupar Angus", as formerly at the Colonist and his place of death as H. M. General Hospital of Hobart town on 19 February 1854.

== General references ==
- C. T. Stannage, ed. (1 December 1981). A New History of Western Australia. Nedlands: UWA Publishing. ISBN 0-85564-181-9. LCCN 82101009. OCLC 963830667. OL 3517729M. Wikidata Q125995168.
