= Avani Dias =

Australian journalist and radio presenter

- Born: 15 November 1991 (age 34); Wattle Grove, New South Wales, Australia
- Occupations: Journalist; radio presenter
- Years active: 2015–present
- Known for: Hosting Hack on Triple J

Avani Dias (born 15 November 1991) is an Australian journalist and radio presenter. She was the Australian Broadcasting Corporation (ABC)'s international foreign correspondent for South Asia, based in New Delhi until April 2024. She will join Four Corners as a reporter after returning to Australia. Dias presented the current affairs program Hack on youth radio station Triple J from 2020 to 2021, after succeeding Tom Tilley at the end of 2019.

Raised in South Western Sydney, Dias completed her tertiary education at the University of Sydney, where she wrote for the student newspaper Honi Soit. In her early career, she worked at independent radio station FBi Radio and the online newspaper The New Daily whilst also working as a production assistant at the ABC. Dias received a cadetship at ABC News in 2015, becoming a video-journalist and later anchoring the Darwin 7PM News bulletin.

Dias has won and been nominated for various journalistic awards, including Public Interest Award at the New South Wales Premier's Multicultural Communications Awards in 2019.

== Early life and education ==
Avani Dias was born on 15 November 1991, in Wattle Grove, New South Wales. Dias grew up in the south west of Sydney, Australia. The elder of two siblings, Dias has one brother, Seth. Dias' mother is also a journalist at the ABC.

She completed her secondary schooling at Bankstown Grammar School in 2009, and completed her tertiary education at the University of Sydney. In early 2013, she was elected as one of ten editors for the university's student newspaper Honi Soit.

== Career ==
Dias began her career with FBi Radio, which she credits as giving her "a start in media". Dias began working at the Australian Broadcasting Corporation (ABC) as a production assistant, before being awarded a cadetship with ABC News in 2015. She went on to work as a multi-platform and video-journalist for the ABC in Sydney and Darwin, later anchoring the Darwin 7PM News bulletin. In December 2019, Dias was announced as the new radio presenter for current affairs program Hack on the ABC's youth-focused radio station Triple J, which she hosted until December 2021. In 2021 it was announced that Dias would relocate to New Delhi to serve as the ABC's foreign correspondent for South East Asia.

Dias additionally wrote for The New Daily from 2015 to 2017.

Her 2024 report for Foreign Correspondent, entitled Sikhs, Spies and Murder, investigated the alleged assassination by India of Hardeep Singh Nijjar in Canada. India blocked the report on YouTube and said it would refuse to extend Dias' visa to stay in India. After a request from the Australian government, Dias' visa was extended for two months, but she decided to return to Australia because she said the pressure placed on her by Modi's government made it difficult to work in India. She will join Four Corners as a reporter on her return to Australia.

She became embroiled in a controversy in June 2024 following the release of a video documentary titled "The story behind India’s Narendra Modi." In this video, Dias incorrectly claimed that the Indian Constitution included the word "secular" since its inception in 1947. On June 27, 2024, ABC News issued a clarification, admitting that Dias's claim was false. The broadcaster acknowledged that while the Supreme Court of India affirmed secularism as a basic feature of the 1950 Constitution during the 1960s, the word "secular" was only officially added to the Preamble in 1976 through the 42nd Constitutional Amendment during Prime Minister Indira Gandhi's tenure.

== Awards and nominations ==
=== New South Wales Premier's Multicultural Communications Awards ===
| Year | Nominee / work | Award | Result | Ref. |
|---|---|---|---|---|
| 2019 | Premier's Multicultural Communications Awards | Public Interest Award | Won | |

=== Walkley Awards ===
| Year | Nominee / work | Award | Result | Ref. |
|---|---|---|---|---|
| 2019 | Walkley Awards | Young Australian Journalist of the Year | Nominated | |
| 2020 | Walkley Awards | Radio/Audio News and Current Affairs | Nominated | |
| 2021 | Walkley Awards | Public Service Journalism Award | Nominated | |

=== NT Press Club Awards ===
| Year | Nominee / work | Award | Result | Ref. |
|---|---|---|---|---|
| 2016 | NT Press Club Awards | Young Journalist of the Year | Won | |
