= Steve Pennells =

Steve Pennells (born 1971) is an Australian journalist.

In 2012, Pennells was awarded the Gold Walkley. Pennells received the award in recognition for his work at The West Australian, specifically a series of articles about asylum seekers and for his reports on the conflict between Australian mining magnate Gina Rinehart and her children.

Pennells won a legal battle with Rinehart in the Supreme Court of Western Australia in 2013 after she had served a subpoena, attempting to expose Pennells' sources by accessing confidential documents and communications, specifically between Pennells and her son John. In what was considered to be the first test of Australia's shield laws, Justice Janine Pritchard described the subpoena as oppressive and an abuse of process, stating that if Pennells' sources had been disclosed it would have been a breach of a journalist's "fundamental ethical obligation". The ramifications of the decision were widely discussed in Australia.

In 2013, Pennells joined the Seven Network's weekly current affairs program, Sunday Night. Pennells hosted a Seven News special in 2016, Anita: You Thought You Knew It All.

Pennells was among 48 Australian journalists who were inducted into the Australian Media Hall of Fame in November 2018.
