= Muraki (surname) =

Muraki (written: 村木 lit. "village tree") is a Japanese surname. Notable people with the surname include:

- Maki Muraki (村木 真紀, born 1974), Japanese LGBT activist
- Shinobu Muraki (村木 忍, 1923–1997), Japanese production designer and art director
- Yoshirō Muraki (村木 与四郎, 1924–2009), Japanese production designer, art director and costume designer
- Yukito Muraki (村木 征人, born 1945), Japanese triple jumper

== Fictional characters ==
- Kazutaka Muraki (邑輝 一貴), a character in the manga series Descendants of Darkness
