= Cyril Ayris =

Western Australian historian and journalist

Cyril Ayris (born 1935) is an author from Western Australia who has, after a long career in journalism, written books on both topical and historical subjects.

== Life ==
He is the son of Charles Ayris of Gainsborough, Lincolnshire, England, and his wife Phyllis Futter .He attended primary school in Lea. The family then emigrated to New Zealand around 1950, with Phyllis's parents. Cyril worked on a sheep station before moving to Australia.

As a journalist with The West Australian newspaper in Perth, he won two Arthur Lovekin Prize in Journalism awards, retiring in 1993. His stories were at stages also carried in other newspapers.

Most items published by him after the 1990s list his status as Cyril Ayris freelance.

== Works ==
His books include:

- Fremantle Prison: A brief history (1985)
- John Forrest: Man of legend (1986)
- C. Y. O'Connor: The man for the time (1996)
- ANZACS at Gallipoli (1997)
- All the Bull's men : No. 2 Australian Independent Company (2/2nd Commando Squadron) (1997)
- Bob Marshall: My Life and Times
- Duty done / Colin Russell Leith as told to Cyril Ayris
- Squadron-Leader Robert Milton MC : the man who stayed behind : a biography as told to Cyril Ayris
- A question of duty : a biography as told to Cyril Ayris / [by] Alan King
- Dave the brave / as told by Cyril Ayris (David Dicks)
- Leeuwin Lighthouse - A Brief History (1996)
- A Heritage ingrained : a history of Co-operative Bulk Handling Ltd. 1933-2000 (1999)
- Gulf to Gulf - The Long Walk : Jeff Johnson, as told to Cyril Ayris (2009)
