= Catherine Martin (journalist) =

Australian journalist (1919–2009)

Catherine Martin MBE
- Born: 1918; London, England
- Died: 17 April 2009 (aged 91); Perth, Western Australia
- Occupation: Journalist
- Known for: Reporting the impact of asbestos–related diseases on the mining community in Wittenoom Gorge
- Awards: Gold Walkley (1978)

Catherine Ellen Martin MBE (1918 – 17 April 2009) was a journalist for The West Australian newspaper from 1957, specialising in medical reporting. The winner of the inaugural Gold Walkley, Martin is known for her reporting the impact of asbestos–related diseases on the mining community in Wittenoom Gorge that led to the company James Hardie being found in the Supreme Court of New South Wales guilty of misleading conduct and failing to meet its obligations over its handling of asbestos compensation.

== Biography ==
Martin was born in London, England in the United Kingdom and emigrated to Western Australia together with her Czech–born husband. Following his premature death and faced with the challenge of raising three children, Martin sought and gained work with The Western Australian.

In 1978 she began investigating the high incidence of death and disease among workers at the Australian Blue Asbestos mine at Wittenoom Gorge. Martin was able to access a study by Professor Michael Hobbs, a University of Western Australia epidemiologist, of the mine workers and their families. This study found a high incidence of illness and death from asbestos-related diseases among the small number of workers in the sample.

Between 1947 and 1967 when the mine was closed more than 6500 people had been employed at Wittenoom. Nearly half the workers had been European migrants, some of whom had returned to their homelands.

In 1978 the effects of pleural abnormalities and other asbestos-related diseases were beginning to show up in the former mine workers. Martin's front-page story for The West Australian won a Walkley award and she produced a series of another nine articles highlighting the impact on workers and their families.

== Awards ==
Martin was appointed a Member of the Order of the British Empire (MBE) on 12 June 1982 for services to medical journalism. She had won numerous awards for journalism including the Walkley four times, the Arthur Lovekin Prize in Journalism five times, and a number of Australian Medical Association awards. Martin received the inaugural Gold Walkley in 1978.

== Legacy ==
The Judith Neilson Institute Journalist-in-Residence Program named one of its two positions after Martin.

== See also ==
- Walkley Awards
