= Swan River Guardian =

The Swan River Guardian was a newspaper published in Perth, Western Australia from 1836 to 1838.

== History ==
The Swan River Guardian was published in Perth from October 6, 1836 until October 22, 1838. It was published every Thursday. From 1836 it was edited by William Nairne Clark and printed and published by Charles Bourne Sole; from 1838 it was edited, printed and published by Clark. A total of 64 issues were published.

The other weekly newspaper that was being published at the same time in Perth was The Perth Gazette and Western Australian Journal, which was established at the beginning of 1833.

== See also ==
- List of newspapers in Australia
- List of newspapers in Western Australia
