= Western Mail (Western Australia) =

Australian newspapers

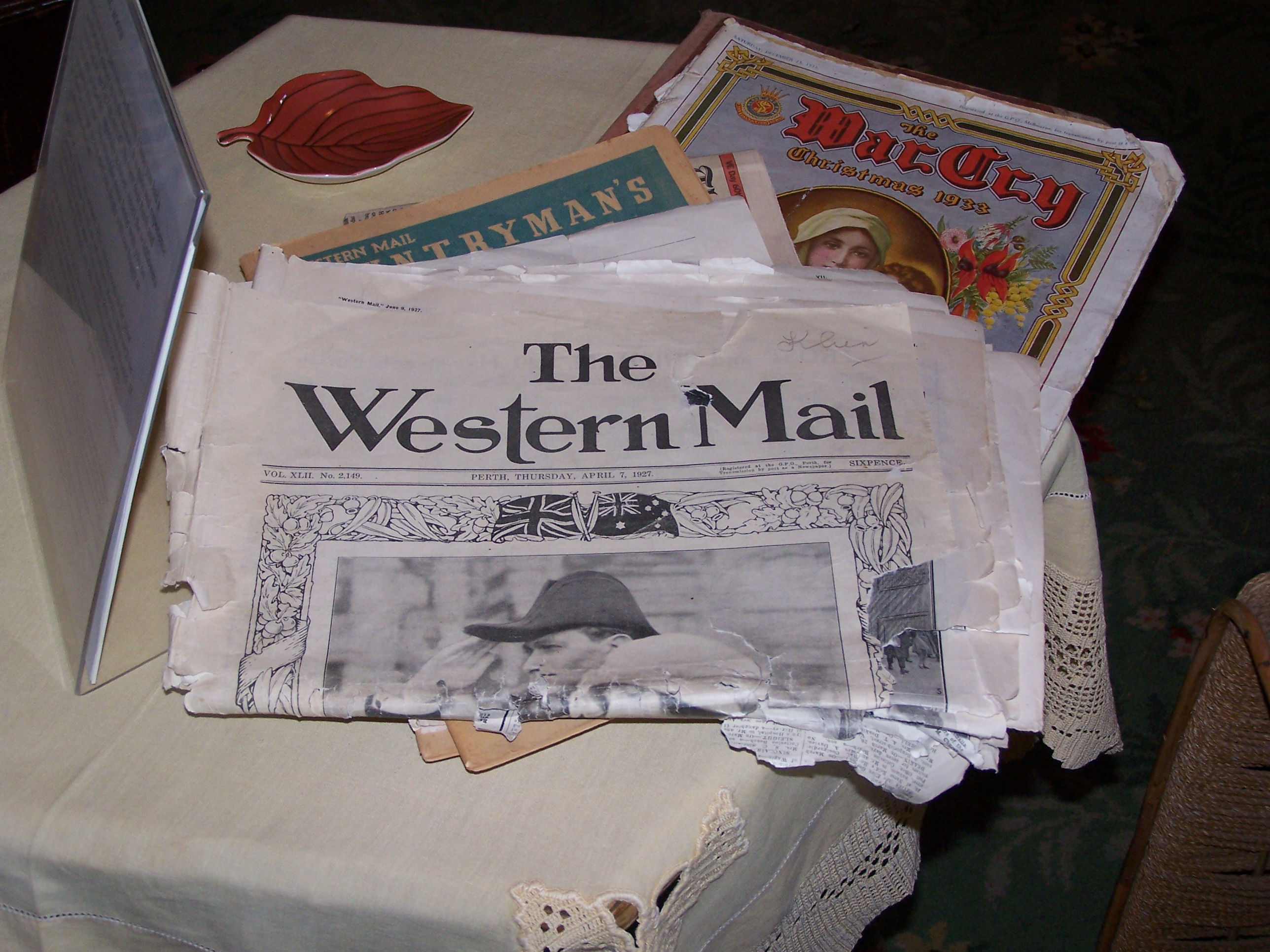
7 April 1927 edition, with the Countryman behind

The Western Mail, or Western Mail, was the name of two weekly newspapers published in Perth, Western Australia.

== Published 1885–1955 ==
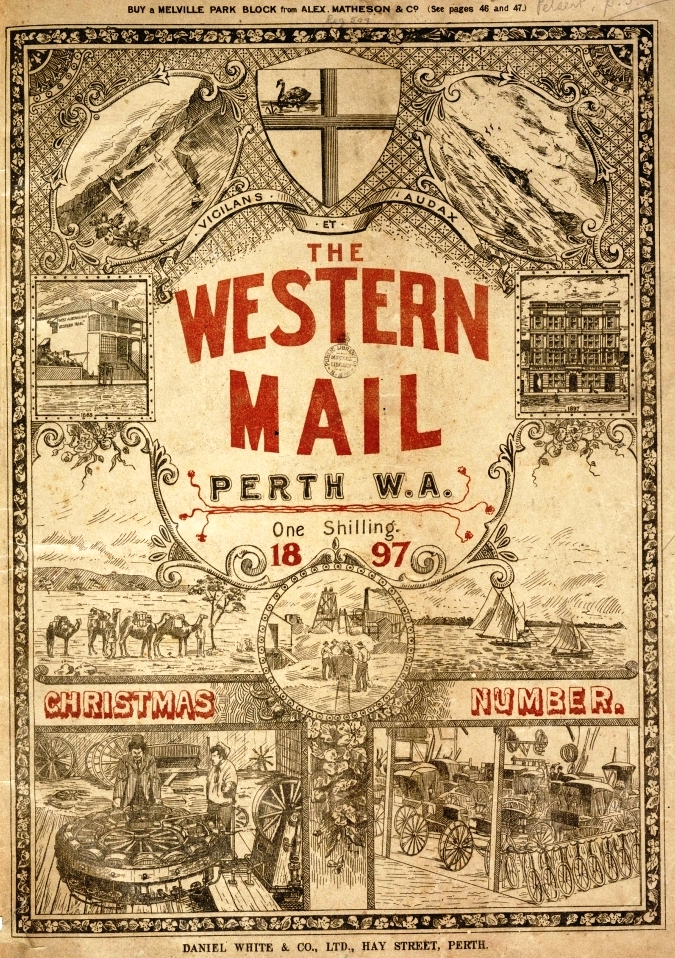
The 1897 Christmas Number

The first Western Mail was published on 19 December 1885 by Charles Harper and John Winthrop Hackett, co-owners of The West Australian, the state's major daily paper. It was printed by James Gibney at the paper's office in St Georges Terrace.

In 1901, in the publication Twentieth century impressions of Western Australia, a history of the early days of the West Australian and the Western Mail was published.

In the 1920s The West Australian employed its first permanent photographer Fred Flood, many of whose photographs were featured in the Western Mail.

In 1933 it celebrated its first use of photographs in 1897 in a West Australian article.

The Western Mail featured early work from many prominent West Australian authors and artists, including Mary Durack, Elizabeth Durack, May Gibbs, Stan Cross and Amy Heap. The Western Mail Annual editions (1897–1955) carried significant collections of Western Australia art, photography and writing from lesser-known artists such as Amelia Bunbury.

The Western Mail was primarily created to provide farmers with up to date information. However, for many women in the most isolated areas of the state it represented their only social connections beyond their families. The women's and children's sections became popular and often attracted the most revenue for the paper.

West Australian Newspapers management experimented with a variety of formats in the late 1940s and early 1950s, including the Weekend Mail for five years.

The newspaper was renamed to The Countryman on 27 January 1955.

However, the name Western Mail was recycled for a last Christmas Annual in 1956.

== Published 1980–1988 ==
In 1980 the name was resurrected for a new weekly, published by Western Mail Limited. The push for a new paper was made by Robert Holmes à Court and Bell Group following his failed takeover attempt of The Times (UK).

The venture was wound up in 1988.

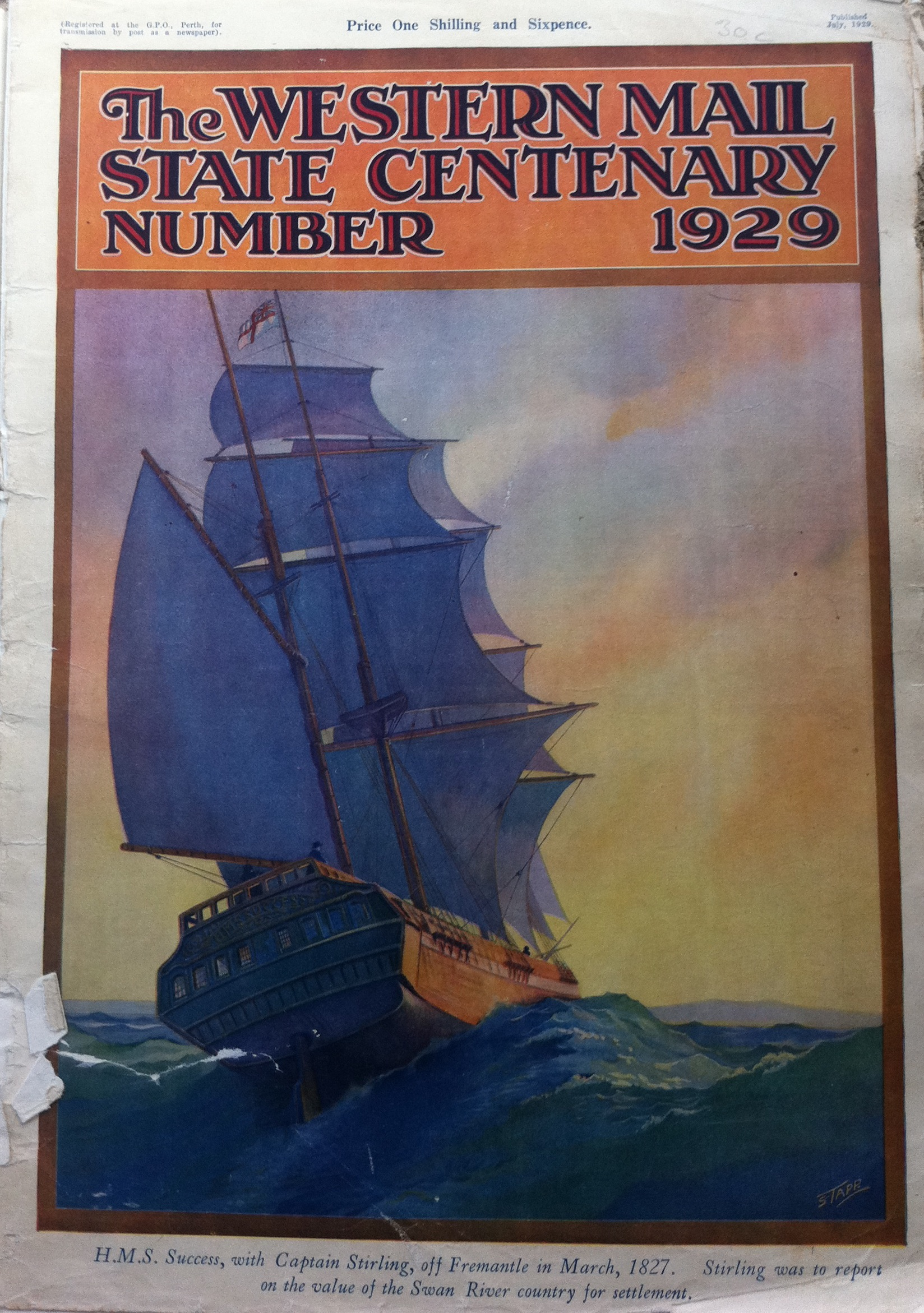
1929 centenary of Western Australia cover

== Publication details ==
=== 1885–1955 (WA Newspapers) ===
The Western Mail. Perth, W.A: West Australian Newspapers

- Vol. 1, no. 1 (19 December 1885) – Vol. 70, no. 3403 (20 January 1955)

Days of issues

- Weekly on Thursday 3 July 1919 – 20 January 1955
- Weekly on Friday 27 September 1912 – 27 June 1919
- Weekly on Saturday 16 September 1899 – 21 September 1912
- Weekly on Friday 21 June 1895 – 8 September 1899
- Weekly on Saturday 19 December. 1885 – 15 June 1895

Special issues and supplements

- Annual Christmas edition – 1897–1956
- State Centenary Number of the Western Mail, 4 July 1929 (including a colour reproduction of the painting 'The Founding of Perth' by G. Pitt Morison, and a historical calendar of the state)
- Centenary of the West Australian 1933
- Countryman's Magazine (Vol. 1, no. 1 (18 August 1949) – Vol. 2, No. 8 (9 April 1951)
- Women's Magazine (21 March 1946 – 23 October 1947)

Weekend Mail. Perth [W.A.]
West Australian Newspapers Ltd

- Known as Weekend Mail – TV from 5 September 1959 to 1960
- Vol. 1, No. 1 (22 January 1955) - Vol. 6, No. 290 (30 July 1960)
- Weekly on Saturday.
- Annual supplement: Weekend Mail Annual (1955–1960)

=== 1980–1988 (Western Mail Ltd) ===
The Western Mail, Perth, W.A : Western Mail Ltd., 1980–1988.

- Vol. 1, No. 1 (8 November 1980) – No. 374 (31 December – 3 January 1988).
- Weekly on Saturday.

== Editors ==
1944: Malcolm Uren

== Note on sources ==
Most dates are derived from the entries in the State Library's reference catalogue:

- Western Mail 1980
- Western Mail 1885
