= Meraki TV =

Australian lifestyle TV show

Meraki TV is an Australian lifestyle TV show that broadcasts nationally on Foxtel Australia. The show covers all things Greek Australian including current affairs, history, mini documentaries, philosophy, entertainment, art, travel, and culinary interests.

== Presenters ==
- Ana Sevo is a performer and creator within the Australian and Greek industries and the main host and executive producer of the show.
- Demitra Sealy, an Australian actress. She covers entertainment news, celebrity interviews and hosting the 'What's on' section of the show. In 2020, for the shows 6th season Demitra Sealy took over as the shows main host.
- DJ Krazy Kon. He covers music news and celebrity interviews.
- Billy Cotsis, film director, writer, and correspondent for Neos Kosmos.
- George Diakomichalis, patisserie chef and the show'ss official chief, hosting his own Greek cooking segment.
- Noula Diamantopoulos, a visual artist covering the shows art corner.

== Awards ==
In 2016 Meraki TV won its first award, winning a NSW Premier's Multicultural Media Award. Later that year, Ana Sevo's work won her and the show a Multicultural and Indigenous Media Award. In 2018, Meraki TV was nominated for a Premier's Multicultural Communications Award for 'Best TV Report'. In 2019, Meraki TV was nominated for an Antenna Award for 'Best Culturally and Linguistically Diverse Program.
