= Young Australian Journalist of the Year =

Companion award to the Walkley Awards

Established in 2008 by the Walkley Foundation for Journalism, the Young Australian Journalist of the Year award complements the prestigious Walkley Awards (Australia’s equivalent of the Pulitzer Prize). It recognizes exceptional work across five categories by journalists aged 26 and under:

- Print
- Television
- Radio
- Online
- Photography

Category winners compete for the overall Young Australian Journalist of the Year title, selected by the Walkley Board.

== Key Updates (2018–2024) ==
1. New Category (2021): Added Student Journalist of the Year for university-level talent.
2. Age Limit Flexibility: Extended to 30 during 2020–2022 due to COVID-19 career disruptions.
3. Diversity Emphasis: Recent juries prioritize First Nations, regional, and climate reporting.
4. Digital Expansion: Online category now includes podcasting and interactive storytelling.

== 2008 ==
The awards were announced on 24 July 2008:

- Inaugural: Sophie McNeill of SBS-TV
- Print: Ben Doherty, The Age
- Television: Sophie McNeill
- Radio: Michael Atkin, Triple J's "Hack"
- Online: Asher Moses, a reporter on the Sydney Morning Herald's website, for his story about politicians editing Wikipedia
- Photography: Andrew Quilty, The Australian Financial Review

== 2009 ==
The awards were announced on 25 June 2009:

- Young Australian Journalist of the Year overall winner: Julia Medew, The Age
- Print: Julia Medew, The Age
- Television: Yaara Bou Melhem, SBS-TV
- Radio: Michael Atkin, Triple J "Hack"
- Online: Nic MacBean, ABC Online
- Photography: Sandie Bertrand, The West Australian
