= Tom Tilley (television presenter) =

Australian communicator (born 1981)

- Born: 1981 (age 44–45); Victoria, Australia
- Education: Bachelor of Commerce, Macquarie University
- Occupations: Speechwriter, television and radio presenter, journalist
- Years active: 2007–present
- Employer: NSW Transport Minister John Graham
- Political party: Labor Party

Tom Tilley (born 1981) is an Australian political speechwriter and former television, radio presenter and journalist. He was previously the host of daily radio news program Hack on Triple J between 2011 and 2019. Since 2024 he has been the speechwriter and communications advisor for New South Wales Transport Minister John Graham.

== Career ==
Interested in journalism from a young age, Tilley undertook work experience at a radio station and for a newspaper during high school, but was initially discouraged by relatives from pursuing it as a career due to the difficulties in finding work within the industry. He worked as an investment banker at Deutsche Bank for two years after graduating from Macquarie University before choosing to change career paths. After travelling overseas and teaching himself video editing skills, Tilley decided that journalism was what he ultimately wanted to break into.

Tilley began working at the ABC in late 2005, undertaking secretarial work in its newsroom as a casual employee. He later moved into radio presenting, first during the late-night 'graveyard shift', and later as a talk-back presenter. In 2007, Tilley succeeded in landing a role as a reporter for daily Triple J news and current affairs radio program Hack, initially answering phone calls from listeners and working as an off location reporter from the Northern Territory. In 2011, he became host of the program, a role which he held until 2019. In 2014, Tilley hosted the first of a number of live studio-based debate and discussion forums broadcast on TV station ABC2. As of July 2017, Tilley has hosted nine of these specials, including five under the Hack Live brand.

Tilley announced in November 2019 that would be stepping down from hosting Hack at the end of the year. He would begin a new role as a contributor and part time host for Network 10's The Project, a program he had previously appeared on as a guest presenter throughout 2019. Prior to leaving the ABC, Tilley also filled-in as host of ABC radio program PM and was the reporter in an episode of current affairs program Foreign Correspondent.

Tilley has also been a fill in presenter on the Nine Network's Today Extra.

== Personal life ==
Tilley grew up in Mudgee, NSW with his parents and three brothers. He attended Mudgee High School where he became school captain.

Tilley’s father was the Pastor of the Mudgee congregation of Revival Centres International, a fundamentalist Pentecostal church established in Melbourne in the 1950s. Tilley effectively left the church when he moved to Sydney to study, formally doing so at age 21.

Following high school, he moved to Newport, Sydney to complete a Bachelor of Commerce at Macquarie University. He now resides in Tamarama.

Tilley is a bassist for Client Liaison during their live performances, and also has experience as a DJ. In 2016, he was a finalist in the Cleo Bachelor of the Year award.

== Awards and nominations ==
=== National Live Music Awards ===
The National Live Music Awards (NLMAs) are a broad recognition of Australia's diverse live industry, celebrating the success of the Australian live scene. The awards commenced in 2016.

Year	Nominee / work	Award	Result
National Live Music Awards of 2016	Tom Tilley (Client Liaison)	Live Bassist of the Year	Nominated
National Live Music Awards of 2017	Tom Tilley (Client Liaison)	Live Bassist of the Year	Nominated
