= Triple J Hack =

Australian current affairs program on Triple J

Hack
- Running time: 30 minutes (5:30 pm – 6:00 pm)
- Country of origin: Australia
- Home station: Triple J
- Hosted by: Dave Marchese
- Original release: 2004
- Website: https://www.abc.net.au/triplej/programs/hack

Hack is the flagship current affairs program on Australian youth radio station Triple J. It is hosted by Dave Marchese at drive time every weekday from 5:30 pm to 6:00 pm. Hack aims to deliver relevant news to their 18–24 year-old demographic, and includes interviews, talkback and reporting from regional Australia. Hack has its own dedicated news team, but also uses the resources of parent division ABC News. The show is also released as a podcast.

== History ==
Hack began at the start of 2004 after a shake-up of programming on Triple J. The previous current affairs program, The Morning Show, from 9:00 am to midday, was axed; the half-hour Hack was its replacement, from 5:30 pm to 6:00 pm.

It was hosted by Steve Cannane until mid-2006. One of Cannane's stories on Hack, "Petrol Sniffing, Pill Testing and the Cost of War", earned him a Walkley Award. He won the Walkley Award for Broadcast Interviewing in 2006.

At this point, Cannane left Triple J radio to become the current affairs reporter for Triple J TV. From 2008, the ABC launched The Hack Half Hour, a further development of the youth news programming on ABC 2. It was filmed at ABC Studios in Ultimo, and aired Mondays at 8:30 pm.

Kate O'Toole was Cannane's replacement as host of the radio program. O'Toole remained with the program until December 2010, until she was replaced by Tom Tilley.

In April 2012, journalist Sophie McNeill was announced as host of the program with Tom Tilley becoming the face of Hack on ABC News 24, although he continued to be a reporter for the show. Sophie went on maternity leave in 2013, and Tilley returned to the host role permanently when she decided not to return.

In December 2019, Tilley announced that he would be leaving Triple J to pursue other career opportunities, with Avani Dias being announced as Tilley's replacement. Jo Lauder, Isabella Higgins and Dave Marchese hosted the program for a short time in 2020 while Dias worked on a Four Corners investigation, with Dias returning to the chair shortly after. Dias continued to serve as presenter until December 2021 when she left to become the ABC News foreign correspondent to South East Asia. Dave Marchese was announced as Hack's new host for 2022.

The current executive producer (EP) is Stephen Smiley. Recent EPs have included Clare Blumer, Meghan Woods and prior to her, Laura McAuliffe who served as EP from 2018 to 2020.

== Hosts ==
- Steve Cannane (2004–2006)
- Kate O'Toole (2006–2010)
- Tom Tilley (2011–2012, 2013–2019)
- Sophie McNeill (2012–2013)
- Avani Dias (2020–2021)
- Dave Marchese (2022–present)
