= The West Australian =

Daily newspaper in Perth, Western Australia

- Front page of The West Australian; 6 November 2025
- Type: Daily newspaper (Mon. – Sat.)
- Format: Tabloid
- Owner: Seven Media Group
- Editor-in-chief: Christopher Dore
- Editor: Sarah-Jane Tasker
- Founded: 5 January 1833
- Political alignment: Centre-right
- Headquarters: 50 Hasler Road, Osborne Park, Western Australia
- Circulation: 340,000 (as of 2024)
- ISSN: 0312-6323
- Website: thewest.com.au

The West Australian is the only locally edited daily newspaper published in Perth, Western Australia. It is owned by Seven Media Group, as is the state's other major newspaper, The Sunday Times. It is the second-oldest continuously produced newspaper in Australia, having been published since 1833. It tends to have conservative leanings, and has mostly supported the Liberal–National Party Coalition. It has Australia's largest share of market penetration (84% of WA) of any newspaper in the country.

== Content ==
The West Australian publishes international, national and local news. As of 23 February 2015, newsgathering was integrated with the TV news and current-affairs operations of Seven News, Perth, which moved its news staff to the paper's Osborne Park premises. SWM also publishes two websites from Osborne Park—thewest.com.au and PerthNow. The daily newspaper includes lift-outs including Play Magazine, The Guide, West Weekend, and Body and Soul. Thewest.com.au is the online version of the daily newspaper, available only to subscribers.

=== Political leanings ===
The West Australian leans right wing politically. An editorial published on 25 April 2022 claimed that the newspaper was "economically conservative, but socially progressive". For every federal election from 1922 to 1969, the newspaper endorsed the conservative Coalition. At the state election held in March 2017, the newspaper's editorial endorsed the Australian Labor Party opposition, led by Mark McGowan, over the Liberal–National government led by Colin Barnett. The West Australian endorsed the Coalition at the 2019 Australian federal election, Labor in the 2021 state election, and the Coalition at the 2022 Australian federal election. During the COVID-19 pandemic, The West Australian supported the McGowan Labor Government up until 20 January 2022, when the decision was made to delay the reopening of interstate borders, locking Seven West Media Chairman Kerry Stokes, who was on an overseas trip, out of the state. Following this, the newspaper has been highly critical of McGowan's COVID-19 response.

=== Endorsements ===
Election	Endorsement	Ref.
2010 federal	Coalition	
2013 state	Liberal	
2013 federal	Coalition	
2016 federal	Coalition	
2017 state	Labor	
2019 federal	Coalition	
2021 state	Labor	
2022 federal	Coalition	
2025 state	No endorsement	
2025 federal	Coalition	

== Presentation ==
Formerly a conservative "daily paper of record", The West has adopted the style of a popular tabloid. It has very ably utilised colour printing and its monopolist status to maximise display advertising including the use of multi-page advertorial supplements and loose inserts. Advertising is frequently accorded priority over news on the front page by means of a four-page wrap-around cover section.

== Audience ==
As of January 2015, refraining from reporting greatly reduced print circulation, the paper claimed "readership across print and online platforms" of 1.8 million per month (a daily average of less than 70,000). The West Australian recorded a significant fall of nearly 25% in profit in June 2016. A serious drop in circulation was also reported, with average weekday circulation down from 157,000 to 145,000, while the weekend edition averaged 241,000, down from 258,000. Cost-saving measures, such as staff redundancies, were attributed to the poor performance.

In 2021, audited "cross-platform readership" of The West and The Sunday Times combined was 4.1 million per month. In February 2022, Seven West Media WA chief executive Maryna Fewster announced growth to 4.5 million per month boosted by (potentially duplicated) counts of hits on subsidiary websites including PerthNow, the video program Up Late, morning radio show The West Live, and sundry video packages launched on thewest.com.au.

== Ownership ==
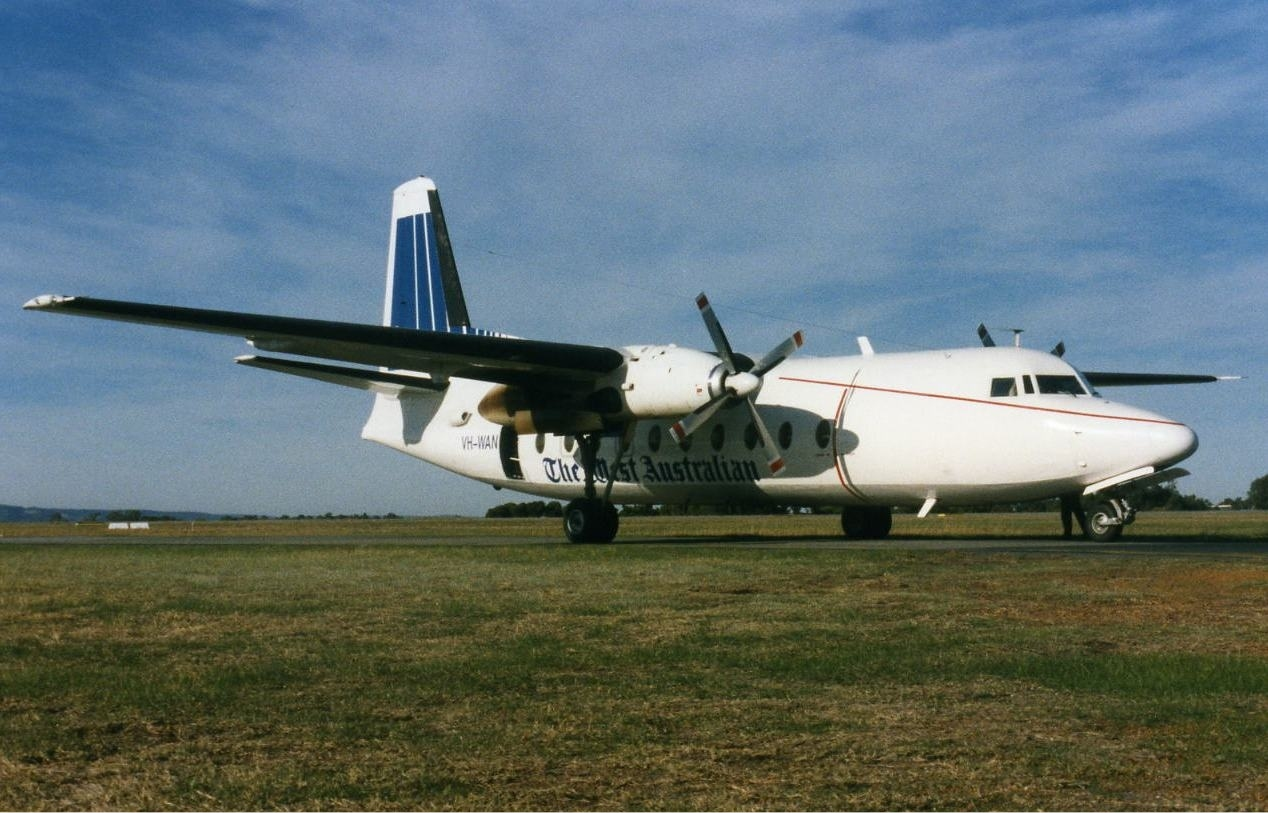
The West Australian used this Fokker 27 in the mid-1990s to deliver its newspapers on a nightly flight to the north of Western Australia.

The West Australian was owned by the publicly listed company West Australian Newspapers from the 1920s. In 1969, the Melbourne based Herald & Weekly Times bought WAN and published the paper until 1987 when it was sold to Robert Holmes à Court's Bell Group, when the remainder of H&WT was bought by Rupert Murdoch's News Corporation. The following year Alan Bond, through Bond Corporation, gained control of Bell Group and hence the paper. This ownership structure only survived for a few years until the collapse of Bond Corporation. A newly formed company, West Australian Newspapers Holdings, then purchased the paper from the receivers before being floated in an oversubscribed $185 million public offering. The company was listed on the Australian Securities Exchange on 9 January 1992. A management fee of $217,000 and underwriting/brokers handling fee of $1.9 million were paid to companies associated with former short-term directors John Poynton and J. H. Nickson. After acquiring the Seven Media Group in April 2011, West Australian Newspapers Holdings became Seven West Media, Australia's largest diversified media business.

== History ==
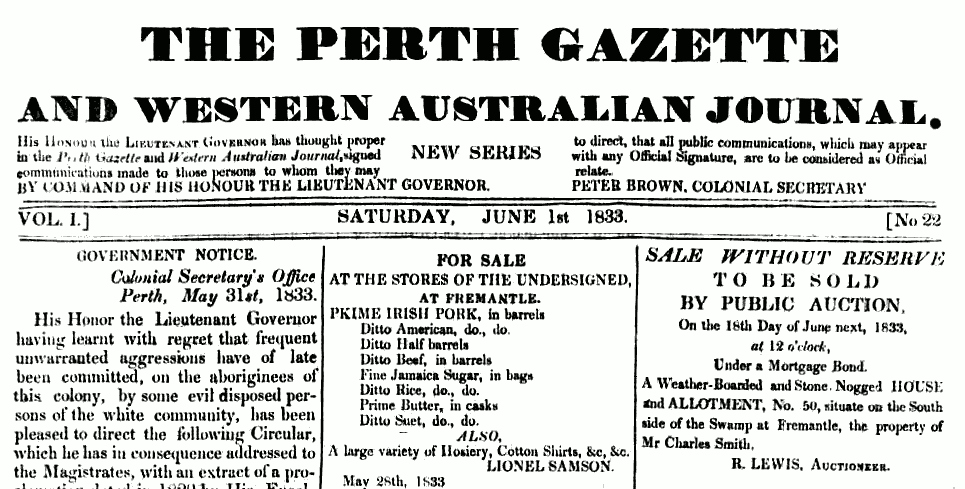
Masthead from the Perth Gazette and Western Australian Journal, Saturday 1 June 1833

The West Australian traces its origins to The Perth Gazette and Western Australian Journal, the first edition of which appeared on 5 January 1833. Owned and edited by Perth postmaster Charles Macfaull, it was originally a four-page weekly. It was, at first, published on Saturdays, but changed to Fridays in 1864. From 7 October 1864 it was known as The Perth Gazette and Western Australian Times and was published by Arthur Shenton, until 24 March 1871, after which the publisher was Joseph Mitchell, until 29 September 1871. The new publisher, M. Shenton, remained in place until 26 June 1874. when it was bought by a syndicate who renamed it The Western Australian Times and who in September 1874 increased production to two editions a week. On 18 November 1879, it was relaunched as The West Australian. In October 1883, production was increased to three editions per week; two years later it became a daily publication. The proprietors of the West Australian at that time also inaugurated the Western Mail, in 1885. Initially, delivery of the paper beyond settled areas was problematic, but the growth and development of the rural railway system in the early 1900s facilitated wider circulation.

In September 2015 the Australian Competition & Consumer Commission approved the acquisition of The Sunday Times, which would give Seven West Media a monopoly over major newspapers in the state. Finalisation of the deal, which includes the website PerthNow, was announced by The West Australian on 8 November 2016. In May 2019, SWM acquired Community Newspaper Group, adding 13 titles to the newspaper suite in WA, and have since moved all of the community websites onto the PerthNow website. In June 2019, The West Australian began putting some of its website content behind a subscription paywall.

=== Locations ===
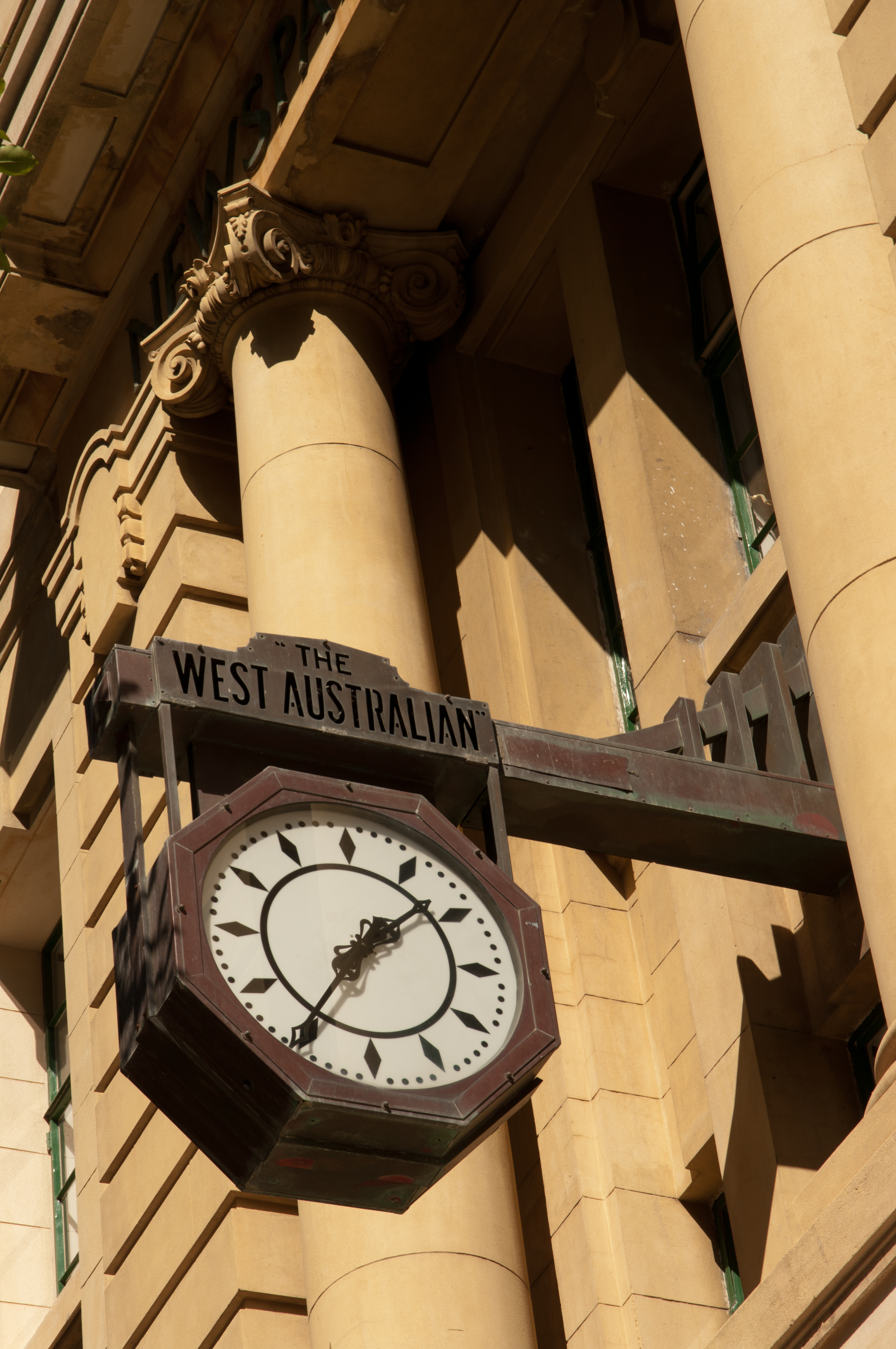
Clock on the former premises, Newspaper House, St Georges Terrace

In 1933, The West Australian moved to the purpose-built Newspaper House on St Georges Terrace in Perth. It included an office and publishing plant, and was a prominent landmark in the life of the city and state for more than 50 years. Newspaper House was vacated in the mid-1980s for the ill-fated "Westralia Square" redevelopment which was completed in 2012 under the name Brookfield Place. The editorial staff was temporarily relocated in a nearby office building. Recognised as part of an important heritage precinct, Newspaper House was scheduled for preservation and refurbishment. In 1988, larger and more modern accommodation for the paper's printing presses was commissioned in Osborne Park. In 1998, the editorial operations also moved to the Osborne Park complex.

=== Publications ===
In the 1940s and later, the newspaper published more than twenty editions of Charles Gardner's West Australian wildflowers. At various stages in its history, the newspaper had a periodicals division that has published calendars, gardening books, and collections of historical photographs.

In 1954, to celebrate the visit of Queen Elizabeth II, a souvenir program was produced.

The front page of the edition that was published bilingually

On 27 May 2022, as part the National Reconciliation Week, the paper under the title of Marawar Boodjara, published a special wraparound where the front cover was written bilingually in the local Indigenous language of the area, Noongar and English. This was helped by the newspaper's resident Noongar linguist, Alison Nannup. This received praised from many quarters including the prime minister. This was repeated the next year, on 28 May 2023.

=== Photographic archives ===
In the 1990s, a series of pictorial books from the photographic archives were produced:

- The Fifties
- The Sixties
- A Small War
- The Migrant Album
- No Survivors
- Stage, Screen & Stars
- Decades of Royalty
- Four-wheeled pioneers

== Editors ==
- 1833–1846 Charles Macfaull
- 1847–1871 Arthur Shenton
- 1871–1874 Mercy Shenton
- 1874–1879 Rev. C. G. Nicolay and John Rowland Jones; Henry Hullock
- 1879–1887 Sir Thomas Cockburn-Campbell
- 1887–1916 John Winthrop Hackett
- 1916–1927 Alfred Langler
- 1927–1951 Charles Patrick Smith
- 1951–1956 James Edward "Jim" Macartney
- 1956–1972 W. T. G. (William Thomas Griffith) "Griff" Richards
- 1972–1972 F. B. (Fred) Morony
- 1972–1983 M. C. (Bon) Uren
- 1983–1987 D. B. (Don) Smith
- 1987–1988 R. E. (Bob) Cronin
- 1988–1990 Don Baker
- 1990–2000 Paul Murray
- 2000–2003 Brian Rogers
- 2003–2008 Paul Armstrong
- 2008–2009 R. E. (Bob) Cronin
- 2009–2018 Brett McCarthy
- 2018–2024 Anthony De Ceglie
- 2024–present Christopher Dore (editor-in-chief) Sarah-Jane Tasker (editor)

== Controversies ==
The first book published in Western Australia, Report of the Late Trial for Libel!!! Clarke versus MacFaul (Fremantle, 1835), by the future editor of the Swan River Guardian William Nairne Clark, concerned a libel case brought against the editor of the Perth Gazette, Charles Macfaull, by the accusations of incompetence and impugned character printed in regard to a Captain Clark. A letter of apology was refused and the court awarded damages of £27 to the captain of the vessel. Macfaull maintained his reputation although his resources were significantly reduced by the verdict.

In February 2005 former Australian Labor prime minister Bob Hawke labelled the paper "a disgrace to reasonable objective journalism". Academic Peter van Onselen substantiated this attack, identifying 10 pro-Opposition front-page headlines in the lead-up to the 2005 state election, but no pro-Government headlines.

In May 2007, then attorney-general and health minister in the State Labor government, Jim McGinty, described the newspaper as "the nation's most inaccurate and dishonest newspaper". He went on to attack the editor, Paul Armstrong, saying that "the board of West Australian Newspapers needs to sack the editor. It is personally driven by a particular individual". Armstrong responded by saying he "could not give a fat rat's arse" about Mr McGinty's comments and was then virulently attacked by premier Alan Carpenter, whose government the paper continued to denigrate until its defeat at the 2008 election.

On 8 December 2014 the management of West Australian Newspapers announced that printed editions of The West Australian would no longer be available in retail outlets located north of Broome in the Kimberley region of Western Australia, including towns such as Derby, Halls Creek, Fitzroy Crossing, Wyndham and Kununurra, due to the expense of transporting and delivering printed newspapers.

== Notable contributors ==
- Piers Akerman
- Dean Alston
- Estelle Blackburn
- Brian Burke
- Robert Drewe
- Dame Mary Durack (Used the nom-de-plume "Virgilia")
- Frederick Flood
- Sir Paul Hasluck
- Adele Horin
- Peter Kennedy
- Catherine Ellen Martin, Gold Walkley Award Winner, 1978
- Paul Murray
- Paul Rigby
- David Williams
- Andre Malan

== See also ==
- List of newspapers in Western Australia
- List of newspapers in Australia
- List of magazines in Australia
