= Roz Hammond =

Australian actress

- Born: Rosalind Hammond
- Occupations: Actress, writer
- Years active: 1993–present
- Website: www.rozhammond.com

Rosalind Hammond, often credited as Ros or Roz, is an Australian actress and writer who has worked in theatre, film, and television. Hammond's television appearances include the role of Heather in ABC's Bay of Fires, Claudia in The Heights, and ten seasons of Shaun Micallef's Mad as Hell.

== Early life and education ==
Rosalind Hammond is a graduate of the Western Australian Academy of Performing Arts.

== Career ==
Hammond played the role of librarian Christine Grimwood in three series of the ABC sitcom The Librarians. She was a regular cast member on Thank God You're Here, Full Frontal, Sky Trackers, Snowy, and Micro Nation.

Hammond made guest appearances on the television series Harrow, Please Like Me, The Letdown, Carla Cametti PD, Driven Crazy, Law of the Land, MDA, Miss Fisher's Murder Mysteries, Mr & Mrs Murder, Newstopia, Offspring, Outland, Raw FM, Slide and Welcher and Welcher, and in the TV movie Curtin.

She also wrote for television programs, including ABC Kids series Little Lunch, ABC's It's A Date, SkitHOUSE, Eric Bana's sketch show Eric, Home and Away, The Mick Molloy Show and Small Tales and True.

She has appeared in feature films Muriel's Wedding, in which she played one of the bridesmaids; The Dish, The Honourable Wally Norman; and the short film Titsiana Booberini.

Hammond's theatre credits include productions with the Melbourne and Sydney Theatre Companies with roles in Blithe Spirit, The Female of the Species, Happy Endings (2012), Kid Stakes, Secret Bridesmaids' Business, and Things We Do For Love.

Her one-woman show, Full Blown Rose, had successful international tours to the Dublin Fringe Festival and the Glasgow Millers International Comedy Festival. At the 2005 Melbourne International Comedy Festival, she received a Golden Gibbo nomination.

From 2012 to 2022, Hammond appeared as a regular guest for Shaun Micallef's Mad as Hell, on which she portrayed characters such as Jacquie Lambie’s press secretary Dolly Norman, conservative blogger Vomitoria Catchment, royal watcher Gay March. She previously worked with Shaun Micallef in three series of The Micallef Programme.

At the 2013 Melbourne International Comedy Festival, she performed Gym and Tonic, based on her "other career" as a personal trainer at an all-women's gym. The production then toured nationally.

In 2023, Hammond appeared in ABC series Bay of Fires. In 2024 she appeared in ABC comedy series White Fever. In 2025 she appeared in ABC crime-comedy-drama series Return to Paradise.

== Filmography ==
=== Film ===
Year	Title	Role	Notes
2022	Blueback	Celebrant	Feature film
2022	How to Please a Woman	Claudia	Feature film
2019	By Your Side	Leonie	Short film
2015	Blythe Spirit	Madam Arcati	
2015	Hammer or Claw	Emma	Short film
2010	Bufo	Susan Hurley	Short film
2008	Corrections	Receptionist	Short film
2007	The King	Kathleen	TV movie
2007	Curtin	Gladys Joyce	TV movie
2006	Love No.9	Ivy	Short film
2006	The Demons Among Us	Kylie's mother	
2004	Josh Jarman	Burgerland Girl	Feature film
2003	The Honourable Wally Norman	Dolly Norman	Feature film
2000	The Dish	Miss Nolan	Feature film
1997	Titsiana Booberini	Carol Johnson	Short film
1996	Eric	Various	TV movie
1994	Muriel's Wedding	Cheryl	Feature film

=== Television ===
Year	Title	Role	Notes	Ref
2025	Return to Paradise	Jonshi Shiva	TV series; 1 episode	
2024	White Fever	Deidre Thomas	TV series; 5 episodes	
2023-	Bay of Fires	Heather	TV series	
2023	Cool Mum		TV series, 3 episodes	
2022	Irreverent	Margie	TV series, 10 episodes	
2022	Summer Love	Janelle (voice)	TV series, 1 episode	
2012-22	Shaun Micallef's Mad as Hell	Various	TV series, 114 episodes	
2019-22	Five Bedrooms	Edwina Crowe	TV series, 6 episodes	
2021	Iggy and Ace	Gwen	TV series, 6 episodes	
2021	Harrow	Karen Yancy	TV series, 1 episode	
2021	Why Are You Like This	Julie	TV series, 2 episodes	
2019-20	The Heights	Claudia Rosso	TV series, 60 episodes	
2019	Secret Bridesmaids' Business	Ginger Connor	TV miniseries, 2 episodes	
2018	Pilot Week	Barista	TV series, 1 episode	
2017	Childproof	Various (voice)	TV series, 6 episodes	
2017	The Letdown	Christine	TV series, 1 episode	
2016	Jack Irish	Sue Shields	TV series, 6 episodes	
2015	Kinne	Various	TV series, 6 episodes	
2014	It's a Date	Lizzie	TV series, 1 episode	
2014	Please Like Me	Marilyn	TV series, 2 episodes	
2013	Upper Middle Bogan	Sandi	TV series, 1 episode	
2013	Offspring	Maryjeanne	TV series, 1 episode	
2013	Mr & Mrs Murder	Deborah Newhouse	TV series, 1 episode	
2012	Micro Nation	Betty Cosdosca	TV web series, 1 episode	
2012	Miss Fisher's Murder Mysteries	Mrs Opie	TV series, 1 episode	
2012	Outland	Simone	TV miniseries, 1 episode	
2011	Mollusks	Vanessa 'Big Mama Jelly'	TV series. 3 episodes	
2011	Some Say Love	Various	TV series, 1 episode	
2011	Mal.com	Janelle	TV series, 1 episode	
2011	SLiDE	Rosie	TV series, 3 episodes	
2007-10	The Librarians	Christine Grinwood	TV series, 20 episodes	
2009	Carla Cametti PD	Sandra DeLuca	TV miniseries, 1 episode	
2007	Newstopia	Lindy Spern	TV series, 1 episode	
2005	MDA	Courtney Gould	TV series, 2 episode	
2004	Stories from the Golf	Woman	TV series, 1 episode	
2003	Welcher & Welcher	Thadia	TV series, 2 episodes	
2003	Skithouse	Various	TV series	
2002	Bootleg	Tricia Moore	TV series. 3 episodes	
1996-02	Blue Heelers	Kerryn / Siobhan	TV series, 3 episodes	
1998-01	The Micallef P(r)ogram(me)	Various	TV series, 23 episodes	
2000	Introducing Gary Petty	Colleen Turner	TV series, 1 episode	
1999	The Mick Molloy Show	Various	TV series, 3 episodes	
1999	Law of the Land	Ann	TV series, 1 episode	
1998	Small Tales & True	Various	TV series, 6 episodes	
1998	Driven Crazy	Dr Brandt	TV series, 1 episode	
1998	Raw FM	Flavia	TV series, 1 episode	
1997	Eric	Various	TV series, 9 episodes	
1996	Full Frontal	Additional Cast	TV series, 1 episode	
1994	Sky Trackers	Ellie	TV series, 26 episodes	
1994	Newlyweds	Sarah	TV series, 1 episode	
1993	Snowy	Jill	TV series, 7 episodes	

== Stage ==
=== As actor ===
Year	Title	Role	Notes
1996	Kid Stakes	Marcy Wells	Playhouse Melbourne with Melbourne Theatre Company
2000	Secret Bridesmaids' Business	Angela Dixon	Malthouse Theatre, Playhouse, Adelaide
2001	Dear Sun	Joy Hester	Melbourne Theatre Company
2004	Blithe Spirit	Ruth	Melbourne Theatre Company & Sydney Theatre Company
2005	Country Energy Comedy Festival	Comedian	The Butter Factory Theatre, Wodonga
2005	Things We Do For Love	Nikki Wickstead	Arts Centre Melbourne with Melbourne Theatre Company
2005	Garden Ho		Melbourne International Comedy Festival & Dublin Festival
2006	The Female of the Species	Tess Thornton	Melbourne Theatre Company
2006	Full Blown Rose	Herself	Dublin Fringe Festival, Glasgow Millers International Comedy Festival
2009	Master of the Revels		Southbank Theatre with Melbourne Theatre Company
2010	Cubec Reading- You Won't Be Seeing Rainbows Anymore - 5		Melbourne Theatre Company
2010	Furiously Fertile	Jen	Hit Productions
2012	Happy Endings	Liliana	Southbank Theatre with Melbourne Theatre Company
2012	Red Silk	Anne Sexton	Red Silk Productions
2013	Gym and Tonic	Herself	Melbourne Town Hall for Melbourne International Comedy Festival & national tour
2013	Day One, A Hotel, Evening	Stella	Heath Ledger Theatre, Perth with Black Swan Theatre Company
2015	Blithe Spirit		Heath Ledger Theatre, Perth with Black Swan Theatre Company
2016–17	Signifying Nothing	Karen Fox	The Blue Room Theatre, Perth, The Studio, Adelaide with Hammond Fleet Productions

=== As director ===
Year	Title	Role	Notes
2016	These Things Happen	Director	Hammond Fleet Productions
2016	This is Not a Love Song	Director	Hammond Fleet Productions

== General references ==
- "AusStage". ausstage.edu.au.
- "Roz Hammond – IMC".
- "Things We Do For Love". The Age.
- "The Female of the Species". Theatregold.
- "Kid Stakes". Theatregold.
