= Gary McCaffrie =

Australian TV writer and producer

Gary McCaffrie is an Australian television comedy writer and producer, best known for his work on Fast Forward and Full Frontal, and his many collaborations with comedian Shaun Micallef. Most recently he was the creator and co-writer (with Wayne Hope) of Very Small Business (2008), and writer of Ground Up (2026).

With Micallef, he created The Micallef Program, which ran for three award-winning seasons (1998–2001), and the BlackJack series of telemovies (2003–2007) starring Colin Friels. Gary has also contributed to Micallef's other TV projects, including Shaun Micallef's World Around Him (1996), Welcher & Welcher (2003), Micallef Tonight (2003) and Newstopia (2007-2008). Among his other writing credits are The Games, skitHOUSE, Comedy Inc. and BackBerner.

== Filmography ==
Year	Title	Credit	Role	Notes
2026	Ground Up	Writer		6 episodes
2013	Upper Middle Bogan	Writer		2 episodes
2012–2013	Shaun Micallef's Mad as Hell	Writer	Talkback Caller	Uncredited role; 22 episodes
2010–2011	A Quiet Word With ...	Director	Himself	4 episodes
2010–2012	Talkin' 'Bout Your Generation	Writer		40 episodes
2009	Shaun Micallef's New Year's Rave	Writer		
2009	TV Burp	Writer		7 episodes
2009	Double Take	Writer		11 episodes
2008	Very Small Business	Creator, Writer & Associate Producer		7 episodes
2007–2008	Newstopia	Writer		30 episodes
2007	The Librarians	Associate producer & Script Editor		7 episodes
2007	The Wedge	Writer		22 episodes
2005–2007	Comedy Inc.	Writer		58 episodes
2003	Bad Eggs	Video United Director		Feature film
2003	Micallef Tonight	Writer		13 episodes
2003	BlackJack	Writer & Associate Producer		TV movie
2003	Welcher & Welcher	Writer	Biscuit-Craving Lawyer	2 episodes
2003–2004	Skithouse	Writer		Various episodes
2002	Flipside	Writer		7 episodes
2001	43rd TV Week Logie Awards	Writer		
1999–2002	BackBerner	Writer & Segment Producer		Various episodes
1998–1999	Totally Full Frontal	Writer		15 episodes
1998–2001	The Micallef Program	Writer, producer & Script Editor	Various characters	23 episodes
1996	Shaun Micallef's World Around Him	Writer & producer		TV movie
1994	Jimeoin	Writer		15 episodes
1993–1997	Full Frontal	Writer & producer		114 episodes
1992	Bligh	Writer		The Slap of the Writ (#1.9)
1990–1992	Fast Forward	Writer		56 episodes
1990–1993	Tonight Live with Steve Vizard	Writer		Various episodes
