= Greenslade (surname) =

Greenslade is a surname. Notable people with the surname include:

- Arthur Greenslade (1923–2003), British conductor and composer
- Charles Greenslade (1843-1917), co-founder and maltster of Speight's brewery, Dunedin, New Zealand
- Dave Greenslade (1943-2026), English keyboardist
- Des Greenslade (1933-2021), Welsh rugby player
- Edwin Greenslade Murphy (1866-1939), Australian writer
- Ella Greenslade (born 1997), New Zealand rower
- Ellison Greenslade (born 1961), Bahamian police officer
- Francis Greenslade (born 1962), Australian actor
- Henry Greenslade (1867–1945), New Zealand politician
- John Greenslade (1880–1950), United States Navy admiral
- John Webber Greenslade (c. 1935), former Mayor of Grey, New Zealand
- Kathryn Greenslade (born 1998), British swimmer
- Malcolm Greenslade (born 1948), Australian rules footballer
- Roy Greenslade (born 1946), English journalism academic
- Sidney Greenslade (1867–1955), English architect
- Stanley Lawrence Greenslade (1905-1977), English theologian
- Tosh Greenslade, Australian actor (part of seven-member cast of Shaun Micallef's Mad as Hell along with Francis Greenslade, however the pair are unrelated)
- Wallace Greenslade (1912–1961), British radio announcer and newsreader
