= Newstopia =

2007–2008 Australian TV series

- Created by: Shaun Micallef
- Directed by: Kevin Carlin; Bradley J Howard
- Starring: Shaun Micallef; Kat Stewart; Ben Anderson; Nicholas Bell; Peter Houghton; Julie Eckersley
- Country of origin: Australia
- Original language: English
- No. of seasons: 3
- No. of episodes: 30

Production
- Running time: 30 minutes per episode (including commercials)
- Production company: Crackerjack Productions

Original release
- Network: SBS One
- Release: 10 October 2007 – 3 December 2008

Related
- Micallef Tonight (2003); The Micallef P(r)ogram(me) (1998); Welcher & Welcher (2003)

Newstopia (stylised as NEWStopiä) is an Australian half-hour satirical comedy programme hosted by Shaun Micallef. The first season premiered at 10:00 pm on SBS TV on 10 October 2007 and concluded on 3 December 2007. A second season began on 27 February 2008 and concluded on 30 April 2008. A third season of the show screened from 1 October to 3 December 2008. The show was developed by Micallef, Gary McCaffrie, Michael Ward and Jason Stephens, with McCaffrie and Ward working as writers on the programme. A fourth season in 2009 was planned, but cancelled due to production clashes with Talkin' 'Bout Your Generation.

The show's contributors include Matt Cameron, Doug MacLeod, Dave O'Neil, Tony Moclair and Richard Marsland.

== Format ==
The show was presented in the style of a news bulletin, with Shaun Micallef acting as anchor. It began with a statement by Micallef about history and/or news and its relation to the show. The rest of the program featured segments often detailing factual events, but told from a humorous or satirical angle. Like much of Micallef's earlier work, the humour depicted was mostly surreal, with some social satire.

The program included several fictional advertisements placed throughout the real commercial breaks, dressed up to appear as authentic commercials for SBS programs, for example, Inspektor Herring, a parody of Inspector Rex. Because the commercials were fictional creations of Newstopia, for the first two seasons, SBS broadcast them with the SBS watermark at the bottom right corner, whereas genuine commercials did not show the watermark. Starting in the third season, the show removed the SBS watermark during the fictional advertisements.

The show also featured subliminal parodies of Pope Benedict XVI in which his image was replaced with one of Nosferatu, long enough to be noticed, but not long enough for the viewer to have a clear idea of what they had just seen.

== Cast ==
=== Regular cast ===
- Shaun Micallef
- Ben Anderson
- Nicholas Bell
- Julie Eckersley
- Miyuki Watanabe
- Peter Houghton
- Kat Stewart
- Imat Akelo-Opio

=== Special guests ===
- Ed Kavalee
- Roz Hammond as Lindy Spern
- Les Murray
- Bob Franklin
- Daina Reid
- Lee Lin Chin
- Francis Greenslade
- Barry Jones
- Tony Martin
- Anton Enus
- Chris Taylor
- Andrew Hansen
- Kate Jenkinson as Amanda

== Internet streaming ==
Following the conclusion of each episode's initial broadcast, the Newstopia website featured a web stream of the current week's episode. This was only available for 7 days, and only to Australian residents, after which it was taken down and replaced by the latest broadcast. International visitors were blocked by an IP blocker. A guestbook was also available for commenting on the newest episode.

== See also ==
- CNNNN
- The Daily Show
- Rick Mercer Report
- This Hour Has 22 Minutes
- The Beaverton (TV series)
- Hot Seat
- Real Time with Bill Maher
