= Shaun Micallef's World Around Him =

1996 Australian comedy TV program

- Genre: Sketch comedy
- Written by: Shaun Micallef; Gary McCaffrie
- Directed by: Ted Emery
- Starring: Shaun Micallef; Bob Franklin; Kitty Flanagan; Kym Gyngell; Daina Reid; Francis Greenslade
- Country of origin: Australia

Production
- Running time: 50 mins

Original release
- Network: Seven Network
- Release: 1996

Related
- The Micallef Program

Shaun Micallef's World Around Him was an Australian sketch comedy television special. Its title is a parody of the Australian documentary series The World Around Us. Airing on the Seven Network in 1996, the special provided a major stepping stone for comedian Shaun Micallef. The show helped to develop much of the style and content of Micallef's successful sketch-comedy series The Micallef Program which began airing on the ABC in 1998.

== DVD ==
The show was released as a bonus extra on the 2011 DVD The Incompleat Shaun Micallef which featured highlights of Micallef's work on the comedy series Full Frontal 1995-1997.
