= Dave O'Neil =

Australian comedian, television and radio presenter

- Born: David O'Neil; 8 May 1965 (age 61); Melbourne, Victoria, Australia
- Education: RMIT University Melbourne University

Comedy career
- Medium: Television, film, radio

David O'Neil (born 8 May 1965) is an Australian stand-up comedian, actor, bass guitarist, writer, television and radio presenter.

== Early life ==
O'Neil was a Cub, Scout, Venturer and Rover. His late father Kevin was the Group Leader at the 1st/3rd Mitcham Scout Group.

After finishing high school at Mitcham High School in Melbournes East O'Neil completed a course in primary school teaching; however, he never taught. He became a field officer for the Red Cross, giving talks and training sessions, where he first enjoyed public speaking and the opportunity to tell jokes.

In the late 1980s, he was a member of Melbourne band Captain Cocoa, in which he played bass. His identical twin brother, Glenn, was the lead vocalist.

O’Neil is a supporter of the Geelong Football Club in the AFL .

== Career ==
=== Radio ===
O'Neil ventured into radio in the early 1990s, appearing on the Osso Booko Show on Melbourne community station 3RRR from 1992 to 1997. He co-hosted the one-hour sketch comedy show on Sundays with Vic Plume and Alan Parkes. He also spent some time on the RRR Breakfast team with Kate Langbroek and regular phone-ins from Dave Hughes.

In December 2001, he joined then-new radio station Nova 100 in Melbourne, on the top-rating Hughesy, Kate & Dave breakfast show. He later left in July 2006 for Nova's sister station, Vega 91.5 to co-host the breakfast show Dave and Denise with Shaun Micallef. In 2007, Ian "Dicko" Dickson and Chrissie Swan joined the show with Denise Scott with Shaun Micallef leaving the station.

In 2010, once Vega 91.5 became Classic Rock 91.5, Chrissie Swan departed the breakfast team. However, on 15 July 2010 Ian "Dicko" Dickson and O'Neil were axed from Classic Rock 91.5.

From 2017 until 2022, O'Neil was a regular guest and fill in for Sam Pang on Nova 100's breakfast show Chrissie, Sam & Browny.

In 2025, O'Neil is a regular fill-in host on ABC Radio Melbourne for Breakfast and ABC Nights as host. He also features in a weekly segment each with Brigitte Duclos on ABC Radio Melbourne Afternoon program every Wednesday, where they explore all things nostalgic.

=== Television ===
In 1997, O'Neil featured on the RMITV show Under Melbourne Tonights 1997 Christmas Special. He appeared on the RMITV show The Loft Live on 8 July 1999 and again on The Loft Live Comedy Benefit" episode on 10 February 2000. From 2005 to 2021, he also appeared as a regular guest on the Australian music TV show Spicks and Specks. In 2010, O'Neil also appeared on the first episode of ABC1 miniseries Sleuth 101, in which he was a guest detective, solving a murder mystery. From 2011 to 2013, he also appeared regularly on the ABC1 talk show Adam Hills In Gordon Street Tonight. In 2013, he appeared on the ABC's Tractor Monkeys.

O'Neil has also appeared on All Star Family Feud, Celebrity Name Game, The Project, Show Me the Movie!, Have You Been Paying Attention? Hughesy, We Have a Problem, Fisk and Claire Hoopers House of Games.

From 1998 to 1999, O'Neil was a head writer for the Network 10 sketch comedy show, Totally Full Frontal.

=== Politics ===
At the Australian federal election in 2007, O'Neil stood as an independent candidate for the federal seat of Gellibrand in Melbourne's industrial and portside inner western suburbs including Williamstown, Newport, Spotswood, Footscray, Braybrook, Altona and parts of Altona Meadows and Laverton. He received 2.3% of the vote.

=== Podcasts ===
In 2017, O'Neil began a new podcast The Debrief with Dave O'Neil. Each episode he drives a comedian home from a gig and discusses comedy and their career. It's available through iTunes and other podcast apps. Guests on the show have included Colin Lane, Denise Scott, Tom Ballard, Dilruk Jayasinha, Fiona O'Loughlin, Joel Creasey Dave Thornton, Pete Helliar Anthony Lehman, Des Dowling, Brad Oakes and Cal Wilson.

O'Neil's other podcasts include Somehow Related which he co-hosts with Glenn Robbins and The Junkees co-hosted with Kitty Flanagan.

== Filmography ==
=== Film ===
Year	Title	Role	Type
2002	The Nugget	Sue	Feature film
2002	Guru Wayne	End Devotee	Feature film
2003	Take Away	Mal the Butcher	Feature film
2005	You and Your Stupid Mate	Akela	Feature film
2009	Less Adolescent	Scout Leader	Feature film
2010	Ricky! The Movie	Self (cameo)	Mockumentary film
2016	Uber X-Citing Day	Self	Short film

=== Television ===
Year	Title	Role	Type
1994	Jimeoin	Various characters	TV series, 6 episodes
1997	Eric	Various characters	TV series, 9 episodes
1998	The Micallef P(r)ogram(me)	Writer Mike Crawley	TV series, 1 episode
1998	The Russell Gilbert Show	Russell's brother David	TV series, 1 episode
2000	Introducing Gary Petty	Ponna	TV series, 1 episode
2002	Stingers	Brendan West	TV series, 1 episode
2003	Pizza	Referee	TV series, 1 episode
2005	Let Loose Live	Various characters	TV series, 2 episodes
2014	Utopia	Nathan	TV series, 1 episode
2017	HActresses	Tommy McFarlane	TV series, 4 episodes
2018	Dave	Dave	TV special, 1 episode
2018	Pilot Week	Dave	TV series, 1 episode
2021	Fisk	Bob	TV series, 2 episodes
2025	Claire Hooper's House Of Games	Self	5 episodes

=== Television (as self) ===
Year	Title	Role	Type
1995	Something Hot Before Bed	Self	TV series
1996	Full Frontal	Guest performer	TV series, 1 episode
1997	Under Melbourne Tonight	Guest	Christmas special
1997	Headliners	Host	TV series
1998–2011	Good News Week	Panellist	TV series, 8 episodes
1999	Hessie’s Shed	Self	TV series, 1 episode
1999	O'Loghlin on Saturday Night	Self	TV series, 1 episode
1999	The Loft Live	Guest comedian	TV series, 1 episode
1999	The Mick Molloy Show	Self	TV series, 6 episodes
1999	The Loft Live	Comedian	TV series, 1 episode
2000	The Loft Live Comedy Benefit	Comedian	TV special, 1 episode
2000–01	The Big Schmooze	Self	TV series, 43 episodes
2000–02	The Fat	Guest	TV series, 3 episodes
2000–05	Rove Live	Guest	TV series, 3 episodes
2001	The Micallef P(r)ogram(me)	Self	TV series, 1 episode
2001; 2021	Melbourne International Comedy Festival	Comedian	TV special, 2 episode
2002–03	The Panel	Comedian	TV series, 1 episode
2003	Micallef Tonight	Self	TV series, 1 episode
2005–24	Spicks and Specks	Regular team member	TV series, 68 episodes
2006	Dancing with the Stars	Contestant	TV series, 1 episode
2006	Australia's Brainiest	Self	TV series, 1 episode
2006	Real Stories	Self	TV series, 1 episode
2007	The Nation	Self	TV series, 1 episode
2010	Sleuth 101	Guest detective	TV series, 1 episode
2011	Statesmen of Comedy	Guest	TV series, 1 episode
2011	You Have Been Watching	Guest	TV series, 1 episode
2011–13	Can of Worms	Comedian	TV series, 3 episodes
2011–13	Adam Hills In Gordon Street Tonight	Regular guest	TV series, 20 episodes
2012	Talkin’ Bout Your Generation	Contestant	TV series, 1 episode
2012	Randling	Contestant	TV series, 7 episodes
2013	Tractor Monkeys	Team Captain	TV series, 17 episodes
2013–15	Total Agony	Self	TV series, 22 episodes
2014	Community Kitchen	Guest	TV series, 1 episode
2014	Fancy Boy	Comedian	TV series, 1 episode
2014–16	Comedy Up Late	Self	TV series, 3 episodes
2015	Comedians in Bars Drinking Beer	Self	TV series, 1 episode
2015	About Tonight	Guest	TV series, 1 episode
2015	Darren & Brose	Guest	TV series, 1 episode
2015	How Not to Behave	Self	TV series, 1 episode
2016	All Star Family Feud	Contestant	TV series, 1 episode
2019	Show Me the Movie!	Panellist	TV series, 1 episode
2019	Have You Been Paying Attention?	Panellist	TV series, 1 episode
2018–2020	Hughesy, We Have a Problem	Self	TV series, 6 episodes
2022	Tomorrow Tonight	Panellist	TV series, 1 episode
2022	Question Everything	Panellist	TV series, 1 episode
2023	The Project	Guest	TV series, 1 episode
