= Micallef Tonight =

2003 Australian TV series

- Written by: Matt Cameron; Gary McCaffrie; Shaun Micallef; Michael Ward
- Directed by: Adrian Dellevergin
- Presented by: Shaun Micallef
- Starring: Francis Greenslade; Jason Geary
- Voices of: Pete Smith
- Composer: Yuri Worontschak
- Country of origin: Australia
- No. of episodes: 13

Production
- Executive producer: Todd Abbott
- Producer: Margaret Bashfield
- Running time: approx 60 minutes (plus commercials)

Original release
- Network: Nine Network
- Release: 12 May – 4 August 2003

Micallef Tonight was a short-lived Aria Award-winning Australian variety show that aired on the Nine Network in 2003. It was hosted by comedian Shaun Micallef and also featured the talents of Francis Greenslade, Jason Geary, Livinia Nixon and Pete Smith.

== Show content ==
Much like a typical variety show, each episode of Micallef Tonight featured a number of interviews with celebrities bookended by regular segments (such as "Shaun on his High Horse", which featured Micallef ranting against pop culture while straddling a gymnast vaulting horse) and a musical performance. However at times the show also delved into the realm of parody, such as introducing guest Jamie Durie with a long-winded opening only to dismiss him immediately afterwards since there was nothing left to discuss, and requesting that guest Alison Whyte hold an inflatable fish while Micallef himself danced on his desk, in an otherwise unrelated interview.

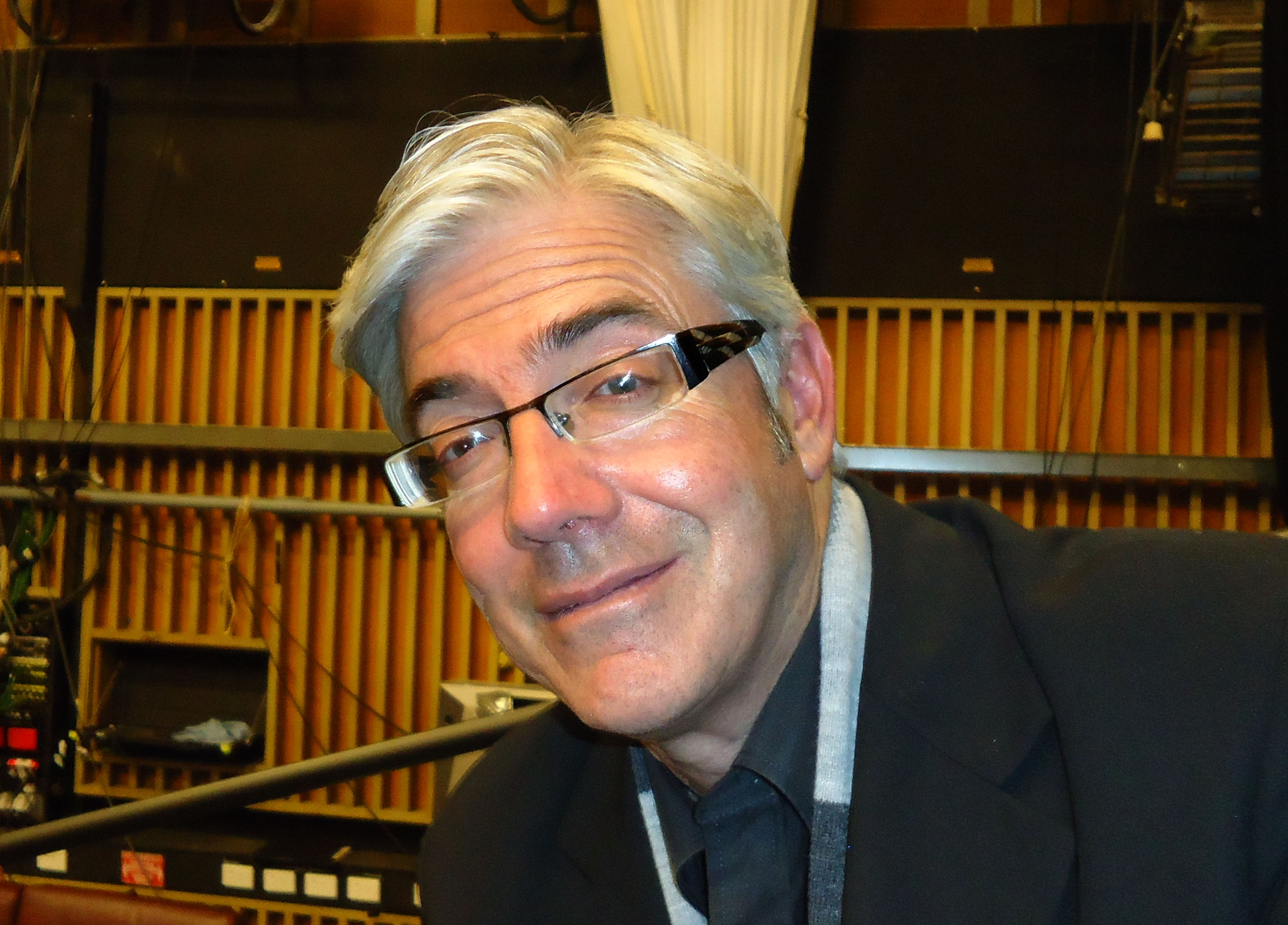
Host Shaun Micallef

Other in-show shenanigans included stealing musical guest Delta Goodrem's shoes as she played the piano, deliberately leaving actress Melissa George, live via satellite from Hollywood, on hold for over five minutes (she had guest starred in a supersized episode of Friends earlier that night, effectively delaying the broadcast of Micallef Tonight by several minutes), and requesting singers insert random words in to their musical performances to prove they weren't lip-synching. Notable examples were David Campbell inserting the word "lamington" into his performance and Amiel inserting the word "dolphinarium".

Micallef would end each episode with the line "See you in the Monkey House Australia!" and the show would usually close with a musical performance from Greenslade that was never quite what the audience expected; such as a rendition of Billy Joel's "Piano Man" played on the guitar.

Micallef previously parodied the variety show format with 1998's The Micallef Program.

== Episodes ==
Ep#	Airdate	Guest Stars
01	12 May 2003	Barry Humphries, Kath & Kim, Jamie Durie, Dannii Minogue, Sigrid Thornton, $10.90 Chicken Parmigiana
02	19 May 2003	Gary Sweet, Bridie Carter, Gérard Depardieu, Shakaya
03	26 May 2003	Alison Whyte, Shane Warne, David Campbell
04	2 June 2003	Jimeoin, Melissa George, Erik Thomson, The Whitlams, Jose Feliciano, $10.90 Chicken Parmigiana
05	9 June 2003	Judith Lucy, Matt Welsh, Warren & Gavin (The Block), Percy Sledge, Kerri-Anne Kennerley
06	16 June 2003	Delta Goodrem, Ben Elton, George Gregan, Matt Welsh
07	23 June 2003	Caroline Craig, John McEnroe, Amiel, Shane Crawford, Rhonda Burchmore
08	30 June 2003	Dave Hughes, Anthony LaPaglia, Birtles Shorrock Goble,
09	7 July 2003	Craig David, Marcus Graham, Nicole Livingstone, David Bridie
10	14 July 2003	Mick Molloy, Bob Franklin, Judith Lucy, Amity Dry, Blair McDonough
11	21 July 2003	Michael McKean, Seann William Scott, Todd Woodbridge, Placebo, Simon Tedeschi, Dave Graney, Clare Moore, Bad Eggs Orchestra
12	28 July 2003	Clive James, Tony Martin, The Superjesus,
13	4 August 2003	Ricky Martin, Keith Urban, Dave O'Neil, The Dandy Warhols

== Cancellation ==
The series premiered on 12 May 2003 and thirteen episodes were aired. The first episode rated strongly and although ratings declined steadily thereafter, it was announced in June 2003 that the series would be extended for a further 20 weeks.

Episode 12 (28 July) included a segment involving a midget hassling random restaurant patrons; after it screened, guest Tony Martin pointed out that the last show he had been involved in which featured the same midget actor -- (The Mick Molloy Show) -- had been axed. In an example of history repeating itself, Micallef Tonight was cancelled the following week. In addition, on an earlier episode during a live cross to promote the movie Bad Eggs, a visibly intoxicated Mick Molloy warned Micallef to "watch (his) arse" when he learned that the show was on the Nine Network.

Micallef ended his series with an interview with Ricky Martin in which both he and Martin used an expletive on live television, then called Nine Network live on air to complain about the language used on his show. Ironically, the interview was pre-recorded in the previous week to fit in with Martin's schedule, a fact alluded to by both Micallef and comedian Dave O'Neil during the actual live segments of the episode.

At the conclusion of what ended up being the final show, Micallef said that band The Dandy Warhols would be on the next week's show. The camera cut to the band on stage, ready to perform. Micallef informed the band that it was the next week they were meant to be on.

== Critical reception ==
Similarly to the equally short-lived The Mick Molloy Show (also shown on Nine), Micallef Tonight was ostensibly cancelled because of dwindling ratings, in this case against fellow comedian Andrew Denton's interview series Enough Rope. In a memorable parody, whilst Dannii Minogue was performing on Shaun's show, the camera cut to him only to see Shaun watching Andrew Denton's show (which aired simultaneously on another channel).

Critics also claimed that the show may have been too sophisticated for most audiences on the notoriously "mainstream" Nine Network, and was an acquired taste. Others have said that part of the axing was due to a segment which made fun of Alan Jones' morning message segment on Today. The segment began with one video on screen then became two, then four, then eight, then sixteen, and so on until it reached dozens and although nothing said was comprehensible, they all ended at the same time with 'I'm Alan Jones'. This segment apparently angered Nine Network owner Kerry Packer (who was also a close friend of Jones), and he ordered the show to be axed after less-than-impressive ratings for what turned out to be the final episode.

At the time of its airing, the show was critically acclaimed and became a cult favorite, even having followers internationally due to its irreverent humor and absurdity.

== DVD releases ==
The Micallef Tonight show was released on DVD as a "best of" compilation, that included some un-aired material. The Expurgated Micallef Tonight: The Very Best of Shaun Micallef's Short-Lived but Brilliant Tonight Show was released through Shock on 26 November 2007. On 19 October 2008 the DVD release won an ARIA Award for best comedy release. The DVD included a commentary track on part of the contents, featuring Micallef and guest Tony Martin (who appeared in episode 12 and also in the un-aired pilot).

The DVD is also available as part of the DVD box set The Collected Shaun Micallef which was released in 2011 by Shock Records. The set features 10 discs, containing The Expurgated Micallef Tonight, The Incompleat Shaun Micallef (highlights of his work on Full Frontal) and all three seasons of The Micallef Program as well as a bonus audio CD His Generation.

== Awards ==
- 2008 Aria Award Best Comedy Release - The Expurgated Micallef Tonight: The Very Best of Shaun Micallef's Short-Lived but Brilliant Tonight Show

== See also ==
- List of Australian television series
