= Welcher =

Welcher may refer to:

- Welcher & Welcher, Australian sitcom
- Dan Welcher (born 1948), American composer
