= Bob Franklin (comedian) =

British-Australian comedian and actor

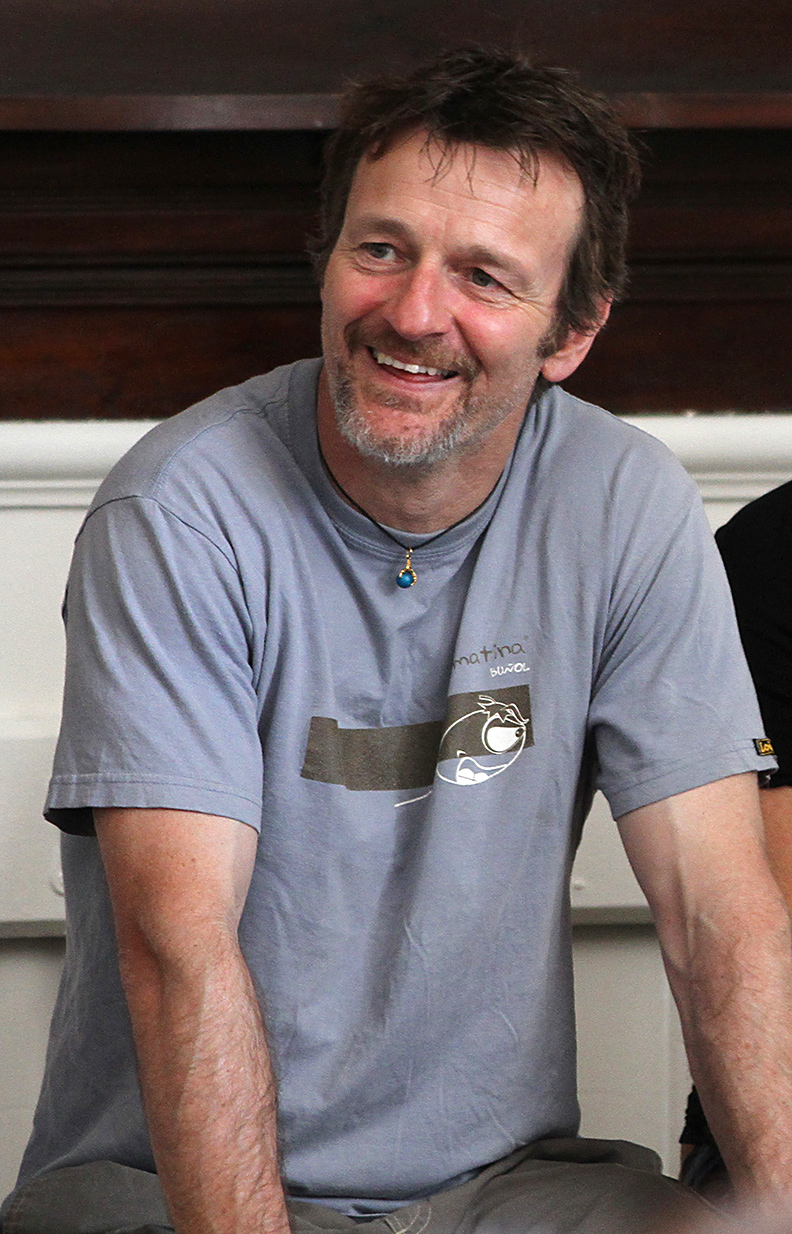
- Franklin at a live performance in 2011
- Born: Robert Andrew Franklin; 1965 (age 60–61); Hillingdon, London, United Kingdom

Comedy career
- Genres: Stand-up comedy, Television, Film

Robert Andrew Franklin (born 1965), is a Hillingdon, London-born, Welsh raised, comedian who has lived in Australia since 1989.

== Career ==
=== Television ===
On Australian television, Franklin was both writer and performer on Jimeoin (1994–95), Shaun Micallef's World Around Him (1996), Small Tales & True (1998), Eric (1997), The Mick Molloy Show (1999) and Introducing Gary Petty (2000), in which he played the title role and received an Australian Writers' Guild award nomination.

Franklin has also acted in TV dramas such as Kangaroo Palace (1997), Stingers (2002), After the Deluge (2003), CrashBurn (2003), The Heartbreak Tour (2005), Tripping Over (2006) and an episode of The Adventures of Lano and Woodley ("Starquest").

From 2016 to 2021, Franklin had a recurring role as Brendan O'Grady in the Jack Irish films and television series.

Franklin has made several appearances on Thank God You're Here and was in the sitcoms The Librarians, and Stupid Stupid Man.

Franklin starred in an episode of Shaun Micallef's TV series Mr & Mrs Murder, ("The Art of Murder") as Jack, a homeless gentleman with an exquisite eye for class and beauty. He had a recurring role in the second and third series of Please Like Me, a drama by Australian comedian Josh Thomas. Franklin also featured as a loan shark in the Australian opera miniseries The Divorce.

=== Film ===
Franklin has appeared in several Australian films, including The Craic (1999), You Can't Stop The Murders (2003), Bad Eggs (2003), The Extra (2005), Macbeth (2006), BoyTown (2006) The Last Confession of Alexander Pearce (2008), Three Blind Mice (2008) and Beneath Hill 60 (2010).

=== Books ===
Franklin's first book Under Stones, a collection of 'tales of unease', was published in 2010 by Affirm Press. It won the 2010 Australian Shadows Award for Long Fiction.

His debut novel, Moving Tigers, was published in 2015.

== Filmography ==
=== Television ===
Year	Title	Role	Type
1994-95	Jimeoin	Various characters	TV sketch series, 25 episodes
1996	Shaun Micallef's World Around Him	Various characters	TV sketch series
1997	Eric	Various characters	TV sketch series, 9 episodes
1997	Kangaroo Palace	Policeman	TV miniseries
1997	The Adventures of Lano and Woodley	Gary	TV series, season 1, episode: "Starquest"
1998	The Micallef P(r)ogram(me)	Various characters	TV series, 1 episode
1998	Small Tales & True	Tom Dunleavy / Brian Tonkin / Limey / Rev Noel Foulis / Fraser Walsh / Dave	TV series, 6 episodes
1999	The Mick Molloy Show	Himself	TV series
2000	Introducing Gary Petty	Gary Petty	TV series, 6 episodes
2002	Stingers	Leo	TV series, 1 episode
2003	CrashBurn	Theo	TV series, 13 episodes
2003	After the Deluge	Sid	TV movie
2004	Stories from the Golf	Kyle / Trevor	TV series, 2 episodes
2004–05	Eagle & Evans	Head of 'Big Nasty Planet' / Comedian / Movie Star	TV series, 3 episodes
2005	The Heartbreak Tour	Alan	TV movie
2006	Tripping Over	Mr Allenby	TV miniseries, 2 episodes
2006-08	Stupid Stupid Man	Dave Muir	TV series
2006-09	Thank God You're Here	Himself	TV series
2007	BoyTown Confidential	Bobby Mac	Video
2007	Newstopia	Jasper Clutterbuck	TV series, 1 episode
2007-10	The Librarians	Neil Slider	TV series, 19 episodes
2010	The Librarians in Profile	Sir Robert Franklin	TV series, 16 episodes
2010	City Homicide	Dennis Monk	TV series, 1 episode
2011	Rush	Restaurant Manager	TV series, 1 episode
2011	SLiDE	Mr Lancaster	TV series, 2 episodes
2011	Mollusks	Mofo / Crab Gang Member	TV series, 6 episodes
2012	Howzat! Kerry Packer's War	Hove Gate Attendant	TV miniseries, 1 episode
2013	Mr & Mrs Murder	Jack	TV miniseries, episode 1: "The Art of Murder"
2013	Leongatha	Terry	TV series, 1 episode
2013	Upper Middle Bogan	Bob	TV series, 1 episode
2014	The Flamin’ Thongs	House (voice)	Animated TV series, 1 episode
2014	Worst Year of My Life Again	Sandwich Shack Waiter	TV series, 1 episode
2014-15	Please Like Me	Stuart	TV series, 9 episodes
2015	The Divorce	Alfie (Loan Shark)	TV miniseries, 4 episodes
2016-21	Jack Irish	Brendan O'Grady	TV series & TV films, 11 episodes
2017	True Story with Hamish & Andy	Wise Man of the Sea	TV series, 1 episode
2017	The Ex-PM	Keith	TV series, 1 episode
2019	Rostered On	Laptop Customer	TV series, 1 episode
2019	The Inbestigators	Coach	TV mockumentary series, 1 episode
2021	Fires	Graham on Radio	TV miniseries, 1 episode
2022	Fisk	Laurie	TV series, 2 episodes
2023	Bay of Fires	Connor	TV miniseries, 7 episodes

=== Film ===
Year	Title	Role	Type
1999	The Craic	Bob	Feature film
2002	Guru Wayne	Detective Lee	Feature film
2003	You Can't Stop The Murders	Mongo	Feature film
2003	Bad Eggs	Detective Mike Paddock	Feature film
2005	The Extra	Marco	Feature film
2006	Macbeth	Siward	Feature film
2006	BoyTown	Bobby Mac	Feature film
2008	Three Blind Mice	Warren	Feature film
2008	The Last Confession of Alexander Pearce	Matthew Travers	Feature film
2010	Beneath Hill 60	Potsy	Feature film
2010	Scottish Bob	Bob	Short film
2010	Rigor Mortis	Bob	Short film
