= Preincarnate (novel) =

Book by Shaun Micallef

- First edition cover
- Author: Shaun Micallef
- Language: English
- Genre: Science fiction Alternate history
- Publisher: Hardie Grant Books
- Publication date: November 1, 2010
- Publication place: Australia
- Media type: Print (hardcover)
- Pages: 228
- ISBN: 978-1-74066-981-8
- Preceded by: Smithereens
- Followed by: N/A

Preincarnate is a 2010 novella written by Australian author and comedian Shaun Micallef with illustrations by Bill Wood. It focuses upon the intricacies of time travel, suspended animation and one man's journey across various time eras.
