= David M. Green =

Australian comedian (b. 1987)

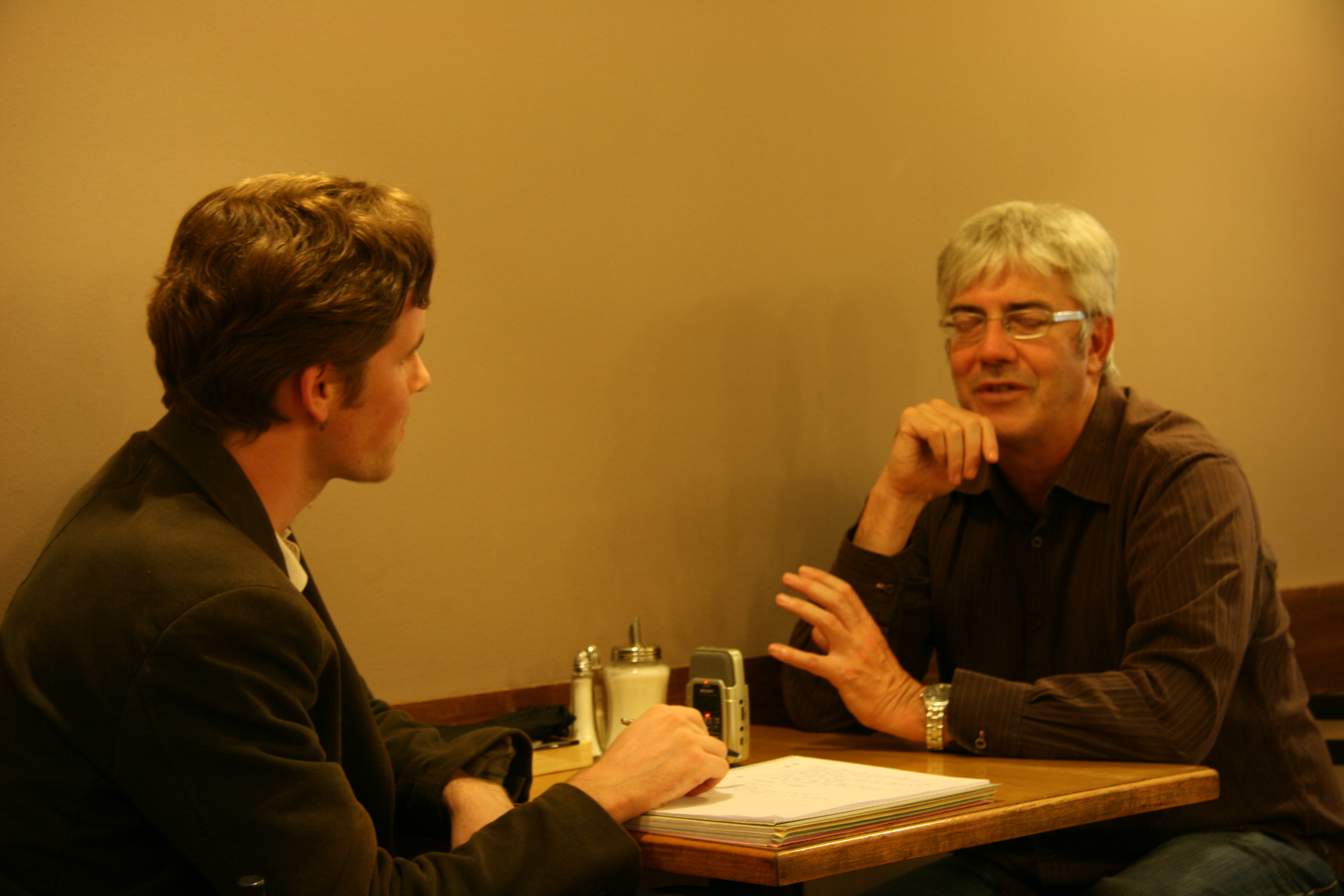
Green interviewing Shaun Micallef in 2010.

David Michael Green is an Australian comedian, writer and YouTube personality from Adelaide, now based in Melbourne. He is known for his work on Shaun Micallef's Mad as Hell and also the YouTube series VHS Revue in which he showcases old TV advertisements found on VHS tapes. In 2020, a photo of his old South Australian driver's licence was used on the Optus website without his permission.
