= Mr & Mrs Murder =

- Genre: Crime comedy Mystery
- Created by: Shaun Micallef; Jason Stephens
- Starring: Shaun Micallef; Kat Stewart; Jonny Pasvolsky; Lucy Honigman
- Composers: Dan Luscombe & Echo Set
- Country of origin: Australia
- Original language: English
- No. of series: 1
- No. of episodes: 13

Production
- Executive producers: Rick Maier; Jason Stephens
- Producers: Andrew Walker; Jason Stephens
- Production locations: Melbourne, Victoria, Australia
- Running time: ~45 minutes in a 60 minute timeslot
- Production companies: FremantleMedia Australia; Bravado Productions

Original release
- Network: Network Ten
- Release: 20 February – 15 May 2013

Mr & Mrs Murder is a 13-part Australian crime comedy television series produced by FremantleMedia Australia in association with Bravado Productions. It originally ran on Network Ten on from 20 February to 15 May 2013. The murder mystery series follows the adventures of married couple Nicola and Charlie Buchanan, who run an industrial cleaning business specialising in crime scenes. They use this experience to become amateur sleuths. In the United Kingdom, the show was shown on satellite channel Sky Living, and picked up for broadcast by Channel 5 from Network Ten along with the shows Wentworth and Secrets and Lies.

== Cast ==
=== Main / recurring ===
- Shaun Micallef as Charlie Buchanan
- Kat Stewart as Nicola Buchanan
- Jonny Pasvolsky as Detective Peter Vinetti
- Ben Geurens as Alan
- Lucy Honigman as Jess Chalmers
- Bob Franklin as Jack
- Dwayne Cameron as Ryan Coltrane
- Damon Gameau as Tom Di Biasi

=== Guests ===
- Andrea Demetriades as Lola
- Ashley Zukerman as Alex Moran
- Christian Clark as Stephen
- Clayton Watson as Bruce
- Dan O’Connor as Brody Bennett
- Daniel Henshall as Gregor Cheresniak
- Danielle Carter as Annie Bell
- Diana Glenn as Gabi Ellroy
- Eliza Taylor as Sarah
- Ella Scott Lynch as Emily Gorman
- Ewen Leslie as Hugo
- Georgia Chara as Jennifer Travers
- Georgina Naidu as Janine
- Helen Thomson as Olivia Patterson
- Ian Bliss as Robin Boydell
- Jack Finsterer as Dwayne Nash
- Jessica Gower as Elena Scrletta
- Jessica Tovey as Claire Rickard-Smith
- Julia Blake as Allegra Scaletta
- Lisa Hensley as Yvette Nailor
- Marta Kaczmarek as Malina Cheresniak
- Nick Simpson-Deeks as Tyler Betts
- Peter Phelps as Paul Craven
- Robert Taylor as Alistair Travers
- Roz Hammond as Deborah Newhouse
- Ryan Johnson as Michael Gorman
- Syd Brisbane as Lincoln

== Episodes ==
No.	Title	Directed by	Written by	Original release date	Australian viewers (millions)
1	"Early Checkout"	Shirley Barrett	Kirsty Fisher	20 February 2013	0.959
When national hero Marty O'Connor is murdered in a luxury hotel, Charlie and Nicola set out to solve the murder and clear an innocent person.
2	"A Dog's Life"	Sian Davies	John Hugginson	27 February 2013	0.836
A dispute occurs between a dog walking group and local golf course members after which golf champion Keith Skinner is mauled to death by a dog.
3	"En Vogue"	Sian Davis	Marieke Hardy	6 March 2013	0.719
Fashion designer Jonah Ellroy is killed by a flying mirror during the finale of his runway show; Charlie and Nicola investigate.
4	"Atlas Drugged"	Shirley Barrett	Bridie O'Neill	13 March 2013	0.695
It's a murderous level of muscle burn when champion bodybuilder Anton is found drugged and baked to death on a sunbed.
5	"Lost Soul"	Daniel Nettheim	Christine Bartlett	20 March 2013	0.567
They say life's a cabaret, but that's hardly the case when leading lady Linda is found dead...
6	"The Next Best Man"	Sian Davis	Sian Davis	27 March 2013	0.818
Something old, something new, something borrowed, someone dead.
7	"Thoroughly Dead Thoroughbred"	Peter Salmon	Jay Barnes	3 April 2013	0.698
When Cardwell Stable's vet Evelyn is murdered with an overdose of ketamine, Nicola and Charlie sidle up to investigate.
8	"A Flare for Murder"	Peter Salmon	Timothy Hobart	10 April 2013	0.548
It's more than a shot across the bow when young solo sailor Jennifer Travers is murdered on her yacht with a flare gun.
9	"The Art of Murder"	Abe Forsythe	Timothy Hobart	17 April 2013	0.638
It's murder for art's sake when a homeless man is found crushed to death under a floating wall at a modern art gallery.
10	"Little Boxes"	Jet Wilkinson	Harold Jordan	24 April 2013	0.540
When upper crust James Langlan is found harpooned through the chest with a spear gun in a heritage bathing box, it sends a dark ripple through a wealthy seaside community.
11	"Keeping Up Appearances"	Jet Wilkinson	Katherine Thomson	1 May 2013	0.469 (Overnight)
In the middle of the night, a beautiful young woman named Ivy falls to her death from the window of a prominent plastic surgery clinic.
12	"Zootopia"	Daniel Nettheim	Jonathan Gavin	8 May 2013	0.523 (Overnight)
When Glen the big cat keeper dies and Marie the hippo keeper goes missing, it looks like the food chain has been reversed at Maabade Zoo.
13	"The Course Whisperer"	Unknown	Unknown	15 May 2013	0.454 (Overnight)
It's a recipe for murder when maestro chef Bryce Cormac is killed in the kitchen of his renowned restaurant, Razorback.

== DVD and Blu-ray releases ==
Mr & Mrs Murder: Series One
Set details: Supplier / Publisher - Roadshow; Region 4 DVD – 4-disc set	Features: 13 episodes
Release dates:	Region 4
Release dates:	19 June 2013

== See also ==
- Crime Scene Cleaner (TV series)
