= Shaun Micallef's Mad as Hell =

2012–2022 Australian comedy TV series

- Also known as: Mad as Hell
- Genre: Satire, news, comedy, dark comedy
- Written by: Shaun Micallef; Gary McCaffrie; Michael Ward; Tony Moclair; David M. Green; Alasdair Tremblay-Birchall; Andy Matthews; Laura Davis; Pat McCaffrie; Cassie Workman; Bec Petraitis
- Directed by: Jon Olb; Bradley J. Howard
- Presented by: Shaun Micallef
- Starring: Francis Greenslade; Roz Hammond; Veronica Milsom; Tosh Greenslade; Emily Taheny; Stephen Hall; Nicholas Bell; Molly Daniels; Ming-Zhu Hii; Michelle Brasier; Christie Whelan Browne
- Country of origin: Australia
- Original language: English
- No. of series: 15
- No. of episodes: 172

Production
- Executive producers: Peter Beck; Tarni James; Shaun Micallef
- Producers: Rachel Millar; Richard Kelly; Paul Coughlin
- Production locations: Gordon Street, Elsternwick, Melbourne, Victoria, Australia (2012–2017); Southbank, Melbourne, Victoria, Australia (2018–2022)
- Cinematography: Leon De Pettri
- Editor: Nathan Wild
- Running time: 30 minutes
- Production companies: Giant Baby Productions; ITV Studios Australia (Note: Known as Granada Media Australia during Series 1)

Original release
- Network: ABC
- Release: 25 May 2012 – 21 September 2022

Shaun Micallef's Mad as Hell is an Australian comedy news television program hosted by Shaun Micallef. The show first aired on ABC at 8:00 pm on Friday 25 May 2012. The show was named as Most Outstanding Comedy Program at the Logie Awards of 2016. Its title is a reference to the 1976 American satirical black comedy-drama film Network.

== Cast ==
Micallef hosts the program, with at least five other cast members appearing, each as multiple characters, including Micallef.

Full cast list, with series details highlighted
Name	Series 1	Series 2	Series 3	Series 4	Series 5	Series 6	Series 7	Series 8	Series 9	Series 10	Series 11	Series 12	Series 13	Series 14	Series 15
Shaun Micallef	Main														
Francis Greenslade (Note: Unrelated to Tosh.)	Main														
Tosh Greenslade (Note: Unrelated to Francis.)	Main														
Emily Taheny	Main														
Stephen Hall	Recurring	Main													
Veronica Milsom	Main														
Roz Hammond	Main										Guest				Guest
Nicholas Bell						Main									
Molly Daniels									Main						
Ming-Zhu Hii									Main						
Michelle Brasier										Main					
Christie Whelan Browne										Main					
Kate Jenkinson															Recurring

== Broadcast ==
The program was commissioned without a pilot and the first series of 10 episodes originally screened from May to July 2012. The show was renewed for a second series of 12 episodes which aired in 2013. A third was announced in January 2014 and consisted of 10 episodes, shown weekly from 12 February 2014. A fourth series premiered later in the same year on 24 September 2014 and the fifth series premiered on 11 February 2015. A sixth series debuted on 11 May 2016. The show's seventh series commenced on 21 June 2017. An eighth series debuted on 31 January 2018, with a ninth series running from September 2018. A tenth series was confirmed for July 2019 by Micallef on Twitter in December 2018 and it debuted on 26 June 2019.

At the ABC 2020 Upfronts, Micallef confirmed that two series would be produced in 2020, starting with series 11, to air in early February. The second half of the eleventh series saw the show taping without an audience, due to social distancing requirements amid the COVID-19 pandemic. The twelfth series was scheduled to commence 5 August; and began by recording new episodes without an audience. A special Christmas episode was broadcast on 20 December 2020.

In July 2022, news broke that the show would not be returning with its current cast. Shaun clarified that discussions were ongoing with the ABC regarding evolving the show, but confirmed that the "original version" with Shaun in the main chair would not be returning forever.

== Recurring segments and characters ==
Bill Shorten's Zingers

A regular segment during the early period of Bill Shorten's tenure as Leader of the Opposition. Micallef would play a short video clip of Shorten delivering a pun, dad joke or similar, usually when he was criticising the government, after which "Zinger!" would appear in bold text on the screen with a roaring sound for humorous effect. The segment was noticed by Shorten himself, as he referenced it in a press conference when attacking the government on its funding cuts to the ABC, after which he said "I tell you what, I tell you Shaun Micallef, I'm as mad as hell and we'll fight for your show." This was made a zinger in the subsequent week's episode of the show.

Lamentable Puns

Micallef and "junior sub-editor" of the Daily Telegraph, Chris Lorax (played by Tosh Greenslade), go through a series of front page and article headlines of the newspaper. Micallef shows the headline in question for Lorax to explain, much to Micallef's bemusement over both the headline and Lorax's justification for it. Lorax usually responds to Micallef's bemusement with "It’s just a bit of fun."

Political Singers/Clockwork Satirists

Often when prominent politicians were mentioned, they were immediately followed by a clip of singers incorporating their names into a song. For example, the mention of Barnaby Joyce was immediately followed by three USAAF women singing "Is that the Chattanooga Choo Choo?", and the mention of then Indonesian President Susilo Bambang Yudhoyono was followed by characters from the film Chitty Chitty Bang Bang singing "Yudhoyono Bambang, Yudhoyono Bambang, our fine four-fendered friend!". Also featured longer songs, such as a parody of Fashion that criticizes the Foreign Fighters Act of 2014 with Micallef himself participating, impersonating Christopher Walken.

HYPERthetical

A segment where Micallef moderates a debate between several people about a hypothetical issue. Topics discussed in the segment include euthanasia and same-sex marriage. This segment is a parody of the ABC show Tomorrow Tonight which was hosted by Charlie Pickering and Annabel Crabb.

Tony from Border Force

Played by Stephen Hall. Appearing from series 3 onwards, would often appear at the end of segments and subdue unwelcome guests such as the Kraken with a taser and drag them off the set. He would often do this to left-leaning characters too if their criticism of the Abbott government became too sharp.

Darius Horsham

Played by Stephen Hall. Spokesperson (sometimes stylised as "$pokesb0rg") for the Minister for Finance, Mathias Cormann. He speaks in a thick Germanic accent in a parody of Arnold Schwarzenegger and Cormann himself, and often seen aggressively chewing on a cigar – in reference to controversy caused when Cormann and Joe Hockey were filmed smoking cigars after delivering the 2014 Federal Budget. When asked by Micallef to elaborate on a point made, or is otherwise criticised, he usually responds with "Don't be an economic girly-man" or some variation. Cormann himself, presumably in reference to the character, referred to Bill Shorten as an "economic girly-man".

Dolly Norman

Played by Roz Hammond. The simple speaking and thinking speechwriter to politician Jacqui Lambie. Often includes short film clips of Lambie saying something seemingly nonsensical or offensive, to which Norman responds by explaining what Lambie "really meant". Her segments usually ended with a shot of Micallef looking aside to the camera in the style of Frank Underwood and making a remark to the audience in a southern accent with Norman staring vacantly in the background.

Vomitoria Catchment

Played by Roz Hammond. A right-wing blogger that was a loose parody of Miranda Devine, acts in a very smug manner while criticizing the then Labor government. Later becomes Press Secretary to Tony Abbott after the 2013 election.

Lois Price

Played by Emily Taheny. A play on the "traffic chopper" on morning television programs reporting on traffic conditions, only Lois Price reports on current events. She usually finishes by seamlessly pivoting to an advertorial before signing off with "I'm Lois Price from Mad as Hell."

Tosh Greenslade

Played by himself. Micallef will usually introduce him as "Tosh Greenslade in a wig and glasses to talk about ..." (to which Greenslade's intro is usually "exactly right, Shaun") to explain the "reasons" behind government policy using novel concepts for humorous effect. In one episode, for example, Greenslade "explained" the government's asylum seeker boat turn-back policy using the layers of a lamington. Micallef then signs him out with a variation of the line "that was Tosh Greenslade in a wig and glasses talking about ...".

Casper Jonquil

Played by Tosh Greenslade. A parody of a talkback radio shock jock and listener who complains loudly and unintelligibly. Jonquil has appeared since Series 2, and is seen to have had various occupations, including one sketch in which he claims to be a qualified osteopath, and another in which he is a member of the local neighbourhood watch, claiming that the boyfriend of his love interest, Spakfilla Vole, is in fact a terrorist. He also is shown to host his own talk show, Right Minded, and in one sketch, a quiz show, Why the Hell?, a parody of the real ABC quiz show Hard Quiz.

Vice Rear Cabin Boy Sir Bobo Gargle

Played by Francis Greenslade. Vice Rear Cabin Boy [sic] Sir Bobo Gargle is a Royal Australian Navy officer who appears on the show to discuss Australian and international maritime matters. Sir Bobo Gargle usually ends his interviews by releasing the Kraken (played by Michael Ward, one of the show's writers).

Larry Sideburns

Played by Francis Greenslade. Often appears as a plot character in sketches as well as other segments of the show and is portrayed as an entrepreneur trying to monetise his next big thing. Often featured alongside his wife who is often spoken over.

Draymella Burt

Played by Emily Taheny. Draymella Burt is a spokesperson for the Liberal Party. She is best known for her brutal quips at Shaun about his left-wing bias. In 2021, Micallef noted on Twitter that Draymella was a character created in 2013, while Queensland Senator Amanda Stoker only entered parliament in 2018, pointing out their coincidental similarities.

Brion Pegmatite

Played by Tosh Greenslade. Brion Pegmatite is a spokesperson for Peter Dutton. He finds it painful to show remorse, pleasure or compassion, and is often seen wanting vengeance against Scott Morrison and other members of the Liberal Party, especially when leadership is brought into question.

Tamara Happenstance

Played by Christie Whelan Browne. Tourism Australia ambassador. Portrayed as a character wearing an Australian outback hat with corks dangling off the sides, as well as an apron with 'G’day' written on it with an image of the Australian flag. She often ends her sentences with common Australian tropes such as "put a shrimp on the barbie you bastards" that become increasingly vulgar as the segment progresses.

Ian Orbspider

Played by Francis Greenslade. An enthusiastic scientist that's a loose parody of Dr Karl, dresses in colourful shirts and usually speaks eagerly about scientific matters. Almost invariably becomes struck by lightning in every appearance and is reduced to skeletal remains. In one case he was struck at the start of his segment but continued to speak as a skeleton, then was struck again and returned to normal, much to his bewilderment.

Donald McEngadine

Played by Stephen Hall. Art Director and Dirt File Co-ordinator for then Prime Minister Scott Morrison, dresses in a high-vis vest and a hard hat. He assumes much of Morrison's mannerisms and speaking style as he attempts to spin negative stories into positives about his boss. Often at the end of the segments, he slowly "lumbers off the set like a hungry bear in search of berries".

Mary Brett-Punish

Played by Emily Taheny. Spokestherapist for then Attorney-General Michaelia Cash, speaks very forcefully and angrily about stories involving her employer. In particular she grows very annoyed by repeated use of stock footage of Cash marching briskly around Parliament with band music playing. In her final appearance, she marches off the set to the same music.

== Episodes ==
=== Series overview ===
Series	Episodes	Originally released	
Series	Episodes	First released	Last released
1	10	25 May 2012	27 July 2012
2	12	20 February 2013	24 April 2013
3	10	12 February 2014	16 April 2014
4	10	24 September 2014	26 November 2014
5	10	11 February 2015	15 April 2015
6	12	11 May 2016	27 July 2016
7	12	21 June 2017	6 September 2017
8	13	31 January 2018	25 April 2018
9	13	19 September 2018	12 December 2018
10	13	26 June 2019	18 September 2019
11	12	5 February 2020	22 April 2020
12	10 + 1 Special	5 August 2020	20 December 2020
13	12	26 May 2021	11 August 2021
14	12	2 February 2022	20 April 2022
15	10	20 July 2022	21 September 2022

=== Series 1 (2012) ===
No. in series	Title	Original release date	AUS viewers (millions)
1	"Episode 1"	25 May 2012	0.664
2	"Episode 2"	1 June 2012	0.565
3	"Episode 3"	8 June 2012	0.575
4	"Episode 4"	15 June 2012	0.529
5	"Episode 5"	22 June 2012	0.549
6	"Episode 6"	29 June 2012	0.495
7	"Episode 7"	6 July 2012	0.509
8	"Episode 8"	13 July 2012	0.481
9	"Episode 9"	20 July 2012	0.473
10	"Episode 10"	27 July 2012	0.544

=== Series 2 (2013) ===
No. in series	Title	Original release date	AUS viewers (millions)
11	"Episode 1"	20 February 2013	0.664
12	"Episode 2"	27 February 2013	0.574
13	"Episode 3"	6 March 2013	0.623
14	"Episode 4"	13 March 2013	0.596
15	"Episode 5"	20 March 2013	0.527
16	"Episode 6"	27 March 2013	0.625
17	"Episode 7"	3 April 2013	0.627
18	"Episode 8"	10 April 2013	0.627
19	"Episode 9"	17 April 2013	0.610
20	"Episode 10"	24 April 2013	0.617
21	"Episode 11"	1 May 2013	0.697
22	"Episode 12"	8 May 2013	0.671

=== Series 3 (2014) ===
No. in series	Title	Original release date	AUS viewers (millions)
23	"Episode 1"	12 February 2014	0.543
24	"Episode 2"	19 February 2014	0.527
25	"Episode 3"	26 February 2014	0.614
26	"Episode 4"	5 March 2014	0.596
27	"Episode 5"	12 March 2014	0.615
28	"Episode 6"	19 March 2014	0.668
29	"Episode 7"	26 March 2014	0.620
30	"Episode 8"	2 April 2014	0.619
31	"Episode 9"	9 April 2014	0.632
32	"Episode 10"	16 April 2014	0.760

=== Series 4 (2014) ===
No. in series	Title	Original release date	AUS viewers (millions)
33	"Episode 1"	24 September 2014	0.643
34	"Episode 2"	1 October 2014	0.570
35	"Episode 3"	8 October 2014	0.623
36	"Episode 4"	15 October 2014	0.729
37	"Episode 5"	22 October 2014	0.649
38	"Episode 6"	29 October 2014	0.699
39	"Episode 7"	5 November 2014	0.731
40	"Episode 8"	12 November 2014	0.741
41	"Episode 9"	19 November 2014	0.722
42	"Episode 10"	26 November 2014	0.733

=== Series 5 (2015) ===
No. in series	Title	Original release date	AUS viewers (millions)
43	"Episode 1"	11 February 2015	0.768
44	"Episode 2"	18 February 2015	0.737
45	"Episode 3"	25 February 2015	0.643
46	"Episode 4"	4 March 2015	0.606
47	"Episode 5"	11 March 2015	0.623
48	"Episode 6"	18 March 2015	0.735
49	"Episode 7"	25 March 2015	0.641
50	"Episode 8"	1 April 2015	0.782
51	"Episode 9"	8 April 2015	0.763
52	"Episode 10"	15 April 2015	0.678

=== Series 6 (2016) ===
No. in series	Title	Original release date	AUS viewers (millions)
53	"Episode 1"	11 May 2016	0.692
54	"Episode 2"	18 May 2016	0.625
55	"Episode 3"	25 May 2016	0.664
56	"Episode 4"	1 June 2016	0.505
57	"Episode 5"	8 June 2016	0.726
58	"Episode 6"	15 June 2016	0.682
59	"Episode 7"	22 June 2016	0.552
60	"Episode 8"	29 June 2016	0.681
61	"Episode 9"	6 July 2016	0.677
62	"Episode 10"	13 July 2016	0.574
63	"Episode 11"	20 July 2016	0.655
64	"Episode 12"	27 July 2016	0.710

=== Series 7 (2017) ===
No. in series	Title	Original release date	AUS viewers (millions)
65	"Episode 1"	21 June 2017	0.574
66	"Episode 2"	28 June 2017	0.622
67	"Episode 3"	5 July 2017	0.597
68	"Episode 4"	12 July 2017	0.468
69	"Episode 5"	19 July 2017	0.724
70	"Episode 6"	26 July 2017	0.640
71	"Episode 7"	2 August 2017	0.722
72	"Episode 8"	9 August 2017	0.748
73	"Episode 9"	16 August 2017	0.732
74	"Episode 10"	23 August 2017	0.723
75	"Episode 11"	30 August 2017	0.721
76	"Episode 12"	6 September 2017	0.740

This was the final season to be filmed at the ABC Ripponlea Studios, with episode 12 being one of the last TV shows filmed at the historic studios.

=== Series 8 (2018) ===
No. in series	Title	Original release date	AUS viewers (millions)
77	"Episode 1"	31 January 2018	0.568
78	"Episode 2"	7 February 2018	0.493
79	"Episode 3"	14 February 2018	0.489
80	"Episode 4"	21 February 2018	0.575
81	"Episode 5"	28 February 2018	0.561
82	"Episode 6"	7 March 2018	0.563
83	"Episode 7"	14 March 2018	0.671
84	"Episode 8"	21 March 2018	0.608
85	"Episode 9"	28 March 2018	0.605
86	"Episode 10"	4 April 2018	0.472
87	"Episode 11"	11 April 2018	0.544
88	"Episode 12"	18 April 2018	0.525
89	"Episode 13"	25 April 2018	0.534

=== Series 9 (2018) ===
No. in series	Title	Original release date	AUS viewers (millions)
90	"Episode 1"	19 September 2018	0.674
91	"Episode 2"	26 September 2018	0.609
92	"Episode 3"	3 October 2018	0.607
93	"Episode 4"	10 October 2018	0.651
94	"Episode 5"	17 October 2018	0.674
95	"Episode 6"	24 October 2018	0.616
96	"Episode 7"	31 October 2018	0.665
97	"Episode 8"	7 November 2018	0.745
98	"Episode 9"	14 November 2018	0.710
99	"Episode 10"	21 November 2018	0.683
100	"Episode 11"	28 November 2018	0.742
101	"Episode 12"	5 December 2018	0.675
102	"Episode 13"	12 December 2018	0.605

=== Series 10 (2019) ===
No. in series	Title	Original release date	AUS viewers (millions)
103	"Episode 1"	26 June 2019	0.569
104	"Episode 2"	3 July 2019	0.577
105	"Episode 3"	10 July 2019	0.395
106	"Episode 4"	18 July 2019^{a}	0.361
107	"Episode 5"	24 July 2019	0.607
108	"Episode 6"	31 July 2019	0.660
109	"Episode 7"	7 August 2019	0.611
110	"Episode 8"	14 August 2019	0.585
111	"Episode 9"	21 August 2019	0.683
112	"Episode 10"	28 August 2019	0.686
113	"Episode 11"	4 September 2019	0.498
114	"Episode 12"	11 September 2019	0.636
115	"Episode 13"	18 September 2019	0.602

Notes

a. Originally scheduled to air on 17 July, episode 3 was broadcast in error. The episode was subsequently released on ABC iview, and broadcast on 18 July on ABC TV.

=== Series 11 (2020) ===
No. in series	Title	Original release date	AUS viewers (millions)
116	"Episode 1"	5 February 2020	0.592
117	"Episode 2"	12 February 2020	0.577
118	"Episode 3"	19 February 2020	0.592
119	"Episode 4"	26 February 2020	0.614
120	"Episode 5"	4 March 2020	0.581
121	"Episode 6"	11 March 2020	0.565
122	"Episode 7"	18 March 2020	0.737
123	"Episode 8"	25 March 2020	0.757
124	"Episode 9"	1 April 2020	0.752
125	"Episode 10"	8 April 2020	0.715
126	"Episode 11"	15 April 2020	0.675
127	"Episode 12"	22 April 2020	0.671

=== Series 12 (2020) ===
No. in series	Title	Original release date	AUS viewers (millions)
128	"Episode 1"	5 August 2020	0.691
129	"Episode 2"	12 August 2020	0.598
130	"Episode 3"	19 August 2020	0.649
131	"Episode 4"	26 August 2020	0.622
132	"Episode 5"	2 September 2020	0.576
133	"Episode 6"	9 September 2020	0.588
134	"Episode 7"	16 September 2020	0.598
135	"Episode 8"	23 September 2020	0.572
136	"Episode 9"	30 September 2020	0.585
137	"Episode 10"	7 October 2020	0.542

=== Special (2020) ===
No. in series	Title	Original release date	AUS viewers (millions)
138	"Pagan Holiday Special"	20 December 2020	0.399

=== Series 13 (2021) ===
No. in series	Title	Original release date	AUS viewers (millions)
139	"Episode 1"	26 May 2021	0.572
140	"Episode 2"	2 June 2021	0.581
141	"Episode 3"	9 June 2021	0.467
142	"Episode 4"	16 June 2021	0.564
143	"Episode 5"	23 June 2021	0.507
144	"Episode 6"	30 June 2021	0.497
145	"Episode 7"	7 July 2021	0.500
146	"Episode 8"	14 July 2021	0.438
147	"Episode 9"	21 July 2021	0.549
148	"Episode 10"	28 July 2021	0.436
149	"Episode 11"	4 August 2021	0.415
150	"Episode 12"	11 August 2021	0.532

=== Series 14 (2022) ===
No. in series	Title	Original release date	AUS viewers (millions)
151	"Episode 1"	2 February 2022	0.541
152	"Episode 2"	9 February 2022	0.463
153	"Episode 3"	16 February 2022	0.482
154	"Episode 4"	23 February 2022	0.487
155	"Episode 5"	2 March 2022	0.485
156	"Episode 6"	9 March 2022	0.441
157	"Episode 7"	16 March 2022	0.387
158	"Episode 8"	23 March 2022	0.396
159	"Episode 9"	30 March 2022	0.418
160	"Episode 10"	6 April 2022	0.510
161	"Episode 11"	13 April 2022	0.473
162	"Episode 12"	20 April 2022	0.401

=== Series 15 (2022) ===
No. in series	Title	Original release date	AUS viewers (millions)
163	"Episode 1"	20 July 2022	0.487
164	"Episode 2"	27 July 2022	0.489
165	"Episode 3"	3 August 2022	0.453
166	"Episode 4"	10 August 2022	0.412
167	"Episode 5"	17 August 2022	0.508
168	"Episode 6"	24 August 2022	0.475
169	"Episode 7"	31 August 2022	0.481
170	"Episode 8"	7 September 2022	0.460
171	"Episode 9"	14 September 2022	0.497
172	"Episode 10: Very Final Episode"	21 September 2022	0.446

== Awards ==
Year	Nominee / work	Award	Result
2013	Peter Beck	AACTA Award for Best Television Comedy Series	Nominated
2013	Shaun Micallef's Mad as Hell	Logie Award for Most Outstanding Light Entertainment Program	Nominated
2014	Shaun Micallef	AACTA Award for Best Performance in a Television Comedy	Won
2014	Shaun Micallef and Peter Beck	AACTA Award for Best Television Comedy or Light Entertainment Series	Nominated
2016	Shaun Micallef's Mad as Hell	Logie Award for Most Outstanding Comedy Program	Won
2017	Shaun Micallef's Mad as Hell	Logie Award for Most Outstanding Comedy Program	Nominated
2018	Shaun Micallef's Mad as Hell	Logie Award for Most Popular Comedy Program	Nominated
2019	Shaun Micallef's Mad as Hell	Logie Award for Most Popular Comedy Program	Nominated
2020	Shaun Micallef's Mad as Hell	AACTA Award for Best Comedy Entertainment Program	Won

== See also ==
- Newstopia
