= BlackJack (film series) =

- DVD cover
- Genre: Police drama
- Created by: Gary McCaffrie; Shaun Micallef
- Written by: Gary McCaffrie; Shaun Micallef; Kristen Dunphy; Katherine Thompson; Tim Pye
- Directed by: Peter Andrikidis; Ian Watson; Kate Woods
- Starring: Colin Friels; Marta Dusseldorp; David Field; Doris Younane; Gigi Edgley
- Composer: David Hirschfelder
- Country of origin: Australia
- Original language: English
- No. of episodes: 7

Production
- Executive producers: Nick Murray; Sue Masters
- Cinematography: Henry Pierce; Martin McGrath
- Running time: 90 minutes
- Production company: Jigsaw Entertainment

Original release
- Network: Network Ten
- Release: 16 March 2003 – 2 December 2007

BlackJack is a series of Australian television movies created by Shaun Micallef and Gary McCaffrie, and starring Colin Friels. The movies began airing on Network Ten in 2003 and concluded in 2007. They were shown in the United Kingdom on the BBC and UKTV Drama.

After testifying against his former colleagues in a corruption trial Sydney detective Jack Kempson (Friels) is reassigned to a unit charged with entering the details of old cases into a police database. He unofficially begins to investigate unsolved crimes dating back many years.

== Episodes ==
=== Pilot ===
- BlackJack: Murder Archive (2003) – Jack turns whistle blower, resulting in the department demoting him to data entry duties, using a crime tracking system. This gives Jack the opportunity to work at solving old crimes. He is motivated by the case of a boy kidnapped and never found 30 years ago, as well as the memory of the loss of his wife.

=== First trilogy ===
- BlackJack: Sweet Science (2004) — Jack discovers that the sons (Alex O'Loughlin and Anthony Hayes) of a criminal gunned down during a football game in 1992 are now following in their dead father's footsteps.
- BlackJack: In The Money (2005) – A man whose wife was brutally murdered years earlier, survives what appears to be an attempt on his life. Jack investigates whether the two events are connected and if the wrong person was convicted of the initial crime.
- BlackJack: Ace Point Game (2005) – Two sisters kidnap the man they believe sexually assaulted them years earlier, with hopes of exacting revenge. As police pursue them, Jack re-examines the old evidence to determine if the man they're holding captive is indeed the perpetrator.

=== Second trilogy ===
- BlackJack: Dead Memory (2006) – After her car breaks down, a missing woman's body is found in a national park. Mysteriously, the crime mirrors that of the disappearance of another girl, who was known to Jack's offsider Sam.
- BlackJack: At the Gates (2006) – After their baby was tragically killed during a home invasion, a couple are motivated to build a community church. With the crime still unsolved ten years later, Jack investigates and discovers not all is what it seems.
- BlackJack: Ghosts (2007) - A young mother was shot and killed during an apparent kidnapping, and twenty years on, the perpetrator is about to be paroled. Jack investigates whether justice was truly served.

== Cast ==
=== Main ===
- Colin Friels as Jack Kempson
- Kate Beahan as Julie Egan
- David Field as Inspector Terry Kavanagh
- Marta Dusseldorp as Sam Lawson
- Gigi Edgley as Liz Kempson
- Doris Younane as Christine Vallas
- Sophie Lee as Denise Kennedy
- Todd Lasance as Stephen Hulce

=== BlackJack: Murder Archive (2003) ===
- Inge Hornstra as Carmen
- John Brumpton as Andy Margate
- Victoria Longley as Therese Ricci
- Russell Dykstra as Buchanan
- Tony Barry as Joe Bueneroti
- Matt Boesenberg as Shapiro
- Tina Bursill as Carmen
- Jason Clarke as Tony Seaton
- Ron Graham as Brian Kirsten
- Melissa Jaffer as Helen Kirsten
- Kate Beahan as Julie Egan

=== BlackJack: Sweet Science (2004) ===
- Alex O'Loughlin as Luke Anderson
- Anthony Hayes as Brad Anderson
- Vince Colosimo as Nick Delos
- Nina Landis as Stella Anderson
- Lara Cox as Claire
- Chris Haywood as Wayne Tippet
- Salvatore Coco as Mozz
- Steve Jacobs as Blake
- Tony Llewellyn-Jones as Neil Lawson
- Nash Edgerton as Bill

=== BlackJack: In the Money (2005) ===
- Max Cullen as Howard
- Bille Brown as Tez
- Paul Gleeson as Steve
- Damien Richardson as Garry
- Helen Thomson as Sandra Miller
- Grant Goldman as Celebrant
- Matt Holmes as Derek Chubb
- Elaine Lee as Astrologer

=== BlackJack: Ace Point Game (2005) ===
- Craig McLachlan as Michael Hasler
- Inge Hornstra as Kylie Margate
- John Brumpton as Andy Margate
- Daniela Farinacci as Jenny Hasler
- Russell Dykstra as Buchanan
- Sacha Horler as Angela
- Alice McConnell as Melanie
- Matt Holmes as Derek Chubb

=== BlackJack: Dead Memory (2006) ===
- Yvonne Strahovski as Belinda
- Erik Thomson as Rob
- Aaron Pedersen as Greg
- Garry McDonald as James
- Daniel MacPherson as Craig

=== BlackJack: At The Gates (2006) ===
- Rhondda Findleton as Jane Harrison
- Robert Mammone as Tom Lyndon
- Rebecca Rigg as Lisa Lyndon
- Libby Tanner as Stephanie Turner
- Bojana Novakovic as Nikki
- Terry Serio as Police Investigator
- Tasma Walton as Sylvia

=== BlackJack: Ghosts (2007) ===
- Rhys Muldoon as Dave Halfpenny
- Tom Long as Mike
- Marcus Graham as Harry Seale
- Russell Dykstra as Buchanan
- Simon Lyndon as Johnny Vale
- Shaun Micallef as Ian
- Tony Llewellyn-Jones as Neil Lawson
- Paul Goddard as Charles Hulce
