= Shaun Micallef's Stairway to Heaven =

2015–2017 Australian TV series

- Genre: Comedy
- Directed by: Russell Vines
- Starring: Shaun Micallef
- Country of origin: Australia
- Original language: English
- No. of seasons: 2
- No. of episodes: 4

Production
- Producers: Shaun Micallef; Russell Vines

Original release
- Network: SBS
- Release: 2015

Shaun Micallef's Stairway to Heaven is an Australian television factual series on SBS, starring comedian and writer Shaun Micallef.

== Episodes ==
The series first screened as a documentary in 2015 titled "Gods, Gurus and the Ganges". It returned on 18 January 2017 as a 3-part series with episodes titled "Mormons", "Spiritual Healing" and "Armageddon".
