= Francis Greenslade =

Australian actor (born 1962)

- Born: 3 October 1962 (age 64); Honiara, Solomon Islands
- Education: University of Adelaide
- Occupation: Actor
- Years active: 1991–present
- Francis Greenslade's voice recorded October 2013

Francis Greenslade (born 3 October 1962) is an Australian actor and acting teacher.

== Early life ==
Greenslade was born in Honiara, Solomon Islands to Australian parents. In the 1980s, Greenslade studied at the University of Adelaide where he first met Shaun Micallef. They performed together in the university's Footlights Club. Greenslade was the president of the South Australian Debating Association (SADA) in 1992 and represented the University of Adelaide at the World Universities Debating Championship where he was the Best Speaker in 1988.

== Career ==
Greenslade has performed with Micallef in many television shows including The Micallef Program, Welcher & Welcher, Micallef Tonight and Shaun Micallef's Mad as Hell. They both also appeared in Full Frontal.

Greenslade has also appeared on Pig's Breakfast, SeaChange, Blue Heelers, Water Rats, The Games and Marshall Law as well as in the 2003 Australian feature film Take Away (with Stephen Curry). He stars as Brian Gross in the Seven Network show Winners & Losers alongside Denise Scott who plays his on-screen wife Trish.

Greenslade has appeared in numerous productions for the Malthouse Theatre, the Melbourne Theatre Company, Playbox Theatre, State Theatre Company of South Australia and the Magpie Theatre Company.

Greenslade teaches acting including drama at The National Theatre Drama School and at the Film & Television Studio International

In 2015, Greenslade appeared in The Ex-PM, he then made an appearance in the Channel 9 television film Schapelle after Schapelle Corby's high profile legal case, where he played Alexander Downer.

In 2022, Greenslade appeared in the Netflix series Irreverent playing Ron.

Greenslade's book, How I Learnt to Act, (On the way to not going to Drama School), was published by Currency Press in 2019. It is a combination of memoir and acting handbook. His play, The Platypus, was produced at Theatreworks in 2024. It subsequently had a season at the Adelaide Fringe in 2025 and was programmed in the Brisbane Festival in the same year. The script was published by Playbill in 2026.

== Community work ==
Greenslade was a guest host at The Impossible Orchestra: 24 Hour Concert where Australia and New Zealand musicians played a world-first 24-hour symphony concert to raise awareness of the Care Aware campaign.

== Personal life ==
Greenslade and his wife, Louise, have three children. He plays a range of musical instruments; the clarinet, keyboard, accordion, guitar, ukulele and recorder. He is also a debater and has won various awards.

Despite sharing a surname, he is not related to his Shaun Micallef's Mad as Hell co-star Tosh Greenslade.

== Filmography ==
=== Film ===
Year	Title	Role	Notes
2003	Take Away	Innkeeper	
2012	10 Terrorists	Alan Dean	
2017	Lazy Bones	Jack	
2020	Out of Order	Shaun	
2021	Piñata	The Man	
TBA	Yesterday Island	Dusty	Post-production

=== Television ===
Year	Title	Role	Notes
1991	The River Kings	Pastor Patterson	Episode #1.4
1991	Pals	Boat driver	Episode #1.7
1992	The New Adventures of Black Beauty	Policeman	Episode: "The Fugitive"
1992	Ultraman: Towards the Future		Episode: "Tourists from the Stars"
1994	The Damnation of Harvey McHugh	Colin	Episode: "Paint Your Bandwagon"
1995	Full Frontal	Various characters	26 episodes
1995	Janus	Lange	Episode: "Suicide by Cop"
1995–2003	Blue Heelers	Various characters	5 episodes
1996	Shaun Micallef's World Around Him	Todd Nugent	Television film
1996	Mercury	Flustered Bloke	Episode: "Every Picture Tells a Story"
1998	The Games	Emmanuel Murdoch	Episode: "A Conflict of Interest"
1998–2000	SeaChange	Simmo	9 episodes
1998–2001	The Micallef P(r)ogram(me)	Various characters	23 episodes
1999	Water Rats	Ken Martin	Episode: "A Woman of Substance"
1999–2000	Pig's Breakfast	Martin Green	TV series
2000	Introducing Gary Petty	Edwin	6 episodes
2002	Marshall Law	Gavin Duffy	4 episodes
2003	Welcher & Welcher	Paul / Claude	8 episodes
2004	Fergus McPhail	Eric Sponge	Episode: "The Best Man for the Job"
2006	Real Stories	Samuel Sutherland	Episode #1.8
2007	All Saints	Eddie Comfort	Episode: "Lost & Found"
2007	Bastard Boys	Bill Kelly	TV miniseries
2007–2008	Newstopia	Various characters	6 episodes
2007, 2010	City Homicide	Greg Cosgrove / Patrick Franklin	2 episodes
2009	Shaun Micallef's New Year's Rave	Various	TV special
2009	The Librarians	MC	Episode: "My Rock"
2009	East of Everything		Episode: "Secrets and Lies"
2010	Bed of Roses	Ray Mumprhrey	Episode: "Mind the Gap"
2010	Offspring	Bad Doctor	Episode: "Re-Unravel"
2010	Sleuth 101	Mick	Episode: "Performance Enhancing Death"
2011	The Bazura Project	Cinema History Professor	Episode: "Violence"
2011–2016	Winners & Losers	Brian Gross	95 episodes
2012	Mrs Biggs	Tam O'Leary	Episode #1.5
2012–2022	Shaun Micallef's Mad as Hell	Various characters	172 episodes
2013	The Elegant Gentleman's Guide to Knife Fighting	Special Guest	Episode #1.3
2014	It's a Date	Guard	Episode: "Should You Date Outside Your Comfort Zone?"
2014	Schapelle	Alexander Downer	Television film
2015	Sammy J & Randy in Ricketts Lane	Judge	4 episodes
2015–2017	The Ex-PM	Curtis	12 episodes
2016	Soul Mates	Dr. Hackett	4 episodes
2016	The Doctor Blake Mysteries	Clayton Richardson	Episode: "A Difficult Lie"
2017	The Leftovers	Officer Gerard	2 episodes
2018	Jack Irish	Kyle Molan	Episode #2.5
2018	Terry La Rue's Homegrown Masterclass	Terry La Rue	TV series
2021	Metro Sexual	Bart Finley	Episode: "The Tribunal"
2022	Irreverent	Ron	10 episodes
2022	Hard Quiz	Himself	1 episode
2024	High Country	Dr. Patrick Haber	2 episodes

=== Narration ===
Greenslade is a narrator of audio books including:-

- Death Delight by Gabrielle Lord
- The Gizmo by Paul Jennings
- 48 Shades of Brown by Nick Earls
- The Art of War for Executives by Sun Tzu; Donald G. Krause
- The Book of Secrets by Tom Harper
- Lost temple by Tom Harper
- Bachelor kisses by Nick Earls
- Walter wants to be a werewolf! by Richard Harland
- Lethal factor by Gabrielle Lord
- HMAS Sydney by Tom Frame
- Backs to the Wall by G.D. Mitchell

=== Theatre ===
Melbourne Theatre Company

- The Madwoman of Chaillot
- Urinetown
- Things We Do for Love
- Man the Balloon
- Blabbermouth
- The Odd Couple
- Shakespeare in Love

Sydney Theatre Company

- Navigating

Playbox

- Chilling and killing my Annabel Lee
- Waking Eve
- Competitive Tenderness
- Babes in the Wood

Malthouse

- Optimism
- The Odyssey
- Tartuffe

State Theatre Company (SA)

- The Club
- School for Scandal
- Così
- The Tempest
- Accidental Death of an Anarchist
- Marat/Sade
- The Comedy of Errors

Magpie Theatre

- Funerals and Circuses
- Chutney
- Snap
- Prince of Knumbskulls
- Radio Dazef

Arena Theatre Company

- The Emperor's New Clothes

Red Shed

- Desert

Patch

- Evensong for Antarctica

The Marat Pack

- The Ages of Man
- Bishop Takes Knight
- As Time Goes By
- Not One But Two

Other

- The Boy from Oz (with The Production Company)
- 33 Variations (Comedy Theatre, Melbourne

== Honours ==
In 2017, Greenslade's portrait by artist/animator Phil Meatchem was a finalist in the Archibald Prize. The 153 x 117 cm portrait has him sitting on a couch dressed in a suit, looking out at the viewer, that Meatchem said was "inspired by the elegant Oscar-night celebrity portraits by photographer Mark Seliger."
