= John Walker (Australian actor) =

Australian actor and comedian (born 1963)

- Born: John Harold Walker; 1963 (age 62–63)
- Occupations: Actor, writer
- Years active: 1983−present
- Known for: Full Frontal; Blue Heelers; The Craic; Prisoner

John Harold Walker (born 1963) is an Australian actor who appeared in the sketch comedy show Full Frontal (1994–97) and its successor Totally Full Frontal (1998–99). His most notable characters in the series were sleazy news presenter Ian Goodings, and his impersonation of John Howard, the Prime Minister of Australia at the time. Walker also made appearances in the 1999 comedy film The Craic, the Australian drama Blue Heelers and the Australian comedy Pizza.

Walker later worked as a teacher in regional Australia.
