= Jimeoin (TV series) =

Australian TV series

- Starring: Jimeoin; Bob Franklin; Brian Nankervis; Glenn Robbins; Michael Veitch; Shaun Micallef; Dave O'Neil
- Country of origin: Australia
- Original language: English
- No. of seasons: 2
- No. of episodes: 25

Original release
- Network: Seven Network
- Release: 1994 – 1995

Jimeoin is an Australian comedy series starring Irish stand-up comedian and actor Jimeoin. The series ran for two seasons in 1994 and 1995 on the Seven Network.

The series also starred Bob Franklin and Brian Nankervis and featured a number of other comedians and actors including Glenn Robbins, Michael Veitch, Daina Reid, Sarah Woods, Penny Baron, Shaun Micallef, Dave O'Neil, Stayci Taylor, Tamara Cook, Rachel Griffiths, Brad Oakes, Angus Smallwood, and Wilhelmina Stracke.
