= Tosh Greenslade =

Australian actor

- Born: Tosh Greenslade
- Occupation: Actor
- Years active: 2012–2022

Tosh Greenslade is an Australian former actor, author and voice over artist known mainly for his work on Shaun Micallef's Mad as Hell.

While he studied at The National Theatre Drama School, Greenslade performed in a show directed by Francis Greenslade, to whom he is not related despite sharing a surname. Years later, during the pre-production of Mad as Hell, Francis remembered and recommended Tosh to Micallef. Greenslade auditioned for the show and was cast as a member of the core ensemble. It was his first television appearance. On Mad as Hell, he played a diverse range of characters, such as advertising guru Flornoy Quimbie and ranting idiophobe Caspar Jonquil.

He played the role of Marcus in Paper Giants: Magazine Wars (2013). In 2014, he appeared twice as a panelist on Dirty Laundry Live and was a guest on Live on Bowen. In 2015, as well as appearing in season 5 of Mad as Hell, he played the role of Phil in the movie, The Subjects. He authored the 2020 satirical novel The Scomo Diaries published by Penguin Random House.

Greenslade left the entertainment profession after Mad As Hell ended and became a copywriter working for Dentsu Creative.
