= The Eric Bana Show Live =

Australian television series

The Eric Bana Show Live is an Australian television comedy and talk show hosted by and named after Eric Bana.

The show began as four hour-long specials in 1996 called Eric. In 1997, the show settled into a weekly half-hour slot and was renamed The Eric Bana Show Live. It featured celebrity guests, music, comedy sketches and comedy monologues. Steven Blackburn was the band leader.

Bana began his career as a comedian in the sketch comedy series Full Frontal and brought many of his characters over to this show.

== See also ==
- List of Australian television series
