= Things We Do for Love (play) =

1997 play by Alan Ayckbourn

Things We Do For Love
- Original language: English
- Written by: Alan Ayckbourn
- Characters: Barbara; Nikki; Hamish; Gilbert
- Subject: Domestic Violence

Premiere
- Date: 29 April 1997
- Place: Stephen Joseph Theatre, Scarborough
- Official website

Things We Do For Love is a 1997 play by British playwright Alan Ayckbourn, premiered as the Stephen Joseph Theatre. It is about a woman who begins an affair with her best friend's fiancé, only for this new relationship to swiftly descend into violence. It was the first Ayckbourn play to be performed on the end-stage in the theatre's new end-space at its current site, and was performed with three floors in view: head-level of the basement, the whole of the ground floor and foot-level of the top floor.

== Critical reception ==
Reviewing the play in The New York Times in 2014, Anita Gates remarked "You might say that Things We Do for Love is not as acerbic as some of Mr. Ayckbourn’s other comedies, like The Norman Conquests and Bedroom Farce (play). He seems to have poured all of his sourness into one character."

In a review for CBC Television, Joff Schmidt expressed concern about how domestic violence was played for laughs in the piece, writing "there's no escaping the fact that we now live in an age when domestic violence — against women or against men, and we see both here — is simply no laughing matter. Channelling Punch and Judy, Ayckbourn seems to want to play a climactic lovers' brawl — which is simultaneously awkward and violent — for both shock and laughs."
