= Bad Eggs =

- Directed by: Tony Martin
- Written by: Tony Martin
- Produced by: Greg Sitch; Tony Martin
- Starring: Mick Molloy; Bob Franklin; Judith Lucy; Alan Brough; Bill Hunter; Marshall Napier; Nicholas Bell; Steven Vidler; Shaun Micallef; Robyn Nevin; Brett Swain; Pete Smith
- Music by: Dave Graney; Clare Moore
- Production company: Macquarie Film Corporation
- Distributed by: Village Roadshow Pictures
- Release date: 2003
- Running time: 98 minutes
- Country: Australia
- Language: English
- Budget: $4.5 million
- Box office: $2.3 million

Bad Eggs is a 2003 Australian comedy movie, written and directed by Tony Martin. It stars Mick Molloy, Bob Franklin and Judith Lucy, with Alan Brough, Bill Hunter, Marshall Napier, Nicholas Bell, Steven Vidler, Shaun Micallef, Robyn Nevin, Brett Swain, Denis Moore and Pete Smith having supporting roles.

Ben Kinnear (Molloy) and Mike Paddock (Franklin) are police officers working for the Zero Tolerance Unit, a special division of Victoria Police. When they accidentally shoot the corpse of a judge several times each, they are reprimanded but investigate his death, leading to several other accidents, for which they are relegated to uniform duty. Through Julie Bale (Lucy), a former police officer and Kinnear's ex, they uncover a conspiracy involving the Zero Tolerance Unit and extending all the way to the Premier of Victoria (Micallef).

Tony Martin's comedic style in the movie blends one-liners and slapstick with more sophisticated humour. The film marked Martin's directorial debut. Many of the cast and crew members, including Molloy, Hunter, Martin and Lucy, had previously worked on the film Crackerjack (2002).

The film performed moderately well at the Australian box-office and was also released in New Zealand and Germany. Molloy's acting was praised in some circles, as was the ARIA Award-nominated soundtrack by Dave Graney and Clare Moore.

== Cast ==
- Mick Molloy as Detective Ben Kinnear
- Bob Franklin as Detective Mike Paddock
- Bill Hunter as ZTU Commander Ted Pratt
- Judith Lucy as Julie Bale
- Alan Brough as Northey
- Shaun Micallef as State Premier Lionel Cray
- Marshall Napier as Doug Gillespie
- Nicholas Bell as Detective Wicks
- Steven Vidler as Detective Pendlebury
- Robyn Nevin as Eleanor Poulgrain
- Brett Swain as Security Officer Bartlett
- Denis Moore as Marcus Ridgeway
- Pete Smith as Darcy
- Gina Riley as TV Host
- Tony Martin as Gavin Clack
- Paula Arundell as Simone

== Plot ==
A magistrate named Poulgrain takes his own life in an exhaust fume-filled car but in his death-throes, he releases the handbrake whereupon his car rolls down the road all the way into the middle of a busy shopping centre where a pair of over-zealous detectives empty their firearms into his corpse. Disgraced, the two detectives, Ben Kinnear and his best mate Mike Paddock, both members of the much-hyped Zero Tolerance Unit (ZTU), are demoted back to uniform duties. Things get worse when they pay a visit to the Magistrate's widow Eleanor and accidentally burn her house down. Things become more complicated when Julie Bale, a journalist and a former police officer and one time partner of Kinnear's, is arrested on a charge of blackmailing the Magistrate. Kinnear starts to become suspicious when he discovers that a computer disc was found in the dead man's car but was tampered with by persons unknown. Kinnear's boss Gillespie questions the two detectives in charge of the Poulgrain case, Wicks and Pendlebury as to what happened to the original disc. Without warning, Wicks shoots dead Gillespie and Pendlebury and then deliberately wounds himself, re-arranging the crime scene to make it appear Pendlebury fired first.

Kinnear and Paddock are both suspended from duty by newly returned ZTU chief Ted Pratt. But with the assistance of IT-operator Northey, they break into the police data-base unit and copy the original file. But Pratt and Wicks confront them before they can leave the building and it turns out that the file has been altered, now implicating Kinnear in corrupt activities. Kinnear and Paddock narrowly escape an assassination attempt when the latter's house is blown up by explosives set by Wicks. The two detectives are captured by Wicks and his cronies and are then confronted by Pratt, now revealed to be the ringleader of the ZTU corruption. It is now clear that Julie Bale is innocent, having been used as a convenient scapegoat because of her journalistic enquiries into the corruption allegations. It is also revealed that Poulgrain was involved in the corruption ring but, having gotten cold feet, had threatened to go public so Pratt had blackmailed him into committing suicide. Rescued by Northey, Kinnear and Paddock pursue their last option, going to the Premier of Victoria Lionel Cray. However while waiting outside his office, Kinnear eavesdrops on a phone-call between Cray and Pratt, revealing that even the Premier is heavily involved in corruption. Having recorded the phone-call, they kidnap Cray and take him to a deserted road outside of Melbourne, offering to exchange him for Bale who has been abducted by Pratt.

In a tense stand-off, Pratt's plan to kill Kinnear, Paddock and Northey after getting the Premier back is foiled when, in a pre-arranged signal, Bale grabs a concealed gun attached to Cray and holds it to his head while Paddock aims an assault-rifle at Pratt and Wicks and their mini-van filled with heavily armed officers. Pratt surrenders and he and his cronies, along with Premier Cray, are all arrested for corruption. Kinnear and Paddock are re-instated and promoted and the former's old romance with Bale is re-ignited.

== Critical reception ==
The film received mixed reviews. Amy Gough, writing in the Echo News, praised the film, stating "Bad Eggs is a romp with enough plot and intrigue to keep you guessing if not laughing heartily. It has more pace and edge than Molloy's last film Crackerjack...as well as a great soundtrack". Scott Hamilton, for Pop-Planet, also liked the film, writing "It is very entertaining to watch Mick Molloy, Bob Franklin and Judith Lucy, who obviously have a well-rehearsed rapport with each other, work off each other".

Clint Morris, writing on filmthreat.com in 2003, wrote that "Martin...shows potential in his first stint as director. The script's reasonably tight, the characters well-defined and everything kept an enjoyable-enough pace....There's a slight lag in some of the gags-they're giggle-worthy but not ecstatically funny. But the ones that do work-work quite well, and mainly because of the highly under-rated Molloy – he's the glue holding most of the film together."

Sandra Hall, writing in the Sydney Morning Herald, wrote that Martin "started with a list of set-pieces and tailored the script to suit. Martin works as if he's still hooked on the urge to produce loud laughter at regular intervals...He bustles and the more he bustles-the slower things get". Hall also felt that the comic style of the cast and the pace of the film's action were mismatched.

David Stratton, writing in Variety, gave a lukewarm response to the film, saying "Bad Eggs is a crime-comedy with more crime than comedy. At its best, it's pretty funny... however there's no escaping the fact that the plot... isn't exactly original and the inclusion of scenes familiar from other movies... only adds to a feeling of deja-vu". Stratton praised the performances of most of the cast, but he felt that Hunter's role as Pratt was routine and Lucy's performance as Julie Bale showed that her brand of deadpan humour does not translate well to the big-screen.

Andrew L. Urban, for Yahoo, wrote "Encouraged by Crackerjack, perhaps I expected too much from Bad Eggs....There are a handful of good laughs.. but the tone shifts, and shifts again, as if the storyline had taken control of the writing process, elbowing out the sense of humour".

== Box office ==
Bad Eggs grossed $2,317,820 at the box office in Australia.
