= Smithereens (book) =

Book by Shaun Micallef

Smithereens is a 2004 book by the Australian author and comedian Shaun Micallef of essays, plays, poems and sketches.
