= Introducing Gary Petty =

Television comedy series

- Genre: Comedy
- Written by: Matt Cameron; Bob Franklin; Jeff Stilson; Kevin Carlin; Elise McCredie
- Directed by: Matt Cameron
- Starring: Bob Franklin
- Country of origin: Australia
- Original language: English
- No. of seasons: 1
- No. of episodes: 6

Production
- Executive producers: Steve Vizard; Paul Ridley; Elisa Tranter
- Producer: MaryAnne Carroll
- Running time: 30 minutes

Original release
- Network: The Comedy Channel
- Release: June 2000 – July 2000

Introducing Gary Petty is an Australian comedy series produced for The Comedy Channel in 2000. The series revolves around Bob Franklin as Gary Petty, a man who is obsessed with revenge on those he feels have snubbed him or have committed social injustices.

== Cast ==
- Bob Franklin as Gary Petty
- Elise McCredie as Virge Snell
- Francis Greenslade as Edwin
- Deidre Rubenstein as Nancy
- Aidan Fennessy as Jude Grey
- Saskia Post as Emily
- Brian Nankervis as Raymond J. Bartholomeuz
- Ben Knight as Ari

== Episodes ==
- The Bookie Who Did Me Wrong
- The Flight Attendant Who Did Me Wrong
- The Antique Dealer Who Did Me Wrong
- The Parrot Who Did Me Wrong
- The Girl From School Who Did Me Wrong
- The Cubby House Club Who Did Me Wrong

== See also ==
- List of Australian television series
