= Shaun Micallef =

Australian comedian (born 1962)

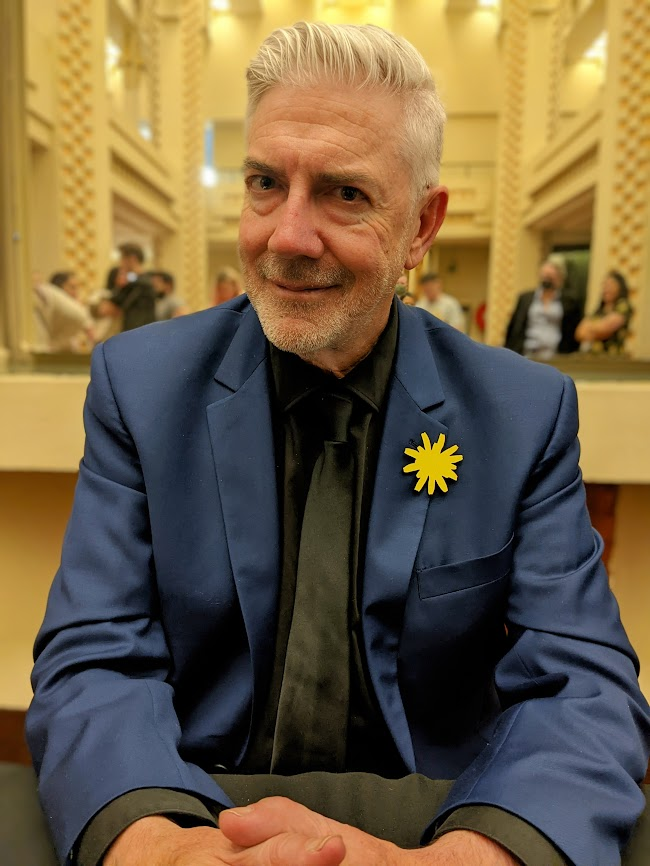
- Micallef at a book signing in 2022
- Born: Shaun Patrick Micallef; 18 July 1962 (age 64); Adelaide, South Australia, Australia
- Education: University of Adelaide
- Notable work: Shaun Micallef's Mad as Hell
- Spouse: Leandra (m. 1989)
- Children: 3

Comedy career
- Years active: 1987–present
- Medium: Television; radio; books; internet
- Genres: Sketch comedy; surrealism; dadaism; absurdism; political satire
- Subject: Humour

Shaun Patrick Micallef (/mɪˈkɑːləf/; born 18 July 1962) is an Australian comedian, actor, writer, television presenter and former lawyer. He was the host of the satirical news comedy series Shaun Micallef's Mad as Hell on the ABC. He also hosted the game show Talkin' 'Bout Your Generation.

Micallef first gained recognition as a cast member of the sketch comedy show Full Frontal, which led to his own sketch show, The Micallef P(r)ogram(me), the sitcom Welcher & Welcher and the variety show Micallef Tonight. He then hosted the satirical news comedy series Newstopia on SBS, the game show Talkin' 'Bout Your Generation (both the first Network Ten iteration and the Nine Network iteration) and Shaun Micallef's Mad as Hell on ABC TV. He also co-created and starred in Mr & Mrs Murder on Network Ten.

In addition to his television work, Micallef has appeared on stage, most notably in a revival of The Odd Couple (2016) for the Melbourne Theatre Company and on radio as the co-host of Melbourne station Vega 91.5's morning program. He is also the author of several books: Smithereens (2004), Preincarnate (2010), The President's Desk (2014), Tales from a Tall Forest (2017), The Uncollected Plays of Shaun Micallef (2018), Mad as Hell and Back (2019), Happily Ever Afterwards (2021) and Tripping Over Myself, a memoir (2022).

== Early life and education ==
Micallef was born in Adelaide, South Australia, and is of Maltese and Irish descent. His father worked for a company that sold parts for Volvos and his mother was employed at the Adelaide Bank.

As a child, Micallef lived in Clovelly Park and attended St Bernadette's School in St Marys, then St Joseph's Catholic School in Mitchell Park (now Sacred Heart College Middle School) before going to Sacred Heart Senior College where he was the college captain.

Micallef studied law at the University of Adelaide, where he was frequently involved in comedy revues, often involving Francis Greenslade and Gary McCaffrie, with whom he continues to work.

== Influences ==
Micallef was influenced by the Goons, Peter Sellers, the Marx Brothers, S. J. Perelman, James Thurber, Spike Milligan, Barry Humphries, Frank Muir, Monty Python and Woody Allen.

== Career ==
=== Early theatre ===
In 1972, having three younger sisters taking ballet classes, ten-year-old Micallef was often asked to help out when a dance routine required a boy. The following year he auditioned for the Bunyip Children's Theatre and over the next four years participated in plays that they performed in the Scott Theatre during school holidays. In 1976, he doubled for Humphrey B. Bear for personal appearances.

=== Law school theatre ===
During law school at Adelaide University and four years beyond, he appeared in Footlights Revues such as The Frogs, 39 Steps, Two Escalators and a Lift, Poodle Armageddon, As Time Goes By and Beckoning Gullett.

What got me through it was doing the revues. We did three a year and it was atrocious material, awful stuff looking back on it. We were idiots who didn't know anything. But it seeded the timing and being able to cope with shit material and get laughs out of awful things. — Shaun Micallef

=== Legal career ===
Micallef was a practising solicitor for ten years in the field of insurance law before making the decision to move to Melbourne and pursue a full-time career in comedy in 1993.

He relates the story that, while working as a solicitor, he talked so much about making a career change and becoming a comedian that his wife Leandra gave him an ultimatum: she marked a date on a calendar and told him to quit his job and become a comedian by that date or never talk about it again.

=== Television and film ===
Following early TV appearances on Theatre Sports (1987) and The Big Gig (1989), in early 1993, Micallef was offered a job writing for the Jimeoin show, which was soon followed by an offer to also write for the sketch comedy show Full Frontal where six months later he took on the role as co-producer with Gary McCaffrie. In 1994, Micallef became a full-time cast member of Full Frontal, where he became well known for characters such as Milo Kerrigan, Nobby Doldrums and a send-up of Italian male model Fabio. Micallef recalls that the show was a good introduction to television comedy because, with an ensemble cast, its success did not hinge on his performance and he had more freedom to make and learn from mistakes. However, he was frustrated with the lack of control he had over his work in the series as well as the repetition of characters and gags.

Micallef's role on Full Frontal led to the 1996 special Shaun Micallef's World Around Him and three seasons of the two-time Logie Awards-winning ABC series The Micallef Program (1998–2001), which he co-wrote and produced with long-time writing partner Gary McCaffrie. Since the series' end, he has created and starred in two short-lived television series, the sitcom Welcher & Welcher (2003) and the variety show Micallef Tonight (2003), and devised a series of telemovies, BlackJack (2003–2007).

Micallef has also had acting roles in the television series SeaChange (2000), Through My Eyes (2004) and Offspring (2010) as well as supporting roles in the films Bad Eggs (2003), The Honourable Wally Norman (2003), The Extra (2005), Aquamarine (2006) and The King (2007). In 2006, he was a recurring guest on the Network Ten improvisational theatre show Thank God You're Here.

In 2007, along with partners McCaffrie and Michael Ward, Micallef developed the satirical comedy program Newstopia, which he hosted. In 2009, Micallef joined Network 10 and hosted Talkin' 'Bout Your Generation which aired for four seasons.

He co-created Mr & Mrs Murder, a crime comedy television series for Network 10 which aired in 2013 and starred in the lead role of Charlie Buchanan alongside Kat Stewart. Also that year, Micallef signed to voice the artificially intelligent robot RE3F in the Australian feature length science fiction film Arrowhead (2014).

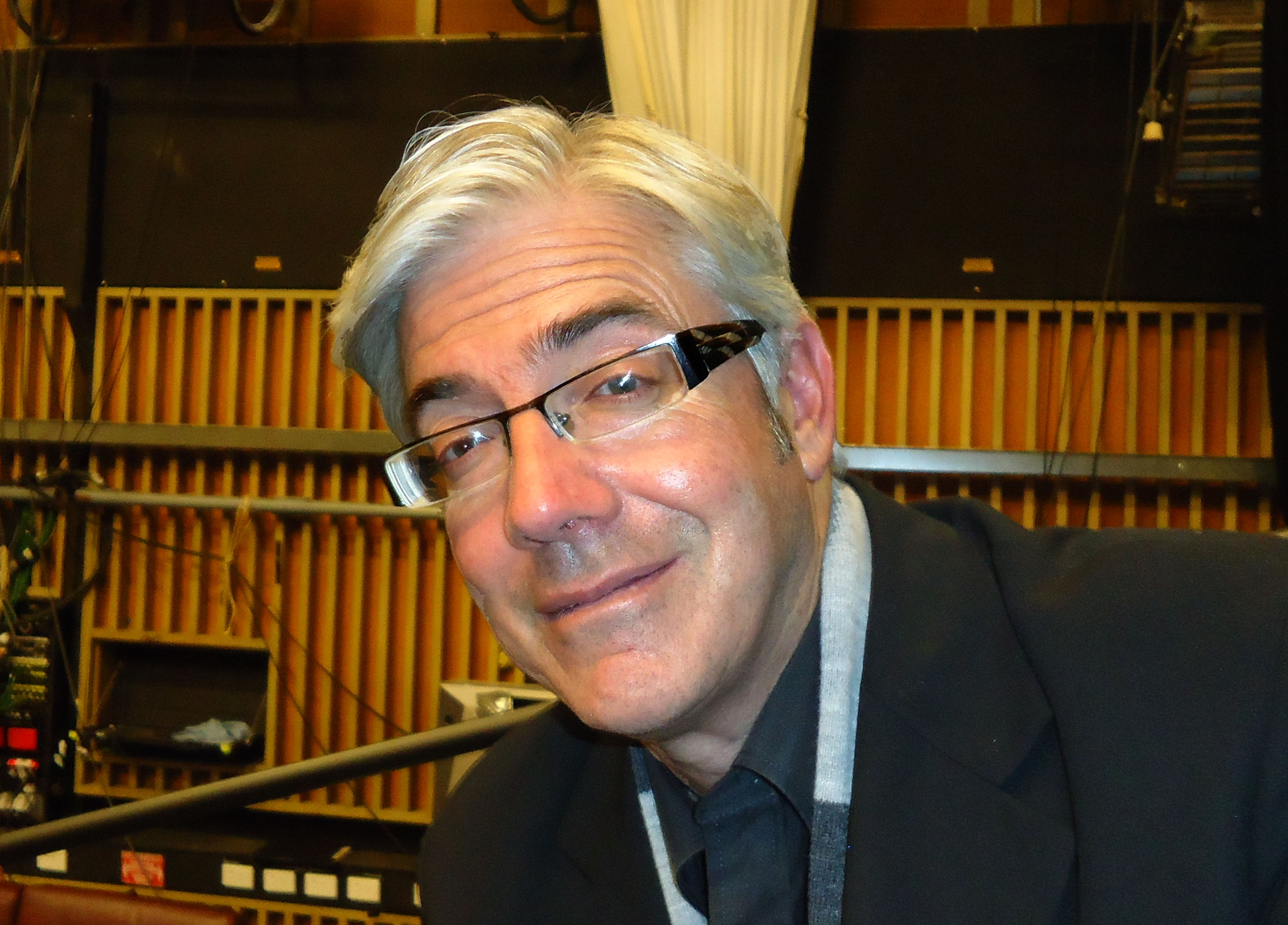
Micallef in the former ABC Studio 31 (2012)

Micallef hosted Shaun Micallef's Mad as Hell for 10 years and 15 series on the ABC from 2012 until 2022. Micallef also hosted a two-season reboot of Talkin' Bout Your Generation for Channel Nine (2018–2019) and the game show Shaun Micallef's Brain Eisteddfod which premiered on Network 10 on 20 July 2022, running for 10 weeks.

In 2022, he performed in a celebrity tribute to Australian comedian and actor Paul Hogan, Roast of Paul Hogan, which was broadcast on Australia's Seven Network.

In August 2024, Micallef hosted a series on ABC TV titled Shaun Micallef's Eve of Destruction. The show returned for a second series in August 2025. In the same year, he hosted a documentary series on SBS titled Shaun Micallef's Origin Odyssey.

In May 2026, Micallef hosted a 3-part documentary series on ABC TV titled Shaun Micallef's Going for Broke.

=== Other work ===
In September 2005, Micallef began hosting the breakfast show Shaun, Beverley and Denise on Melbourne radio station Vega 91.5 FM with comedian Denise Scott and television presenter Beverley O'Connor. In July 2006, comedian Dave O'Neil took over as host and the show was renamed Dave and Denise with Shaun Micallef. Micallef left the network on 23 November 2007.

Micallef released a book, Smithereens, which was published in 2004 and contains a collection of prose, poetry and plays. He describes it as a collection of "all sorts of bits and pieces I have written". His second book, a novella titled Preincarnate, was released in 2010.

In October 2014, Micallef released his third book, The President's Desk: An Alt-History of the United States, a semi-fictitious history told from the perspective of the Resolute desk.

Shaun published an autobiography in 2022, Tripping Over Myself, A Memoir of a Life in Comedy.

== Personal life ==
Born to teetotaling parents, Micallef began drinking alcohol at age 18 and became a teetotaller in 1986, although he did consume alcoholic beverages for a scientific test featured on Shaun Micallef's On the Sauce. As of 2003, he lived in Williamstown, Victoria, with his wife Leandra. The couple married in 1989 and have three sons.

== List of works ==
=== Films ===
- The 13th House (2003) – Sir
- The Honourable Wally Norman (2003) – Ken Oats
- Bad Eggs (2003) – Premier Cray
- The Extra (2005) – Paul Ridley
- Aquamarine (2006) – Storm Banks
- The King (2007) – Colin Bednall
- The Cup (2011) – Lee Freedman
- Sucker (2015) – Harry
- Arrowhead (2015) – RE3F (voice)

=== Television ===
- The Big Gig (1989) (writer)
- Jimeoin (1994) – various (also writer)
- Full Frontal (1994–1997) – various (also writer and producer)
- The Glynn Nicholas Show (1996) (writer)
- Shaun Micallef's World Around Him (1996) – various (also writer and producer)
- The Micallef Program (1998–2001) – various (also writer and producer)
- SeaChange (2000) – Warwick Munro
- Welcher & Welcher (2003) – Quentin Welcher (also writer and producer)
- Micallef Tonight (2003) – himself (also writer)
- BlackJack (2003–2007) (writer)
- Through My Eyes (2005) – Jack Winneke
- Thank God You're Here (2006–2007) – various (semi-regular guest)
- Dogstar (2007) – narrator
- Newstopia (2007–2008) – himself
- Talkin' 'Bout Your Generation (2009–2012, 2018–2019) – host
- Melbourne International Comedy Festival (2009) – host
- Offspring (2010) – Lachlan
- Laid (2011–2012) – G-Bomb
- The Bazura Project's Guide To Sinema (2011) – MK-Ultra (voice)
- Mollusks (2011) – Easty (voice)
- Shaun Micallef's Mad as Hell (2012–2022) – host
- Mr & Mrs Murder (2013) – Charlie Buchanan
- Danger 5 (2012, 2014) – Principal
- Shaun Micallef's Stairway to Heaven (2014) – himself
- The Ex-PM (2015–2017) – Andrew Dugdale
- Shaun Micallef's On The Sauce (2020) – himself
- Shaun Micallef's Brain Eisteddfod (2022) – himself
- Aunty Donna's Coffee Cafe (2023) – himself
- Time Bandits (TV series) (2024) – Town Mayor
- Shaun Micallef's Eve Of Destruction (2024) – himself
- Shaun Micallef's Origin Odyssey (2024) – himself
- Shaun Micallef's Going for Broke (2026) – himself
- Shaun Micallef's Parents' Evening (2026) – himself

=== Theatre ===
- Boeing Boeing (2008) – Bernard
- Good Evening – Sketches from Dudley Moore and Peter Cook (2010) – various
- The Odd Couple (2016) – Felix Ungar
- Uncle Vanya as Professor Serebryakov, Melbourne Theatre Company (2026)

=== Radio shows ===
- Dave and Denise with Shaun Micallef on Vega 91.5 FM (2005–2007)
- The Comedy Crystal Set – Adelaide University Radio, co-host

=== Books ===
- Bedtime Stories with Pate Biscuit and Bongo, co-written with Glynn Nicholas (1990)
- Smithereens (2004)
- Preincarnate (2010)
- The President's Desk (2014)
- Tales from a Tall Forest (2017)
- The Uncollected Plays of Shaun Micallef (2018)
- Mad as Hell and Back: Silver Jubilee of Sketches, co-written with Gary McCaffrie (2019)
- Happily Ever Afterwards: A Tale From a Taller Forest (2021)
- Tripping Over Myself (2022)
- Slivers, Shards and Skerricks (2024)
- Too Scared to Sleep! A Tale of Two Snails (2024)
- De'Ath Takes a Holiday (2026)
- Matthew Flinders (2026)

=== DVD and audio ===
- The Micallef P(r)ogram(me) s.2 (2004, DVD)
- The Micallef P(r)ogram(me) s.3 (2005, DVD)
- The Micallef P(r)ogram(me) s.1 (2006, DVD)
- The Expurgated Micallef Tonight: The Very Best of Shaun Micallef's Short-Lived but Brilliant Tonight Show (2008, DVD)
- His Generation (2009, CD)
- Micallef in a Box (2010, 4DVD/1CD) – collection of the above

== Awards ==
=== ARIA Music Awards ===
The ARIA Music Awards are a set of annual ceremonies presented by Australian Recording Industry Association (ARIA), which recognise excellence, innovation, and achievement across all genres of the music of Australia. They commenced in 1987.

Year	Nominee / work	Award	Result	Ref.
2008	The Expurgated Micallef Tonight	Best Comedy Release	Won	

=== AACTA Awards ===
- 2010: AACTA Award for Outstanding Achievement in Television Screencraft (Talkin' 'Bout Your Generation)
- 2013: AACTA Award for Best Comedy Series (Mad as Hell s.2)
- 2013: AACTA Award for Best Performance in a Television Comedy (Mad as Hell s.2)
- 2015: AACTA Award for Best Comedy Series (Mad as Hell s.3/4)
- 2016: Logie Award for Most Outstanding Comedy Program (Mad as Hell s.5)
- 2020: AACTA Award for Best Comedy Entertainment Program (Mad as Hell s.12)

=== GQ Men of the Year ===
- 2012: GQ Men of the Year Awards (Comedian of the Year)

=== Logie Awards ===
- 2000: Logie Awards: Most Outstanding Comedy Program for the Micallef P(r)ogram(me) s.2
- 2002: Logie Awards: Most Outstanding Comedy Program for the Micallef P(r)ogram(me) s.3
- 2010: Logie Awards: Most Popular Presenter (Won); Gold Logie (nominated) for Talkin' 'Bout Your Generation

Awards and achievements
Preceded by Andrew Denton	Host of the Logie Awards; 2001	Succeeded by Wendy Harmer
Preceded by Rove McManus	Logie Award; Most Popular TV Presenter; 2010 for Talkin' 'Bout Your Generation	Succeeded by Karl Stefanovic
