= The Micallef P(r)ogram(me) =

1998–2001 Australian TV series

- DVD cover of series 1
- Also known as: The Micallef Program; The Micallef Programme; The Micallef Pogram
- Genre: Satire
- Presented by: Shaun Micallef
- Country of origin: Australia
- Original language: English
- No. of series: 3

Production
- Running time: 30 minutes
- Production company: Artist Services (Note: Known as Red Heart during series 3)

Original release
- Network: ABC TV
- Release: 11 May 1998 – 9 April 2001

The Micallef P(r)ogram(me) is an Australian sketch comedy television series hosted by Shaun Micallef, and written by Micallef and Gary McCaffrie, that ran from 1998 to 2001 on ABC TV. It was known as The Micallef Program in its first series, The Micallef Programme in its second series and The Micallef Pogram in its third series. The Micallef P(r)ogram(me) is an umbrella title used for the DVD releases.

== Format and cast ==
Airing on Mondays (Friday for the second season) at 8pm, the show took the loose guise of a fictional variety show that featured mock interviews, host monologues, audience participation segments and competitions, bookending character-based sketches. The characters of Milo Kerrigan and David McGhan from Micallef's previous sketch series Full Frontal also reappeared in this series. The show was written and produced by Micallef and Gary McCaffrie: the small number of writers and small cast, as well as the different requirements of the ABC, meant that the show was far more surreal and abrupt than Full Frontal - the humour was frequently bizarre (notoriously evidenced by Attentione il est MYRON!, a recurring parody of European claymation programs).

As host, Micallef adopted the persona of an arrogant, thin-skinned, self-obsessed pedant. His monologues featured a large amount of deliberately confusing wordplay (garden-path sentences; for example, "As a Chinese person who is bilingual might say, 'gute Nacht!'"), and his interviews would revolve around him confusing and belittling his guests, both real and fictional: these included John Clarke, Tim Freedman of The Whitlams, Tim Rogers, and Andrew Denton. To balance this out, however, Micallef tended to play shabby and frequently crazy "low status" characters (such as Kerrigan) in the sketches, and was himself frequently humiliated by the other members of the cast."

As the program went on, it became stranger and more surreal. The third series was particularly notable for this, and gained much media coverage from a sketch that never made it to air. The sketch was supposed to show Shaun introducing a segment in which war hero Weary Dunlop would be shown as a transsexual and a few seconds into the sketch it would cut to the ABC switchboard lighting up with complaints. However, the sketch got complaints before it was even shown and subsequently never went to air - the irony of the situation lost on many of those who complained. Micallef made light of this by putting several sketches in his book Smithereens that ended with Dunlop entering in a dress. The sketch is however contained in the DVD release of the third series and appeared in the ABC TV retrospective series, Shock Horror Aunty.

Although the show made frequent use of minor celebrities, it shied away from direct parodies of television or actors, although the David E. McGhan character performed in stereotypical medical and legal dramas in the first two series. Its use of popular culture was better demonstrated in the opening show of the third series, where chanteuse Julie Anthony gave a strange rendition of Mi-Sex's 1979 hit "Computer Games" while a small dog pulled around a plastic cart with a single orange in it.

The show featured the talents of Wayne Hope, Roz Hammond, Francis Greenslade and, in the third series, Daina Reid. Micallef would go on to host a short-lived "real" variety show, Micallef Tonight, for the Nine Network in 2003.

== Name changes ==
The name of the show changed each series, due to audience complaints which Micallef turned into a running gag. The first series, entitled The Micallef Program, encountered complaints from ABC viewers who objected to the spelling of "program", despite the American "program" being the standard Australian spelling. This linguistic issue is particularly sensitive among viewers of the ABC, which broadcasts a relatively large amount of British content. In the second series, which began on 20 August 1999 and ended on 8 October 1999, the title was changed to the British spelling of The Micallef Programme, and Micallef "thanked" his viewers in the series premiere:

There's been a few changes since last series: we're spelling "programme" correctly this time – the French way with two m's and an e. That's entirely due to your feedback and we thank you for that. Certainly don't get that level of pedantry from viewers of commercial television.

In the third series Micallef continued this gag, mispronouncing program as 'PO-gram'. When the ABC literature advertising the show changed it to The Micallef Pogram, the closeness to the word pogrom made what Micallef called "a far darker joke than was ever intended".

== DVD releases ==
The second series was released on DVD in 2004, preceding the first and third series because the distributor, Shock Records, thought that the second series was most marketable. The third series was released in November 2005, and the first series was released in early 2006. A combined boxset of all three series called Micallef in a Box was released on 28 November 2006. Writing on the cover of the boxed set notes: "You own the award winning second and third series, now for the sake of completeness you can own all three".

In 2011, Shock Records released a box DVD set, The Collected Shaun Micallef, which included all three seasons of The Micallef Program along with The Incompleat Shaun Micallef, a compilation of his work on Full Frontal together with a Seven Network pilot Shaun Micallef's World Around Him, The Expurgated Micallef Tonight (highlights of Micallef's short-lived 2003 show Micallef Tonight on the Nine Network) and a bonus audio CD His Generation.

The Micallef P(r)ogram(me) Series Un
Set details
Special features
- 2 discs
- 7 episodes
- 30 minutes unreleased footage
- Audio commentary
Release dates

2006 (Australia)

The Micallef P(r)ogram(me) Series Deux
Set details
Special features
- 2 discs
- 8 episodes
- Additional sketches
- Audio commentary
Release dates

2004 (Australia)

The Micallef P(r)ogram(me) Series Trois
Set details
Special features
- 2 discs
- 8 episodes
- Deleted sketches
- Commentary
Release dates

November 2005 (Australia)

== See also ==
- List of Australian television series
