= Welcher & Welcher =

2003 Australian TV series

- Genre: Sitcom
- Created by: Shaun Micallef
- Written by: Shaun Micallef
- Directed by: Ted Emery
- Starring: Shaun Micallef; Robyn Butler; Francis Greenslade; Santo Cilauro; Anita Smith; Nina Liu
- Country of origin: Australia
- Original language: English
- No. of seasons: 1
- No. of episodes: 8

Production
- Executive producer: Geoff Portmann
- Producers: Nick Murray; Shaun Micallef
- Production company: Jigsaw Entertainment

Original release
- Network: ABC
- Release: 6 February – 27 March 2003

Welcher & Welcher was an Australian sitcom written by and starring Shaun Micallef which aired on the ABC in 2003. The show revolved around a husband and wife run law firm.

== Cast ==
=== Regulars ===
- Shaun Micallef as Quentin Charles Welcher (Lawyer and head of 'Welcher & Welcher' Law firm)
- Robyn Butler as Kate Welcher (Office Manager/Lawyer and wife of Quentin)
- Francis Greenslade as Peter-Paul Cohen (lawyer) / Claude Buzzo (client)
- Santo Cilauro as Griffin (bumbling IT Manager)
- Anita Smith as Jan (Quentin's Personal Assistant)
- Nina Liu as Tia (Receptionist)

=== Guests ===
- Alan Hopgood as Judge Furphy
- Andrew Curry as Article Clerk
- Brett Swain as Pastor Malcolm Crabbe
- John Clarke as Commissioning Editor
- Sigrid Thornton as a satirised version of herself
- Tom Budge as Jake Buzzo
- William McInnes as Sir Robert Jefferson

== Episodes ==
One series of the show was produced and was aired throughout early 2003 on the ABC.

| No. | Title | Directed by | Written by | Original release date |
|---|---|---|---|---|
| 1 | "Prejudice" | Ted Emery | Shaun Micallef | 6 February 2003 |
Quentin defends a controversial painting and the son of the most horrible man alive, Claude Buzzo. The articled clerk has locked herself in her office and the painters still haven't finished their three-week office makeover.
| 2 | "Adam's Rib" | Ted Emery | Shaun Micallef | 13 February 2003 |
Quentin wants to sack the new solicitor, Peter-Paul for being too nice, but instead ends up accepting an invitation to dinner. Kate and Quentin team up to help two of their friends divorce. As a result, Kate decides to spice up their own marriage with some fantasy role-play. In this episode, Kate breaks the fourth wall.
| 3 | "Favours" | Ted Emery | Shaun Micallef | 20 February 2003 |
Kate has a win in the industrial court defending a group of textile workers, who then offer to make her a dress for the Women-In-The-Law Dinner. Quentin does a favour for an old client of his father and learns once and for all that charity doesn't pay.
| 4 | "The Winslow Boy" | Ted Emery | Shaun Micallef | 27 February 2003 |
Kate and Quentin's son, Winslow, has been expelled from boarding school and Quentin decides to take his son's case to the school board. But returning to Broadshadows brings back the horrors of his own school experience. The DVD jacket lists episode 4 as "THE WINSLOW BOY", but the "Select Episode" on-screen menu lists it as "The Wilson Boy".
| 5 | "Hypothetically Speaking" | Ted Emery | Shaun Micallef | 6 March 2003 |
Kate and Quentin take a proposal for a televised Hypothetical to be hosted by Sir Robert Jefferson (William McInnes) to the ABC. At the meeting with the Commissioning Editor (John Clarke), Quentin is asked to be the legal advisor on the ABC's new drama series, The Gavel Bangs Heavily, starring Sigrid Thornton. As Kate collects Sir Robert from the airport, Quentin spends his first and last day on a television drama set. As for the restraining order, you'll have to watch to find out. Also in this episode is a bizarre little scene where Quentin has lunch in the ABC's canteen. His meal is a black leather boot. He rests his finger on the toe of the boot and then rests it above his top lip—leaving him with a black spot above his top lip. He then winds the bootlace onto his fork like spaghetti. This is obviously a recreation of a scene from Charlie Chaplin's 1925 film "The Gold Rush".
| 6 | "White Man's Burden" | Ted Emery | Gary McCaffrie | 13 March 2003 |
The drive team from a top-rating radio station meet with Peter-Paul for advice on defamation and Quentin makes a lasting impression on the pair when he is called into the meeting. Meantime, the painters bring a worker's compensation claim against the Welchers so Quentin decides to conduct his own covert investigation with the help of Peter-Paul and Tia.
| 7 | "Heat" | Ted Emery | Michael Ward & Shaun Micallef | 20 March 2003 |
As Kate has to pick up a Japanese investor from the airport, Quentin reluctantly agrees to meet with her clients from the RSPCA. However a city blackout means the air-conditioning is off, so he decides to close the office. As the lifts aren't working, Quentin leads the staff and clients into the fire escape only for the group to discover they're locked in the stairwell. While they battle their way up and down the stairwell, the building's power is switched on, which is when things really heat up.
| 8 | "Siblings In Law" | Ted Emery | Shaun Micallef | 27 March 2003 |
Mr Buzzo is charged with armed robbery and attempted murder and the Wignall and Carrick case is finally going to trial. Peter-Paul's wife goes into labour but it's Quentin who is left holding the baby, with the two cases being heard simultaneously and no other barrister to assist. And the painters conceive a diabolical plan to exact their revenge on Welcher and Welcher.

== Award nominations ==
In 2003, Welcher & Welcher received an AFI nomination for Francis Greenslade's performance as 'Best Actor in a Supporting or Guest Role in a Television Drama or Comedy'. Shaun Micallef also received a nomination from the Australian Comedy Awards for 'Outstanding Comic Performance on Australian TV' (although this also included his performance on 'Micallef Tonight').

== DVD release ==
The two-disc DVD set was released at the end of 2012 and contains all eight episodes plus "Never-before-seen outtakes". Aspect ratio is 16:9, audio is two-channel, region is ALL, format is PAL.
