= Full Frontal (Australian TV series) =

1993–1997 Australian TV series

- Also known as: Fast Forward Presents Full Frontal (1993 only)
- Genre: Comedy
- Created by: Steve Vizard
- Written by: Sarah Adams; Sean Dooley
- Country of origin: Australia
- Original language: English
- No. of seasons: 7
- No. of episodes: 144

Production
- Executive producers: Steve Vizard; Andrew Knight
- Production locations: Melbourne, Victoria, Australia
- Production company: Artist Services

Original release
- Network: Seven Network (1993–1997); Network Ten (1998–1999)
- Release: 13 May 1993 – 26 August 1999

Related
- Fast Forward; Totally Full Frontal

Full Frontal is an Australian sketch comedy series that ran on the Seven Network from 1993 to 1997. It launched the television careers of Eric Bana, Shaun Micallef, Kitty Flanagan, Julia Morris, Daina Reid and Denise Scott.

In 1998 a spin-off of the show moved to Network Ten under the name Totally Full Frontal, losing most of the original cast in the process; it finished in 1999.

Since 2008 till approx 2010, re-runs were screening on The Comedy Channel as part of the channel's "Aussie Gold" block of locally made, classic comedy programming.

== History ==
The series began screening shortly after the similar sketch comedy program Fast Forward (from which Full Frontal derived) ended. Full Frontal retained the same general format of Fast Forward. It was formatted in a way such as to create the effect of someone continuously channel surfing; after the punchline of each sketch, it would abruptly switch to the next as if the viewer had switched channels. However, the new show had an all-new regular cast. Initially, some members of the Fast Forward cast made guest appearances in occasional Full Frontal sketches, easing the transition into the new series. Several members of the new cast had appeared in the earlier The Comedy Company, including Kym Gyngell and Glenn Butcher.

The show first aired on the Seven Network on 13 May 1993, and finished on 15 September 1997.

== DVD releases ==
- Full Frontal - Series 1: Vol. 1 (2 Disc Set) - 23 May 2005
- Full Frontal - Series 1: Vol. 2 (2 Disc Set) - 20 June 2005
- Full Frontal - Series 2: Vol. 1 (2 Disc Set) - 25 October 2006
- Full Frontal - Series 2: Vol. 2 (3 Disc Set) - 5 December 2006
- Full Frontal - Series 3: Vol. 1 (3 Disc Set) - 20 February 2007
- Full Frontal - Series 3: Vol. 2 (3 Disc Set) - 20 February 2007
- Full Frontal - Series 1 (4 Disc Set) - 10 February 2010
- Full Frontal - Series 2 (5 Disc Set) - 10 February 2010
- Full Frontal - Series 3 (6 Disc Set) - 10 February 2010
- Full Frontal - Series 4 (6 Disc Set) - 1 June 2011
- Full Frontal - Series 5 (4 Disc Set) - 1 June 2011
- Totally Full Frontal - Series 1 (4 Disc Set) - 29 June 2011
- Totally Full Frontal - Best of Series 2 – 30 November 2011
- Totally Full Frontal - Series 2 (3 Disc Set) - 7 March 2012

== Series Cast ==
=== Seven Network ===
Years: 1993, Episodes 1-18; 1994, Episodes 19-40; 1995, Episodes 41-66; 1996, Episodes 67-92; 1997, Episodes 93-112.

- Matt Parkinson (1993)
- Matthew Quartermaine (1993)
- Greg Fleet (1993, Episodes 1–9)
- Michael Veitch (1993, Episodes 10–18)
- Jennifer Ward-Lealand (1993–94)
- Rima Te Wiata (1993–94)
- Eric Bana (1993–96)
- Glenn Butcher (1993–97)
- Kym Gyngell (1993–97)
- Ross Williams (1993–97)
- Denise Scott (1994)
- Sue Yardley (1994)
- John Walker (1994–97)
- Francis Greenslade (1995, Episodes 49–66)
- Julia Morris (1995–96)
- Kitty Flanagan (1995–96, Episodes 41–81)
- Daina Reid (1995–97)
- Shaun Micallef (1995–97, Episodes 41–105)
- Jackie Loeb (1996)
- Darren Gilshenan (1997)
- Gabby Millgate (1997)
- Ursula Brooks (1997, Episodes 93–99)

=== Network Ten ===
Years: 1998, Episodes 1-16; 1999, Episodes 17-32.

- Ross Williams (1998–99)
- John Walker (1998–99)
- Darren Gilshenan (1998–99)
- Gabby Millgate (1998–99)
- Julia Zemiro (1998–99)
- Paul McCarthy (1998–99)
- Vic Plume (1998–99, Episodes 7-32)

== Guest appearances ==
=== Seven Network ===
- Alan Pentland (1993)
- Gina Riley (1993)
- Glenn Robbins (1993)
- Jane Turner (1993)
- Jimeoin (1993)
- Magda Szubanski (1993)
- Sue Yardley (1993)
- Greg Fleet (1993 (Episode 10), 1994 (Episode 40))
- Jane Borghesi (1993, Episodes 10-18)
- Cherise Donovan (1993, 1994–1995, 1997)
- Geoff Brooks (1993, 1994)
- Marg Downey (1993, 1994)
- Michael Veitch (1993 (Episodes 1–6), 1994 (Episodes 36-40))
- Steve Blackburn (1993, 1994)
- Denise Scott (1993, 1995)
- Gabriel Gaté (1993 (Episode 13), 1995 (Episode 62))
- Peter Moon (1993, 1996)
- Steve Vizard (1993, 1996)
- Shaun Micallef (1994)
- Wayne Hope (1994)
- Jake Kirov (1994)
- Naomi Wright (1994)
- Ben Georgiou (1994)
- Michael Edward Stevens (1994)
- Daina Reid (1994, Episodes 39-40)
- Dieter Brummer (1994, Episode 40)
- Matthew Quartermaine (1994, Episode 40)
- Margaret Urlich (1994, Episodes 62 & 64)
- Geire Kami (1994-1995)
- Sandy Roberts (1994, 1996)
- Jeffrey Richards (1994)
- TISM (1995)
- Margaret Pomeranz (1995)
- Richard Hutson (1995)
- Wynne Pullman (1995)
- John Paul Young (1995)
- Pia Emery (1995)
- Julie "Fury" Saunders (1995)
- John "Vulcan" Seru (1995)
- Lisa Curry (1995)
- Tim Watson (1995)
- Kate Fischer (1995)
- Dave O'Neil (1995, 1996)
- Esme Melville (1995, 1996)
- Stan Yarramuna (1996, Episodes 67-68 & 71)
- Paula Gardner (1996)
- Kitty Flanagan (1996, Episode 82)
- Rosalind Hammond (1996)
- Paul Parker (1996)
- Ian Mall (1996)
- Rani Cameron (1996)
- Stephanie Lawrence (1996)
- Lisa McCune (1996)
- Tegan Stewart (1996)
- Lucinda Bruce (1996)
- Barry Crocker (1996)
- Caroline Reid (1997)
- Brett Tucker (1997, Episode 100)
- The Tap Dogs (1997, Episode 100)
- Eric Bana (1997, Episode 101)
- Ursula Brooks (1997, Episodes 101 & 105)
- Kate Gorman (1997)
- Daniel Daperis (1997)
- Kate Keltie (1997)
- Gerard McCulloch (1997, Episodes 103-112)

=== Network Ten ===
- Ryan Moloney (1998, Episode 1)
- Michael Carman (1998, Episode 1)
- Daina Reid (1998, Episode 1)
- Vic Plume (1998, Episodes 1-6)
- Gerard McCulloch (1998)
- Tania Lacy (1998, Episodes 2 & 4)
- Jarrod Choong (1998, Episode 7)
- Bill Charles (1998, Episode 7)
- Matylda Buczko (1998, Episode 9)
- Melanie Lockman (1998, Episode 10)
- Tim Chambers (1998, Episode 10)
- Fernanda Ramos (1998, Episodes 11 & 14)
- Robin Bissett (1998, Episode 12)
- Julie McKay (1998, Episode 13)
- Ron Kamoen (1998, Episode 14)
- Vanessa Sim (1998, Episode 14)
- Ryan White (1998, Episode 14)
- Michael Ward (1998, Episodes 13-15)
- Alicia Missen (1998, Episode 16)
- Bud Tingwell (1999)
- Carrie Baker (1999, Episode 26)
- Geoff Paine (1999, Episode 32)
- Kynan Barker (1999, Episode 32)
- Matt Tilley (1999, Episode 32)

== Notable characters ==
=== Full Frontal ===
Peter (or as he pronounces it "Poida" often correcting people by saying "hey it's Poida, not Poida");
An Australian bogan, played by Eric Bana. Poida was originally a TV host on Community Television's Channel 31. Peter enjoys to drink VB and carries an esky around wherever he goes. He has a blond mullet and dresses in a velvet suit. Most of the time he is seen smoking in sketches. Poida works for Channel 31 but is usually the stand-in host for many TV shows on other networks (such as Channel 9, 10, and the ABC) when the real host fails to appear. He has stood in for Ray Martin on A Current Affair and Kerry O'Brien on The 7.30 Report, as well as being the host of Storytime and an episode of Playschool. He takes an esky into the studio and smokes while interviewing guests. Instead of sitting on the set furniture, he prefers to make himself comfortable on a bean bag.

Impact on Eric Bana's Career
Poida was probably Eric Bana's most well known character and was thought to really have helped Bana's acting career. The director of the Australian film Chopper says he cast Bana because of his performance in Full Frontal. Bana has gone on to a successful acting career, starring in movies both in and out of Australia.

Eddie
Eastern European migrant, whose famous line was "It's a complete shemozzle" (also played by Eric Bana). In an interview in TV Week Bana said the character was born when he was around 10 or 12 whilst playing on his CB Radio.

"Eddie is the sort of guy who could walk through the Mardi Gras and not realise it was gay. He would just see it as coincidental that there were so many men there."

Ron
A stage janitor who wears overalls and is always trying to either apply for a job or scam money introducing himself as "uh, Ron". When he is caught out, he will often leave, saying "Fair enough". (Played by Ross Williams)
Neville and Beulah
Elderly nudists who love doing things "totally nude" (played by Glenn Butcher and Daina Reid).
Milo Kerrigan
Punch-drunk (but much loved) ex-boxer played by Shaun Micallef. He is considered to be the most popular character of the series. Heavily reliant on slapstick sketches involving Kerrigan routinely destroying large portions of the set. In series 4 he appeared on Parko's Good Sport, wreaking havoc across a multitude of sports and activities such as table tennis, ballet, billiards and blackjack. Micallef continued to play the character on his later series The Micallef Program.

Parko

One of the hosts of the sports variety show Good Sport, which often has Milo Kerrigan as a guest (played by Kitty Flanagan)

Roseanne Chapel

A TV personality, she took over as presenter of Good Sport from Parko. She also hosts a number of shows on high culture that feature Milo Kerrigan as guest (Played by Daina Reid)

Nobby Doldrums
An obsessed fan of 7.30 Report presenter Kerry O'Brien who is willing to be interviewed about anything, just to be on the program (played by Shaun Micallef).
David McGahan
Incompetent TV personality and failed actor who hosted nature documentaries, (played by Shaun Micallef).
Roger Explosion
'Alter ego' of David McGahan from his failed acting career (played by Shaun Micallef).
Leon
Art critic, renowned for his liberal use of the word "crap" (played by Kym Gyngell).
Ian Goodings
Sleazy TV news presenter on the fictitious Australian National Nightly Network News (played by John Walker).
Narelle Parkinsom
Bitchy and unenthusiastic co-presenter on fictitious Australian National Nightly Network News (played by Kitty Flanagan).
Phil Toinby
Much maligned weatherman on Australian Nightly Network News, renowned for his outrageous and colourful ties and using unusual pointers sent in by viewers, as noticed by the two newsreaders (played by Francis Greenslade).
Chaka
Hippie and poet, her poems usually circulate about her hometown of Nimbin (played by Kitty Flanagan). On a parody of A Current Affairs on Full Frontal, Eric Bana's Ray Martin asks Chaka what type of name is "Chaka" and what it means. Chaka is Arabic for "Joanne".
Enzo
Organized crime boss believed to be parody of figures in the Melbourne organized crime underworld (played by Ross Williams). He has a strict hatred of cameras and responds to questions with the word 'NO' frequently.
Allen Bamff
Appeared in three episodes as an unconfident Car Salesman promoting his self-titled car yard "Allen Bamff Holden" (played by Francis Greenslade).

The show also famously satirised many prominent celebrities, including:

Paul Keating
Australian Prime Minister 1991-1996 (played by Glenn Butcher)
John Howard
Australian Prime Minister 1996-2007 (played by John Walker). Earlier parodies of John Howard were also played by Glenn Butcher.
Pauline Hanson
Controversial right-wing politician (played by Daina Reid).
Mike Willesee
Journalist and presenter of Australia's A Current Affair known for long pauses at the most inopportune times mid-sentence (played by Eric Bana).
Stan Grant
Journalist and presenter of Real Life (played by Eric Bana).
Ray Martin
Journalist and presenter of Australia's A Current Affair (played by Eric Bana).
Fabio
Male model and "most beautiful man in the cosmos, including the black holes" (played by Shaun Micallef). Fabio was Micallef's favorite character on the show.
Stuart Littlemore
Barrister and journalist and presenter of Media Watch. (Played by Kim Gyngell).
Kerry O'Brien
Journalist and presenter of The 7.30 Report (see: Australian Broadcasting Corporation) (Played by Kim Gyngell).
John Burgess
Wheel of Fortune host from 1984 to 1996 (played by Ross Williams)
Tony Barber
Sale of the Century host from 1980 to 1991 and Wheel of Fortune host in 1996 (played by John Walker)
Glenn Ridge
Sale of the Century host from 1991 to 2001. Portrayed by Eric Bana.

=== Totally Full Frontal ===
Mister Camouflage
A man dressed heavily in military camouflage who has a hard time being noticed in day-to-day life (played by Darren Gilshenan)

Sophie
A French woman who works as a Passenger Check-In Officer for Air France. She used to work as a flight attendant for the airline, but was demoted after she got into a drunken fight with the French President. (Played by Julia Zemiro)

Noeline Buxworth

A bogan who was always seen at a poker machine and was always and smoking and drinking. She would often tell stories to strangers about her life. (Played by Paul McCarthy)

Famously satirized celebrities include:

Pauline Hanson

Played by Julia Zemiro in a 1950s style sitcom called I love Pauline

the cast of Seinfeld

Jerry Seinfeld (played by Paul McCarthy), Elaine Benes (played by Julia Zemiro), Cosmo Kramer (played by Darren Gilshenan), George Costanza (Played by Ross Williams)

Liz Hayes

Journalist and one of the hosts of the Show 60 Minutes (Played by Julia Zemiro)

Jana Wendt

A prominent journalist of the 90s (played by Julia Zemiro)

== Awards ==
Full Frontal has won several Logie Awards in its time. It has been nominated for several as well. It has won:

- Most Popular Comedy Program (1995, 1996, 1997, 1998)
- Most Popular Personality to Eric Bana

Nominated for:

- Most Popular Comedy Program (1999)

== See also ==
- List of Australian television series
