= AACTA Award for Best Children's Television Series =

Australian TV award

The Australian Film Institute Award for Best Children's Television Drama is awarded annually by the Australian Film Institute as part of the awards in television for excellence in children's drama. The award commenced in 1991 and in 2009 an additional category for Best Children's Television Animation was awarded.

== Best Children's Television Drama ==
Year	Winner	Episode	Recipient(s)	Network	Other nominees
1991	Round the Twist	"Wunderpants"	Antonia Barnard	Seven Network	
1992	Lift Off	"Something tells me"	Patricia Edgar		
1993	Round the Twist	"Little Squirt"	Patricia Edgar; Antonia Barnard	ABC TV	
1994	Sky Trackers	"Skating the dish"	Patricia Edgar; Margot McDonald		
1995	The Ferals	"Ratty Ratty Bang Bang"	Wendy Gray	ABC TV	
1996	Spellbinder	Episode #11	Noel Price	Nine Network	
1997	The Wayne Manifesto	"Amy Pastami Day"	Alan Hardy	ABC TV	
1998	Blabbermouth and Stickybeak		Ann Darrouzet	ABC TV	
1999	See How They Run	Episode #1	Josephine Ward		
2000	Eugenie Sandler P.I.	Episode #2	Margot McDonald	ABC TV	
2001	Cybergirl	Episode #1	Jonathan M. Shiff; Daniel Scharf	Network Ten	
2002	Short Cuts		Margot McDonald		
2003	Out There		Michael Bourchier		
2004	Wicked Science		Jonathan M. Shiff; Daniel Scharf		
2005	Holly's Heroes		Ann Darrouzet; Dave Gibson; Jenni Tosi		
2006	Mortified		Phillip Bowman; Bernadette O’Mahony		
2007	Lockie Leonard		Kylie du Fresne	Nine Network	
2008	Blue Water High	Series #3	Noel Price; Dennis Kiely	ABC TV	
2009	The Elephant Princess		Jonathan M. Shiff; Joanna Werner	Network Ten	
2010	My Place	Series 1	Penny Chapman	ABC3	Dance Academy - Joanna Werner (ABC TV); Dead Gorgeous - Ewan Burnett, Margot McDonald (ABC TV); Lockie Leonard - Kylie Du Fresne (Nine Network)
2011	My Place	Series 2	Penny Chapman	ABC3	A gURLs wURLd - Noel Price (Nine Network); Gasp! - Suzanne Ryan (Nine Network); H_{2}O: Just Add Water - Jonathan M. Shiff (Network Ten)
2012	The Adventures of Figaro Pho		Dan Fill, Frank Verheggen, David Webster	ABC3	Dance Academy - Joanna Werner (ABC3); Flea-Bitten! - Gillian Carr (Nine Network); Guess How Much I Love You - The Adventures of Little Nutbrown Hare - Suzanne Ryan, Seng Choon Meng, Sebastian Debertin, Tina Sicker (Disney Junior/ABC2)
2013	Nowhere Boys		Tony Ayres, Beth Frey	ABC3	Dance Academy - Joanna Werner (ABC3); Peleda - Luke Jurevicius, Nathan Jurevicius (ABC3); You're Skitting Me - Toni Malone, Damian Davis (ABC3)
2014	The Flamin' Thongs		Colin South and Keith Saggers	ABC3	Get Ace – Jack Christian and DJ McPherson (Eleven); Sam Fox: Extreme Adventures – Michael Bourchier, Suzanne Ryan, Cherrie Bottger, and Arne Lohmann (Eleven); Worst Year of My Life Again – Ross Allsop and Bernadette O'Mahony (ABC3)
2015	Ready for This		Darren Dale, Miranda Dear, and Joanna Werner	ABC3	Little Lunch – Robyn Butler and Wayne Hope (ABC3); The New Adventures of Figaro Pho – Daniel Fill, Frank Verheggen and Luke Jurevicius (ABC3); Nowhere Boys – Beth Frey (ABC3)
2016	Beat Bugs		Josh Wakely, Jennifer Twiner McCarron	7Two	Bottersnikes & Gumbles – Patrick Egerton (Seven Network); The Deep – Avrill Stark, Asaph Fink, Tom Taylor (7Two); Play School – Jan Stradling, Sophie Emtage, Sarah Dabro, Rebecca O'Brien (ABC 2)
2017	Little Lunch - The Specials		Robyn Butler and Wayne Hope	ABC Me	Mustangs FC – Amanda Higgs, Rachel Davis (ABC Me); Nowhere Boys - Two Moons Rising – Beth Frey, Tony Ayres, Michael McMahon (ABC Me); The Wild Adventures of Blinky Bill – Barbara Stephen, Alexia Gates-Foale, Tracy Lenon (7Two)
2018	The Bureau of Magical Things		Jonathan M. Shiff and Stuart Wood	Network Ten	Grace Beside Me – Lois Randall, Dena Curtis (NITV); Guess How Much I Love You – Suzanne Ryan (ABC Me); My Year 7 Life - Laura Waters, Emma Fitzsimmons, Karla Burt (ABC Me); The New Legends of Monkey – Rachel Gardner, Jamie Laurenson, Hakan Kousetta, Emile Sherman, Iain Canning, Robin Scholes (ABC Me)
2019	Bluey		Charlie Aspinwall, Daley Pearson, Sam Moor	ABC Kids	Drop Dead Weird – Sally Browning, Monica O'Brien, Kylie Mascord (Seven Network); Hardball – Catherine Nebauer, Joe Weatherstone, Bernadette O'Mahony, Jan Stradling (ABC Me); The InBESTigators – Robyn Butler, Wayne Hope (ABC Me); The Unlisted – Angie Fielder, Polly Staniford, Justine Flynn (ABC Me)
2020	Bluey		Charlie Aspinwall, Daley Pearson, Sam Moor	ABC Kids	Are You Tougher Than Your Ancestors? — Vanna Morosini, Stu Connolly, Donna Andrews (ABC); First Day — Julie Kalceff, Kirsty Stark, Kate Croser (ABC Me); The InBESTigators – Robyn Butler, Wayne Hope (ABC Me); Little J & Big Cuz – Tony Thorne, Ned Lander, Colin South, Alicia Rackett (NITV); Mustangs FC — Amanda Higgs, Rachel Davis, Debbie Lee (ABC Me)
2021	Bluey		Charlie Aspinwall, Daley Pearson, Sam Moor	ABC Kids	100% Wolf: Legend of the Moonstone — Barbara Stephen, Alexia Gates-Foale & Michael Bourchier (ABC); The Bureau of Magical Things — Jonathan M. Shiff & Stuart Wood (Network Ten); Dive Club – Steve Jaggi & Spencer McLaren (Network Ten); Hardball – Joe Weatherstone, Jan Stradling, Bernadette O'Mahony & Catherine Nebauer (ABC); Kangaroo Beach — Celine Goetz & Patrick Egerton (ABC)
2022	Bluey		Charlie Aspinwall, Daley Pearson, Sam Moor	ABC Kids	First Day — Kirsty Stark, Kate Butler (ABC); Little J & Big Cuz – Tony Thorne, Ned Lander, Colin South, Alicia Rackett (NITV); MaveriX – Rachel Clements, Trisha Morton-Thomas, Sam Meikle, Isaac Elliott (ABC); Rock Island Mysteries – Timothy Powell, Chris Oliver-Taylor, Warren Clarke (Network Ten); The PM's Daughter — Chris Oliver-Taylor, Tristram Baumber, Alice Willison, Kieran Hoyle (ABC)
2023	Bluey		Charlie Aspinwall, Daley Pearson, Sam Moor	ABC Kids	Barrumbi Kids — Monica O’Brien, Danielle Maclean, Julia Morris (NITV); Beep and Mort – Kaye Weeks (ABC); Crazy Fun Park – Joanna Werner (ABC); The PM's Daughter – Tim Powell, Kieran Hoyle, Warren Clarke, Yingna Lu (ABC); Turn Up The Volume — Philippa Campey, Amanda Higgs, Rachel Davis (ABC)
2024	Bluey		Charlie Aspinwall, Daley Pearson, Sam Moor	ABC Kids	Eddie's Lil Homies — Sophie Byrne, Mark O Toole, Anna Scullie, Eddie Betts (NITV); Hard Quiz Kids – Chris Walker, Kevin Whyte, Tom Gleeson, John Tabbagh (ABC); Little J & Big Cuz – Ned Lander (NITV); Play School: Big Ted’s Time Machine – Bryson Hall, Lyndal Mebberson (ABC); Spooky Files — Paul Watters, Andrea Denholm, Tony Ayres, Guy Edmonds, Matt Zeremes (ABC)
2025	Play School: All Together		Bryson Hall, Lyndal Mebberson	ABC Kids	Do Not Watch This Show — Andy Lee, Greg Sitch (NITV); Hard Quiz Kids – Chris Walker, Kevin Whyte, Tom Gleeson, John Tabbagh (ABC); Space Nova – Suzanne Ryan, Yasmin Jones (ABC)

== See also ==
- Australian Film Institute
- AFI Awards
- Australian Film Institute Television Awards
