= Heidi Arena =

Australian actress

Heidi Arena is an Australian actress who is best known for her roles as Dawn McConnichie in the comedy series The Librarians, Ms Gonsha in the children's television series Little Lunch, Joanna in the children’s television series Inbestigators and Audrey Gordon in Audrey's Kitchen.

Arena graduated from the National Institute of Dramatic Art in 2003 and has since had many roles in television and theatre. She has two children with her art director husband Mick.

== Career ==
Arena had a recurring role in the drama series Blue Heelers as Captain Marissa Craddock in 2003 and 2004 and a supporting role in the comedy drama series Last Man Standing in 2005. She played deputy head librarian Dawn in three seasons of the ABC series The Librarians.

Arena is a core cast member of the improvisational comedy Thank God You're Here In 2012 and 2013, she played the eponymous host of the satirical cooking show Audrey's Kitchen. The show, created by Working Dog Productions, stars Arena as Audrey Gordon, a fictional celebrity chef whose style is described as "Delia Smith meets Nigella Lawson". Arena had supporting roles on the children's series Nowhere Boys in 2013, The Worst Year Of My Life - Again! in 2014 and Little Lunch in 2015. On 24 February 2026, Arena was announced for the continuation series of Little Lunch titled Little Lunch: New Class.

Arena has appeared in stage productions such as Melbourne Theatre Company's productions of The Drowsy Chaperone, and The Other Place at The Playhouse and Optimism at Malthouse Theatre.

== Filmography ==
=== Television ===
Year	Title	Role	Notes	Ref
2027	Little Lunch: New Class	Mrs Gonsha	TBA	
2026	Dear Life	Sharon Natoli	2 episodes	
2024	Fisk	Lisa	1 episode (3.1)	
2024	Ruby Rai P.I	Denise	1 episode	
2023	The Disposables	Carina	Tik Tok Series	
2023	Gold Diggers	Sharon	1 episode	
2021-23	Love Me	Delphine	3 episodes	
2022	Shantaram	Lauren Marks	1 episode	
2021	Funeral of the Century	The Lord Mayor	2 episodes	
2021	Ms Fisher's Modern Murder Mysteries	Marjorie Mereweather	1 episode	
2019	Part Time Private Eyes	Val	2 episodes	
2019	The Inbestigators	Joanna	1 episode	
2019	Get Krack!n	Gayle	1 episode	
2018	The Housemate	Marg	3 episodes	
2018	Back In Very Small Business	Madeline	1 episodes	
2018	Jack Irish	Helen Dapcevich	2 episodes	
2017	The Doctor Blake Mysteries	Helen Murphy	1 episode	
2017	Shaun Micallef's Mad as Hell	Carson	1 episode	
2017	True Story with Hamish & Andy	Barbara	1 episode	
2015-16	Little Lunch	Mrs Gonsha	28 episodes	
2016	Upper Middle Bogan	Cassie	1 episode	
2013-16	Nowhere Boys	Kathy Ferne	11 episodes	
2014	It's a Date	Antoniette	1 episode	
2014	Worst Year Of My Life, Again!	Ms Albiston	1 episode	
2014	Fat Tony & Co.	Christine Nixon	4 episodes	
2012-13	Audrey's Kitchen	Audrey Gordon	20 episodes	
2012	Offspring (TV series)	Cathy	1 episode	
2012	Woodley	Extras Director	1 episode	
2007-10	The Librarians	Dawn McConnichie	20 episodes	
2010	Sleuth 101	Bea	1 episode	
2009	City Homicide	Jacqui	1 episode	
2006-09, 2023-	Thank God You're Here	Ensemble		
2007	Kick	Miki's Agent	1 episode	
2005	Last Man Standing	Charottle	9 episodes	
2003-04	Blue Heelers	Marissa Craddock	8 episodes	
2003	The Secret Life of Us	Sally	1 episode	

=== Film / Television Movies ===
Year	Title	Role	Notes
2016	Spirit of the Game	Mary Condle	
2016	Emo the Musical	Sister Kathleen	
2016	Nowhere Boys: The Book of Shadows	Kathy Ferne	
2015	Now Add Honey	Rhonda	
2012	Real Meal Deal		Short
2011	Spiderwalk	Mrs Thompson	Short
2010	Billy	Mum	Short
2010	Smoking Will Kill You	Sammy	Short
2006	Human Lie Detector	Restaurant Woman	Short
2005	Little Oberon	Claudia	
2003	Tuck and Cover	Nicole	Short
2003	The Mormon Conquest	Bronwyn	Short
