= Stories from the Golf =

Television series

Stories from the Golf is an Australian television comedy series first broadcast on SBS in 2004. The series was made up of 13 five-minute episodes. Stories from the Golf was written and produced by Wayne Hope and Robyn Butler.

== Cast ==
- Wayne Hope as Anton
- Robyn Butler as Candice
- Irene Korsten as Sandi
- Bob Franklin as Kyle
- Marco Chiappi as Cop
- Roz Hammond as Woman
- Monica Maughan as Irma
- Camilla Ah Kin
- Molly Daniels as Flower Girl
- Cliff Ellen as Ted
- Sue Jones as Lorraine

== See also ==
- The Librarians
- Very Small Business
