= Little lunch =

little lunch may refer to:

- Recess (break)
- Little Lunch (TV series), a 2015 Australian television series
