= Beejan Land =

Australian actor and playwright (born 1985)

- Born: 1985 (age 40–41); Sydney, Australia
- Occupations: Actor and Producer
- Website: Beejan Land IMDb

Beejan Land (Persian: بیجان لاند; born 1985 in Paddington, New South Wales, Australia) is an Australian actor and producer. He graduated from National Institute of Dramatic Art and Newtown High School of the Performing Arts

Beejan also trained at the L'École Internationale de Théâtre Jacques Lecoq. Beejan is also a graduate of ACTT's Talented Young Actors' Program, National Institute of Dramatic Art Acting and Playwrighting programs. He also trained at Australian Theatre for Young People.

== Early performing life ==
Beejan was born in Sydney Australia and is of Iranian/Persian origins. He started his performing career as a young magician. Performing at events and parties he quickly began to develop a name as a magician. In 1998 he was awarded first place Australian Convention of Magicians competition in the Walk on Walk off Section. He then began taking after school acting classes at the Australian Theatre for Young People in 1999. He took classes in Film, Theatre and Voice as well as master classes with other industry professionals. He performed in many productions with them giving him the experience and desire to continue his passions in the field of theatre and film. Guest teachers at Australian Theatre for Young People included Nick Enright, Victoria Longley, Kate Champion and David Berthold.

== Early career ==
Beejan's acting debut really came around when he set up ROAR Theatre Company in 2004. An independent theatre company with a drive to combine emerging artists with established professionals in order enhance and develop and Australian voice. A co-production with Darlinghurst Theatre saw him produce and act in a production of Vicious Streaks by Alex Broun he asked Mad Max Beyond Thunderdome director George Ogilvie to direct along with then emerging director Lee Lewis. The production also featured Peter Mochrie and Jacinta John.

== Career ==
Beejan was asked by the Melbourne Theatre Company to perform in their main-stage production of The History Boys written by Alan Bennett and directed by Peter Evans. The production played a sold out season at The Arts Centre. The production featured other Australian actors such as Matthew Newton, Ashley Zukerman and Ben Geurens.

Beejan has performed in stage plays by William Shakespeare, Michael Gow, David Hare, Bertold Brecht, Debra Oswald, Ned Manning, Cyril Tourneur, Thomas Middleton, Alfred Jarry, Alex Broun, Mark Ravenhill, Tommy Murphy, Nazım Hikmet Ran, Frank Marcus, Alan Bennett, Tony Kushner and José Rivera

In 2004 he co-starred in The Black Balloon director Elissa Down's Tropfest short film Summer Angst. He also guest starred in an episode of the Australian medical drama series All Saints (TV series)

In 2005 he toured to Northern Ireland performing in Debra Oswald's Skate at the Belfast Festival at Queens.

2008 saw Beejan join Wayne Hope, Kym Gyngell and the cast of Australian comedy series Very Small Business (TV series) as Taxation Officer, Lynton McGyver

After a forceful nudge by world-renowned Theatre director Ariane Mnouchkine Beejan decided to undertake further studies at L'École Internationale de Théâtre Jacques Lecoq at the same time as creating a new work with the Théâtre du Soleil. Beejan has since been with the company.

=== Filmography ===
Year	Film	Role	Notes
2015	Rock the Kasbah	Daoud Sididi (Support Lead)	Feature Film Dir: Barry Levinson
2014	Damn Foreigners	Massoud (Lead)	Feature Film
2014	NCIS: Los Angeles	Agent Farhad	TV series
2014	Mega Shark vs. Mecha Shark	Roy	Feature Film
2013	Les Naufragés du Fol Espoir (Aurores)	Monsieur Theodore	Feature film Dir: Ariane Mnouchkine
2013	The Last Goodbye	Henri	Feature Film Dir: Samantha Rebillet
2012	L'affaire Gordji	Ambassadeur	TV movie
2008	Very Small Business	Lynton McGyver	TV Comedy
2008	Close Distance	Ali	Short Film AFTRS
2004	All Saints	Tom Hudson	TV series
2004	Life Support	Timothy	TV series
2004	Summer Angst	Matthew	Short Film Tropfest Finalist Dir: Elissa Down
2007	Four Corners	Muhamed Haneef	TV Feature
2001	Contact	David	Short Film – NSW FTO

=== Theatre ===
Year	Play	Role	Company
2009 -2013	Les Naufrages du Fol Espoir	Company member	Théâtre du Soleil
2009	Vincent River	Davey	Tamarama Rock Surfers
2008	Terror on the Northside	Mike	Rag and Bone
2008	Angels in America	Prior Walter/Man in the Park	New Theatre (Newtown)
2008	References To Salvador Dalí Make Me Hot	Martin	Independent production
2007	The History Boys	Akthar	Melbourne Theatre Company
2007	Spring Awakening	Hanchen Rilow	Hayloft Project
2006	The Revengers Tragedy	Spurio/Junior	Shakespeare's Globe
2006	A Beautiful Life	Amir	New Theatre (Newtown)
2006	Gift of the Gun	Ben	George Ogilvie
2005	Skate by Debra Oswald	Mitchell	Belfast Festival at Queens
2004	Vicious Streaks	Ben/Matt	Darlinghurst Theatre
2004	Mr Puntila and his Man Matti	The Envoy	ATYP / Wharf Theatre
2004	Norma	Novice	Opera Australia dir: George Ogilvie
2004	Alice Dreaming	Pommy Cop/Baby/Mr Speaker	ATYP / Wharf Theatre
2004	OUT/SIDE/IN	Ensemble	ATYP / Wharf Theatre
2003	Skylight by David Hare	Edward Sergeant	New Theatre (Newtown)
2003	What the Umbrella did Next	The Shaving Man	Dir: Christopher Hurrell
2003	Skate by Debra Oswald	Mitchell	NSW and VIC regional tour
2002	Kinderspiel	Ensemble	Sydney Festival Sydney Opera House
2002	Taming of the Shrew	Lucentio	NIDA
2002	The Greeks	Priam/Protoculus	NIDA
2002	Inek: The Cow	The Child	SideTrack Theatre

== Awards and nominations ==
Year	Award	Category	Work	Result
1998	Australian Magic Champion	"Walk on Walk off under 30s"'	Magician	Won
1997	Australian Yo-Yo Champion	"Coca Cola Yo Yo Competition "'	Yo Yo	Won
