= Comedy Showroom =

Australian TV anthology series

Comedy Showroom is an Australian television comedy anthology series that began airing in May 2016 on ABC. The six new comedies screened in the series are seen as possible pilots for a full TV series.

Ronny Chieng: International Student won a full season which aired on the ABC in Australia in June 2017 and later on Comedy Central in the US. The Letdown won a full season for the ABC in Australia and on Netflix in the US.

== Episodes ==
=== Ronny Chieng: International Student ===
Ronny Chieng shares his experiences as an international student.

- Ronny Chieng as himself
- Molly Daniels as Asher
- Dave Eastgate as Mick
- Hoa Xuande as Elvin
- Anthony Morgan as Professor Dale
- Laurence Boxhall as Daniel
- Linda Schragger as Mrs. Chieng
- Gareth Yuen as Denedict
- Shuang Hu as Wei-Jun
- Felicity Ward as Post-Grad Student
- Tim Potter as Librarian
- Quin Ellery as Nicholas
- Brenton Cosier as James
- Daniel Di Giovanni as Alexander
- Aaron Gocs as Streaker
- John Campbell as Waiter
- Ryder Jack as Hipster

=== The Letdown ===
Audrey struggles as a new mum in an oddball mothers' group.

- Alison Bell as Audrey
- Duncan Fellows
- Noni Hazlehurst as Ambrose
- Sacha Horler as Ester
- Lucy Durack as Sophie
- Leon Ford as Ruben
- Celeste Barber as Barbara
- Taylor Ferguson as Jenna
- Leah Vandenberg as Martha
- Xana Tang
- Sarah Peirse

=== The Legend of Gavin Tanner ===
The desperate attempts of a deadbeat weed dealer to win his new neighbour's affections.

=== The Future is Expensive ===
Eddie Perfect's absurd suburban life.

=== Bleak ===
Kate McLennan plays Anna O'Brien a woman who hits rock bottom in life and love after losing her job, boyfriend and home in one day.

=== Moonman ===
Lawrence Mooney discovering what it takes for a 40-something-year-old man to finally grow up.
