= Ronny Chieng =

American comedian and actor (born 1986)

- 钱信伊
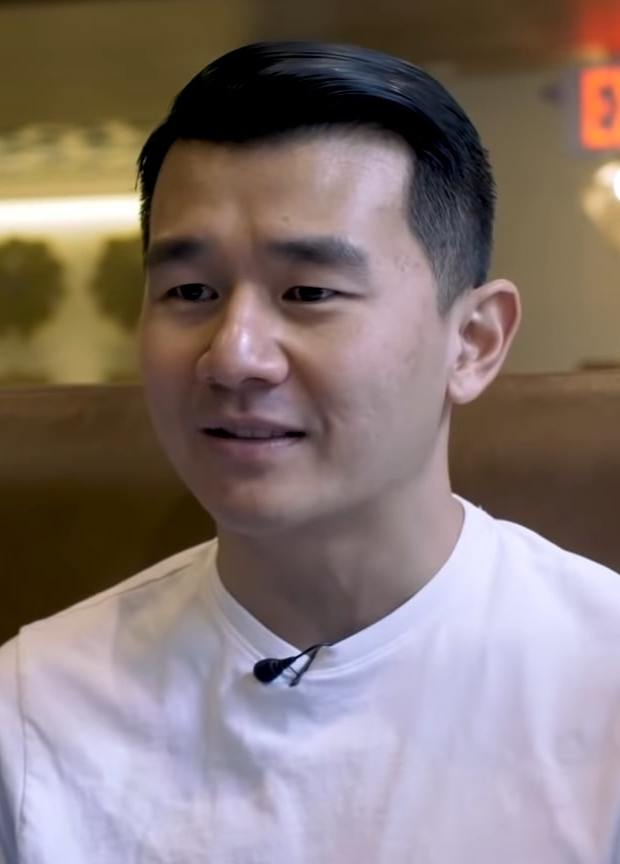
- Chieng in 2018
- Born: Xin Yi Chieng; 1986 (age 39–40) (Note: In his November 2024 appearance on Jimmy Kimmel Live!, Chieng discussed how rumors that his birthday is in November had been widely circulated on the Internet. He showed his legal ID to Jimmy Kimmel, who verified on air that Chieng was not born in November without revealing Chieng's actual birthdate.); Johor Bahru, Johor, Malaysia
- Citizenship: Malaysia (until 2025); United States (since 2025)
- Education: University of Melbourne (BCom, LLB); Australian National University (LPC)
- Occupations: Comedian; actor
- Years active: 2009–present
- Spouse: Hannah Pham (m. 2016)

Chinese name
- Simplified Chinese: 钱信伊
- Traditional Chinese: 錢信伊
Transcriptions
Standard Mandarin
- Hanyu Pinyin: Qián Xìnyī
Yue: Cantonese
- Jyutping: Cin4 Seon3 Ji1
Southern Min
- Hokkien POJ: Chîⁿ Sìn-i
- Website: ronnychieng.com

Ronny Xin Yi Chieng (Chinese: 钱信伊; pinyin: Qián Xìnyī; born 1986) is an American comedian and actor. He is a senior correspondent and rotating host on Comedy Central's The Daily Show, and he created and starred in the sitcom Ronny Chieng: International Student. He has also appeared in films such as Crazy Rich Asians and the English version of Inspector Sun and the Curse of the Black Widow.

Born in Johor, Malaysia, Chieng moved to the United States then back to Malaysia when he was eight years old. He spent the rest of his youth in Malaysia and in Singapore. He graduated from University of Melbourne in 2010 with a bachelor's degree in law and obtained a post-graduate diploma in legal practice from the Australian National University in Canberra, Australia. Since 2012, he has been active in the entertainment industry of Australia and the United States. In 2025, Chieng obtained American citizenship and renounced his Malaysian citizenship, as Malaysia does not recognize dual nationality.

== Early life and education ==
Chieng was born into a Malaysian Chinese family in Johor Bahru, Malaysia. He does not celebrate his birthday and prefers to keep his date of birth private. He grew up in both Singapore and the United States, living in Manchester, New Hampshire, from 1989 to 1994.

In his youth, Chieng was a Singapore Sea Scout of the Singapore Scout Association. When he lived in Johor Bahru, Chieng commuted to Fuchun Primary School in Woodlands, Singapore. He subsequently attended Pioneer Secondary School and Jurong Pioneer Junior College.

Thereafter, Chieng attended the University of Melbourne in Australia. He lived at Trinity College and graduated in 2010 with Bachelor of Commerce and Bachelor of Laws degrees. He also obtained a Graduate Diploma in Legal Practice from the Australian National University in 2012.

== Career ==
In 2012, Chieng, alongside Matt Okine, won best newcomer at the Melbourne International Comedy Festival for his show The Ron Way.

Chieng performed with Trevor Noah in 2013 at the Just for Laughs comedy festival in Montreal. In 2015, he was asked to audition for the correspondent role on The Daily Show, which Noah hosted from 2015 to 2022. In July 2016, he was named one of 10 Comics to Watch by Variety. Three months later, he had a segment on The Daily Show in which he criticized a Jesse Watters clip on Fox News deemed by many as racist. He also revisited New York City's Chinatown neighborhood, where Watters had mocked residents, and conducted more respectful interviews in Mandarin and Cantonese. The video went viral and received coverage in The Washington Post and on Slate.

In 2017, Chieng began co-writing and starring in the sitcom Ronny Chieng: International Student, based on his own experience as a Malaysian student in Australia. It was developed for Comedy Central in America and ABC TV in Australia. In 2018, he made his film debut in Crazy Rich Asians, as Eddie Cheng, an obnoxious banker.

In 2019, his first stand-up special with Netflix, Asian Comedian Destroys America!, was released, directed by his Daily Show collaborator Sebastian DiNatale. In early 2021, Chieng signed a deal with Netflix for two additional stand-up specials and a "docu-comedy." He also appeared as the original character Jon Jon in the Marvel Studios film Shang-Chi and the Legend of the Ten Rings; it was also announced that Chieng and DiNatale will co-write a martial arts action-comedy film for Sony.

The new "docu-comedy", titled Ronny Chieng Takes Chinatown, was released in 2022. The film co-stars YouTuber David Fung, with guest appearances from fellow Shang-Chi actor Simu Liu and professional NBA player Jeremy Lin. Chieng's second Netflix special, Speakeasy, was released on 5 April 2022.

In October 2022, Chieng commented on Rishi Sunak becoming Britain's first Asian Prime Minister during a Daily Show segment. He said, "I know everyone is excited that this is the first Asian prime minister, but let's be clear: Indians are not Asians, OK? They're still people—great people—just not Asian people." Many internet netizens have criticized the comment, particularly Indians.

In July 2024, Mayor of Honolulu, Rick Blangiardi signed a proclamation that 27 July, will be known as Ronny Chieng Day for his contributions to the entertainment industry, during Chieng's stay in Honolulu for his The Love to Hate It tour.

In November 2024, Chieng was featured in the lineup for Comics Come Home 28 at TD Garden in Boston, Massachusetts.

Starting in season 14 of King of the Hill, Chieng became the new voice of Kahn Souphanousinphone who was previously voiced in earlier seasons by Toby Huss.

On 15 July 2025, Chieng and Hasan Minhaj announced Hasan Hates Ronny | Ronny Hates Hasan, a co-headlining North American tour.

In December 2025, Chieng made public service announcements on the MTA New York City Transit Authority's subway system, about the retirement of the MetroCard.

== Personal life ==
Chieng has lived in New York City since moving back to the U.S. in 2015. He is married to Hannah Pham. The couple met and began dating while studying commerce and law at the University of Melbourne. Pham later obtained a master's degree in law at New York University and worked as an attorney in the United States. Although Chieng lived in Australia for a decade, he does not have citizenship or permanent residency status there. In April 2025, Chieng became a United States citizen.

He practices Brazilian jiu-jitsu and holds the rank of blue belt.

Chieng is an avid collector of watches, an interest that first began with a Seiko 5 that he purchased during his university years in Australia. His watch collection was featured on an episode of the Hodinkee series Talking Watches and includes a rare variant of the Seiko Chronograph Ref. 6139-6010 and a vintage GMT-Master Ref. 16753 "Root Beer". Another of his watches, a two-tone Rolex dated to 1984 that he inherited from his late father, appeared on an episode of Antiques Roadshow and was valued at $5,000.

== Filmography ==
=== Film ===
Year	Title	Role	Notes
2018	Crazy Rich Asians	Edison "Eddie" Cheng	
2021	Wish Dragon	Pipa God (voice)	Animated film
2021	Bliss	Kendo	
2021	Long Story Short	Sam	
2021	Trust	Adam	
2021	Godzilla vs. Kong	Jay Wayne	
2021	Shang-Chi and the Legend of the Ten Rings	Jon Jon	
2022	Helvellyn Edge	AC Sloan	
2022	M3GAN	David	
2022	Inspector Sun and the Curse of the Black Widow	Inspector Sun (voice)	English Dub
2023	Shortcomings	Mr. Wong	
2023	Joy Ride	Chao	
2023	Vacation Friends 2	Yeon	
2024	Kung Fu Panda 4	Captain Fish (voice)	Animated film
2024	Unfrosted	Chuck	
2025	The Tiger	Zane	Short film
2026	The Devil Wears Prada 2	Himself	Cameo
2026	Avatar Aang: The Last Airbender	Fire Nation Messenger (voice)	Animated film
2026	Forgotten Island	King Truffle Wuffle (voice)	Animated film

=== Television ===
Year	Title	Role	Notes
2012	Problems	Mr. Meowgi	4 episodes
2013–2014	Legally Brown	Various	13 episodes
2013–2014	It's a Date	Winston	2 episodes
2013–2014	Have You Been Paying Attention?	Himself	3 episodes
2014	This is Littleton	Various Characters	4 episodes
2015–present	The Daily Show	Himself (correspondent)	
2016	Comedy Showroom	Himself	1 episode
2016	The Katering Show	Himself	1 episode
2017	Ronny Chieng: International Student	Himself	7 episodes
2017	Fancy Boy	Accountant	TV series
2018–2025	Scissor Seven	Seven (voice)	20 episodes
2019	Asian Comedian Destroys America!	Himself	Netflix comedy special
2020	Aunty Donna's Big Ol' House of Fun	Himself (voice)	Episode: "'Lympics"
2021–2022	Young Rock	Greg Yao	6 episodes
2021–2023	Doogie Kameāloha, M.D.	Dr. Lee	17 episodes
2021	Ten Year Old Tom	Pete (voice)	Episode: "Tom Urinates on Boston/First Responder"
2022	Speakeasy	Himself	Netflix comedy special
2023	History of the World, Part II	Kublai Khan	3 episodes
2023	Mulligan	Johnny Zhao (voice)	3 episodes
2023	American Born Chinese	Ji Gong	4 episodes
2023	Awkwafina Is Nora from Queens	Arthur	Episode: "Car Fished"
2023	The Daily Show	Himself (guest host)	Episode: "Jordan Jonas"
2023	Last Week Tonight with John Oliver	Consultant 2	Episode: "McKinsey"
2024	Grimsburg	(voice)	Episode: "The Flute Show"
2024	The Daily Show	Himself (guest host)	7 episodes
2024	Interior Chinatown	Fatty Choi	
2024	Gremlins: The Wild Batch	(voice)	
2024	Love to Hate It	Himself	Netflix comedy special
2025	Last Week Tonight with John Oliver	Moderator 2	Episode: "Online content moderation, particularly for Facebook"
2025	Krapopolis	Lapithos (voice)	Episode: "Mazed and Kingfused"
2025	The Daily Show	Himself (guest host)	
2025–present	King of the Hill	Kahn Souphanousinphone (voice)	Replaced Toby Huss
2026	The Fall and Rise of Reggie Dinkins	Barry Hu	3 episodes
2026	The Miniature Wife	Hilton Smith	5 episodes
2026	Survival of the Thickest	Donnie Wang	4 episodes

== Awards ==
=== Melbourne Comedy Festival ===
Year	Award	Result
2012	Best Newcomer Award	Won
2014	Directors' Choice Award	Won

=== Sydney Comedy Festival ===
Year	Award	Result
2013	Best of the Fest	Nominated
2014	Best of the Fest	Won

=== ARIA Music Awards ===
Year	Title	Award	Result	Ref.
2014	The Ron Way	Best Comedy Release	Nominated	
2015	Chieng Reaction	Best Comedy Release	Nominated	

== See also ==
- Chinese people in the New York metropolitan area
