= Inspector Sun and the Curse of the Black Widow =

- Theatrical release poster
- Spanish: Inspector Sun y la maldición de la viuda negra
- Directed by: Julio Soto Gúrpide
- Screenplay by: Rocco Pucillo
- Produced by: Adriana Malfatti Chen; Julio Soto Gúrpide; Karl Richards; Peter Rogers; Rocco Pucillo; Jason Kaminsky
- Edited by: Zayra Muñoz Dominguez
- Music by: Fernando Velázquez
- Production companies: The Thinklab; Kapers Animation; Gordon Box; 3Doubles Producciones; Particular Crowd
- Distributed by: Tripictures
- Release date: 28 December 2022
- Running time: 88 minutes
- Country: Spain
- Language: Spanish
- Box office: $3.7 million

Inspector Sun and the Curse of the Black Widow (Spanish: Inspector Sun y la maldición de la viuda negra) is a 2022 Spanish animated mystery thriller film directed by Julio Soto Gúrpide and based on an original screenplay by Rocco Pucillo.

== Premise ==
A noirish fiction set in a seaplane from Shanghai to San Francisco in 1934, the plot follows anthropomorphic spider Inspector Sun in a mission against his foe, the Red Locust, with the mystery vis-à-vis the death of Dr. Spindelthorp as a backdrop.

== Voice cast (English language version) ==
- Ronny Chieng as Inspector Sun, a shy and intelligent huntsman spider
- Emily Kleimo as Janey, an energetic jumping spider that accompanies Sun
- Jennifer Childs Greer as Arabella Killtop, a black widow spider who is Sun's love interest and Bugsy's former wife.
- Rich Orlow as the Red Locust, a villainous locust. Orlow also voices Mr. Scarab, a rhinoceros beetle and Lieutenant Mac
- Iain Batchelor as Captain Skeleton, a nervous housefly
- Scott Geer as Dr. Bugsy Spindlethorp, a millionaire funnel-web spider who was working for the Red Locust before his death. Geer also voices a police cop
- Jeanette Grace Gonglewski as Ant Queen, Gonglewski also voices Lady Vatchu, a hybrid bug monster created by Dr. Spindlethorp
- Paul Louis Miller as Mr. Gill Tea, a mantis assassin

== Production ==
The script by Rocco Pucillo won the 2013 Samuel Goldwyn Writing Award. The film is a The Thinklab Media and Gordon Box production, in association with 3Doubles Producciones, the participation of RTVE, support from ICAA, funding from ICO and Navarre's Sodena and collaboration from Epic Games. Ronny Chieng voiced Sun in the English version. Fernando Velázquez scored the film.

== Release ==
Kapers Animation handled worldwide sales. Distributed by Tripictures, the film was theatrically released in Spain on 28 December 2022. It was released in the United States on 27 October 2023.

== Reception ==
On the review aggregator website Rotten Tomatoes, 81% of 26 critics' reviews are positive, with an average rating of 6.3/10. The website's consensus reads: "A formally refreshing homage to Agatha Christie, Inspector Sun serves as a reasonably diverting and suitably light whodunit for the younger set." Juan Pando of Fotogramas rated the film 4 out of 5 stars, highlighting the character of Sun's aide.

== Accolades ==
Year	Award	Category	Nominee(s)	Result	Ref.
2023	78th CEC Medals	Best Animated Film		Nominated	
2023	37th Goya Awards	Best Animated Film		Nominated	

== See also ==
- List of Spanish films of 2022
