= Summer Love (TV series) =

- Genre: Comedy
- Created by: Robyn Butler; Wayne Hope
- Directed by: Kodie Bedford; Robyn Butler; Nina Buxton; Wayne Hope
- Country of origin: Australia
- Original language: English
- No. of series: 1
- No. of episodes: 8

Production
- Executive producers: Robyn Butler; Wayne Hope; Greg Sitch
- Producers: Robyn Butler; Wayne Hope
- Production companies: Gristmill Productions; Kinetic Content

Original release
- Network: ABC TV
- Release: 31 August 2022 – present

Summer Love is an Australian anthology ensemble comedy series on ABC TV, first airing on 31 August 2022. The eight-part anthology series was created and produced by Robyn Butler and Wayne Hope.

== Premise ==
An anthology series which sees eight very different sets of people rent the same beachside holiday house through the theme of love.

== Cast ==
=== Episode 1 ===
- Patrick Brammall as Tom
- Harriet Dyer as Steph
- Stephen Curry as Jonah
- Sibylla Budd as Jules
- Evelyn Pell & Mila Pell as Molly
- Matt Dower as FM Radio DJ

=== Episode 2 ===
- Miranda Tapsell as Kelly
- Richard Davies as Craig
- Lana Golga as Surf Shop Assistant
- Nicolette Minster as Deedee
- David Quirk as Bryron
- Roxanne McDonald as Elsie
- Rachel Pepper as Mother from Surf Shop
- Lisa Mitrov as Waitress

=== Episode 3 ===
- Nazeem Hussain as Imran
- Sana'a Shaik as Nabilah
- Shapoor Batliwalla as Jaaved
- Jane Harber as Caiti
- Sukhdeep Singh Bhogal (L-FRESH The LION) as Sukhdeep
- David Quirk as Byron

=== Episode 4 ===
- Robyn Butler as Marion
- Wayne Hope as Eddy

=== Episode 5 ===
- Tim Draxl as Luke
- Harry McNaughton as Olly
- Blake Richardson as Jett

=== Episode 6 ===
- Chenoa Deemal as Charlie
- Bjorn Stewart as Zeke
- Jarron Andy as Ben
- Shakira Clanton as Finlay
- Charles Wu as Roger
- Jason Klarwein as Jason

=== Episode 7 ===
- Alison Bell as Hannah
- Annie Maynard as Alex
- Claudia Greenstone as Mum
- Nick Russell as Dad
- Talia Hoskins Green as Young Hannah
- Gisele Field as Young Alex
- Harvey Devlin as Otto
- Noah Percy as Raphael
- Travis Cotton as Rob
- Alicia Banit as Ella

=== Episode 8 ===
- Johnny Carr as Dan
- Charlotte Maggi as Frankie
- Morgana O'Reilly as Becky
- Keith Robinson as Poseidon Trevor
- Bev Killick as Bev

== Production ==
Each of the eight episodes is written by a different writing team. The writing teams comprise: creators Robyn Butler and Wayne Hope, along with Kodie Bedford and Bjorn Stewart; Alison Bell; Patrick Brammall and Harriet Dyer; Nazeem Hussain; Kate Mulvany; Miranda Tapsell and James Colley; Jayden Masciulli and Nath Valvo.

== Episodes ==
No.	Title	Directed by	Written by	Original release date	Australian overnight viewers
1	"Jules and Tom & Jonah and Steph"	Robyn Butler & Wayne Hope	Patrick Brammall & Harriet Dyer	31 August 2022	290,000
Two couples, Tom (Patrick Brammall) and Jules (Sibylla Budd) & Jonah (Stephen Curry) and Steph (Harriet Dyer), travel to the house for their traditional summer holiday. The difference this year is that Steph and Jonah have their toddler Molly who takes up more space than she did last year.
2	"Kelly & Craig"	Robyn Butler & Wayne Hope	James Colley & Miranda Tapsell	7 September 2022	246,000
When Kelly (Miranda Tapsell) and Craig (Richard Davies) become parents to an orphaned joey, they are forced to consider what it would mean to be actual parents of an Aboriginal child.
3	"Imran & Nabilah"	Robyn Butler & Wayne Hope	Nazeem Hussain	14 September 2022	266,000
Imran (Nazeem Hussain), a Muslim man, grapples with the consequences of his dad's abandonment, one of them being him running away from his girlfriend, Nabilah (Sana’a Shaik), during their weekend together.
4	"Marion & Eddy"	Nina Buxton	Robyn Butler & Wayne Hope	21 September 2022	276,000
After a double booking forces them to stay together, Marion (Robyn Butler) and Eddy (Wayne Hope) find themselves challenging the behaviours that led to each of their divorces.
5	"Luke & Olly"	Nina Buxton	Jayden Masciulli & Nath Valvo	28 September 2022	217,000
Luke (Tim Draxl) and Olly (Harry McNaughton) confront societal expectations of being gay men versus what they actually want as a happy couple.
6	"Charlie & Zeke"	Kodie Bedford	Kodie Bedford & Bjorn Stewart	5 October 2022	226,000
While on a trial separation, Charlie (Chenoa Deemal) and Zeke (Bjorn Stewart) both come to the house for their traditional anniversary weekend and neither is willing to give it up.
7	"Hannah & Alex"	Robyn Butler & Wayne Hope	Alison Bell	12 October 2022	236,000
Two sisters, Hannah (Alison Bell) and Alex (Annie Maynard), leave their chaotic family lives behind for a recharge night together but somehow bring the chaos with them.
8	"Frankie & Trevor"	Robyn Butler & Wayne Hope	Kate Mulvany	19 October 2022	272,000
The cleaners of the holiday house, Becky (Morgana O'Reilly) and Dan (Johnny Carr), are interrupted by their troubled niece, Frankie (Charlotte Maggi), who comes to stay, and the sudden arrival of Trevor (Keith Robinson), a man with a disability on the front lawn.

== Awards and nominations ==
Year	Award	Category	Nominee	Result
2022	AACTA Awards	Best Television Comedy Series	Summer Love	Nominated
2022	AACTA Awards	Best Comedy Performer	Harriet Dyer	Nominated
2022	AACTA Awards	Best Comedy Performer	Patrick Brammall	Nominated
2022	AACTA Awards	Best Sound in Television	Scott Findlay, Nick Godkin, Justin Lloyd – Episode 1: Jules and Tom & Jonah and Steph	Nominated
2023	Logie Awards	Most Outstanding Comedy Program	Summer Love	Nominated
2023	Logie Awards	Most Popular Actor	Patrick Brammall	Nominated

== See also ==
- It's a Date
