= Now Add Honey =

- Theatrical release poster
- Directed by: Wayne Hope
- Written by: Robyn Butler
- Produced by: Robyn Butler; Wayne Hope; Louisa Kors
- Starring: Robyn Butler; Lucy Fry; Portia de Rossi; Lucy Durack; Hamish Blake; Erik Thomson; Angus Sampson; Ben Lawson; Robbie Magasiva; Philippa Coulthard; David Field
- Cinematography: Ben Nott
- Edited by: John Scott
- Music by: Craig Pilkington
- Production company: Gristmill
- Distributed by: Eagle Films
- Release dates: 6 May 2015 (Bentonville); 5 November 2015 (Australia)
- Running time: 100 minutes
- Country: Australia
- Language: English
- Box office: $63,683

Now Add Honey is a 2015 Australian comedy film written by Robyn Butler and directed by Wayne Hope. The film stars Butler, Lucy Fry, Portia de Rossi, Lucy Durack, Hamish Blake, Angus Sampson and Erik Thomson.

Butler was nominated for the AACTA Award for Best Actress in a Leading Role at the 5th AACTA Awards.

== Synopsis ==
Caroline is delighted when her sister, Beth, brings her movie star daughter home to visit. Normal life implodes, however, when Beth is suddenly sent to rehab, and Honey has to move in.

== Cast ==
- Robyn Butler as Caroline Morgan
- Lucy Fry as Honey Halloway
- Portia de Rossi as Beth Halloway
- Lucy Durack as Katie Halloway
- Hamish Blake as Alex Kilstein
- Erik Thomson as Richard Morgan
- Angus Sampson as Mick Croyston
- Ben Lawson as Joshua Redlich
- Robbie Magasiva as Sebastian Tasi
- Philippa Coulthard as Clare Morgan
- David Field as Roger Gardam
- Lucinda Armstrong Hall as Harriet Morgan
- Ben Schumann as Liam
- Sandy Gore as Diane
- Luke McGregor as Charles
- Stephen Hall as Hotel Concierge
- Tim Potter as Eric
- Heidi Arena as Rhonda
- Dave Thornton as Detective Smith
- Emily Taheny as Detective Davis
- Marty Sheargold as Gavin
- Faustina Agolley as Sian

== See also ==
- Cinema of Australia
