= Audrey's Kitchen =

Australian television series

Audrey's Kitchen is a satirical television cooking series produced by Working Dog Productions in Melbourne, Australia, for ABC Television. Each episode is only three minutes in length and features fictional writer, chef, life coach and choreographer Audrey Gordon, played by Australian actress Heidi Arena. The first series of ten episodes aired in 2012. The second series started airing in 2013.

== See also ==
- List of Australian television series
- List of cooking shows
