= Ronny Chieng: International Student =

2017 Australian comedy TV series

- Created by: Ronny Chieng; Declan Fay
- Written by: Ronny Chieng; Declan Fay
- Directed by: Jonathan Brough
- Country of origin: Australia
- No. of series: 1
- No. of episodes: 7

Production
- Producer: Donna Andrews

Original release
- Network: ABC Television
- Release: 7 June 2017

Ronny Chieng: International Student is an Australian television comedy series first screened on the ABC in 2017. The series follows the adventures of comedian Ronny Chieng as an international student, a fictionalised account of his own experiences as a law student at the University of Melbourne.

== Production ==
The series began as part of the ABC's 2016 anthology series Comedy Showroom which consisted of six half-hour comedy TV pilots. It is directed by Jonathan Brough.

The pilot for Ronny Chieng: International Student was successful in being given the go-ahead for a full series.

== Cast ==
=== Main cast ===
- Ronny Chieng as himself
- Molly Daniels as Asher Angus
- Hoa Xuande as Elvin
- Shuang Hu as Wei-Jun
- Keith Brockett as Joderick
- Patch May as Craig Cooper
- Anthony Morgan as Professor Declan Dale
- Laurence Boxhall as Daniel
- Linda Schragger as Mrs. Chieng
- Dave Eastgate as Mick Rosenberg

=== Supporting cast ===
- Adrienne Pickering as Karen Ford
- Quin Ellery as Nicholas
- Brenton Cosier as James
- Daniel Di Giovanni as Alexander
- Felicity Ward as Post-Grad Student

=== Guest cast ===
- Louise Siversen as Joy-Anne
- Paul Denny as Gerard
- Greg Larsen as IT Guy
- Tim Potter as Librarian
- Gareth Yuen as Denedict
- Ryder Jack as Hipster
- Aaron Chen as Trojan Wang

== Broadcast and release ==
Series 1 of Ronny Chieng: International Student began on ABC in Australia on 7 June 2017. In the US it was released on Comedy Central's app on 13 August 2018.

Additionally, it aired on BBC in the UK, CBC in Canada, Comedy Central in America, and Comedy Central Asia in Asia.

=== Series 1 ===
No. overall	No. in series	Title	Run time	Original release date	AU viewers
1	1	"Pilot"	26 mins	N/A	N/A
In order to obtain a textbook for their first law assignment, Ronny and his friends must enter a drinking contest.
2	2	"Guest: (N.) Someone Who Leaves."	27 mins	7 June 2017	434,000
The Asian students come into conflict with American student Craig who arrives at the International House dormitory intent on partying.
3	3	"Asian Rules Football"	27 mins	14 June 2017	469,000
Ronny, Elvin and Wei Jun are recruited to use their Jianzi skills in an Australian rules football rivalry between the law and medical faculties.
4	4	"Clash! Ronny vs Instructions! Obey?"	26 mins	21 June 2017	N/A
Ronny covers Asher's shift at the campus co-op store and comes into conflict with her officious boss. Meanwhile, Craig discovers bubble tea.
5	5	"Extension Quest"	25 mins	28 June 2017	N/A
Ronny accidentally unleashes a virus on Asher's obsolete laptop computer. Ronny and Asher then take on separate quests: to fix her computer and to gain an assignment extension.
6	6	"For the Love of Theatre(Er)(Her)"	27 mins	5 July 2017	N/A
Ronny joins the faculty comedy revue to spend time with Asher, but can't hold his temper at the inept and offensive production written and directed by Daniel.
7	7	"Performance Enhancement"	24 mins	12 July 2017	N/A
Several students take pseudoephedrine while studying for exams. Ronny scrambles to rectify the situation after allowing others to copy Wei Jun's course notes.
