= Very Small Business (TV series) =

- Genre: Situation comedy
- Created by: Wayne Hope; Gary McCaffrie; Robyn Butler
- Directed by: Daina Reid
- Starring: Wayne Hope; Kym Gyngell
- Composer: Craig Pilkington
- Country of origin: Australia
- Original language: English
- No. of seasons: 2
- No. of episodes: 14

Production
- Executive producers: Robyn Butler; Wayne Hope; Geoff Porz; Greg Sitch; Debbie Lee
- Producers: Robyn Butler; Wayne Hope
- Production locations: Melbourne, Victoria
- Cinematography: Joanne Donahoe-Beckwith
- Editor: Chris Branagan
- Running time: 30 minutes approx
- Production companies: Australian Broadcasting Corporation; Gristmill

Original release
- Network: ABC1
- Release: 3 September – 8 October 2008

Very Small Business is an Australian television comedy series first broadcast on Wednesday 3 September 2008 on ABC1. The series is written and created by Wayne Hope, Gary McCaffrie, and Robyn Butler, and produced by Hope and Butler. It comprises fourteen half-hour episodes.

A new season began screening in September 2018 titled Back in Very Small Business. It comprises six half-hour episodes.

== Synopsis ==
Don Angel is the small business owner of the Worldwide Business Group. The business includes the publishing of controversial magazines such as Feelin' Great, Railway Union Monthly, and Music, Music, Music, Music, which are methods leveraged to sell advertising space to unsuspecting businesses. Angel hired Ray Leonard, a down-and-out former journalist for The Australian, as his senior journalist and sole employee.

== Cast ==
- Wayne Hope as Don Angel / Marcus Goode / James White / Haydn King / Kerry Akermanis / Pete Mandela
- Kym Gyngell as Ray Leonard Leonard / Harvey Bunning
- Roman Hadley-Lund as Leslie Leonard
- Queenie van de Zandt as Tina
- Geoff Paine as Lloyd
- Molly Daniels as Sam Angel
- Sally Cooper as Janet Wilson
- Elena Mandalis as Olivia Micheledes
- Marg Downey as Yvonne
- Steve Mouzakis as Dr Rolf
- Aaron Chen as Kim Park
- Brian Vriends as Jerome
- Jeremy Kewley as Ron Greally
- Katerina Kotsonis as Blanca
- Ian Bliss as Tony Orsini
- David James as Sol Dolman
- Beejan Land as Lynton McGyver
- Neil Pigot as Radio Announcer
- Jane Harber as Coco

== Episodes ==
=== Season 1 "Very Small Business" ===
No. overall	No. in season	Title	Directed by	Written by	Original release date
1	1	"Basics of Team Building"	Daina Reid	Wayne Hope, Gary McCaffrie & Robyn Butler	3 September 2008
Don needs a senior journalist for the World Wide Group, and finds Ray, a former journalist with The Australian.
2	2	"Human Resources"	Daina Reid	Wayne Hope, Gary McCaffrie & Robyn Butler	10 September 2008
Don's plans to start up a dog wash franchise are interrupted when his kids turn up at the office.
3	3	"Export Fluctuations"	Daina Reid	Wayne Hope, Gary McCaffrie & Robyn Butler	17 September 2008
After he asks his estranged daughter to do the graphic design for the Dog Wash, Ray tells Don why they stopped speaking six years ago.
4	4	"Diversification of Capital"	Daina Reid	Wayne Hope, Gary McCaffrie & Robyn Butler	24 September 2008
Don escapes his creditors when he and Ray film a late night TV ad for the Don's Dirty Dog Wash franchise.
5	5	"Systems Analysis"	Daina Reid	Wayne Hope, Gary McCaffrie & Robyn Butler	1 October 2008
While Don's stomach problems force him to see a psychologist, Ray tries to sell the Dog Wash franchise.
6	6	"Obligations Under the Taxation Act"	Daina Reid	Wayne Hope, Gary McCaffrie & Robyn Butler	8 October 2008
As the Australian Tax Office launches an investigation into World Wide Group's shady tax management, Ray attempts to consolidate his relationship with his ex-wife and daughter.

=== Season 2 "Back in Very Small Business" ===
No. overall	No. in season	Title	Directed by	Written by	Original release date
7	1	"All Over Range Rover"	Robyn Butler	Wayne Hope, Gary McCaffrie & Robyn Butler	5 September 2018
Don's desperate to arrive at the Small Business Awards in a new prestige car. Following a financial setback Don works to quickly increase sales. Ray could solve the crisis by selling a franchise but only on one condition.
8	2	"By Design"	Robyn Butler	Wayne Hope, Gary McCaffrie & Robyn Butler	11 September 2018
Leslie fights with staff about his new role and Ray struggles to get him to lower his artistic expectations. Don receives a visit from the ACCC and Leslie helps Cody come up with an ingenious women’s fashion belt for BRRR!
9	3	"Bad Influence"	Robyn Butler	Wayne Hope, Gary McCaffrie & Robyn Butler	19 September 2018
Sam brings in Coco for a photo shoot with the 'Ammo', which has gone viral on Instagram. Don’s son asks for money to record an album and Ray avoids his ex as she tries to stop him financially assisting Leslie's transition.
10	4	"Litigating Circumstances"	Robyn Butler	Wayne Hope, Gary McCaffrie & Robyn Butler	26 September 2018
The Ammo belt success is short lived thanks to a Facebook video of the Cambodian manufacturer going viral. Don deals with the fallout whilst also attending mediation for the Yaytionery's pineapple rubbers class action.
11	5	"Crossing The Line"	Robyn Butler	Wayne Hope, Gary McCaffrie & Robyn Butler	3 October 2018
Don tries desperately to please Bridget, promising to deliver an order stuck at the docks. Don and Vijay awkwardly confront the Wharfies. Leslie's romantic encounter goes pear-shaped and Ray is forced to call Yvonne for help.
12	6	"Family Trust"	Robyn Butler	Wayne Hope, Gary McCaffrie & Robyn Butler	10 October 2018
Angry with Bridget, Don advertises the cowhide chairs on Gumtree. Don and Sam must attend mediation at the ATO. Don’s son Alex demands income derived from the family trust and Sam struggles to deal with the family conflict.
13	7	"Guardian Angel"	Robyn Butler	Wayne Hope, Gary McCaffrie & Robyn Butler	17 October 2018
Furious with Don, Alex has changed his last name and Don channels his shock and hurt into rebranding the WWBG. Ray escapes for a camping trip with Yvonne, and when Leslie falls apart he turns to Don.
14	8	"FreeDon of Speech"	Robyn Butler	Wayne Hope, Gary McCaffrie & Robyn Butler	24 October 2018
When the Advertising Standards Bureau upholds a complaint against Don's Dirty Dog Wash, Don and Ray face the prospect of going their separate ways. Leslie and Sam rally to help their fathers.

== DVD release ==
=== Very Small Business ===
Set Details	Special Features
6 Episodes; 16:9 Aspect Ratio; 1.78:1 Fullframe; Subtitles: No; English (2.0 Dolby); Total running time: Approx 158 minutes	Don's Essentials of Small Business; Ray's Cognitive Behaviour Challenges; Don's Job Interviews (Roz Hammond, Bob Franklin & Tony Martin); Ray's Other Advertorials; Don's Colonoscopy; Don's Business Insider Interview; 8 Deleted Scenes; Making of Very Small Business; Out Takes

== See also ==
- List of Australian television series
- List of programs broadcast by ABC (Australian TV network)
- The Librarians
