= Dear Life (TV series) =

Australian television series

- Genre: Comedy drama
- Screenplay by: Robyn Butler; Wayne Hope
- Directed by: Robyn Butler; Wayne Hope
- Starring: Brooke Satchwell; Eleanor Matsuura; Ben Lawson; Ryan Johnson (actor)
- Country of origin: Australia
- Original language: English
- No. of series: 1
- No. of episodes: 6

Production
- Executive producers: Robyn Butler; Wayne Hope; Greg Sitch; Caliah Scobie; Alicia Brown
- Producer: MaryAnne Carroll
- Production company: Gristmill

Original release
- Network: Stan
- Release: 1 January 2026

Dear Life is an Australian comedy drama television series written and directed by Robyn Butler and Wayne Hope. The series stars Brooke Satchwell and Eleanor Matsuura and premiered on 1 January 2026 on Stan.

== Premise ==
A woman learns of the lives of people who have benefited from her recently deceased fiancé's organ donation.

== Cast and characters ==
- Brooke Satchwell as Lillian Vanderberg
- Eleanor Matsuura as Mary Matsumoto
- Ryan Johnson as Hamish Vandenberg
- Ben Lawson as Andrew Schneider
- Annie Maynard as Kelly Schneider
- Daniel Henshall as Jack Gardener
- Kerry Armstrong as Michelle
- Megan Smart as Taylor Parkinson
- Khisraw Jones-Shukoor as Ash Dost

== Production ==
The series, initially announced as Love Divided by Eleven, is written and directed by Robyn Butler and Wayne Hope. The pair are a married couple, and Butler said that the idea for the storyline came from imagining the scenario if her husband Hope died.

Gristmill is the producer, marking its first show for Stan. Executive producers are Butler, Hope and Greg Sitch, alongside Caliah Scobie and Alicia Brown, with MaryAnne Carroll the producer. Filming took place across Victoria with locations including Ballarat, Melbourne and Yarra Valley.

The cast is led by Brooke Satchwell, and includes Eleanor Matsuura, Ryan Johnson, Ben Lawson, Annie Maynard, Daniel Henshall, Kerry Armstrong, Megan Smart, and Khisraw Jones-Shukoor.

The series is described as "the kind of dramedy that isn't afraid to go all-out when it comes to the dark side of things".

On 12 November 2025, Stan confirmed the series was retitled to Dear Life and would air on 1 January 2026.

== Episodes ==
| No. | Title | Original release date |
|---|---|---|
| 1 | "How Can You Mend A Broken Heart?" | 1 January 2026 |
| 2 | "The Price You Pay" | 1 January 2026 |
| 3 | "Three Sentences" | 1 January 2026 |
| 4 | "Hearts and Minds" | 1 January 2026 |
| 5 | "Grit" | 1 January 2026 |
| 6 | "Circles" | 1 January 2026 |

== Broadcast ==
All six episodes of the series were streamed on Stan from 1 January 2026.

== Reception ==
Anthony Morris, writing for ScreenHub Australia, gave it 4 stars out of 5, writing "Its relatively unflinching look at the aftermath of trauma and the struggle to take even the smallest steps towards healing make it refreshingly authentic. As are the performances, which are excellent all around".

David Michael Brown, writing for Flicks.com.au, said that the series "tackles its topic with intelligence, wit and style", and praised Satchwell's performance.

Luke Buckmaster, writing in The Guardian, gave the show 2 stars out of 5, saying that Brooke Satchwell outshone her co-stars, and called the series "clunky", saying that the plotline "feels a little too 'everything is connected'".

== Awards ==
Logie Awards
| Year | Category | Nominee | Result | Ref |
|---|---|---|---|---|
| 2026 | Best Lead Actress in a Drama | Brooke Satchwell | Winner | |
| 2026 | Best Supporting Actress | Eleanor Matsuura | Nomination | |
| 2026 | Best Drama Program | Dear Life | Nomination | |
