= The Inbestigators =

2019 Australian television series

- Series' title card
- Genre: Comedy; Mystery
- Created by: Robyn Butler; Wayne Hope
- Written by: Robyn Butler; Wayne Hope; Molly Daniels; Lisa Marie Corso; Maddy Butler; Jayden Masciulli; Bob Franklin
- Directed by: Robyn Butler; Wayne Hope; Nina Buxton; Ian Reiser; Tim Bartley
- Starring: Abby Bergman; Anna Cooke; Aston Droomer; Jamil Smyth-Secka
- Composer: Craig Pilkington
- Country of origin: Australia
- Original language: English
- No. of seasons: 2
- No. of episodes: 20 (40 segments)

Production
- Executive producers: Robyn Butler; Wayne Hope; Bernadette O'Mahony; Greg Sitch
- Producers: Robyn Butler; Wayne Hope
- Editors: Angie Higgins; Kathy Freeman; Mark Atkin; Ian Carmichael
- Camera setup: Single-camera
- Running time: 30 minutes (15 minutes per segment)

Original release
- Network: ABC Me
- Release: 21 June – 30 November 2019

The Inbestigators (stylised as The InBESTigators) is an Australian mystery children's television series. The show stars Abby Bergman, Anna Cooke, Aston Droomer and Jamil Smyth-Secka as Ava Andrikides, Maudie Miller, Ezra Banks and Kyle Klimson, respectively. The characters are fifth-graders who solve crimes in their school and neighbourhood. Created by Robyn Butler and Wayne Hope, the series has the comic tone of Little Lunch (another series on which they had worked) and an air of mystery. The show aired in two series from 21 June to 30 November 2019 on ABC Me. Netflix released the first and second series in mid-2019 and early 2020 respectively.

The Inbestigators garnered critical acclaim, with praise for its humour and cast, though its characters drew mixed opinions. The show received two AACTA Award nominations for Best Children's Television Series. A spin-off web series, The InBESTigators: Crime Crack, was released in July 2019; a cast Q&A was released in late 2019, followed by a study guide during the COVID-19 pandemic.

== Premise ==
The series is centred around Ezra Banks, a tech-savvy boy; Maudie Miller, a socially-awkward, intelligent, aspiring private investigator; Ava Andrikides, an outgoing, dramatic girl; and Kyle Klimson, an athletic goof. They form the InBESTigators, a detective agency that solves crimes in their school and neighbourhood. After a case is solved, they describe it on a vlog which Ezra posts on their website.

== Cast ==
=== Main ===
- Abby Bergman as Ava Andrikides, an outgoing, social and dramatic girl who loves throwing parties and raising money for charity
- Anna Cooke as Maudie Miller, a mysterious, brilliant aspiring investigator who solves many problems in The InBESTigators
- Aston Droomer as Ezra Banks, a tech-savvy, precocious boy
- Jamil Smyth-Secka as Kyle Klimson, an athletic goof-off who is forgetful and easily distracted

=== Recurring ===
- Maria Angelico as Miss Tan, a clumsy but passionate grade-five teacher
- Clarke Richards as Mr Barker, a laid-back grade-six teacher
- James Saunders as Mr McGillick, the strict, tidy school principal
- Eliza Ong as Poppy Banks, Ezra's younger sister, who occasionally helps him report cases
- Hannah Johnston as Amelia, one of Ava's friends, who is often left out
- Hana Leigh Struckett as Pixie, Ava's forgetful best friend
- Madeline Jevic as Mrs Parides, the school's P. E. teacher
- Zac Mineo as James, an arrogant, rude student
- Ayiana Ncube as Ruby, one of Ava's friends, who is afraid of heights
- Zakariah Rahalli as Mario, one of Kyle's friends
- Ethan Pham as Diet, a grade-five student who is good at maths
- Matilda Hardwick as Caitlin, one of Ava's friends, who wears glasses
- Sienna Foggy as Esther, one of Ava's friends
- Bailey McMillan-Power as Justin, a grade-five student whose parents often do his homework
- Soraya Briggs as Max, one of Ava's friends, who is claustrophobic
- Marita Wilcox as Mrs. Maniaci, Ezra's often-impatient neighbour
- Jack Goodsell as Archie, one of Kyle's friends
- Frank Woodley as Brian, Maudie's father
- Monty Henderson as Toby, Diet's best friend
- Kayleigh O'Dwyer as Dayani, a grade-six student who wants to be a professional basketball player
- Milla Bishop as Miranda, an arrogant girl who thinks she is famous because she appeared in a commercial when she was younger
- Shayne Warren as Paul, a rude grade-six student

== Development ==
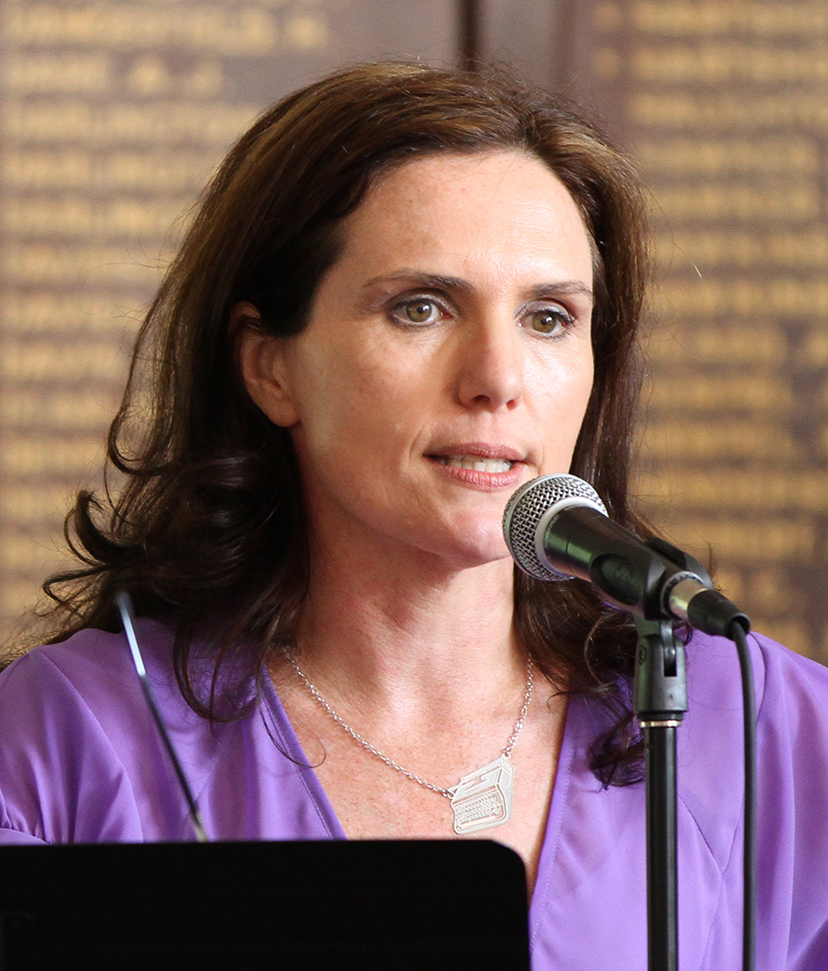
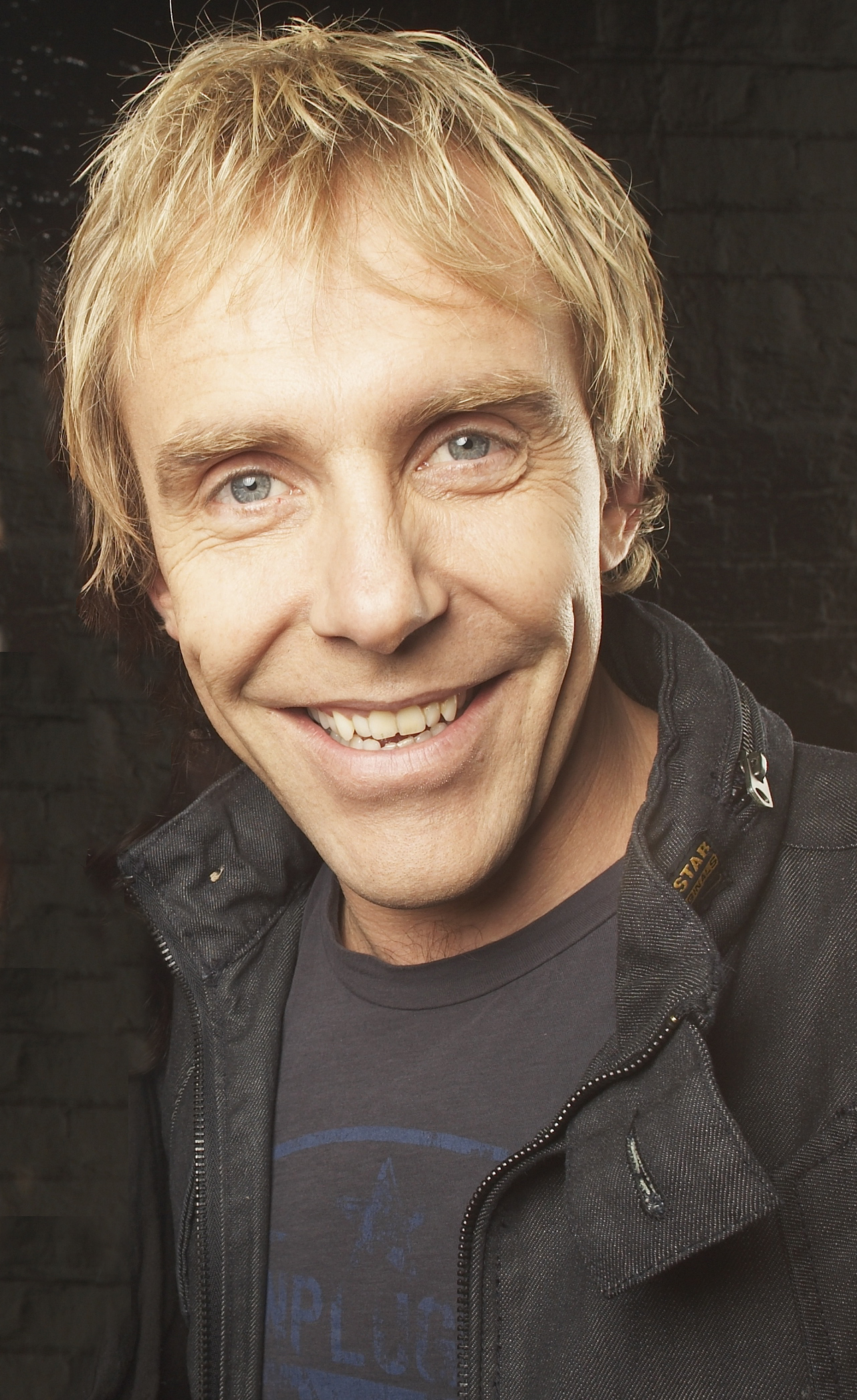
Series creators Robyn Butler (left) and Wayne Hope

The Inbestigators is based on an original idea by Robyn Butler. It was created by Butler and Wayne Hope, who are also known for Little Lunch. After the success of Little Lunch, Butler and Hope wanted to create another children's comedy. For The Inbestigators, they "took the comic tone of Little Lunch and married with it the private detective, mystery genre". Butler explained that she and Hope created the show as a reaction to the "world [they are] living in", which she considered toxic and affected children's viewpoints. In response, she decided to make a show about kids with "ethnic diversity and gender equity and respect and integrity and kindness" to encourage "something else" in children. Screen Australia head of production Sally Callan said, "It's vital that young Australians are able to see their country, their stories and hear their accent reflected on the screen ... The characters in The Inbestigators ... are distinctive and inclusive, and tell stories that are innovative and culturally significant." In June 2018, ABC and Screen Australia greenlit the series. Development was funded by the Australian Children's Television Foundation (ACTF) and ABC.

Writing for The Inbestigators, by Robyn Butler, Wayne Hope, Molly Daniels, Lisa Marie Corso, Maddy Butler, Jayden Masciulli and Bob Franklin, began in 2017. Butler and Hope instructed the writers to keep the scripts clear and simple without dumbing them down, and to ensure that the children's dialogue was child-like: "Rather than writing what was funny or nostalgic for them, they had to get into the bones of a 10-year-old."

After the scripts were written, the team began to focus on the main cast; they sought talent and confidence. After 715 auditions, newcomers Aston Droomer, Anna Cooke, Abby Bergman and Jamil Smyth-Secka were cast as Ezra Banks, Maudie Miller, Ava Andrikides and Kyle Klimson. The series used many children in guest roles, most of whom had auditioned for the main roles. Cooke heard about auditions for The Inbestigators through her school newsletter. She thought it "looked [like] fun", and attended "three or four auditions". For the role, she cut her hair short. In the auditions, Bergman learnt and performed lines for the casting agency. She attended four auditions, the last of which was the chemistry read. Droomer's agency, Emma Raciti Management, sent an audition request for his role in The Inbestigators. Before the first audition, he needed to learn two scripts; for the following auditions he learnt more scripts, met with the series' creators and did a chemistry read.

The Inbestigators used a single-camera setup. To create 40 episodes, the production team required outside funding, which Netflix provided. Production was originally scheduled for July to November 2018. Filming began on 19 July 2018 at Moorabbin Primary School in Melbourne, and the wrap date was pushed back to December. The children worked for eight hours a day, with ten-minute breaks each hour and tutoring on set. Filming wrapped in November. Dan Maxwell was the series' photography director, and Simon McCutcheon was its production designer. The creators originally wanted to create the detective-agency set at their Port Melbourne production office; realising that travel would be difficult, however, they built it in the staff car park. Episodes were not filmed chronologically; scenes at the same location were shot together. There was a one-week break between filming of the first and second series. They needed to be filmed simultaneously due to the child actors' rapid growth.

== Themes ==
The Inbestigators focusses on themes of honesty, loyalty, kindness, friendship, teamwork and responsibility. According to TV Tonight, instead of "nasty adult vices", the show's crimes are justified by desires to fit in or avoid loneliness. When caught, culprits apologise and learn a lesson or moral, which, according to Common Sense Media, are pertinent to tweens.

== Episodes ==
=== Series overview ===
Series	Episodes	Originally released		Netflix release date
Series	Episodes	First released	Last released	Netflix release date
1	20	21 June 2019	10 July 2019	9 August 2019
2	20	11 November 2019	30 November 2019	10 January 2020

=== Series 1 (2019) ===
No. overall	No. in season	Title	Directed by (Note: Crew information is taken from the credits.)	Written by	Original release date
1	1	"The Case of the Curious New Girl"	Wayne Hope	Robyn Butler	21 June 2019
After unsuccessfully asking principal McGillick for $75 to buy website software, Ezra is instructed to look after a new student. His friend Ava sells cupcakes to raise money, and says that the student is Maudie Miller; Maudie is nice, although they have not met. Ezra is hit by a ball thrown by Billy, a football player without cleats (required for the team) – not Kyle, who usually does. In his classroom, Ezra reads a riddle and is amazed when Maudie answers it. Ava arrives to meet Maudie, who goes missing. Ezra puts Ava's cupcake-money box near the drawer while she looks for Maudie. After Ezra is hit by Kyle's ball, Maudie and Ava return with Mr McGillick. The money box is in Ezra's bag, and Mr. McGillick suspects that Ezra took it to buy website software (which he denies). Maudie figures out that the ball made the box roll into Ezra's bag. The box is full of rocks, however, and Maudie explains that the money was replaced by Billy (who took it to buy cleats). Impressed by Maudie's skills, Ezra forms a detective agency with her; Kyle and Ava join, calling it "the Inbestigators".
2	2	"The Case of the Disappearing Deliveries"	Robyn Butler	Robyn Butler	22 June 2019
After distributing maps to the Inbestigators' office (Ezra's granny flat), a woman named Sophie arrives with a mystery. Initially unimpressed because the Inbestigators are children, Sophie decides to let them solve her case after Maudie observes that she works at the yoghurt shop and rides a bike by looking at her pants. Sophie explains that parcels she ordered were stolen. The Inbestigators visit her house, where her usually-tidy younger brother Oliver makes a mess. Sophie's friend Grace seems jealous of her salary, leading them to suspect her of stealing the parcels. This is later disproved, however, since she was working when the parcels arrived. Oliver leaves to help Joanna, a neighbour who constantly sings arias from operas. Joanna's dog Dusty scratches something, and Oliver is found to have Sophie's phone; he explains that he stole the parcels, and made a mess to try to avoid going to Joanna's (since her singing annoys him). They find the parcel in what Dusty was scratching, and Joanna promises to stop singing while Oliver is around.
3	3	"The Case of the Missing Solar System"	Wayne Hope	Robyn Butler	23 June 2019
The grade-five students arrive with their solar-system dioramas. Justin, whose parents are away, usually makes the best dioramas; Pixie's diorama goes missing, and Kyle finds a poor-quality one in the bin. Since Pixie was late, no one saw her diorama (including Justin, who was also late and was seen carrying his diorama outside the boys' toilet at the end of PE). Pixie says that her diorama had nine pink planets (one of which was a softball) and stick-on earrings as stars. Amelia had found a pink softball near the art room where the Inbestigators go to investigate. They find wet paint and Pixie's earrings. Maudie concludes that Justin stole Pixie's diorama, threw an extra planet away, painted the other ones, removed the earrings and blow-dried the paint. She proves this with the late book (which shows Justin arriving much earlier than the end of PE), and says that the poor-quality diorama Kyle had found belongs to Justin. Miss Tan asks how Justin made his previous dioramas, and Maudie explains that his parents made them for him. As punishment, Justin must remake Pixie's diorama as the girls tell him how.
4	4	"The Case of the Distressed Dancer"	Wayne Hope	Robyn Butler	24 June 2019
While Ava is at tennis camp, Ezra and Maudie meet Zac, a dancer whose performance music was sabotaged. They go to his dance school; a teacher does not allow watching dance lessons so they enrol Kyle. The teacher searches through the lost-and-found (where she finds a phone case) for an outfit for Kyle to wear. Maudie and Ezra ask Zac where the technician is. Zac does not remember her name, and had disregarded her offer to work on the music. A phone belonging to the technician, Trish, is cracked. Trish says that this happened because Claudia had startled Trish when she was late. Kyle finds that his fellow dancers do not like Zac's group, but does not see them perform. After searching the lost-and-found for the phone case (which looks like Zac's), Maudie deduces that Trish had sped up the music and disguised her phone as Zac's. While trying to remove the case, Claudia startled her and she lost the case and phone; she later found the phone. Trish had felt that Zac's group treated her poorly. As punishment, she and Zac's group must clean the dance studio.
5	5	"The Case of the Sleepover Secret"	Robyn Butler	Robyn Butler	25 June 2019
Ava becomes depressed when Pixie, her best friend, stops talking to her. Maudie asks her to recount the events before Pixie stopped talking to her. Ava explains that at a sleepover, after they chose a film to watch – accidentally leaving out Amelia – she saw Pixie applying lip gloss (which she does when she is nervous). To cheer her up they take a selfie, accidentally leaving Amelia out again. When she saw that Pixie was still nervous, she asked her what was wrong. Pixie texted her that her parents were divorcing; Amelia entered the room, causing them to stop texting because they thought it would be rude. After a visit to Ava's bedroom, Pixie left the sleepover and later stopped talking to her. Maudie concludes that Amelia, who felt left out and thought Ava and Pixie were texting about her, noticed Pixie's lip gloss marks on her phone (enabling her to unlock it). She read about Pixie's parents' divorce and talked about it to Pixie. Thinking Ava told Amelia about the divorce, Pixie was angry. Amelia apologises, explaining that Pixie's anger made it harder for her to tell the truth.
6	6	"The Case of the Big Mouth Challenge"	Wayne Hope	Wayne Hope, Lisa Marie Corso, Molly Daniels, Jayden Masciulli and Robyn Butler	26 June 2019
New boy Ben, seems lonely, so Maudie and Ezra sit with him at lunchtime. Although he is quiet, Ben says that he has many Disc Chockeys (large, popular chocolate biscuits) and larger ones which are only available in America. After fitting a Disc Chockey in his mouth without breaking it, he becomes popular and promises a month's worth of Disc Chockeys to anyone else who can do it. Many people try and fail, and the Disc Chockeys make everyone over-competitive and mean. Maudie learns that the Disc Chockey Ben had put in his mouth was a normal, smaller one, but the Disc Chockeys he gave everyone else were the larger ones from America. Ben apologises, saying that he only created the challenge to make friends.
7	7	"The Case of the Pestering Prank Caller"	Wayne Hope	Robyn Butler	27 June 2019
Ezra explains the "Franklin Cube" to Maudie: a box detecting where phone calls originate, sold by a man named Tom with a son named Luca. Tom's sales are low and he cannot pay Jack, his employee who works on Saturdays. Maudie refuses to buy it, but a silent, unknown person calls Ezra's phone. His neighbour, Mrs. Maniaci, accuses Ezra of making similar calls (which he denies). Many of Ezra's other neighbours have also received calls between four and five o'clock. From another call, Maudie deduces that the caller is a child who sneezes and sniffles. Ezra urges Maudie to buy the Franklin Cube, suspecting someone connected with Tom of trying to boost sales, and they learn that the neighbours receiving calls had received quotes from Tom. They visit his shop, and conclude that Luca made the calls. Maudie says that Luca's sneezing and sniffling came from an allergy, since Tom said "we're both allergic" while Jack was cuddling the cat. Ava organises publicity for Tom's shop, increasing his sales.
8	8	"The Case of the Spoiled Sports Day"	Wayne Hope	Robyn Butler	28 June 2019
Kyle usually participates in all the events on Sports Day, but his favourite is the 100-metre sprint. When he races Ethan, he often passes him right before the finish. However, this time Ethan beats Kyle. Mrs. Parides scolds Kyle, bans him from the rest of the events, and tells him to apologise to Ethan and pick up the flag. Kyle, depressed, retreats to the library and Maudie, Ava and Ezra join him. He explains that he was disappointed, since he prepared well for the event; he adds that he and Ethan were on good terms before the race, fooling around while Ethan prepared the mats and measured the track. While Kyle picks up the flag and apologises to Ethan, Maudie measures the track and finds it 94 metres long (where Kyle usually passes Ethan). Ethan is banned from the rest of the events for cheating and disqualified from the race, making Kyle the winner.
9	9	"The Case of the Exciting Excursion"	Ian Reiser	Jayden Masciulli and Robyn Butler	29 June 2019
Miss Tan's grade-five class is going on a rock-climbing excursion. Mario asks if it is safe, and Miss Tan assures him that it is. On the day of the trip, the permission slips go missing. Miss Tan returns to the classroom to look for the slips, and the class follows her. Maudie suspects Ruby of hiding the slips, since she is uninterested in finding them and is acrophobic. Ruby denies this, and Mario announces that he has found the slips. Checking Mario's slip, Maudie notices that it is signed "nonna" instead of a name. She deduces that Mario hid the slips because his nonna (grandmother) refused to sign a slip (thinking that rock climbing was unsafe), and the excursion would still go ahead. When he heard that they needed the slips, he took them and signed a spare one himself. After Mr. McGillick convinces Mario's nonna that the excursion is safe, he joins the rest of the class.
10	10	"The Case of the Very Lost Notebook"	Wayne Hope	Robyn Butler	30 June 2019
After losing her notebook (her most prized possession), Maudie becomes depressed and cannot think or remember. To find it, the Inbestigators retrace her steps. Ava recalls Maudie having her notebook during health class, and they unsuccessfully search the kitchen. Ezra remembers that Maudie's notebook was in her apron pocket during the fire drill, when they went to the oval. When Ezra suggests that it went through the washing machine with the aprons, Maudie is gloomier and Ava advises that they continue retracing her steps. Kyle remembers that her notebook dropped from her apron during her handstand (before he fell asleep, waking up when Mrs. Parides and the grade-fours found him. Thinking that Mrs. Parides might have the notebook, the Inbestigators ask her but she does not. Kyle suddenly runs to the sports shed, thinking that the grade-fours accidentally put it away with the equipment. The notebook is found, and Maudie hugs Kyle. She shows the Inbestigators pictures of her and her mum, who died when she was young, and Ava wonders if Maudie could not remember because she was afraid of forgetting her mum.
11	11	"The Case of the Suspect Sprinkler"	Ian Reiser	Robyn Butler and Lisa Marie Corso	2 July 2019
Mrs. Maniaci's roses have won the Garden of the Year competition seven years in a row against her neighbours, Mr. Henderson and Jenny. When she has to go to her godson's wedding in Mount Gambier, Maudie and Ezra time a sprinkler to run from 4 to 4:30. When Mrs. Maniaci returns, she chastises Maudie and Ezra for flooding her garden. They arrive at her garden and find the sprinkler set to water for 42 hours; it had run for over 24 hours. Mrs. Maniaci suspects Mr. Henderson and Jenny, but neither was home when Maudie and Ezra calculate that the sprinkler was tampered with: 4:32 pm. After Ava mentions her sleepover with strawberries at Amelia's, Maudie deduces that Amelia did it. Amelia explains that she borrowed strawberries from Mrs. Maniaci's garden, but did not want to get wet; she turned off the sprinkler at 4:32, and was unable to turn it back on. She clicked every button until it turned back on, accidentally setting the timer for 42 hours. Mrs. Maniaci, the Inbestigators and Amelia scoop the water out of the garden, and Mrs. Maniaci wins again.
12	12	"The Case of the Peculiar Pop Quiz"	Nina Buxton	Robyn Butler	2 July 2019
Kelly asks Maudie to tutor her, since she wants to win Mr. Barker's pop quiz; Dayani, Abby, Paul and Xavier always win, except when everyone had a cough. Their group is good at different things: Dayani at sport, Abby at history, Paul at English, and Xavier at maths. In the quiz, one student comes up to answer multi-choice questions; the group with the most points goes to Pancake Palace. Maudie becomes suspicious of the wins, and decides to investigate. Ava and Maudie come into Mr. Barker's class, ostensibly bringing in lunch orders. While Maudie stands in front of Paul, Abby gets the answer wrong. After Maudie takes Dayani's pen, Abby also gets the answer wrong. Maudie concludes that Dayani, Abby, Paul and Xavier cheat, using their unique strengths; Dayani clicks her pen at the right answers, Paul pushes his glasses up, Abby coughs, and Xavier wipes his nose. Mr. Barker resets their points, and emails their parents.
13	13	"The Case of the Science Sabotage"	Robyn Butler	Robyn Butler	3 July 2019
Annie comes to the Inbestigators with a stolen science experiment. Her experiment was to prove that her brother's room was dirtier than hers, using her dad's room as a control; however, her samples of her dad's room were stolen. Maudie, Ezra, Ava and Kyle then go to Annie's science fair, where they meet her assistant Frank (Annie's brother, who has bought three hotdogs for free and lost his lunchbox). Next to Annie's stall are the jealous Jayden and Bella. Maudie deduces that they did not steal Annie's control (since they are jealous), but Jayden said that he came into Annie's stall while looking for the reception area. Two hotdogs, which Frank bought, are found in the bin. Maudie figures that Frank stole Annie's control to replace his own samples; Jayden unexpectedly came into the stall, forcing Frank to hide the samples in his lunchbox (which he hid near the hotdog stall). When he tried to get it, the hotdog stall's owner thought he wanted more hotdogs. Frank apologises and returns the samples to Annie (whose room is found to be cleaner than Frank's), and she places third at the science fair.
14	14	"The Case of the Wrecked Rehearsal"	Wayne Hope	Molly Daniels	4 July 2019
Esther is the lead in the grade-five play, a role Miranda wants to play. Ava, whose role is the director's assistant, constantly pressures the cast and crew to be perfect. Pixie did not paint the set, however, and Esther dances terribly with Diet. Miss Tan finds that fourteen of Esther's relatives (not four) are coming, and the group quickly scurry to get extra chairs. During the bows, Esther claims to have sprained her ankle. Miranda, Pixie and Diet are suspects, due to their proximity to Esther. However, Maudie proves that Esther faked her injury due to nerves. Ava apologises for pressuring her; Esther performs well, and receives a standing ovation.
15	15	"The Case of the Perplexing Painting"	Ian Reiser	Molly Daniels and Jayden Masciulli	5 July 2019
The grade-five classes create art for a display, and Ava sells cookies to raise money for art supplies. Mr. McGillick announces that Esther's painting is one of the winners, but it has a hole in it which was not there five minutes earlier. Maudie deduces that someone threw an object, since everyone was on the other side of the room. They look behind the painting to see if they can find the object, and Caitlin unsuccessfully searches under a chair. Maudie then asks the classes to empty their pockets. When the pockets are emptied, nobody has anything that they could have thrown at the painting. Maudie explains she asked everyone to empty their pockets because she suspected that Caitlin—whose painting was ruined by Esther—threw something, picked it up and hid it in her pocket. Caitlin burps, and Maudie finds icing behind Esther's painting. When Maudie, Ezra, Ava and Kyle rush outside, they find Caitlin speaking to Mr. McGillick. Maudie explains that Caitlin threw a cookie out of anger; when she went behind the painting, she picked up the cookie and ate it under the chair. As punishment, Caitlin must clean the art supplies.
16	16	"The Case of the Turtle Thief"	Nina Buxton	Lisa Marie Corso and Molly Daniels	6 July 2019
While Ava at Her cousins wedding the other three Inbestigators are putting up Inbestigators posters then Kyle notices a poster for a missing turtle. Maudie, Ezra, and Kyle find Ryan, the boy putting up the posters, and offer to help. Ryan tells them that he thinks the thief tipped over the turtle pool he made for Jeffrey (the turtle), took him and his tank, and ran out the back gate. When the Inbestigators meet Paul (who is jealous that Ryan got to look after Jeffrey), they suspect him, and ask to come over to his garden. Going out the back gate, Kyle walks into a large spiderweb which Ezra says could not have been made before Jeffrey's theft. Maudie figures that it must have been an inside job and questions Chloe (Ryan's sister), who dislikes Jeffrey. Chloe says that she did not steal Jeffrey; she only likes his tank, which Ryan brought back in the morning (although school would start the following day). Maudie deduces that Ryan hid Jeffrey; Ryan admits it, because of the other students' poor treatment of the turtle. Ryan returns Jeffrey, and Mr. Barker gives a lesson on how to care for him.
17	17	"The Case of the Misplaced Mug"	Ian Reiser	Maddy and Robyn Butler	7 July 2019
Mr. McGillick loves his "World's Best Principal" mug, and puts folders on top of it so his coffee does not get cold. During pottery class, he returns pottery-wheel instructions to Miss Tan (which she accidentally gave him) and announces that he lost his mug. Miss Tan remembers that Mr. McGillick had it when she gave him permission slips. He recalls that he put his mug on his desk when he went to the playground. The Inbestigators question Mr. Barker and Mrs. Parides, who were in the office. Mr. Barker was in the office to talk about squash, and did not see the mug. Meanwhile, Mrs. Parides was in the office while Miss Tan was looking for the pottery-wheel instructions. Mrs. Parides helped Miss Tan search through piles of paper; when the bell rang, Miss Tan returned to class while Mrs. Parides cleaned up. The Inbestigators find the mug in the recycling bin and explain that when Miss Tan was looking for the permission slips, she unintentionally covered the mug with piles of paper. When Mrs. Parides offered to clean up, she took the papers (and the mug) and put them in the recycling bin.
18	18	"The Case of the Sad Little Sister"	Robyn Butler	Robyn Butler	8 July 2019
When Ezra hears that his sister Poppy is crying in the shelter shed because she lost her hat, he rushes to her. Upset that she cannot play with her friends Violet and Mackenzie, Poppy explains that she last saw her hat on a hook above her bag. She and Mackenzie put away their hats and bags quickly, because they wanted to be Violet's partner during library period. Mackenzie accidentally put her library bag under her school bag, but instead of taking her things off the hook she lined up for library without it. When Miss Ramsay noticed that Mackenzie did not have her library bag, she went back to get it (making her and Violet lose their places in line). Maudie, Ezra and Ava look for Poppy's hat on the hooks. Poppy explains that Violet and Mackenzie cannot come into the shelter shed with her because Violet's rule is that only one friend can play with her. Maudie finds Poppy's hat in Mackenzie's library bag, which she hid while getting her library bag because she was afraid that Violet would choose Poppy to play with her. Ava clarifies that Violet is not Poppy's boss, and returns her hat.
19	19	"The Case of the Disoriented Drone"	Wayne Hope	Molly Daniels	9 July 2019
While testing walkie-talkies, the Inbestigators see a drone belonging to a young girl named Zoya blow away. Seeing her upset, the Inbestigators go to work. Ezra and Zoya monitor the drone's footage while Maudie, Ava and Kyle search for it, communicating with their walkie-talkies. As the drone shuts down, it shows grass and a lawn mower. Since no one leaves a lawn mower out unless they are mowing, Maudie figures that somebody must have been mowing. They meet Angus, who is scratching and covered in grass. Maudie suspects him, but Kyle refutes this. They go to the back of his house and do not see any grass, but his neighbour has a yard; the Inbestigators meet Kate, the neighbour, and investigate her yard. They ask her about lawn mowing, and she says that Angus mows for her because he needs the money. They look over at him, and see him with the drone. He does not give the drone back, and the Inbestigators are forced to tell Zoya the bad news. However, her drone flies over with a note from Angus: he apologises for his greed (due to lack of money), and offers to mow Zoya's lawn.
20	20	"The Case of the Baffling Birthday"	Robyn Butler	Robyn Butler and Wayne Hope	10 July 2019
After Ava hears that Maudie has never had a birthday party, she organises one at the Inbestigators' office with Ezra and Kyle. Maudie's dad, Brian, enters and mentions a conference in Hong Kong which Ava had learned about after visiting Maudie's house. Maudie goes to her house with the Inbestigators and her dad, and they unsuccessfully look for the letter. Brian never opened the letter (which he left on the counter), and Maudie remembers a letter in the freezer which must have gotten stuck on the bottom of the ice-cream tub. Maudie took the envelope out while getting the frozen peas, and the seal became unstuck after being in the freezer. Ava claimed that she dropped her phone in the garden and, while Maudie went to look for it, found it in her pocket and hurriedly left. Maudie deduces that Ava had read the letter and hidden it in a magazine, but doing so is unlike Ava. Maudie reads the letter, which reveals that the investigation was set up as a birthday surprise; to her delight, her friends had also planned a surprise party for her.

=== Series 2 (2019) ===
No. overall	No. in season	Title	Directed by	Written by	Original release date
21	1	"The Case of the Concert Catastrophe"	Robyn Butler	Robyn Butler	11 November 2019
After Ava lets her listen to the January Valentines on her headphones, Maudie becomes obsessed with the girl group. She, Ava, Max and Pixie get tickets to one of their concerts, and Maudie keeps them in her father's desk drawer. On the day of the concert, Maudie mentions that 45,000 people will there, making Max—who dislikes crowds—nervous. After dinner, Maudie, Ava and Pixie go upstairs to get ready while Max finishes eating and then brushes her teeth. When Maudie's father cannot find the tickets in the drawer, he and the girls look around the house for where Maudie (who is devastated) may have misplaced them. After Max mentions that Maudie's desk drawer contains doctors' badges, Maudie figures that she took the tickets; Max hid the tickets in the bathroom (while supposedly brushing her teeth) because she disliked crowds. Maudie's father convinces her that it will be fine, since they are arriving early to avoid crowds.
22	2	"The Case of the Soccer Saga"	Wayne Hope	Robyn Butler and Wayne Hope	12 November 2019
Maudie and Ava record a video of the last soccer match before the finals; Kyle is playing on Team A against Team B. To qualify for the finals, Team B must win the game; Team A has already qualified. Maudie meets Owen (whose arm is injured) and mistakes Evan, his twin, for him. They are distinguished by their shoes and other characteristics: Owen is left-handed and Evan is right-handed, Owen is allergic to eggs and Evan is allergic to shellfish, and Owen is better at football. To everyone's surprise, Team B leads the match. Maudie later sees Owen eating one of Ava's cupcakes; during a timeout, she asks Evan to sign Ava's shirt. When he signs it with his left hand, Maudie concludes that the twins changed places (with Evan faking Owen's injury). She explains that she started to suspect the switch when Evan – disguised as Owen – ate the cupcake (which had eggs). The players apologise to Evan for comparing him with Owen; the twins are banned from the second half of the match, and Team B loses.
23	3	"The Case of the Puzzling Pet Day"	Ian Reiser	Robyn Butler and Lisa Marie Corso	13 November 2019
Miss Tan announces that the animal shelter will audition students and their pets for an advertisement. Amelia talks excitedly about her greyhound, Loopy. The next day, Miranda brings her greyhound (named Cookie because of his taste for them) and repeats everything Amelia had said. Looking at the dog's collar, Maudie finds that the phone number differs from what Miranda had said. During Amelia's audition, she struggles to speak because Miranda had said her material. Cookie refuses to eat a cookie, making Maudie suspect something. She takes Miranda outside, and accuses her of stealing the dog because of her plagiarism of Amelia's words and Cookie's dislike of cookies. Miranda admits this, saying that she only wanted to be in the commercial and the dog belonged to a neighbour. She agrees to withdraw from the audition, and Amelia gets the part.
24	4	"The Case of the Copy Cat"	Nina Buxton	Robyn Butler	14 November 2019
Ava is selected to deliver a speech at the town hall with several other students. She had been writing her speech for eight lessons, one of which was a public holiday. When she gives her speech, a girl named Savannah accuses her of plagiarism. They go outside, and Savannah shows Ava a notebook with a speech identical to Ava's and the dates of each lesson when she wrote it. Ava then accuses Savannah of plagiarising her speech, since Ava left her tablet next to Savannah twice while retrieving her printed speech. When Maudie asks why Ava left twice, she explains that the speech was not printed the first time. However, Savannah says that she was assisting another girl in the bathroom. After another look at the notebook, Maudie deduces Savannah was the plagiariser; one of the dates in her notebook was the public holiday (on which she did not write her speech). She explains that Ava's first attempt to print her speech did not fail; Savannah retrieved it.
25	5	"The Case of the Rosemary Riddle"	Ian Reiser	Robyn Butler and Wayne Hope	15 November 2019
Ezra is grumpy when his visiting nana interrupts his detective work and does not leave him alone. On her last day, Nana invites him, Maudie, Ava and Kyle to the market. When they arrive, Ezra's nana shows them her shopping list, which she calls her "secret code" and includes meat, rosemary (her name) and thyme (which Kyle mistakes for the word "time"). Rosemary explains that the rosemary must be added before the thyme. On her list are also jam donuts; to get perfect jam donuts, she says, the children should meet her at the truck at 12:00. Rosemary suddenly goes missing, and Maudie suspects that she concocted a mystery to make up for her interruptions. The market workers give them the items on the shopping list, except for the jam donuts. Maudie sorts the items, and they deduce that "meat" means "meet"; "rosemary" is Nana, and "thyme" means "time"; the riddle says "meet Rosemary on time" at the jam-donut truck. Kyle tells them that it is almost 12:00; they find Rosemary at the truck and are surprised with special, letter-shaped jam donuts.
26	6	"The Case of the Robot Robbery"	Robyn Butler	Robyn Butler	16 November 2019
On Science and Technology Dress-up Day, Patrick's robot costume is stolen after he takes it off to use the bathroom; he sees a person dressed as a mad professor steal it when he dropped his magnets. He brings the case to the Inbestigators, who ask him for more information because many people are dressed as the character. Patrick remembers that the professor had red shoes, which narrows down the suspects to three people: Pixie, Mario and Duncan. Pixie has no idea what they are talking about, and Mario and Duncan say that they did not see Patrick in the costume. Retracing the route the thief must have taken, Maudie encounters a blocked-off section and finds the robot costume; however, the magnets are missing. Borrowing Ava's metal necklace, Maudie puts it against Duncan's pocket and reveals that he has the magnets. Duncan was jealous of Patrick's costume, and stole it to win house points which Mr. Barker promised to the best costume.
27	7	"The Case of the Vanishing Koalas"	Robyn Butler	Robyn Butler, Maddy Butler, Lisa Marie Corso and Molly Daniels	17 November 2019
When Miss Tan finds Kakow Koalas (a popular snack), James asks for his. Several students offer valuable things for them, and Mario mocks James. Miss Tan finds a roll of toilet paper, and Charlotte gives Kakow Koalas to other girls. Mario fights James for allegedly stealing his Koalas, and the Inbestigators ask who was near Mario's backpack. Archie was nearby, but could not have taken them because his hands were full. Pixie and Charlotte were going to the toilet, past the backpack. The Inbestigators find Charlotte showing off her gymnastics skills; she is confident, and often jumps off high bars. Pixie was chatting, while braiding her hair. Maudie says that they need to go to the toilet and races to where Miss Tan found the toilet paper, concluding that Charlotte took the Kakow Koalas. Maudie explains that she jumped out the toilet window, knocked a toilet roll, went around to Mario's bag, and climbed the bin back to the toilet. Charlotte, lonely after missing classes for gymnastics and seeing the others crazy about them, thought she could make friends with the Koalas. Pixie tells Charlotte that Kakow Koalas are not needed for friends, and Charlotte apologises to Mario.
28	8	"The Case of the Extremely Empty Freezer"	Wayne Hope	Maddy Butler and Lisa Marie Corso	18 November 2019
Mr. Barker is lovesick when his girlfriend moves to England, and Ava plans a 1980s-themed birthday party for him. Kyle buys a Rubik's Cube-shaped ice cream cake, which he puts in the staff-room freezer. Mr. Barker forgets his lovesickness at the party. When Maudie, Ava and Ezra go to retrieve the cake, they only see Miss Tan's blueberries, Mr. McGillick's shrimp and Mrs. Parides's ice packs; all three say that they did not see the cake when they were at the freezer. They ask Kyle where he put the cake, and he shows them the cake box; Maudie tells him that he accidentally put the cake in the refrigerator, where it melted. Kyle apologises, saying that his refrigerator is on the opposite side from theirs. They turn the cake into a Rubik's Cube drink, and everyone enjoys it.
29	9	"The Case of the Miraculous Mini Golfer"	Tim Bartley	Robyn Butler and Wayne Hope	19 November 2019
After promising $20 to anyone who can complete a mini-golf course in 20 strokes, Charlie begins losing money from Lexy's work and almost gets fired. Convinced that she is cheating, Charlie hires the Inbestigators; they observe the course, and see how many putts a person took at each hole. They find that Lexy had few strokes at most holes, but may at the last hole (the easiest). Kyle explains that after the last hole, the ball is returned to the mini-golf park's owner. While Ezra and Kyle stall Lexy, Maudie and Ava observe the park's security cameras. The day before she won, Lexy was a terrible. They see her put something in the hole, and Maudie realises that the plastic at the bottom of the mini-golf hole does not make the sound she hears. She figures that Lexy is cheating by putting metal at the bottom of the holes and using a magnet ball; Lexy could not use her magnet ball on the last hole, and Maudie proves this by replacing her ball.
30	10	"The Case of the Problematic Party"	Tim Bartley	Molly Daniels and Jayden Masciulli	20 November 2019
Toby's birthday invitations for laser tag are distributed to the entire class, although he only invited five people (one of whom is Kyle). He did not invite Diet, his best friend, because his parents would not let him invite anyone who did not invite him to their party. Toby gets sick while the Inbestigators take the case. Maudie suspects Diet because he may have felt left out, but Toby says that he did not tell anyone. When they learn that Kyle accidentally told Ruby and Max about the party, the Inbestigators question them. Ruby had tried to use the photocopier, but Mr. McGillick was copying something for an hour. The Inbestigators suspect Max, since she was at the printer, but it had run out of ink. Kyle later says that he dropped his invitation during karate. After trying to figure out why someone would copy the invitations, Maudie deduces that Diet (who had gone to the library) found Kyle's invitation and copied it there. Diet apologises to Toby for making him sick, and Toby's parents invite him as well.
31	11	"The Case of the Lousy Lunch Orders"	Ian Reiser	Molly Daniels	21 November 2019
Mrs. Parides and sports captains Kyle and Dayani announce a healthy-eating challenge; winning will result in a new basketball stadium. Everyone eats healthy every day except Friday, when they have unhealthy lunch orders. When Ezra finds his order replaced with healthy food, he is angry. Ezra questions lunch-order monitors Pixie and Ava, who deny interference but saw Kyle near the orders. He does not know what they are talking about, but says that he saw Dayani at sickbay. They question Dayani, who complains about the mixup and puts her lunch bag in the bin. She says that Mrs. Parides was printing something near the orders; Ezra and Maudie question her, and Mrs. Parides says that she was printing Greek recipes for her husband. Maudie concludes that Dayani is the culprit, since she wanted to win the basketball stadium. Dayani stuck labels on the lunch orders while she was at sickbay, and left when Mrs. Parides was too absorbed in her printing to notice. Maudie finds proof, since Dayani's lunch-order bag does not have a label. Dayani apologises, and they do not win the challenge.
32	12	"The Case of the Interrupting Intern"	Ian Reiser	Molly Daniels	22 November 2019
Elijah, the Inbestigators' intern, comes along to help solve the case of Amelia's missing mountain bike. Maudie suggests that they ask the neighbours, but Elijah notices a mountain-bike track. They follow the track to Dana's house, where Elijah finds the bike in the bushes. The other Inbestigators are impressed, but Maudie is not. Elijah asks Dana, who shouts an apology. Maudie remains behind while Elijah and the other Inbestigators get ice cream, and announces her resignation the next day. The other Inbestigators ask why, and Maudie says that they replaced her with Elijah. They deny this, but she says that they listened to him instead of her and called him "Maudie 2.0". Maudie says that Elijah faked the case and apology; he apologises, saying that he only wanted to be part of the Inbestigators. Maudie rejoins the team, which celebrates her return.
33	13	"The Case of the Freaky Frequency"	Ian Reiser	Bob Franklin, Molly Daniels and Robyn Butler	23 November 2019
Mrs. Maniaci asks Ezra to fix her doorbell after some children pranked her. He and the Inbestigators decide to get ice cream from a store which is going out of business because customers cannot lock their cars there. The Inbestigators decide to investigate, and mark the locations where cars cannot lock. They figure out that it has something to do with radio disruption, and look for something in the centre of the locations: Mrs Maniaci's doorbell. Ezra fixes the doorbell, and the car locks begin working again.
34	14	"The Case of the Tricky Trimathalon"	Robyn Butler and Wayne Hope	Maddy Butler and Jayden Masciulli	24 November 2019
Kyle accidentally signs up for a trimathlon, thinking that it is a triathlon. Miss Tan will not let him cancel his registration, and pairs him and Ezra against talented maths students. Kyle does poorly in his studies, so Ezra makes him a cheat sheet with his erasable pen. He does well in the first round with his cheat sheet, and Kyle and Ezra move on to the next round with James and Ruby. During their next study session, Ezra and Kyle goof off. They go to get lunch; James pressures Ruby to study harder, and refuses to make a cheat sheet. Mr. Barker finds 100 sheets of blank paper at the photocopier when everyone returns, and Kyle's cheat sheet is blank. Ezra asks if it is Kyle's cheat sheet; Maudie confirms that it is, and suspects that someone put it somewhere hot. Ruby admits putting it in the photocopier to make her own, but accidentally made 100 copies when Ava and Maudie startled her. The photocopier was hot, erasing the ink on the sheet and forcing Kyle to complete the second round without it. To everyone's surprise, Kyle and Ezra win.
35	15	"The Case of the Burgled Bags"	Robyn Butler	Robyn Butler	25 November 2019
Sadie accuses Gary of stealing bags, since he was the only person around at the time. Kyle is angry because Gary is his favourite crossing guard since kindergarten who he consider as a friend . Maudie asks Sadie what was in her bag; she says that it contained lipstick and a bacon sandwich. As Mr. McGillick, Gary and Sadie head for the principal's office, Maudie asks Gary if he took his dog Barney to the beach; Sadie mentioned that the dog had wet sand on his paws. When Gary says no, Maudie concludes that Barney stole the bags and buried them near the sandy fish pond as a game. Sadie apologises for her accusations, and gives Maudie a voucher for the sports store where she works.
36	16	"The Case of the Distracted Detective"	Tim Bartley	Robyn Butler and Maddy Butler	26 November 2019
The Inbestigators are nominated for a Young Small Business Award (for people under 16 who have started a company) with Jordan (who has started a jam company) and Harriet, who works in website design. To win the award, they have to prepare a presentation. During the rehearsals, Ezra becomes increasingly distracted while reading his tablet. Ava gives him a pep talk, and restores his concentration. At the event they meet Harriet (a fan, but surprised to see them) and Jordan, who is unimpressed. While Jordan presents, the Inbestigators notice that Ezra is missing. They find him in the library, reading his tablet; Maudie takes a look, and discovers that he is being cyberbullied. Maudie notices that the cyberbullying when the nominees for the Young Small Business Award were announced, and the comments are from the same person. The Inbestigators suspect another Jordan of the bullying, but he did not know who the Inbestigators were until the presentation day. Maudie calls Harriet the culprit, since she was surprised to see the Inbestigators turn up. Harriet is disqualified from the competition, and the Inbestigators win the award.
37	17	"The Case of the Fishy Fundraiser"	Nina Buxton	Lisa Marie Corso and Molly Daniels	27 November 2019
After Amelia opens a stall to sell cupcakes for the hospital (the other children say that her cupcakes taste like "chocolate glue"), Toby opens a lemonade stand next to her. Amelia resents this, especially after Toby's stand has better sales than hers. While buying lemonade, James criticises Toby for being unable to play cricket. When Toby runs out of lemonade, James follows him to make more and Amelia is caught trying to move Toby's jugs. After Toby returns, the lemonade tastes disgusting and people go to Amelia's stall to get the taste out of their mouths. The Inbestigators suspect Amelia of tampering with Toby's jugs but she denies this, saying that she was trying to move them so he could not sell his lemonade. They then talk to James, who says that he went to apologise to Toby for his rude behaviour. At the house, Toby's father scolds him for not helping him cut up ingredients for curry. Maudie figures out that Toby's lemons were cut on the same chopping board as his father's curry ingredients, making the lemonade taste bad. Amelia apologises for her resentment, and she and Toby raise money for the hospital.
38	18	"The Case of the Incredible Fortune Teller"	Tim Bartley	Robyn Butler, Maddy Butler and Lisa Marie Corso	28 November 2019
Grade-six student Ramona does not know what to do for a fundraiser, so Ezra suggests a fortune telling stall. Ava says that she cannot do it, however, since only people with "the gift" can tell fortunes. After everyone goes to see Mr. Barker's dog, Ramona proves to Ava that she has "the gift" by predicting the tightening of her braces. Ava allows Ramona to have a fortune-telling stall, but Ezra does not believe that she can actually tell fortunes. Ramona correctly predicts a future event, but Ezra doubts her ability and sends Kyle to try; she predicts that his brother will win a million dollars, but Kyle does not have a brother. Ava and Ezra try again, but Ramona is missing; she returns, saying that her tablet's battery ran down. She makes another correct prediction, winning Ezra over. Ava does not believe her, however, because she predicted a cancelled event. Maudie explains that while everyone was looking at Mr. Barker's dog, Ramona took photos of Ava's calendar (and its events); the only times she got predictions wrong was with Kyle (when her tablet's battery ran down) and Ava's cancelled trip, which had not been deleted from her calendar.
39	19	"The Case of the Unhappy Camper"	Robyn Butler	Robyn Butler, Maddy Butler and Lisa Marie Corso	29 November 2019
At the grade-five camp, Kyle plays a number of pranks; when Mr. McGillick's phone is found in a tub of rice and no longer works, Kyle is accused of tampering with it. Maudie, Ezra and Ava discuss the mystery and conclude that it is unlikely that Kyle is to blame; his pranks are designed to make people laugh, not damage things. Ava remembers that Mr. Barker told the students that putting a phone in rice would make it work after it gets wet, but Kyle would not have known this. Maudie, Ezra and Ava recreate the scene: Ava and Archive were folding napkins, Kyle was under the teachers' table, and Justin and James were playing outside. Archie went to check on them; when he did not return, Ava went and saw Justin and James playing and Archie washing his hands at the sink. Maudie tells Kyle what happened. Archie took the phone to call his parents because Kyle had teased him about his sickness during sleepovers, and when Ava came he dropped the phone in the sink. He put it in a tub of rice, but the phone did not work. Kyle finds Archie confessing to Mr. McGillick, and apologises to Archie for his insensitivity.
40	20	"The Case of the Triple Inbestigation"	Wayne Hope	Robyn Butler	30 November 2019
The Inbestigators are going to film an advertisement starring Neil Armstrong, Ezra's goldfish, but he goes missing. Ava remembers that she saw Poppy outside the Inbestigators' office with a red bucket while she and Amelia moved the bin. Maudie and Ezra question her; she says she was finger painting, and shows them a paper with paw prints and stains on her fingers. Ava recalls that she saw Neil; Amelia expressed her desire to give him a bigger bowl while Ezra's mum Sarah came in after drying her hair and his dad was vacuuming. They question Sarah, who said that she was looking for her ruby earring. Maudie concludes that Poppy was not finger painting, but playing with ink with her puppy toy. When she saw the ink on his paws, she put him in the red bucket to hide him. Sarah's earring was vacuumed up by her husband, although she later finds it. Neil was put in the bathtub by Amelia, who apologises and says that she meant to tell Ava. The Inbestigators praise Maudie for solving the case, and film the advertisement.

== Release ==
Each episode of The Inbestigators is approximately 15 minutes long. The series premiered on ABC Me in Australia and New Zealand on 21 June 2019. The first series' broadcast ended on 10 July 2019. It was renewed for a second series on 12 August, which was broadcast from 11 November to 30 November 2019. The first and second series were released worldwide on Netflix on 9 August 2019 and 10 January 2020 respectively. On the streaming service, episodes are presented in pairs, totalling 30 minutes each.

It premiered on WildBrainTV in Canada on March 10, 2022.

== Reception ==
=== Critical response ===
The Inbestigators has received critical acclaim. The show has been listed as one of Netflix's best Australian, detective, educational, and children's series by Screen Rant, The Cinemaholic, Variety and Stuff respectively.

The show's comical aspects attracted praise. Reviewers found the series "hilarious" and "genuinely funny". Decider's Joel Keller said "[i]t's got a sharp sense of humour with a lot of gentle snarkiness". He and Common Sense Media writer Mandie Caroll argued adults would enjoy The Inbestigators due to its comical aspects. In addition, critics thought the Australian actors had a natural approach to comedy. Caroll described their line deliveries as "often dripping with kid-friendly sarcasm and good-natured humour"; Keller assured that the show would be of lower quality with British or American actors. Additionally, reviewers lauded the racial diversity.

Journalists have had mixed opinions on the characters. They deemed the characters stereotypical; critics believed they matched tropes such as the geek and the jock. Despite this, Mumtaj Begum of The Star stated the show's writing and liveliness made such stereotypes less irritating. Aside from the clichés, Carrol considered the characters "[l]ikeable, interesting ... [and] role-model worthy". She also said the show subverted gender stereotypes.

=== Awards and nominations ===
Awards and nominations received by The Inbestigators
Award	Year	Category	Nominee(s)	Result	Ref.
AACTA Awards	2019	Best Children's Program	Robyn Butler and Wayne Hope	Nominated	
AACTA Awards	2020	Best Children's Program	Robyn Butler and Wayne Hope	Nominated	
ATOM Awards	2020	Best Children's Television Program	The Inbestigators	Finalist	
Casting Guild of Australia Awards	2020	Achievement in Casting	Nathan Lloyd	Won	

== Other media ==
The InBESTigators: Crime Crack, a short web series, was released on ABC Me's YouTube channel. The series, starring Abby Bergman as Ava Andrikides and Anna Cooke as Maudie Miller, recounts each episode in six steps: the crime, the red herrings, the culprit, the clues, the motive and the moral of the story. Two episodes were released on 18 July 2019, based on the first series' second and fifth episodes.

On 13 September 2019, a cast Q&A webinar for primary-school students was announced by the Australian Children's Television Foundation; the webinar premiered on 22 November 2019. Schools in Queensland, New South Wales, South Australia and Victoria participated in the Q&A, which featured cast members Anna Cooke, Abby Bergman, Aston Droomer and Jamil Smyth-Secka. It was released on YouTube on 18 December 2019. A study guide, The InBESTigators Teaching Toolkit, was released in May 2020 during the COVID-19 pandemic.
