= Molly Daniels =

Australian actress

- Born: Melbourne
- Education: Swinburne University
- Occupations: Actress, writer, director, producer
- Years active: 2004–present
- Known for: You're Skitting Me; Tomorrow When the War Began; Ronny Chieng: International Student
- Notable work: The InBESTigators
- Parent(s): Robyn Butler (mother); Wayne Hope (stepfather)

Molly Daniels is an Australian actress, writer, director, and producer. She is best known for her roles in You're Skitting Me, Tomorrow When the War Began, Ronny Chieng: International Student, and Very Small Business. She is also a co-host on the ABC children's podcast Short and Curly.

== Early life and education ==
Molly Daniels was born and raised in Melbourne, Australia. Her parents are actors and filmmakers Robyn Butler and Wayne Hope; Hope is her step-father.

After graduating from high school, she studied film and television at Swinburne University in 2014. She studied at the IO Theater in Chicago, US.

== Career ==
Daniels began her acting career in 2004, when she played a flower girl in the SBS comedy series Stories from the Golf.

In 2008, she played Sam Angel in the comedy series Very Small Business, reprising the role in 2018. From 2012-2013, she was a performer as well as writer and director on the Australian children's sketch comedy show You're Skitting Me.

In 2016, she played the lead role of Ellie in Tomorrow When the War Began. For this role, she undertook stunt and firearms training.

She portrayed one of the main characters, Asher, in the ABC series Ronny Chieng: International Student.

She wrote for The InBESTigators, an Australian mockumentary children's television series that focuses on themes of friendship, responsibility, and teamwork. She was also co-host and writer on the ABC children's podcast Short & Curly.

Daniels worked as a producer and director on the 2016 web series Double Date Night. The web series was about a pair of best friends, Vic and Riley, who went on double dates every Wednesday.

== Filmography ==
=== Actor ===
Year	Title	Role	Director	Production	Notes
2004	Stories from the Golf	Flower girl	Wayne Hope	SBS	Episode: "Jitterbug"
2007-2010	The Librarians	Bridget/Bernadette	Wayne Hope & Tony Martin	ABC TV	Episode: "4 Kilos to Book Week"
2008-2018	Very Small Business	Sam Angel	Diana Reid	ABC TV	11 episodes
2009–2010	The Librarians	Bridget; Bernadette	Wayne Hope & Tony Martin	ABC TV	3 episodes: "My Rock", "Romeos and Juliets", "Kerching Kerching"
2012–2013	You're Skitting Me	Various	Dave Cartell & David Swan & Peter Lawler & Corrdell Jigsaw	ABC 3	Main cast (26 episodes) from episode 1.1 to episode 2.13. Also writer and director
2014	Party Tricks	Andie	Kate Dennis	Network TEN	Episode: "The Meeting"
2015	Young Love	Hannah	Molly Daniels & Nicholas Davey-Greene	Blunder Bus Productions	Episode: "The Captains"
2015	Comedy Showroom: Ronny Chieng: International Student (Pilot)	Asher	Jonathan Brough	Sticky Pictures Pty Ltd	
2016	Double Date Night	Riley	Molly Daniels	Yung Victoria	6 episodes: episode 1.1 to 1.6. Also editor
2016	Tomorrow When the War Began	Ellie Linton	Bendan Maher	Tomorrow When The War Began Skagos Series 1 Pty Ltd 2016	Lead role (6 episodes)
2016	Upper Middle Bogan	Ashley	Wayne Hope	Upper Middle Bogan Series 3 Pty Ltd	2 episodes: "Sticking to your principals", "Sons of Anarchy". Also contributing lyricist
2017	The Doctor Blake Mysteries (Series 5)	Sally Murphy	Diana Reid	January Productions Pty Ltd	Episode:"First Dance"
2017	The Y2K Bug (web series)	Essie	Molly Daniels	Yung Victoria	1 episode: "High School River". Also script consultant
2017	Ronny Chieng: International Student (Series 1)	Asher	Jonathan Brough	Sticky Pictures Pty Ltd	6 episodes
2017	Get Krack!n	Megan Tech guru	Hayden Guppy	Guesswork Television	1 episode: episode 1.4
2017	The Housemate	Molly B	Hayden Mustica		Episode: "Teaser Trailer"
2018	Talkin' 'bout your Generation	Guest	Jon Olb	Network Nine	
2018	Shaun Micallef's Mad as Hell (Series 9)	Various	Jon Olb	ITV Studios Australia Pty Ltd	11 episodes
2019	Feedback (web series)	Ella	Dylan Murphy	Best Fort Productions	Episode: "Playing"
2021	Party of the Century	Molly	Molly Daniels		7 episodes
2021	Celebration Nation	Shay	Jess Harris		6 episodes. Also creator, writer and producer
2021	Funeral of the Century	Molly	Molly Daniels		7 episodes

=== Writer ===
Year	Title	Episodes/ Description	Identification
2015	Short & Curly	81 episodes. Also co-host	Podcast
2015	Young Love	8 episodes	TV series
2016	Double Date Night	6 episodes	TV series
2017	The Y2K Bug	1 episode: City Cop: Murder Unit	TV series
2019	The InBESTigators	12 episodes & 20 episodes as a staff writer	TV series

== Awards and recognition ==
In 2021, she was nominated for the AACTA award Best Short Form Comedy for Celebration Nation, alongside Jenny Zhou and Gaby Seow.
