= Little Lunch (TV series) =

Australian mockumentary series

- Genre: Family; Comedy
- Created by: Wayne Hope; Robyn Butler
- Starring: Flynn Curry; Joshua Sitch; Madison Lu; Faith Seci; Olivia Deeble; Oisín O'Leary; Heidi Arena
- Country of origin: Australia
- Original language: English
- No. of seasons: 1
- No. of episodes: 26 (plus 2 specials)

Production
- Executive producer: Bernadette O'Mahoney
- Producers: Robyn Butler; Wayne Hope
- Running time: 12 minutes (main episodes); 22 minutes (The Halloween Horror Story); 24 minutes (The Nightmare Before Graduation)
- Production company: Gristmill Productions

Original release
- Network: ABC Me
- Release: 20 July 2015 – 23 December 2016

Little Lunch is an Australian children's mockumentary television series that first aired on ABC Me in 2015. The 26-part, 12 minute series is based on the books written by Danny Katz and illustrated by Mitch Vane. The series was adapted for television by Robyn Butler and Wayne Hope. The stories are set in the primary school playground at snack time and unfold through six children whose names are Atticus, Debra Jo, Rory, Melanie, Tamara and Battie as well as their teacher Mrs. Gonsha.

Two additional specials were filmed and screened in 2016: "The Halloween Horror Story" and "The Nightmare Before Graduation". The series was filmed at St Kilda Primary School in Melbourne, Australia.

In February 2026, it was announced the series will return in 2027 which will include new students Adelaide, Ivy, Mason, Steve, Bonnie and Arthur with Heidi Arena reprising her role as Mrs Gonsha, it will be titled Little Lunch: New Class.

== Main plot ==
Little Lunch is set in a suburban primary school in Australia and follows the adventures of six Grade 5 students (listed below). In each episode, set at little lunch (or morning recess), the children tell stories about a scenario that happened at little lunch or events that happened outside class for example, a walk-a-thon, two pupils competing for who gets to go on the monkey bars or celebrating a birthday.

== Cast and characters ==
- Flynn Curry as Rory: A naughty, distracted and very likeable student who is friends with Atticus.
- Joshua Sitch as Atticus Busby: A sweet and nerdy student who is always hungry. He is friends with Rory, but can get frustrated with his antics.
- Madison Lu as Melanie Woo: Stubborn, morally courageous, and shy
- Faith Seci as Debra-Jo: Smart, ambitious and organised, though some may call her bossy
- Olivia Deeble as Tamara Noodle: Excellent at sports and is not afraid to remind everyone
- Oisín O'Leary as Battie: The gentle, creative, daydreamer who is afraid of dogs and speaks with an Irish accent
- Heidi Arena as Mrs. Gonsha: Extremely patient and has a tendency to nod off in class
- Charlie Van Poelvoorde as Max, Elsa’s brother and a “weird twin”
- Jack Van Poelvoorde as Elsa, Max’s brother and a “weird twin”

== Episodes ==
No. in Season	Title	Directed by	Written by	Original release date
1	"The Principal's Office"	Wayne Hope	Robyn Butler	20 July 2015
When Rory is punished and sent to the Principal's office, the other kids surprisingly feel sorry for him and try to cheer him up.
2	"The Dress Up Day"	Wayne Hope	Robyn Butler	21 July 2015
On Dress-Up-As-What-You-Want-To-Be-When-You-Grow-Up-Day, Battie dresses up as Stretcho, his very own made-up super hero.
3	"The Ya-Ya"	Wayne Hope	Robyn Butler & Wayne Hope	22 July 2015
The children discuss that Atticus has been acting strangely all week and that it might have something to do with his parents going away. Atticus confesses that he is upset because he is starving.
4	"The Monkey Bars"	Wayne Hope	Robyn Butler	23 July 2015
Tamara is very good on the monkey bars since she uses them every day, but Melanie is not as good because Tamara never lets her on them. When Melanie demands a proper turn, Tamara is outraged and so a battle of wills begins.
5	"The Top of the Fireman's Pole"	Wayne Hope	Robyn Butler	24 July 2015
After Mrs Gonsha bravely rescues a tiny boy from the top of the playground equipment, she can't get down herself. The children realise that Mrs Gonsha isn't stuck, but too scared to move as she's terrified of heights...
6	"The Lost and Found Box"	Wayne Hope	Robyn Butler	27 July 2015
After Debra-Jo loses her glasses the children take her to the Lost and Found box to look for them, where they discover all their own long-lost belongings.
7	"The Milk Bar"	Tim Bartley	Robyn Butler & Trent Roberts	28 July 2015
Rory has forgotten his lunch, again, and the other children have had enough. They refuse to give him any more of their food. Rory is starving and, in desperation, decides to go to the milk bar.
8	"The Girls' Toilets"	Erin White	Robyn Butler & Danny Katz	29 July 2015
Debra-Jo and Tamara each enter the school talent quest but discover to their horror that they are performing the same song. Scared of being outdone by the other, they ask Melanie to choose who will be better.
9	"The Kiss-Chasey Oval"	Wayne Hope	Danny Katz	30 July 2015
Tamara unexpectedly wants to play kiss chasey but the only person she wants to chase and kiss is Battie. When Battie refuses to play, Tamara tries to find a different way to get his attention.
10	"The Thing In The Sand"	Erin White	Robyn Butler	31 July 2015
Melanie thinks she discovers a possum's head in the sand pit, and refuses to believe that it's actually Rory's craft project made out of a pine-cone and toilet paper.
11	"The Band"	Tim Bartley	Robyn Butler & Tegan Higginbotham	3 August 2015
Bored during a rainy little lunch, Atticus starts a band and makes Battie reluctantly join in too. Meanwhile, Rory struggles staying in charge of the classroom as he is desperate for the loo.
12	"The Beep Test"	Tim Bartley	Robyn Butler, Kate McCartney & Kate McLennan	4 August 2015
Debra-Jo can't understand how Tamara's favourite day of the year could be when the class does the beep test fitness assessment. On beep test day, Tamara is very excited, but after she sprains her ankle she can’t join in.
13	"The Joke Competition"	Wayne Hope	Danny Katz	5 August 2015
On a very hot day, Atticus decides to distract everyone with a joke-telling competition. While everyone takes turns to tell a joke, Melanie panics at the thought of getting up in front of everyone.
14	"The Old Climbing Tree"	Erin White	Danny Katz	6 August 2015
Battie loves the old climbing tree in the playground where he goes to sit and think. Debra-Jo thinks it's dangerous and should be chopped down. The children are divided and form camps to embark on a campaign to get their way.
15	"The Oval"	Ian Reiser	Kate McLennan	7 August 2015
Most days, Rory kicks the ball over the fence, hits the council windows and is promptly sent to sit in the Principals office. Today, he is trying very hard not to do that, by kicking the ball to the other kids instead.
16	"The Pavlova"	Erin White	Robyn Butler	10 August 2015
For the birthday party of Max and Elsa, the "weird twins", Mrs Gonsha makes a pavlova, which looks delicious, but is the most disgusting thing the children have ever eaten.
17	"The Germblock"	Erin White	Robyn Butler	11 August 2015
Melanie is very upset when Tamara 'germblocks' Melanie, the rule that forces someone to be isolated if they have done something disgusting. Tamara has accused Melanie of not washing her hands after going to the toilet.
18	"The Grandparents Day"	Ian Reiser	Robyn Butler & Tim Potter	12 August 2015
After last year's Grandparent's Day was a disaster, Mrs Gonsha is determined to make this year's celebration a great success. She has asked Battie's grandfather, a renowned inventor, to be the guest of honour.
19	"The Cake Stall"	Ian Reiser	Robyn Butler & Danny Katz	13 August 2015
When Melanie decides to have a cake stall to raise money for homeless puppies, she asks Debra-Jo and Tamara for help. After Mrs Gonsha rewards the girls, Atticus gets jealous and sets up a rival fundraiser.
20	"The Walk-A-Thon"	Erin White	Trent Roberts	14 August 2015
The children face the difficult task of finding the right partner to be their walking buddy for the walk-a-thon. Tamara is determined to find the best companion who will assist her in doing the most laps.
21	"The Windy Day"	Erin White	Roz Hammond & Bob Franklin	17 August 2015
During a very windy little lunch, Mrs Gonsha insists the class comes inside and does yoga, much to Debra-Jo's horror.
22	"The Body Bus"	Erin White	Robyn Butler	18 August 2015
After the kids see a health van parked in the playground, rumours fly about what it's doing there. Debra-Jo begins to act very strangely, and tries to create reasons for her to suddenly leave school.
23	"The Election"	Ian Reiser	Danny Katz	19 August 2015
When Rory announces that he wants to be the Prime Minister, Mrs Gonsha suggests that they have their own election. Debra-Jo runs against Rory, and Tamara joins the campaign trail too.
24	"The Corridor Outside 6E"	Bob Franklin	Danny Katz	20 August 2015
When Max and Elsa suddenly leave class without a note, everyone speculates as to why they disappeared. Before long, a ridiculous rumour chain is circulating.
25	"The Gap Behind The Dumpster"	Tim Bartley	Robyn Butler & Danny Katz	21 August 2015
Atticus decides to start a secret club with Rory, but after Rory invites everyone else to join, Atticus gets cross.
26	"The Relationship"	Bob Franklin	Robyn Butler & Trent Roberts	24 August 2015
Rory is bewildered and confused when he finds out a grade six girl likes him and Debra-Jo can't understand why she feels so cross about it.

== International broadcasts ==
This show airs in the United States on Universal Kids and in Canada on TVO. The first season is still available on Netflix in the UK, and in addition premiered on CBBC and BBC iPlayer on September 14, 2025. However, Netflix in the United States only had the series from November 1, 2015 until March 15, 2020, but was brought back on April 1, 2025.

Currently, Little Lunch can be viewed airing on BYUtv, the Provo Utah based family television channel. It is also available on demand on the BYUtv website, BYUtv.org.

== Home media ==
A two-disc DVD (PAL, Region 4) collection of the 26 episodes was published by the Australian Children's Television Foundation in 2017. The series and two specials were available for digital download from ACTF.

== Novelisations ==
In addition to the original series of books, Katz and Vane also wrote and illustrated a number of novelisations, themselves based on specific episodes of the TV series. The novelisations were published in collections of three by Black Dog Books, an imprint of Walker Books. Each collection included a handful of greyscale stills from the series.

- Episodes 7, 18 and 19 were novelised in Triple the Treats (2016).
- Episodes 22, 11 and 9 were novelised in Triple the Trouble (2017).
- Episodes 3, 2 and 17 were novelised in Triple the Laughs (2017).
- Episodes 20, 23 and 8 were novelised in Triple the Games (2018).

== See also ==
- The Inbestigators
