= Wayne Hope =

Australian actor, writer, director, and producer

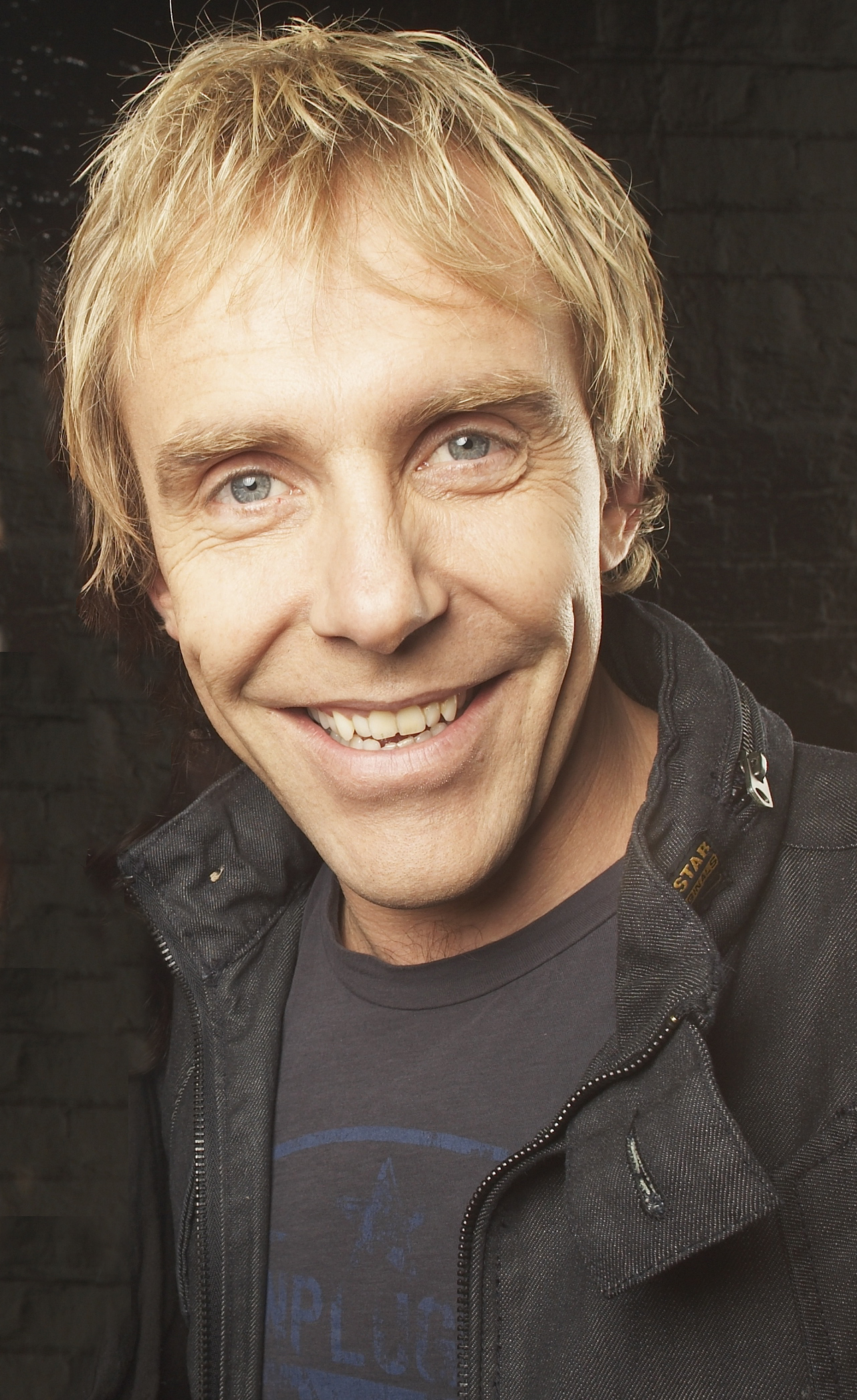
- Born: Wayne Hope; 1969 (age 56–57); Australia
- Occupations: Actor, Writer, Producer, Director
- Years active: 1996–present
- Spouse: Robyn Butler
- Children: Molly Daniels
- Website: www.gristmill.com.au

Wayne Hope is an Australian actor, writer, director, and producer. He is known for co-creating, with his wife Robyn Butler, several TV series, including Very Small Business, Upper Middle Bogan, and Summer Love.

== Career ==
Hope's acting career began in 1996, when he appeared on The Glynn Nicholas Show.

He has co-created many series with his wife Robyn Butler, including Very Small Business, The Librarians (2007-2010), Upper Middle Bogan (2013–2016), and Summer Love (2022).

In 2025, Butler and Hope created, wrote and directed the Stan Original series Dear Life, which premiered on the platform on 1 January 2026.

== Personal life ==
Hope is married to actor and filmmaker Robyn Butler, with whom he runs the production company Gristmill.

Writer, director, and actor Molly Daniels is the daughter of Butler and step-daughter of Hope.

== Filmography ==
=== Film ===
Year	Title	Role	Type
1997	The Castle	Wayne Kerrigan	Feature film
2006	BoyTown	Carl	Feature film
2007	BoyTown Confidential	Carl	Feature film

=== Television ===
Year	Title	Role	Type
1996	The Glynn Nicholas Show		TV series
	The Adventures of Lano and Woodley	Guest role	TV series, 1 episode
1998-2001	The Micallef Program		TV series
2002	Halifax f.p.		TV series, Season 6 episode 3: “Takes Two”
2003	CrashBurn	Phillip	TV series
2004	Stories from the Golf	Anton	TV series
2006-08	Stupid, Stupid Man	Carl van Dyke	TV series
2007-10	The Librarians	Terry O’Brien	TV series
2008	Very Small Business	Don Angel / Marcus Goode / James White / Haydn King / Kerry Akermanis / Pete Mandela	TV series
2018	Back in Very Small Business		TV series
2020	Love in Lockdown	Josh	TV series, 1 episode
2020	Drunk History Australia	Alexander Pierce	TV series, 1 episode
2022	Summer Love	Eddy	TV series, episode 4
2024	Colin from Accounts	Director	3 episodes
2026	Dear Life	Writer, director	Stan Original; 6 episodes

=== Crew ===
Year	Title	Role	Type
2004	Stories from the Golf	Director / Writer / Producer	TV series
2007	The Librarians	Writer	TV series
2008	Very Small Business	Creator / Writer / Producer	TV series
2013	Upper Middle Bogan	Creator / Director / Writer	TV series
2015	Little Lunch	Writer / Producer	TV series Writer
2015	Now Add Honey	Director / Producer	Feature fim
2018	Back in Very Small Business	Writer / Producer	TV series
2019	The InBESTigators	Creator / Writer	TV series, 40 episodes
2022	Summer Love	Creator / Writer	TV series, 8 episodes
