= Robyn Butler =

Australian writer, actress and producer

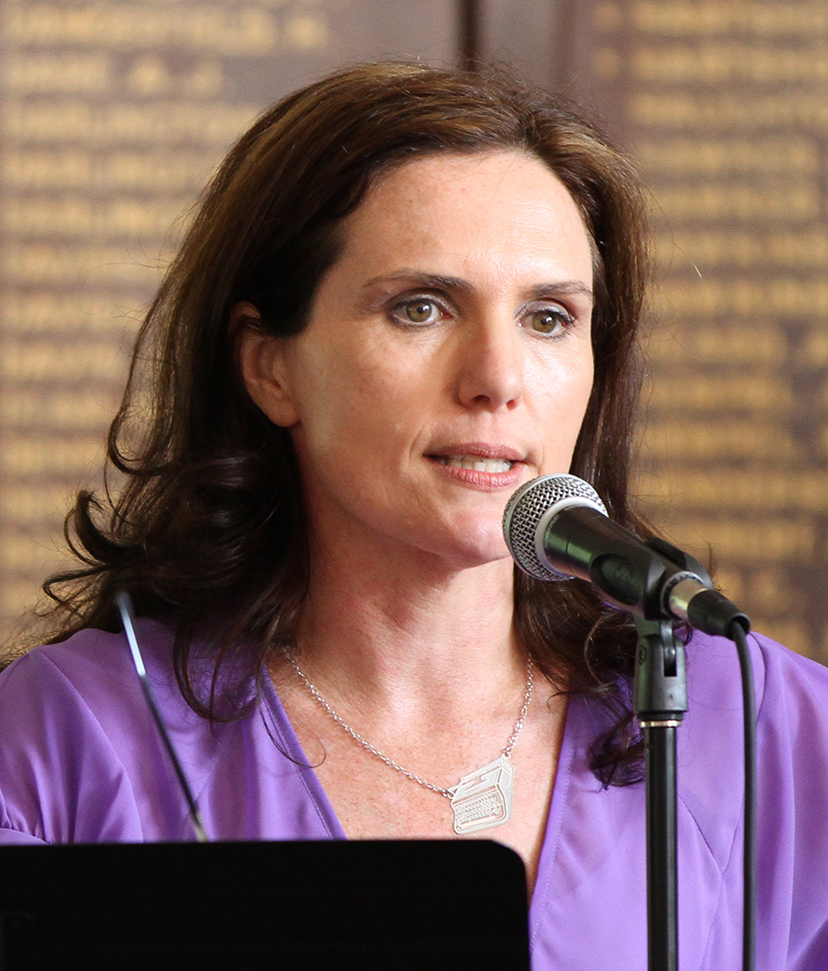
- Butler during a live performance in 2011
- Occupations: Writer, actor, producer
- Years active: 1990–present
- Spouse: Wayne Hope
- Children: Molly Daniels
- Website: www.gristmill.com.au

Robyn Butler is an Australian writer, actress, and producer, best known for her starring role in the television comedy series The Librarians, which she also wrote, produced and directed. She married Wayne Hope, with whom she has co-created several television series and runs the production company Gristmill.

== Career ==
Butler hosted a radio program called Tough Love on the Triple M network in 2005.

She co-wrote, co-produced, co-executive-produced, and performed in The Librarians (2007-2010), which was directed and co-produced with Wayne Hope. Other credits include Stories from the Golf, Very Small Business, Upper Middle Bogan, and Summer Love.

In 2025, Butler and Hope created, wrote, and directed the Stan Original series Dear Life, which premiered on the platform on 1 January 2026.

== Personal life ==
Butler is married to Wayne Hope with whom she runs the production company Gristmill.

Writer, director, and actor Molly Daniels is the daughter of Butler and step-daughter of Hope.

== Filmography ==
=== Television ===
Year	Title	Role	Notes
2024	Shaun Micallef's Eve of Destruction	Self	1 episode
2024	Colin from Accounts	Wendy	1 episode
2022	Shaun Micallef's Mad as Hell	Self	1 episode
2022	Summer Love	Marion	1 episode
2020	Love in Lockdown	Emily	1 episode
2020	Australian Story	Self	2 episodes
2011, 2018–19	Talkin' 'Bout Your Generation	Self, Team Captain	18 episodes
2018	Back In Very Small Business	Kylie	1 episode
2017	Get Krack!n	Malorie Naylor	1 episode
2015	Young Love	Rachel Meyer	1 episode
2013	Upper Middle Bogan	Cathy	1 episode
2011	Arrabella Twat	Arrabella Twat	4 episodes
2010	Sleuth 101	Michelle	1 episode
2007–10	The Librarians	Frances O'Brien	20 episodes
2008	Very Small Business	Jasmine	1 episode
2004	Stories From The Golf	Various	10 episodes
2003	Welcher & Welcher	Kate Welcher	8 episodes
2002	Short Cuts	Gillian Hartnell	4 episodes
1999–01	The Micallef P(r)ogram(me)	Various	3 episodes
1999	The Mick Molloy Show	Various	3 episodes
1998	Small Tales & True	Various	6 episodes
1997	Eric	Various	9 episodes
1994	A Country Practice	Lesley O'Brien	1 episode
1994	Janus	Helen Watson	1 episode
1993	The Comedy Sale	Various	3 episodes
1990	The Money or the Gun		1 episode

=== Film / Shorts ===
Year	Title	Role	Notes
2015	Hammer or Claw	Kate	Short
2015	Now Add Honey	Caroline	
2006	BoyTown	Woman Fan	
2004	The Brush Off	Wendy Whelan	TV film
2004	Stiff	Wendy Whelan	TV film
2002	Crackerjack	Mandy	

=== Production credits ===
Year	Title	Role	Notes
2026	Dear Life	Writer, director	Stan Original; 6 episodes
2024	Colin from Accounts	Director	3 episodes
2022	Summer Love	Creator / Executive Producer / Director	8 episodes (5 directed)
2020	Love in Lockdown	Producer	6 episodes
2019	The Inbestigators	Executive Producer / Director	40 episodes (11 directed)
2018	Back In Very Small Business	Director / Executive Producer	8 episodes
2016	Furst Born	Executive Producer	TV Movie
2015-16	Little Lunch	Director / Executive Producer	28 episodes
2013-16	Upper Middle Bogan	Executive Producer	24 episodes
2015	Now Add Honey	Executive Producer	
2011	Jobbing Actors	Producer	Short
2011	Arrabella Twat	Writer / Creator	6 episodes
2007-10	The Librarians	Producer / Creator	20 episodes
2010	The Librarians in Profile	Producer / Creator	10 episodes
2009	The Making of Librarians	Producer / Creator	
2008	Very Small Business	Creator / Additional material	6 episodes
2004	Stories from the Golf	Producer / Writer / Director	13 episodes (6 directed)

== Radio ==
- Tough Love with Mick Molloy (Triple M network 2003–05)
