= The Librarians (2007 TV series) =

Australian television comedy series (2007–2010)

- The Librarians title card
- Genre: Situation comedy
- Created by: Wayne Hope; Robyn Butler
- Directed by: Wayne Hope; Tony Martin
- Starring: Robyn Butler; Roz Hammond; Heidi Arena; Stephen Ballantyne; Keith Brockett; Bob Franklin; Wayne Hope; Nicole Nabout; Kym Gyngell; Josh Lawson
- Opening theme: "A Night in Tunisia" by Dizzy Gillespie
- Composer: James Black
- Country of origin: Australia
- Original language: English
- No. of seasons: 3
- No. of episodes: 20

Production
- Production company: Gristmill

Original release
- Network: ABC TV
- Release: 31 October 2007 – 1 December 2010

The Librarians is an Australian television comedy series which premiered on 31 October 2007 on ABC TV. In the Republic of Ireland, the show aired on RTÉ Two. The series is produced and written by Robyn Butler and Wayne Hope who are also the principal cast members. Hope is also the series' director. The first series comprised six half-hour episodes. The second series with another six episodes began airing on 5 August 2009 and was filmed at the Royal Melbourne Showgrounds.

The series centres on the trials and tribulations of Frances O'Brien, a devoutly Catholic, sexless, inept, humorless, blithely racist, self-important and insensitive Head Librarian. Her life unravels when she is forced to employ her ex-best friend, Christine Grimwood – now a petty drug dealer who needs a character reference – as the Children's Librarian. Frances must do all she can to contain her menacing past and concentrate on the biggest event of the library calendar – Book Week.

Filming on a third and final series took place in early 2010 and aired on ABC1 later that year. The theme music for The Librarians is an upbeat variation on the popular jazz tune "A Night in Tunisia" by Dizzy Gillespie.

The Librarians was rated M in New Zealand for offensive language, sexual references and drug use.

== Episodes ==
=== Season 1: 2007 ===
Episode	Title	Original airdate	Viewers	Nightly rank
1	"Should old Acquaintance be Forgot?"	31 October 2007	1292000	5
2	"Repeat Offender"	7 November 2007	1084000	14
3	"4 Kilos to Book Week"	14 November 2007	1006000	N/A
4	"Unholy Matrimony"	21 November 2007	1040000	13
5	"Amnesty"	28 November 2007	988000	12
6	"And Nothing but the Truth"	5 December 2007	1001000	10

=== Season 2: 2009 ===
Episode	Title	Original airdate	Viewers	Nightly rank
1	"Just Returned"	5 August 2009	1053000	11
2	"This Little Piggy"	12 August 2009	1028000	13
3	"Cut to the Quick"	19 August 2009	843000	19
4	"Romeos And Juliets"	26 August 2009	877000	17
5	"Deliverance"	2 September 2009	827000	16
6	"My Rock"	9 September 2009	936000	15

=== Season 3: 2010 ===
Episode	Title	Original airdate	Viewers	Consolidated Viewers	Nightly rank
1	"Mother Pearl"	13 October 2010	726000	788215	15
2	"Quid Pro Quo"	20 October 2010	541000	596098	26
3	"Tsukiji"	27 October 2010	595000	661706	25
4	"Dark Before Dawn"	3 November 2010	582000	642233	20
5	"Kerching Kerching"	10 November 2010	572000	615530	24
6	"Milk, Not Cheese, Moon"	17 November 2010	534000	564685	25
7	"Pearl of Wisdom"	24 November 2010	489000	520072	25
8	"Power and the Passion"	1 December 2010	658000	710174	19

== Cast ==
=== Main cast ===
- Robyn Butler as Frances O'Brien
- Roz Hammond as Christine Grimwood
- Heidi Arena as Dawn McConnichie, in a wheelchair, thanks to Frances' inattention
- Stephen Ballantyne as Matthew Bytnskov
- Keith Brockett as Ky Lee
- Bob Franklin as Neil Slider, attracted to Christine
- Wayne Hope as Terry O'Brien, in love with his wife, who ignores him
- Nicole Nabout as Nada al Farouk, a smart Muslim lady and target of Frances' intolerance
- Kim Gyngell as Father Harris, irritated by Frances' religiosity
- Josh Lawson as Lachie Davis (season 1)
- Fiona Harris as Jane (seasons 2 and 3)
- Victoria Eagger as Pearl O'Leary (season 3)

=== Guests ===
- Grant Piro as Piero (season 1)
- Stephen Curry as Life Coach (season 1)
- Kate Kendall as Jacinta McSweeney (season 1)
- Greg Stone as Premier Carter (season 1)
- Molly Daniels as Bridget / Bernadette (seasons 1 and 2)
- Noni Hazelhurst as Midwife (season 2)
- Marty Sheargold as Paolo (seasons 2 and 3)
- Hamish Blake as HD News Journalist, Jake Jackson (season 2)
- Lesley Baker as Christine's Aunt (season 2, 1 episode)
- Vince Colosimo as Adrian Green, Head of the Australian Library Association (season 2)
- Tony Martin as Gene, Adrian Green's boyfriend (season 2)
- Angus Sampson as Xavier Fisher (season 3)
- Tony Moclair as Bingo (season 3)
- Justin Hamilton as Biscuit (season 3)
- Lachy Hulme as Hasan, Nada's ex-husband (season 3)
- Peta Brady as Marzena Stovic (2 episodes)
- Peter Garrett as himself (season 3)
- Hannah Gadsby as Carmel (seasons 2 and 3)
- Celia Pacquola as Indigo (season 3)
- Patrick Brammall as Stuart (season 3)
- Amanda Muggleton as Rose McConnichie (season 3)
- Sue Jones as Olywn Slider (season 3, 2 episodes)
- Toby Truslove as Dave

== Awards and nominations ==
Year	Award	Category	Nominee	Series	Result	Ref
2009	Australian Film Institute Awards	Best Performance in a Television Comedy	Robyn Butler	Series 2	Nominated	
2011	Equity Awards	Most Outstanding Performance by an Ensemble in a Comedy Series	Cast	—	Won	

== Series 1 DVD & Blu-ray release ==
The Librarians
Set details	Special features
6 Episodes; 16:9 Aspect Ratio; Subtitles: Yes; English (2.0 Stereo); Total running time: approx. 172 minutes	Audio commentary by Robyn Butler and Wayne Hope; Photo board; ABC promo interview; Alternative ending for Episode 4; Deleted scene from Episode 6
Release date
Region 4 5 December 2007

== Series 2 DVD & Blu-ray release ==
The Librarians Series 2
Set details	Special features
6 Episodes; 16:9 Aspect Ratio; Subtitles: Yes; English (Dolby Digital 2.0 Stereo); Total running time: approx. 223 minutes	Audio commentary by Robyn Butler, Wayne Hope, Roz Hammond and Heidi Arena; The Making of The Librarians; Frances' unheard library opening speech; Christine's Ante Natal Classes; Neil's Online Assignments; Deleted scene; Outtakes
Release date
Region 4 1 October 2009 (Series 1&2 Blu-ray also released)

== See also ==
- List of Australian television series
- List of programs broadcast by ABC (Australian TV network)
