= Bert La Bonté =

Australian actor

Bert LaBonté
- Occupation: Actor
- Years active: 1997–present
- Notable work: NCIS: Sydney; Five Bedrooms; The Newsreader'; Last Seen
- Spouse: Amanda LaBonté

Bert LaBonté (born 1974 or 1975) is an Australian stage, film and television actor. With a career that has spanned over 20 years, LaBonté's most known roles include Five Bedrooms and The Newsreader.

== Early life and education ==
Bert LaBonté was born in 1974 or 1975. He grew up in Melbourne's southeastern suburbs with his parents and two older sisters. His parents migrated from Mauritius in the late 1960s.

He discovered a passion for acting at nine when he played Fagin in his school production of Oliver!.

At 17 LaBonté enrolled in performing arts at the University of Ballarat.

== Career ==
LaBonté's extensive theatre credits include Rupert, Birdland, Elling, Lungs, Richard III, A Behanding in Spokane, The Female of the Species and The Mountaintop (Melbourne Theatre Company), Phèdre (Bell Shakespeare), I Am a Miracle and The Good Person of Szechuan (Malthouse Theatre).

His musical theatre credits include The 25th Annual Putnam County Spelling Bee (Melbourne Theatre Company/Sydney Theatre Company), An Officer and a Gentleman, Dream Lover: The Bobby Darin Musical, The Book of Mormon (GFO), Grey Gardens, Chess, and Kismet (The Production Company), Guys and Dolls (Ambassador Theatre Group), Next to Normal (Melbourne Theatre Company), Pippin (Kookaburra), Jesus Christ Superstar (UK tour for Really Useful Group), When I Fall In Love – The Nat King Cole Story, and Let's Get It On – The Life & Music of Marvin Gaye.

His film and television credits include Animal Kingdom, Nightmares and Dreamscapes, Rats and Cats, Salem's Lot, The Newsreader and My Life is Murder.

In 2023, LaBonté performed in the musical theatre version of Moulin Rouge.

LaBonte has a role in the ABC series Dustfall.

== Other roles ==
LaBonté has served on the board of Essential Theatre.

== Personal life ==
LaBonté is married to actress Amanda LaBonté.

LaBonte resides in Geelong, Victoria. For a number of years in the late 1990s to the early 2000s he was a lead singer in local Geelong Band called “Madhouse”

== Awards ==
LaBonté received the Helpmann Award and Sydney Theatre Award for Best Male Actor in a Supporting Role in a Musical in 2012 for his performance in An Officer and a Gentleman. He was also nominated in 2005 for Spelling Bee and again in 2017 for The Book of Mormon.

== Filmography ==
=== Film ===
Year	Title	Role	Notes
2026	Thrash	Jimmy	Feature film
2023	Teach Me How to Cry	Sol Desmond	Short film
2020	The Very Excellent Mr. Dundee	Roland Day	Feature film
2012	In Fantasy	Ashane	Short film
2010	Animal Kingdom	PSG Santo	Feature film
2007	Rats and Cats	Teddy Taiwan	TV movie
2003	The Situation Room		Short film
2003	Evil Never Dies	Rookie Cops	TV movie

=== Television ===
Year	Title	Role	Notes	Ref
2026	Last Seen	Bill McCracken	TV series	
2026	Dustfall	Remi Jolicoeur	TV series	
2023	SugarHope Records	Luketha	4 episodes	
2023-present	NCIS: Sydney	NCIS Special Agent Ken Carter	8 episodes	
2023	Spooky Files	Robert	2 episodes	
2023	Erotic Stories	George	1 episode (Philia)	
2023	Home and Away	Samuel Edwards	TV series, 3 episodes	
2022-23	Five Bedrooms	Ed Laurent	TV series, 7 episodes	
2022-24	Colin From Accounts	Matt	TV series, 2 episode	
2022	Surviving Summer	Mattias Mercer	TV series, 3 episodes	
2022	Pieces of Her	Interviewing Reporter	TV series, 2 episodes	
2022	More Than This	Mr E	TV series, 6 episodes	
2021	The Newsreader	Gordon	TV series, 6 episodes	
2021	The Power of a Dream	Retired Athlete	TV series, 1 episode	
2021	With Intent (aka Lie With Me)	Phil	TV series, 3 episodes	
2021	Jack Irish	Det. Dufrense	TV series, 1 episode	
2021	Ms Fisher's Modern Murder Mysteries	Dirk Wade	TV series, 1 episode	
2021	Fisk	William	TV series, 1 episode	
1996-2020	Neighbours	James Soloman / Peter Dwyer / Fire Officer	TV series, 5 episodes	
2020	Retrograde	Semesa	TV series, 1 episode	
2019	Playing for Keeps	Nick Siddiqui	TV series, 2 episodes	
2019	My Life Is Murder	Iman Abarr	TV series, 1 episode	
2019	Squinters	Lacey	TV series, 1 episode	
2018-19	Wentworth	Rodney Gavin	TV series, 4 episodes	
2019	The Letdown	Neale	TV series, 2 episodes	
2019	Mr Black	Mike Edwards	TV series, 1 episode	
2013-16	Upper Middle Bogan	Constable Miklis	TV series, 3 episodes	
2016	Tomorrow When the War Began	Dr Novak	TV miniseries, 3 episodes	
2015	Winners & Losers	Snr Constable Singh	TV series, 1 episode	
2010-12	Lowdown	Shane McKay / Mike Lavish	TV series, 2 episodes	
2010	Sea Patrol	Rudy	TV series, 1 episode	
2010	Wilfred	Third AD	TV series, 1 episode	
2009	City Homicide	Aban Nasir	TV series, 1 episode	
2007	Pirate Islands: The Lost Treasure of Fiji	Sharktooth Pete	TV series, 13 episodes	
2006	Nightmares & Dreamscapes: From the Stories of Stephen King	Otis Redding	TV miniseries, 1 episode	
1997-04	Blue Heelers	Karl Tyler / Roy Nicol	TV series, 2 episodes	
2000	Flipper	Robie's Friend	TV series, 1 episode	
1998	Good Guys, Bad Guys	Constable #1	TV series, 1 episode	
1997	Simone deBeauvoir's Babies	Foreign Man	TV miniseries, 2 episodes	

=== Other appearances ===
Year	Title	Role	Notes	Ref
2024	The Cook up with Adam Liaw	Self	TV series	
2023	Thrash and Treasure	Self	Podcast	
2022	Backstage	Self	Podcast	

== Theatre and stage ==
LaBonté has performed across theatre and stage for over 20 years. In 2023, LaBonte appeared in the musical Moulin Rouge!. LaBonté performed as Marvin Gaye in Let's Get It On!. On 1 November 2024, LaBonté would be announced alongside Pamela Rabe for the co-production between Belvoir St and Black Swan Theatre Co for the play August: Osage County.

On 11 August 2026, LaBonté was named for the Australian Tour of Shawshank Redemption in the role of Red Redding.

Year	Title	Role	Notes	Ref
2026	Shawshank Redemption	Red Redding	Australian Tour	
2026	Retrograde		Play Director	
2024-2025	August: Osage County	Bill	Belvoir / Black Swan	
2024	Top Dog/Under Dog		Play director	
2023	Fences	Troy Maxon	STC	
2023	Moulin Rouge!	Toulouse Lautrec	Global Creatures	
2021	The Truth	Paul	MTC	
2019	Kiss of the SpiderWoman	Warden	Melbourne Theatre Co	
2017	The Book of Mormon	Mafala	Watchtower	
2016	Dream Lover	Charlie	Watchtower	
2016	Lungs	M	Melbourne Theatre Co	
2015	High Society	Dexter Haven	Hayes Theatre	
2014	Let's Get It On!	Marvin Gaye		
2012	An Officer and a Gentleman	Officer Foley		
