= List of Wilfred (Australian TV series) episodes =

The following is a list of episodes of the Australian television series Wilfred. The series premiered on SBS TV on 19 March 2007. It ran for two seasons of eight episodes each; the finale aired on 26 April 2010.

== Series overview ==
Series	Episodes	Originally released	
Series	Episodes	First released	Last released
1	8	19 March 2007	7 May 2007
2	8	8 March 2010	26 April 2010

== Episodes ==
=== Season 1 (2007) ===
No. overall	No. in season	Title	Written by	Original release date
1	1	"There Is A Dog"	Unknown	19 March 2007
Adam is invited back to Sarah's place after a Powderfinger concert, where he meets Wilfred. Wilfred offers him a bong and quickly sizes him up as a lightweight. After a night of troubled dreams, Adam awakes unsure of exactly what he has got himself into. When Sarah leaves to do some shopping, Wilfred shows Adam the holes he has dug all over the garden, explaining that he has anxiety issues due to Sarah's string of failed relationships. Adam spends the day cleaning the yard. When Sarah returns, she easily convinces him to stay for dinner. Even Wilfred appears to be warming to Adam, providing him with a clean set of clothes and accompanying him to the pub. Over a couple of beers Wilfred questions Adam's motives, and warns him not to leave Sarah like all her previous boyfriends have done. After dinner, Adam can't find his own clothes and Sarah gladly invites him to stay another night. In a post-credits scene, Wilfred is seen burning Adam's clothes.
2	2	"Dog Day Afterglow"	Unknown	26 March 2007
Adam and Sarah's relationship is blossoming. Sarah tells Adam how important it is that he and Wilfred get on well. Adam responds that he loves Wilfred and to prove it he decides to spend some quality time with him. Wilfred is in his den – depressed. He says that he is very sick and "could be on the way out" (this may have something to do with the pizza Adam bought him the night before). He says that if he dies, Adam will have to look after Sarah. Adam obtains the keys to Sarah's attic, where he and Wilfred have a bonding session – drinking beer, smoking weed, playing pool and watching porn. Later, Wilfred takes Adam on a mission to steal marijuana plants from an illegal plantation. Successfully back at home, Wilfred bemoans his lost tennis balls. Adam offers to climb on the roof and retrieve them, but in doing so he falls and has to be taken to hospital. He wakes to find Sarah by his side. Adam wonders aloud what a wonderful girl like Sarah is doing with a guy like him, but Sarah reaffirms that she loves only him. In a post-credits scene, Wilfred places Adam's wallet among the marijuana plants.
3	3	"Dogs Of War"	Unknown	2 April 2007
Tension is growing between Adam and Wilfred. Wilfred resents the fact that Adam is now spending so much time with Sarah, and Adam is convinced that Wilfred is trying to sabotage his relationship. A covert psychological battle ensues under Sarah's nose. Wilfred urinates on the toilet seat knowing it will get blamed on Adam. In retaliation, Adam successfully plays the hand in warm water trick on Wilfred, to grudging respect. Wilfred begins to dig up old dildos in the garden, prompting Adam to question Sarah about her opinion on sex toys. When Sarah cooks lamb chops for dinner, Adam attempts to lace Wilfred's serving with a dog laxative. The scheme goes wrong and Sarah ends up in hospital, thinking she has eaten a "dodgy chop". Feeling better, she suggests that she and Adam should go dildo shopping – but her fantasy is not quite what Adam had in mind. After the credits, Wilfred plays the hand-in-warm-water trick on Adam.
4	4	"Walking The Dog"	Steve Marton (Mark)	9 April 2007
Sarah and Adam find an old home-movie showing Sarah, Mark and Wilfred playing happily together. Sarah is upset at the memory; Adam suggests that they take a day trip to the beach to help get Sarah's mind off it. However, Sarah takes them to the beach she and Mark often used to visit – this is not what Adam wanted, and an argument ensues. Adam goes swimming with Wilfred, but is caught in a rip and nearly drowns. He is rescued and resuscitated by a pair of surf-lifesavers, who admonish him for not swimming between the flags. Sarah is greeted by some of Mark's former surfing buddies, who are unimpressed with her new love interest. They return to the local general store for a beer, leaving Wilfred outside. Wilfred becomes frustrated with being ignored, and walks off. After talking for some time, Adam and Sarah realise Wilfred has gone. They search until dark, but with the police no help, they drive home devastated after a disastrous day. Upon returning home, much to their relief they find that Wilfred is already there – Mark's buddies have found him and taken him home. After the credits, Wilfred watches more of the home-movie. Mark realises Wilfred has left muddy paw-prints on his shirt, becomes angry and abuses Wilfred.
5	5	"The Dog Whisperer"	Kim Gyngell (Jack Underwood)	16 April 2007
After Wilfred displays behavioural problems, Adam calls Jack Underwood, a reality-TV vet. Sarah has mixed feelings about this; she thinks it reflects badly on her as a dog owner. Wilfred talks to Jack; Jack seems to understand him at some level. Jack decides that Wilfred's problems stem from Adam's treatment of him, and his living conditions. Adam buys a bigger kennel. While he is building it, Jack and Sarah talk about Wilfred. Jack suggests that Sarah may have to choose between boyfriend and dog. When the show finally airs, Jack declares that Adam needs to "grow up" if he wants the responsibility of a pet. After the credits, Wilfred sets fire to the new kennel.
6	6	"Dog Eat Dog"	Damian Walshe-Howling (Keith); Angus Sampson (Cyros)	23 April 2007
Keith, a well known film star and "old friend" of Sarah's, comes to visit and brings extravagant gifts. He also brings his dog, Cyros – a younger and more aggressive hound than Wilfred. Wilfred and Adam both feel threatened by the two interlopers. Keith, Sarah and Adam play totem tennis in the backyard. Keith humiliates Adam, who then plays way too aggressively against Sarah and freaks her out. Meanwhile, Wilfred and Cyros brag in an ever-increasing game of one-upmanship. Eventually Cyros threatens to kill Wilfred and replace him in Sarah's life. Although Sarah is already beginning to tire of Keith's tall stories and self-absorption, Adam and Wilfred believe that they are being usurped, and concoct a plan to deal with the situation. Adam, acting unusually manly, mentions that he is going to the hardware store. Keith predictably offers to go in his stead, in an attempt to show Adam up. As Keith and Cyros reverse out of the driveway, Wilfred feigns being hit by their car. Sarah rushes to Wilfred's aid, and snaps at Keith for being so careless. The pair leave the house in disgrace, and Adam and Wilfred regain their peace of mind. After the credits, Keith and Cyros sneak in at night to retrieve a water-feature Keith gave to Sarah.
7	7	"Barking Behind Bars"	Damian Richardson (Hank); Emma Tate (Jane)	30 April 2007
After Wilfred defecates on his laptop, Adam has had enough. He takes Wilfred for a walk in the park and lets him run off-leash. Wilfred is soon captured by two dogcatchers. He calls to Adam who ignores him – Wilfred realises Adam's sinister plan, and is furious. Adam goes home and explains to a concerned Sarah that Wilfred has been run over and is dead. Sarah is devastated and insists on seeing the body, but he claims to have already cremated and buried Wilfred on a mate's farm. Sarah is undeterred, and Adam is forced to weave a more and more complex web of deceit. Meanwhile, Wilfred is in the pound and on death row. He manages to escape with the help of the other dogs and a sympathetic dogcatcher. Sarah conducts a backyard burial ceremony for "Wilfred" (actually a pile of bloody bones that Adam has obtained from a butcher). When the real Wilfred turns up, the mourners quickly realise that Adam has faked Wilfred's death and chase him from the garden. Sarah later forgives a bruised and battered Adam, as she believes his goal was to save her the trauma of knowing Wilfred had run away. The after-credits scene shows an empty couch, in contrast to the frequent "couch scenes" throughout the series.
8	8	"This Dog's Life"	James Saunders (Peter Fitzpatrick)	7 May 2007
Sarah is pregnant. Unfortunately, it's not Adam's. Adam moves out and back into his own flat on the other side of town. Wilfred realises how much he misses Adam, and in his anxiety begins to dig enormous holes in the garden. One day, a lawyer turns up at Sarah's house, informing her that Mark's parents have successfully contested his will, and that she has to move out of the house. Wilfred calls on Adam's chivalrous nature and convinces him to do something about it. They follow the lawyer back to his house, where Adam threatens him with a rifle. The rifle goes off and kills the man during a struggle. They dispose of the body in the hole Wilfred has dug. Wilfred declares that this means that Adam and he are now as good as family. Later, Sarah (somehow no longer pregnant) apologises to Adam – they get back together and the three of them move into Adam's place.

=== Season 2 (2010) ===
No. overall	No. in season	Title	Guest starring	Ratings (5 city)	Original release date
1	9	"Kiss Me Kat"	Imaan Hadchiti (Possum); Kestie Morassi (Kat)	110,000	8 March 2010
After the trio move into a new house at 22 Dalziel St, Richmond, Wilfred and Adam enter a competition with each other to determine who is the happiest. Along the way, Wilfred falls under the spell of a sexy cat and Adam decides the best way to sort out his and Sarah's relationship problems is to get married. The proposal goes awry and Wilfred’s burgeoning relationship with the cat hits a snag. It’s hard to see who’s happiest through eyes full of tears.
2	10	"Dog Of A Town (Part 1)"	Stephen Curry (Cockatoo), David Field (Arthur); Jim Daly (Phil), Maureen Sherlock (Peg)	131,000	15 March 2010
Adam wants to ask Sarah’s father permission to marry his daughter. The problem is that Sarah’s parents live in Nambour, Queensland. They get kicked off the train after Adam argues with the staff and Wilfred eats a pet cockatoo, and have to hitch-hike the rest of the way. Adam is confronted with Phil and Peg, Sarah’s nudist parents. Wilfred is also confronted with his disapproving father, Arthur. This is too much for Wilfred and he runs away.
3	11	"Dog Of A Town (Part 2)"	David Field (Arthur); Jim Daly (Phil), Maureen Sherlock (Peg)	109,000	22 March 2010
Arthur has a feeling he knows where Wilfred has gone. With his help, Adam and Sarah find Wilfred standing on the edge of a cliff, contemplating suicide. Arthur talks Wilfred back from the brink, and they return home for some father-son bonding. Phil and Peg have trouble accepting Adam because he has not participated in their nudism. Sarah asks them to help make Adam feel comfortable, and Adam finally gets nude and asks Phil for Sarah's hand in marriage. Meanwhile Wilfred and Arthur are playing Force ‘Em Backs in the park, when Arthur has a heart attack. With his last breaths he reconciles with Wilfred before dying in his arms.
4	12	"Honey, You're Killing The Dog"	Victoria Thaine (Cynthia Bennett); Kim Gyngell (Jack Underwood)	145,000	29 March 2010
Sarah goes to London to study at the Royal College of Art for three months; she leaves on a sour note as Adam brings up her prior infidelity. Wilfred takes the opportunity to eat up a storm, and quickly becomes obese. The vet, Dr. Jack Underwood, uses computer-generated images to warn Adam that Wilfred will die within weeks if his current lifestyle continues. Cynthia Bennett, a volunteer from People and Pets, helps Adam get Wilfred back into shape. Adam contemplates leaving Sarah for the very pleasant Cynthia, but Wilfred counsels that he would miss Sarah's fiery personality. Sarah returns to find a G-string belonging to Cynthia, but Adam assures her that everything is "above board".
5	13	"The Ice Dog Cometh"	Simon Wilton (Larz), Maya Aleksandra (Hilda); Jessica Gower (Annika)	146,000	5 April 2010
Adam wins a skiing holiday for Sarah and himself, so the threesome head off to Mt Buller. Adam gets lost in a snowstorm and is forced to spend the night in a makeshift igloo. The next morning he is rescued by Swedish couple Larz and Hilda who promptly invite him into their giant spa. Sarah and Wilfred arrive and Sarah joins the humans in the spa. Larz takes Adam skiing and hits on him. Hilda hits on Sarah in the spa and Annika – Larz and Hilda’s dog – hits on Wilfred, but Wilfred experiences performance difficulties. On the way home, Adam, Wilfred and Sarah decide that what happened on the mountain stays on the mountain.
6	14	"The Dog Father"	Josh Lawson (Spencer); Kate Jenkinson (Caddy)	165,000	12 April 2010
Wilfred is romancing Caddy, one of the local dogs, who soon discovers she is pregnant. Meanwhile Adam and Sarah receive a visit from Adam’s better-looking brother, Spencer, who is apparently a world-travelling guru. Sarah is so taken with Spencer’s 'spiritual' preachings that it starts to undermine her relationship with Adam. Caddy's owners are away, so Wilfred arranges for Adam, Sarah and Spencer to take her to the vet. She gives birth to four puppies, and Sarah discovers that Spencer is a bullshit-artist; he has plagiarised his teachings from the internet, and only pretends to believe them so he can pick up chicks. The puppies are soon sold and life at 22 Dalziel St. returns to normal.
7	15	"Dog Star"	Ditch Davey (Clarence Vertigo), Paul Denny (Tony); Michael Carman (Roger Dalton), Alex Menglet (Orpheus Cruikshank)	147,000	19 April 2010
Sarah is angry that Adam still doesn’t have a job, as she doesn’t want to marry an unemployed guy. Wilfred sees another dog on a television commercial and decides he wants to be a dog star. He persuades Adam to manage him. Sarah doesn’t want a bar of it – she doesn’t like people who exploit animals for financial gain. But they are not deterred, and Wilfred soon gains a small part in a dog-food commercial. Clarence, the dog with the lead part, is arrogant and abusive, so Wilfred hits him. The director is impressed with Wilfred's "chutzpah" and offers him the lead role, for which Adam negotiates a handsome fee. Wilfred's acting career is off to a good start and Adam is well on his way to paying for the wedding.
8	16	"Bite Club"	Andy McPhee (Kosciuszko), Paul Moder (Celebrant/MC); Samuel Johnson (cameo)	173,000	26 April 2010
Having blown all his cash unsuccessfully promoting Wilfred's acting ability, Adam once again needs to find some money to buy Sarah a wedding ring. Wilfred decides to help him out by taking part in a dogfight, where he gets clobbered by a towering Doberman called Kosciuszko. Kosciuszko turns out to be an aspiring actor, so Wilfred offers him a part in his non-existent movie in exchange for fight training. After weeks of training, Adam enters Wilfred in a large cage fight – Wilfred defeats all challengers, fatally knocking out Kosciuszko in the final. Wilfred is devastated, but they finally have the money to pay for the ring. At the wedding, Adam and Sarah have just exchanged vows when the police arrive and arrest Adam for illegal dogfighting. Sarah drowns her sorrows, but eagerly agrees to go out with Sam, an old acquaintance. In a manner echoing the pilot episode, Wilfred introduces himself to Sam, who is left speechless as the credits roll.
