= Zwar =

Zwar is a surname. Notable people with the surname include:

- Adam Zwar (born 1972), Australian actor, voice actor and writer
- Albert Zwar (1863–1935), Australian politician
- Charles Zwar (1911–1989), Australian songwriter, composer, lyricist, pianist and music director
- Desmond Zwar (1931–2022), Australian author and reporter
- Henry Zwar (1873–1959), Australian politician
- Traugott Bernhard Zwar (1876–1947), Australian academic, army medical officer and surgeon

== See also ==
- Kyaw Zwar Minn, Burmese diplomat
