= Sophie Wright (actress) =

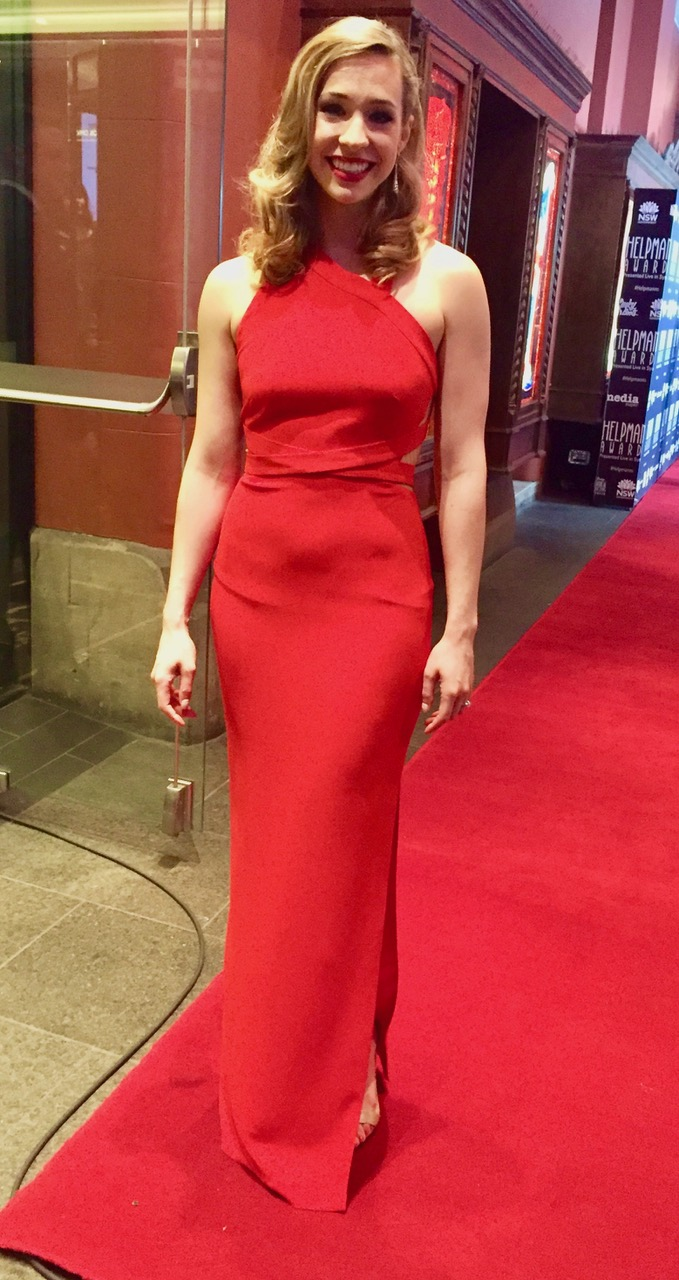
- Wright at the 17th Annual Helpmann Awards

Background information
- Born: Australia
- Genres: Film and Tv, Music Theatre
- Occupations: Actor, Singer
- Years active: 2004–present

Sophie Wright is an Australian musical theatre and screen actress, and a graduate of the Western Australian Academy of Performing Arts. Wright made her professional music theatre debut in 2013 in the Australasian production of Wicked, as the Elphaba cover and in the ensemble. Other notable works are a featured performer in Hugh Jackman's Broadway to Oz (2015), Kate Monster/Lucy in the Melbourne production of Avenue Q (2016), Lauren in the Australian premiere of Kinky Boots (2016-2017) and Angela Black in the Australian television comedy series Mr Black (2018-2019) starring Stephen Curry, Nadine Garner, Nicholas Russell and Paul Denny, on Network 10. In 2017 she was judged by the Age newspaper to be No 6 of "Meet the Aussie stars to watch "

== Biography ==
Born in Sydney, NSW.

Wright was accepted into WAAPA's Bachelor of Music Theatre degree, graduating in 2011. Following WAAPA, Wright played the role of Nicole Woodlowe in Monster Pictures horror thriller movie The Butcher Possessions (originally named ‘Beckoning the Butcher’) and as Lana in LAD Feature Film Pty Ltd Is This the Real World?

In 2013, Wright made her professional music theatre debut in the Broadway musical Wicked (2013-2015) as the Elphaba cover touring New Zealand, Philippines and Australia. Following Wicked, Wright joined the ensemble cast of Hugh Jackman's concert arena Broadway to Oz (2015) touring nationally.

Other credits include, Song Contest – The Almost Eurovision Experience, as Young Sally in Follies in Concert and as Kate Monster and Lucy in Avenue Q (Prince Moo Productions).

Wright was the original Australian Lauren in the Australian premiere of Kinky Boots (the Michael Cassell Group) in 2016–17. She was nominated for a Helpmann Award "Best Female Actor in a Musical" in 2017 She also played the role of June and Mazeppa in the Hayes Theatre/Luckiest Production of Gypsy.

Wright also plays Angela Black in the new comedy television series Mr Black, to be seen on Network 10 in 2019 alongside Stephen Curry, Nadine Garner, Nicholas Russell and Paul Denny.

== Personal life ==
Other than performing, Wright's main interest is the psychology and mindset of performers and creative people.

== Stage Credits ==
=== Television ===
Year	Title	Type	Location	Role	
2018	Mr Black	TV series (8 eps)	Melbourne	Angela Black	CJZ /Network Ten
2003	Marking Time (ABC TV/Beyond Productions)	Mini TV series (1 ep)	Sydney	Rachel Maranos	ABC/Beyond Productions

=== Film ===
Year	Title	Role	Notes
2013	Is this the Real World?	Lana	LAD Feature Film Pty Ltd. Dir: Martin McKenna
2013	The Butcher Possessions	Nicole Woodlowe	Formerly Beckoning the Butcher. Monster Films
2012	Party Goods, etc (Short)	Katie	Live & Learn Productions

=== Stage ===
Year	Title	Role	Notes
2018	Gypsy	June and Mazeppa	Hayes Theatre/Luckiest Productions
2016-2017	Kinky Boots	Lauren	Michael Cassell Group
2016	Avenue Q	Kate the Monster and Lucy	Prince Moo Productions
2016	Follies in Concert	Young Sally	Storeyboard Entertainment
2016	Song Contest – Almost Eurovision Experience	Ensemble	Song Contest International Trust
2015	Broadway to Oz – Hugh Jackman’s Concert Arena	Female ensemble and featured performer	Dainty Group
2013-2015	Wicked	Elphaba cover and ensemble	The Gordon Frost Organisation
2007	Dead Man Walking	Female ensemble	Andrew McManus Presents/Alexander Productions

=== Awards ===
Year	Award ceremony	Category	Role	Production	Result
2017	Helpmann Awards	Best Female Actor in a Musical	Lauren	Kinky Boots	Nominated
