= Anna Jennings-Edquist =

Australian lawyer and actress (born 1985)

- Born: Anna Jennings-Edquist; 13 April 1985 (age 41); Melbourne, Australia
- Occupations: Actress, lawyer
- Years active: 2002–present

Anna Jennings-Edquist (born 13 April 1985) is an Australian lawyer, actress, playwright and director in both theatre and television. Jennings-Edquist has written and directed several Australian university and festival productions and is known for her acting roles on the popular soap opera Neighbours.

== Career ==
Jennings-Edquist has acted in several television roles, most prominently in the soap opera Neighbours, in which she played the roles of Tahnee Coppin and Lisa Hayes. She wrote and directed The Throwback Players' 2006 production of Heat, and also directed the 2006 University of Melbourne Law Revue. She also appeared in The Pacific, "Ricketts Lane" and Lowdown on ABC1.

Since 2011, Jennings-Edquist has worked as a solicitor. She is Practice Leader at Slater and Gordon.

== Personal life ==
Jennings-Edquist's mother is Dr Gael Jennings, a science and medical journalist and current affairs presenter. Jennings-Edquist dated radio and TV celebrity Hamish Blake for five years until 2010. She has two sisters: Grace Jennings-Edquist, a writer and online reporter for the Australian Broadcasting Corporation, and Lola.

She is a graduate of the University of Melbourne, where she completed a Law/Arts degree and an honours degree. She graduated in 2010.

== Filmography ==
=== Television ===
Year	Title	Role	Run
2002	Short Cuts	Cute Girl #1	1 episode
2002	Neighbours	Tahnee Coppin	2002–2003 33 episodes
2009	Neighbours	Lisa Hayes	3 episodes
2010	The Pacific	Joyce	1 episode
2010	Lowdown	Sharne	8 episodes

=== Theatre ===
Year	Show	Role	Venue
2006	Heat	writer, director	University of Melbourne
2006	Law Revue	director	University of Melbourne
