= Waddingham (surname) =

Waddingham is an English surname derived from Waddingham, a village and civil parish in the West Lindsey district of Lincolnshire, England. Notable people with the surname include:

- Cindy Waddingham (born 1980), Australian actress
- Dorothea Waddingham (1899–1936), English murderer
- Gladys Waddingham (1900–1997), American writer
- Hannah Waddingham (born 1974), English actress and singer
