= Rats and Cats =

2006 Australian comedy film

- Directed by: Tony Rogers
- Written by: Adam Zwar; Jason Gann
- Starring: Adam Zwar; Jason Gann; Paul Denny; Anya Beyersdorf; Angus Sampson; Bert La Bonté
- Release date: 3 August 2006
- Running time: 88 minutes
- Country: Australia
- Language: English

Rats and Cats is a 2006 Australian comedy film.

== Plot ==
Rats and Cats is about a journalist tracking a former film and television star.

== Production ==
The film was directed by Tony Rogers and starring Adam Zwar and Jason Gann, the pair of whom also wrote the screenplay. The film was shot in Melbourne and country Victoria. The film is 88 minutes long.

== Cast ==
- Adam Zwar as Ben Baxter
- Jason Gann as Darren McWarren
- Paul Denny as Bruce
- Anya Beyersdorf as Cindy
- Angus Sampson as Robber
- Bert La Bonté as Teddy Taiwan

== Release ==
The film was released in cinemas on 15 May 2008, after it premiered at the Melbourne International Film Festival held at the Australian Centre for the Moving Image on 3 August 2006.

== Reception ==
David Stratton from At the Movies wrote, "RATS AND CATS is a sort-of comedy, very laid-back and meandering, and it's mostly content to explore life in this little town and some of its inhabitants." Vicky Roach of The Daily Telegraph wrote, "While Rats And Cats is an altogether different creature, it has the same strong sense of its own identity and the same authentic charm." Leigh Paatsch of the Herald Sun wrote, "Worth checking out if you're after something genuinely different." The Movie Show on SBS wrote about the film's characters, "Even better, the film boasts an enviably and uncommonly consistent tone, with supporting actors Anya Beyersdorf (as prostitute turned girlfriend, Cindy) and Paul Denny (as Darren’s brain-dead mate, Bruce) matching the high standard set by Gann and Zwar." Paul Byrnes of The Sydney Morning Herald wrote on its celebrity worship, "Rats And Cats seems to want to be taken half-seriously, as a commentary on the emptiness of celebrity worship, but it's hard to argue that from such a shaky comic foundation."
