= Agony aunts =

Agony aunts can refer to:

- Agony aunt, a colloquial term for an advice columnist
- Agony Aunts, a 2012 Australian comedy television series
- Agony Uncles, a 2012 Australian comedy television series
