= Wilfred (Australian TV series) =

Australian comedy television series

- Season 1 DVD cover art
- Genre: Black comedy
- Created by: Jason Gann; Adam Zwar
- Directed by: Tony Rogers
- Starring: Jason Gann; Adam Zwar; Cindy Waddingham
- Theme music composer: Sam Mallet
- Country of origin: Australia
- Original language: English
- No. of series: 2
- No. of episodes: 16 (list of episodes)

Production
- Executive producers: Joe Connor; Ken Connor
- Producer: Jenny Livingston
- Cinematography: David Stevens (2007); Germain McMicking (2010)
- Camera setup: Aaton Xterà (16mm)
- Running time: Approx. 25 minutes
- Production company: Renegade Films

Original release
- Network: SBS One
- Release: 19 March 2007 – 26 March 2010

Related
- Wilfred (American TV series)

Wilfred is an Australian comedy television series created by Adam Zwar, Jason Gann and Tony Rogers based on their award-winning 2002 short film. The story follows the lives of the eponymous dog Wilfred, his owner Sarah, and her boyfriend Adam, who sees Wilfred as a man in a dog suit. It was directed by Tony Rogers, produced by Jenny Livingston and stars Gann, Zwar and Cindy Waddingham.

Two series were broadcast on SBS One, the first in 2007 and the second in 2010. The series won three AFI Awards and was nominated for a Logie.

Independent Film Channel acquired the international broadcast rights to the original two series of Wilfred in 2010. An American remake premiered on the cable channel FX on 23 June 2011.

== Background ==
Wilfred's creators, longtime friends Jason Gann and Adam Zwar, met at the University of Southern Queensland in 1990, where Gann studied acting and Zwar studied journalism. Adam Zwar later met future co-star Cindy Waddingham and director Tony Rogers in September 2001 while filming a commercial for HBA health insurance (he was the buck-toothed client who sprayed the slogan "Three for free").

The idea that became Wilfred came from a late-night conversation between Gann and Zwar in November 2001. Zwar told of how he was invited back to the home of a young woman whose dog became suspicious and jealous of him. The pair began improvising a scenario between a man and a protective dog, and quickly realized the story was a great basis for a short film – they wrote a script that night. With a self-funded budget of A$4,000, they shot the seven-minute film the following week, and two months later it won Best Comedy at the 2002 Tropfest, with Gann additionally winning Best Actor. In January 2003, the film was shown at the Sundance Film Festival in Utah. Despite some reservations about Wilfred's brief use of the word "cunt", it was well received by the American audience.

After the success of the short, Zwar, Gann, and Rogers worked with Melbourne production team Renegade Films to extend the 7-minute short to a 20-minute pilot, merging the original footage seamlessly into new. Networks were initially unenthusiastic about the pilot – according to Rogers, "Wilfred was rejected by every television network twice". It was eventually picked up by Matt Campbell at SBS. Commissioning editor Debbie Lee offered the team unusually wide artistic freedom, saying "Go as far as you want – the more bent the better". Finally, the 25-minute pilot episode was completed in 2006, comprising material shot over five years.

== Production ==
The first series of Wilfred was shot in and around Richmond, Victoria, beginning in April 2006, with David Stevens as director of photography. It was shot in 16mm on a budget of A$1.6 million. Of this, $210,000 was provided by Film Victoria and $400,000 by the Australian Film Commission.

Film Victoria approved funding for a second series in early 2009. With Germain McMicking as director of photography, Wilfred II was shot in Kodak 16mm on an Aaton Xtera Super 16 using ARRI/Zeiss Ultra Prime lenses. Although he and director Tony Rogers considered using digital cameras, they were so happy with the film tests that they did not bother inquiring further about digital. The flexibility of film suited the production's modest budget and tight schedule. "Rebooting a RED camera isn’t something you want with actors under the lights in dog suits or in a taxing scene," said McMicking.

Series 2 was shot over eight weeks, finishing in August 2009. The second series also received federal funding, with Film Victoria contributing $294,048 and Screen Australia contributing $580,000.

== Cast ==
=== Main ===
Cast	Role
Adam Zwar	Adam
Cindy Waddingham	Sarah
Jason Gann	Wilfred
Kym Gyngell	Jack Underwood
Angus Sampson	Cyros
Damian Walshe-Howling	Keith
Kate Jenkinson	Caddy
Kestie Morassi	Kat
Josh Lawson	Spencer
David Field	Arthur

=== Guests ===
Cast	Role	Episode
Alex Menglet	Orpheous	1 episode
Angus Sampson	Cyros	1 episode
Damian Walshe-Howling	Keith	1 episode
Ditch Davey	Clarance	1 episode
Jessica Gower	Annika	1 episode
Kate Jenkinson	Caddy	1 episode
Kym Gyngell	Dr Jack Underwood	3 episodes
Paul Denny	Tony	1 episode
Samuel Johnson	Sam	1 episode

=== Crew ===
Crew	Job
Adam Zwar	Writer/Creator
Jason Gann	Writer/Creator
Tony Rogers	Director/Producer
Jenny Livingston	Producer
Joe Connor	Executive Producer
Sam Mallet	Music
David Stevens	Cinematographer
Richard Hamer	Film Editor
Rob Hornbuckle	Production Sound Mixer
Helen McGrath	Boom Operator
Mike Cowap	Project Manager
Paul Di Cintio	Location Manager

== Characters ==
=== Wilfred ===
Wilfred, Sarah's dog, is nine years old and 1/16th dingo (the rest is a mix of German Shepherd and Labrador). He is protective of his owner, and insecure and manipulative towards her boyfriends. He smokes cigarettes and marijuana, drinks beer, eats junk food, and is prone to foul language, malapropisms, and sexual urges. While Adam (and the viewer) sees Wilfred as a man in a dog suit, to everyone else he is just a normal dog. He has been described as "extremely smart for a dog, but pretty dumb for a human."

Little is revealed about Wilfred's past in the first series. It is implied that Sarah is not Wilfred's first owner, and that he served numerous stints at the pound before being adopted by her.

In the second series, this backstory was changed. It is revealed that Wilfred in fact grew up with Sarah and her parents in Nambour. His grumpy father Arthur still lives there, but his mother left when Wilfred was a pup. Wilfred was the runt of the litter; his only brother, Walter, became an army dog and was killed in the Iraq War. Arthur thinks his only surviving son is a disappointment and blames him for his mother leaving them. Wilfred has been estranged from his father since Sarah first moved to Melbourne.

=== Adam ===
Adam Douglas is an ordinary bloke from Ripponlea in Melbourne, Victoria. He works occasionally as a media monitor, but clients are scarce and he remains pretty much unemployed for the entire two seasons. He does not cause any trouble and trouble rarely comes his way – that is, until he meets Wilfred. His ability to talk to Wilfred at first leaves him nonplussed, but he soon accepts this as normal, and sometimes has trouble remembering that others do not see Wilfred the same way he does.

When Adam hooks up with Sarah, he is eager to please and to make their relationship work, but he has a love-hate relationship with Wilfred. Adam tries to be friends with Wilfred but usually – and ultimately – ends up being a victim of Wilfred's plots to sabotage his relationship with Sarah. Along the way, he always tries to do the right thing, but occasionally shows that he is capable of great evil.

Adam's parents were key witnesses in a murder trial when Adam was still at school; they were taken into a witness protection scheme. After some years of living with relatives and in foster care, Adam returned to the family home and brought up his younger brother Spencer on his own.

The character's last name was changed from Zavont to Douglas for the second series. This was done to incorporate a backstory that Adam was once caught masturbating at school, leading to the catchphrase "Tugga-dugga-dugga".

=== Sarah ===
Sarah Pickford is Wilfred's loving owner, an attractive yet foul-mouthed young woman with some kind of undisclosed day job; she has been called the "straight man" of the series. From Sarah's point of view, Wilfred is an actual dog, rather than a man in a dog suit. She believes that Wilfred likes Adam and naturally doesn't suspect her dog of the manipulative behaviour experienced by Adam. Sarah becomes increasingly financially supportive of Adam as the storyline progresses, bringing the house, car and most of the money to their relationship.

Sarah grew up in Nambour, Queensland, with her nudist parents. Her previous boyfriend, Mark, died in an accident, and most of the first series takes place in his house as Sarah and Wilfred continue to live there. At the end of the first season, Mark's will is contested and Sarah and Wilfred are forced to move out of the house.

== Overview ==
=== Series 1 ===
The first series comprised eight episodes running from 19 March to 7 May 2007, broadcast on SBS One in the Monday 10:00pm timeslot. Each episode follows the story about a girl named Sarah, her dog Wilfred, and her boyfriend, Adam. After their first date, Adam goes home with Sarah and meets her scruffy pet dog Wilfred, but Adam (as well as the audience) sees the latter as a human dressed in an unconvincing dog costume. The dog develops a grudge against his owner's new boyfriend and tests him to see if he is capable of being his new "daddy". At the same time, Wilfred sees Adam as a potential companion. It is the tension between these two competing desires that sets up much of the conflict of the series. According to Zwar, Wilfred is a story of Australian mateship: "...it's a story about two blokes; just one happens to be a dog".

=== Series 2 ===
Filming for the second series of Wilfred occurred in the second half of 2009. The series comprised eight episodes, also each Monday from 8 March to 26 April 2010, but in an earlier 9:00pm timeslot. The first episode finds the trio moving into a new house at 22 Dalziel St, Richmond. While the series begins with the familiar domestic dynamic that characterised the first series, the story quickly branches out to explore new settings, characters and tensions. When Adam decides to ask Sarah to marry him in the first episode, the impending wedding drives the story arc between one episode and the next in a manner quite different to the first series. It also explores themes of maturity that accompany marriage (such as meeting the parents, family holidays, being supportive, parenthood and financial trouble). The guest cast features many stars of Australian film, who enter the story in the form of "guest creatures" (also people in animal suits).

== Critical reception ==
=== Domestic ===
Wilfred received generally positive reviews, and surprised critics by winning the 2007 AFI Award for Best Comedy over The Chaser's War on Everything, despite achieving only a tenth of The Chaser's audience. Adam Zwar also won the award for Best Performance in a TV Comedy for his portrayal of Adam.

The series was widely praised for its original premise. Melinda Houston, writing in The Age, called Wilfred "a magnificent creation, magnificently realised", and that "operating from a deeply non-PC premise, Wilfred manages to be both broad and subtle, hilarious and creepy, utterly obvious and way-way-way left-field". Phillipa Hawker, also in The Age, called Wilfred "An entertaining mixture of character-based comedy and quiet absurdity". Natalie Craig from the Sydney Morning Herald compared the show favourably with another successful suburban comedy, saying "while Kath & Kim was straightforward suburban satire, Wilfred is a more complex beast that deserves a tasty snack for effort and originality".

Conversely, Jim Schembri of the Sydney Morning Herald called the concept "muddled", criticising the show for everything from its character development and humour to its 16:9 aspect ratio, and wondering "how a show as lame as this ever got on the air". Paul Kalina, writing in The Age, dismissed Wilfred as a "bogan show", saying of the decision to discontinue it after the second season "There's only so far the conceit can stretch and one senses that Gann and Zwar know this".

The show was criticised in March 2010 when the Herald Sun reported that up to A$1.5M of government money had been allocated to the production of a series "peppered with profanity, full-frontal nudity and jokes about rape". Family First Party Senator Steve Fielding accused the show of displaying "acts of bestiality". SBS responded to the criticism by stating that "The money that has been invested(...) is in no way outlandish. Wilfred would cost far less to make than your average drama."

=== International ===
Critical attention from international reviewers was rare until after the international release of the DVD boxset in mid-2012, well into the American version's second season. Many reviewers commented that it was surprisingly different to the American version, despite the near-identical premise and even the same lead actor. Reviews generally compared the show favourably to its American counterpart, noting its darker, edgier tone, and with most finding it funnier than the "toned-down" American version. Paul Mavis of DVD Talk (USA) praised the show's minimal exploration of the mental health themes so prominent in the American version: "The laughs are unfettered by some falsely reassuring framework of whether or not it's all real." However, Manny Lozano (VeryAware, USA) found that the lack of any explanation for Adam's apparent psychosis made the show less credible.

A particular point of difference with Australian reviewers was a recognition of the quality of all three, deeply flawed main characters. Kelly O'Neill (Rhythm Circus UK) called Wilfred "almost documentary-like in its ability to capture human and animal behaviour... The American version cannot hope to master [the original] if it places light comedy and attractive main stars over character development and the concept of dark comedy. Nick Aldwinckle of Cult Box (UK) similarly stated "Wilfred's real strength isn’t in its carefully unpredictable tone; it actually lies in the perfect characterisation of the three leads," and compared Wilfred to several much-loved British classics: "Ending after a mere 16 episodes, this is one of those rare sitcoms that join the likes of Fawlty Towers, I'm Alan Partridge and The Office in that esteemed 'two series of perfection' category."

=== Awards ===
Year	Result	Award	Category	Recipient(s)
2007	Won	AFI Award	Best Television Comedy Series	Jenny Livingston
2007	Won	AFI Award	Best Performance in Television Comedy	Adam Zwar
2007	Nominated	AFI Award	Best Performance in Television Comedy	Jason Gann
2007	Nominated	AFI Award	Best Direction in Television	Tony Rogers for "Dogs of War"
2008	Nominated	AWGIE Award	Comedy – Situation or Narrative	Adam Zwar and Jason Gann for "Dog Eat Dog"
2008	Nominated	Logie	Most Outstanding Comedy Program	
2010	Won	AFI Award	Best Screenplay in Television	Adam Zwar and Jason Gann for "Dog Star"
2010	Nominated	AFI Award	Best Television Comedy Series	Adam Zwar, Jason Gann, Tony Rogers and Jenny Livingston
2010	Nominated	Logie	Most Outstanding Light Entertainment Program	
2011	Nominated	Silver Logie	Most Outstanding Actor	Jason Gann

== International broadcasts ==
The broadcast rights to the original two seasons of Wilfred were purchased by IFC in 2010.

=== American version ===
In March 2010, Adam Zwar announced that the second series of Wilfred would be his last, as he was going off to work on the multi-award-winning Australian comedy series Lowdown. It was also revealed that the rights had been sold to the American production company Prospect Park, and that Jason Gann was in Los Angeles working on an American version of the series. In June 2010, cable channel FX announced that an American version of the series would air in June 2011. While FX indicated that there could be some changes to the scenarios and dialogue, producer Jenny Livingston offered the assurance that it would "still be our Wilfred".

The American series, produced by David Zuckerman (Family Guy, American Dad!) along with Gann (who also reprises his role as Wilfred), stars Elijah Wood as Ryan, a young man trying to find his way in the world. His suicide attempt at the beginning of the first episode is thwarted when his neighbour Jenna (Fiona Gubelmann) asks him to look after her dog. In contrast to the original series, the American version is more of a buddy comedy, and also delves into the question of whether Wilfred is real or just a figment of Ryan's imagination. Wilfred acts as a life mentor to Ryan, representing his unrepressed animalistic side; he has been described as "Brad Pitt to Ryan's Ed Norton".

The reception of the American version mirrored that in Australia, with the new show gaining a cult following. In October 2013, Wilfred was signed for a fourth and final season, the most of any international adaptation of an Australian series.

=== Russian version ===
In April 2012, Renegade Films signed a deal with Ukraine-based studio Star Media Group to adapt Wilfred for Russian and CIS television. The deal was finalised in October 2013 and production started in the same month, with the new show to be retitled Charlie. Star Media's plot synopsis indicates the 12-episode series will revolve around a young man named Nikita attempting to woo a woman who owns a dog named Charlie, but unfortunately Nikita and Charlie take an instant dislike to one another (suggesting the Russian version will be more similar to the original series than the American remake). The show will star Maksim Stetskov as Nikita, and Maksim Averin as Charlie.

== Home media ==
Wilfred was distributed on DVD in Australia by SBS and Madman Entertainment. Series 1 was released in April 2007, and Series 2 on 19 April 2010, both on 2-disc sets. A box-set of both series was released on 2 November 2011, under the title Wilfred: Dog Box.

In the UK, Fabulous Films released seasons 1 and 2 separately on DVD on 12 March 2012. They later released a 4-disc set under the title Wilfred: The Complete Original Australian Series on 20 August 2012. Both versions carried an 18 certificate.

In North America, Shout! Factory released the series on a 4-disc DVD set under the title Wilfred: The Complete Original Series on 4 June 2013.

== See also ==
- List of Australian television series
