= How to Talk Australians: The Movie =

2026 Australian comedy film

- Directed by: Tony Rogers
- Written by: Tony Rogers; Rob Hibbert
- Based on: How to Talk Australians
- Produced by: Jason Byrne; Victoria Schaw
- Starring: Eddie Baroo; Stephen Curry; Madeleine Dyer; Alison Fonseca
- Cinematography: Joseph Knox
- Edited by: Richard Hamer; Tim Parrington
- Music by: Adnan Laala; Karl Leeden
- Distributed by: Umbrella Entertainment
- Release dates: 11 June 2026 (Australia and New Zealand)
- Running time: 90 minutes
- Country: Australian
- Language: English

How to Talk Australians: The Movie is a 2026 Australian comedy film based on the YouTube series of the same name. It released on 11 June.

== Development ==
Production on the film began on 8 April 2023. While the film was being produced, it was known as How to Talk Australians: Highway to Hell and being produced in Melbourne. A trailer was released on 14 May 2026. Positive Ape was the production company for the film and Umbrella Entertainment distributed the film to cinemas. The film was released on 11 June.

== Plot ==
The film follows the students of the fictional Delhi College of Linguistics as they land in the regional town of Dubbo in New South Wales due to severe storms and their tour leader being detained by customs, despite this the group discover the 'real' Australia though they never travel to capital cities.

== Cast ==
The film stars actors such as Rohan Ganju, Ria Patel, Robert Santiago, Vikrant Narain, Shane Jacobson, Danielle Walker, Dave Lawson and Rick Davies.

== Reception ==
Jake Wilson from The Sydney Morning Herald gave the film one and a half out of five stars and said "Turning a YouTube phenomenon into a full-length feature is a risky enterprise at best."

Luke Buckmaster from Guardian Australia said of the film "There's an argument to say the film is a bit of a one-trick pony, but for me, that proverbial horse felt more like a mutant Godzilla-sized cow, with more than enough milk to keep squeezing. The shtick never got old" and awarded the film four out of five stars.

Peter Walkden of Walkden Entertainment awarded the film three out of five stars and said "Overall, How to Talk Australians: The Movie delivers a great comedy story packed with wacky, spoofy moments that Australians will find relatable, painfully accurate, and genuinely funny."
