= Nick Russell (actor) =

Australian actor

- Born: Melbourne, Victoria, Australia
- Occupations: Actor, producer, director
- Years active: 1999–present
- Spouse: Stephanie Russell
- Children: 3

Nicholas Russell is an Australian television actor, producer and director from Melbourne. Known professionally as Nick Russell, he began his career aged twelve when he starred in the Nine Network children's series Pig's Breakfast as Rodney Green. He studied science/law at university and took a job with a law firm which filled his time between acting roles which included guest parts on the soap opera Neighbours and the comedy drama series Sleuth 101.

When he decided to focus solely on acting, Russell began to secure numerous television roles during 2014. His most prominent role came as Gabe Reynolds on the Seven Network drama series Winners & Losers. In 2018, he played Brody Schneider in the Network Ten drama series Playing for Keeps. Aside from acting, Russell owns a production company.

== Early life ==
Russell wanted to become an actor during high school. He attended a private school and became the school captain. Russell's drama teacher had received a casting call for the Nine Network children's series Pig's Breakfast. He put Russell forward and he secured his first acting role aged twelve. He was then credited as Nicholas Russell.

After leaving school, Russell decided to study a double science and law degree at Monash University. In 2011, he took work at a law firm in Melbourne. Russell practised law because he needed a profession in case his acting career was unsuccessful. In 2012, Russell thought that his career in law had overshadowed his acting career and decided to solely concentrate on gaining roles.

Russell lives in Melbourne and is married to solicitor Stephanie Russell. They have three children together.

== Career ==
Russell appeared in three short films during the 2000s titled A World of His Own (2000), Soma (2007) and Signs (2008). His television roles following A Pig's Breakfast include Johnny Brightstar in Nine Network series The Saddle Club, David in My Brother Jack and a small role in Showcase drama Satisfaction. In 2007, he appeared as Caleb Maloney in the soap opera Neighbours. He later appeared as Cary in the 2010 ABC1 comedy series Sleuth 101.

After leaving his law career permanently, Russell secured many roles. He played Vincent Foster in ABC drama series The Doctor Blake Mysteries, Andrew Hodson in the Nine Network drama Fat Tony & Co. and Damian in the Australian comedy show Utopia. Russell then joined the cast of the Seven Network drama series Winners & Losers, playing Gabe Reynolds. The character was originally intended to be a small role in which Gabe would be a one-night stand of main character Jenny Gross (Melissa Bergland). Producers liked the chemistry between the two and made Gabe a permanent role in the series. Russell also secured a lead role in the television pilot titled Minimum Way as Tim. The show focuses on the poor running of a dysfunctional city bar.

In 2018, Russell secured the guest role of Brody Schneider in the Network Ten drama series Playing for Keeps. In August that year it was announced that Russell would be appearing in a new series titled Mr Black. He played the role of Fin Cruickshank and the series debuted on Network Ten in 2019. He then had a guest role in the prison drama Wentworth. In 2019, Russell appeared as Jeff in a sketch on The Yearly with Charlie Pickering. The following year he appeared as Jeremy Payne in the main series The Weekly with Charlie Pickering. In 2021, Russel played the role of Charlie in an episode of comedy-drama Spreadsheet. In 2022 he played a guest role in ABC's anthology comedy series, Summer Love and in 2023, Russell played Young Douglas in their crime drama show, Bay of Fires. In 2025, Russell's CV was updated announcing a new Neighbours role.

Russell co-owns a production company called "Tandem Media" alongside screen writer Nick Musgrove. Russell has served as a director for projects created by Tandem Media. He is also part of a comedy sketch production company known as "The Peloton", which includes himself, Musgrove, Tim McDonald, Tom Peterson and Vachel Spirason.

== Filmography ==
| Year | Title | Role | Notes |
|---|---|---|---|
| 1999–2000 | Pig's Breakfast | Rodney Green | Lead role |
| 2001 | The Saddle Club | John Brightstar | Guest role |
| 2001 | My Brother Jack | David | TV film |
| 2003 | A World of His Own | Jason | Short film |
| 2007 | Neighbours | Caleb Maloney | Recurring role |
| 2007 | Satisfaction | Private School Boy #2 | Guest role |
| 2008 | Signs | Jason | Short film |
| 2010 | Sleuth 101 | Cary | Guest role |
| 2014 | The Doctor Blake Mysteries | Vincent Foster | Guest role |
| 2014 | Fat Tony & Co. | Andrew Hodson | Guest role |
| 2014 | Utopia | Damian | Guest role |
| 2014 | Minimum Way | Tim | TV movie |
| 2014–2016 | Winners & Losers | Gabe Reynolds | Regular role |
| 2017 | True Story with Hamish & Andy | Neighbour | Guest role |
| 2018–2019 | Playing for Keeps | Brody Schneider | Recurring role |
| 2019 | Mr Black | Fin Cruickshank | Regular role |
| 2019 | Wentworth | Registrar | Guest role |
| 2019 | The Yearly with Charlie Pickering | Jeff | Guest role |
| 2020 | The Weekly with Charlie Pickering | Jeremy Payne | Guest role |
| 2021 | Spreadsheet | Charlie | Guest role |
| 2022 | Summer Love | Dad | Guest role |
| 2023 | Bay of Fires | Young Douglas | Guest role |
| 2025 | Neighbours | Trent Yates | Guest role |
| 2025 | Play Dirty | Bank Supervisor | |
