= A Place to Call Home season 6 =

Season of Australian television series

A Place to Call Home
- Season 6
- No. of episodes: 10

Release
- Original network: Showcase
- Original release: 19 August – 21 October 2018

Season chronology
- ← Previous; Season 5

The sixth and final season (also known as A Place to Call Home: The Final Chapter) of the Seven Network television series A Place to Call Home premiered on Showcase 19 August 2018. The series is produced by Chris Martin-Jones, and executive produced by Penny Win and Julie McGauran.

== Production ==
On 6 December 2017, Foxtel announced that A Place to Call Home had been renewed for a sixth season. It was later announced, on 19 March 2018 that the 10-episode sixth season would be the series' last.

Production on the sixth season began on 19 March 2018.

Of the show's return, Foxtel's Executive Director of Television, Brian Walsh stated, "Simply put, A Place to Call Home is one of the finest pieces of drama ever produced for Australian television. The series will be long remembered for its captivating narrative, outstanding performances and world class production values. Foxtel is proud to have been its home for the past four seasons and there is no doubt that it will be missed. A Place to Call Home was a series which was saved by its fans and so the journey of this, the final chapter, is a very important one. It was imperative for us that the series retain its integrity and that we would bring the series to a close at its natural story point and that is what everyone who loves the show can expect."

Foxtel's Head of Drama, Penny Win stated, "At Foxtel we have loved bringing this series to audiences and we know that it will be a beautiful closing chapter created by Bevan Lee, and the amazing cast and crew."

Seven's Head of Drama, Julie McGauran stated, "Seven Studios is once again delighted to partner with Foxtel to bring this stunning series to a defining and memorable ending."

The series' Script Executive, Bevan Lee stated "Season 6 truly completes my vision for the series. I promise to bring the show to its finale on a wave of tears, laughter and most importantly, closure."

== Plot ==
Season six takes place in 1959.

== Cast ==
=== Main ===
- Marta Dusseldorp as Sarah Bligh
- Noni Hazelhurst as Elizabeth Goddard
- Brett Climo as George Bligh
- Craig Hall as Dr. Jack Duncan
- David Berry as James Bligh
- Abby Earl as Anna Bligh
- Arianwen Parkes-Lockwood as Olivia Bligh
- Sara Wiseman as Carolyn Duncan
- Tim Draxl as Dr. Henry Fox
- Deborah Kennedy as Doris Collins
- Dominic Allburn as Harry Polson
- Frankie J. Holden as Roy Briggs

=== Recurring & Guest ===
- Elliot Domoney as David Bligh
- Madeleine Clunies-Ross as Leah Gold
- Conrad Coleby as Matthew Goddard
- Clodagh Crowe as Dawn Briggs

== Episodes ==
No. overall	No. in season	Title	Directed by	Written by	Original release date	Australian viewers (millions)
58	1	"For Better or Worse"	Jeremy Sims	Bevan Lee	19 August 2018	142,000
Four months after their trip to an Israeli kibbutz, Sarah and George announce that they're married and exchange vows in front of their friends and family. James and Harry return to Ash Park, infuriating Henry. Carolyn receives a surprising job offer. Anna hides her pregnancy from Henry. Olivia decides to tell Matt the truth about Georgie's parentage. Stan is hired at Ash Park. Henry self-medicates after confronting James. Elizabeth struggles with the imminent changes at Ash Park now she is no longer the mistress. Dawn's water breaks and after undergoing a caesarean, she and the baby die.
59	2	"Salt of the Earth"	Jeremy Sims	Bevan Lee	26 August 2018	108,000
Carolyn accepts James' job offer with Jack's blessing, unaware her new boss is her former lover, Delia. Doris and Sarah break the news to Dawn's daughter Emma that her mother has died. Roy moves into Ash Park after finding it difficult to return home. Anna decides to return to Sydney with Matt and Olivia. Sheila takes the children and leaves after informing the police about Stan. Elizabeth begins to question the changing values of the world. Jack refuses to accept Henry's resignation. Sarah and George finally settle into marital bliss. A drunken Stan drives off after Henry swerves to miss him and crashes.
60	3	"Darkness and Light"	Catherine Millar	Bevan Lee	2 September 2018	104,000
The town gathers for Dawn's funeral, but Roy is nowhere to be seen. Henry is depressed as he convalesces in Inverness hospital, despite the support of both Jack and Harry. Sarah tracks down Roy, helping him with his grieving but Emma is still angry with him. Matt, Olivia, and Anna return to the Goddard home in Sydney, only to find no privacy possible. James has a frank discussion with Matt about his plans. Jack notices something on the ground near Ash Park, leading him to believe who may be person responsible behind Henry's accident. Anna gets good news regarding her novels. Carolyn leaves for Sydney, meeting James's interior decorator contact, Delia, who happens to be someone from Carolyn's past. Olivia is angered by Matt's actions, leading to a confrontation about their future together. Sarah holds her first Shabbat at Ash Park but Elizabeth chooses to pass. Matt asks Elizabeth for a favour.
61	4	"Against the Tide"	Catherine Millar	Katherine Thomson	9 September 2018	115,000
Roy continues to grieve on his own. Jack and George reveal their theory about Henry's accident to Sarah. Doris tries to act as matchmaker for Harry. Harry finally addresses Henry's rudeness toward him. Stan is infuriated after catching Roy and George in an act of deception regarding the accident. Elizabeth tries to act as conciliator between Matt and Olivia, where their relationship is still tense. Anna's return to Ash Park is greeted by anger from both George and Jack but glee from Henry. Matt and Olivia go ahead with Matt's plan. Prudence hires Carolyn and Delia to improve the interiors of the Swanson home.
62	5	"Look Not in My Eyes"	Amanda Brotchie	Katherine Thomson	16 September 2018	128,000
Matt gets ahold of Georgie’s biological mother but Olivia insists just she and Elizabeth meet her. Sarah and Doris are threatened by Stan’s mates regarding the women’s clinic. Henry and Jack are at odds about the new surgeon candidate, Neil Burton. Emma asks Doris to take her to Ash Park so she could talk with Roy. After a confrontation with Jack, Henry makes an impulsive decision. James, Carolyn, and Delia celebrate the formation of their new business. After finding out the reason why Georgie was given away, Olivia makes a firm decision about her relationship with Matt, which Elizabeth endorses. Harry comes upon a despondent Henry.
63	6	"Staring Down the Barrel"	Amanda Brotchie	Bevan Lee	23 September 2018	118,000
Harry calls for Sarah to help Henry. Matt and Elizabeth have a final conversation. The hospital board delivers bad news for Jack. A confused Stan arrives at the women's clinic looking for his wife, concerning Jack that he may have injured. Olivia and Anna take Georgie and David to get away for a bit, reliving old times. Sarah has a tense confrontation with a rifle-toting Stan, before things take a turn for the worse. Olivia decides to take Georgie to go see James at Cap Ferrat. Doris volunteers to find Henry after Jack requires help to stabilize a critical patient, only to be shocked to find him with Harry. Jack tells both Henry and Carolyn he has made a decision about his future. A shell-shocked Sarah abruptly drives off, giving no indication where she is going.
64	7	"New Adventures"	Jeremy Sims	Bevan Lee	30 September 2018	89,000
George tracks down Sarah at a place for comfort. Elizabeth dabbles in frippery, who later urges Jack to pitch his idea about innovating medical services in Inverness. Both Sarah and Roy talk to Doris about what she saw Harry and Henry doing. Neil Burton is unimpressed by Jack's proposal but confides to Henry about his plans to undermine Jack, angering Henry. Anna continues to work on pitching an adaptation for her novel when she finds out there is now movie studio competition interested in them. Elizabeth arrives at Ash Park with her new look. Jack announces his plans to the family, quietly upsetting Carolyn. Prudence offers Henry a place to stay. Roy makes an offer to Harry, who is unsure to accept due to a particular external factor. Sarah finally explains to George the root of her recent mood and her latest role. Anna detects Carolyn's anguish about Jack's future. Olivia gives Roy a heartfelt present. Carolyn says goodbye to Jack from the rear view mirror of her car, possibly for good.
65	8	"Autumn Affairs"	Jeremy Sims	Bevan Lee	7 October 2018	108,000
Jack starts to implement his changes for the clinic, concerning Doris. Anna chooses to be stubborn about her situation with her publisher and visiting movie studio representatives, no matter how much Carolyn tries. Prudence throws a lavish party at her home. Henry comforts Anna about how she will be perceived at the party. Elizabeth invites Neil Burton under false pretences so that Jack can give his ultimatum. George tells Sarah about his plans for the future, prompting Sarah to find a way to decide which life option to take. Jack gets an utter shock on his way to tell Carolyn all the good news.
66	9	"Life Longs for Itself"	Catherine Millar	Katherine Thomson	14 October 2018	99,000
Set four months after the previous episode, Jack and Carolyn have gone their separate ways. Anna's abandoned book Tender Vines gets a new life as a radio serial. Sarah tries to reason with Jack, who has chosen to shut everybody out. Olivia returns with Georgie to Sydney to finalize her divorce from James. Elizabeth reveals her philanthropic plans of setting up a maternity home for single and unwed mothers. Olivia gives Prudence extraordinary news about her son. As Olivia's divorce is finalized, Anna goes into labour but still insists on giving birth in Inverness to bring Jack and Carolyn back together. Sarah and Harry drive from Inverness to intercept Anna, Olivia, and Elizabeth, finding them in an orchard with Anna ready to give birth. Henry meets Harry to tell him of his plans about both his career and their relationship. George gives Sarah an early present to celebrate the new year 1960. Anna has a naming ceremony for her baby, Elaine Elizabeth Bligh, which moves Elizabeth. Jack's new clinic initiative gets off to a slow start, then gets a wake-up call from Delia about Carolyn. Sarah confronts Jack one last time, trying to relate their wartime experiences and contrasting how they have chosen to individually deal with the aftermath.
67	10	"Reaching Home"	Catherine Millar	Bevan Lee	21 October 2018	128,000
The series finale episode focuses on events happening in the week between Christmas day 1959 and New Year's Day 1960. On Christmas Day, George and Sarah host a party for many of their friends and family, including Elizabeth, Roy, Doris, Jack, and a visiting Frank Gibbs. At Prudence's home, a smaller contingent gathers, including Carolyn, Anna, Olivia, Andrew, Delia, Henry, and Harry. All of the Bligh's family and friends are happy with the new directions their lives are taking, with the exception of Jack and Carolyn, who are both miserable. During the lead-up to the new year, a number of significant changes occur. George, Sarah, and David prepare for Israel. Jack decides to go to Burma to reflect on his wartime service. Carolyn suddenly returns to Inverness to confront Jack and asks to go with him to Burma. Elizabeth confides in Sarah that she has been diagnosed with a terminal illness. Delia leaves Prudence as all the interior design work has been completed in the Swanson home. As the new year dawns, Harry and Henry profess their love for each other, while Jack finally accepts Carolyn's olive branch. The final scene at the dawn of 1960 is succeeded by a series of shots wrapping up the characters' stories: Elizabeth passed in her sleep in 1963. Her chosen epitaph was "Life is a blessing. To die fulfilled an even greater one."; Roy was invaluable to Ash Park and to the Dawn Briggs Community Clinic, until his death in 1975.; Lucky yipped his last bark at age 17, head on Roy's lap.; Emma becomes an obstetrician. "She saved many, as her mother had not been saved."; Doris marries a new employee of Ash Park. "She had twenty married years, being loved as she deserved."; Leah marries Larry. Their daughter marries Frank Gibbs' son.; Jack and Carolyn are shown travelling to Burma. Carolyn later becomes Inverness's first female MP. Jack received an Order of Australia for his services to rural medicine. "They died within days of each other. Their loved indeed lasted forever."; Anna lived happily, but never remarried. "She had one daughter and many children -- born through her writing."; James and Olivia stayed close until his death from AIDS in 1986.; Georgie became a championship surfer, before joining James' business in Europe.; Andrew proved worthy of Olivia's love and they remain married until his death.; Henry and Harry remain together and marry each other in January 2018 after Australia legalizes same-sex marriage, both by then in their nineties.; George passes away at the age of eighty. "His whole life proved that decency is not a weakness."; David became master of Ash Park.; The final scene is of Sarah's death at the age of 104, surrounded by David, Olivia, and Leah. On her nightstand is a copy of a book entitled A Place to Call Home, written by a Samantha Swanson, Andrew and Olivia's granddaughter.

== Ratings ==
No.	Title	Air date	Viewers	Rank
1	"For Better or Worse"	19 August 2018	142,000	6
2	"Salt of the Earth"	26 August 2018	108,000	8
3	"Darkness and Light"	2 September 2018	104,000	5
4	"Against the Tide"	9 September 2018	115,000	4
5	"Look Not in My Eyes"	16 September 2018	128,000	3
6	"Staring Down the Barrel"	23 September 2018	118,000	1
7	"New Adventures"	30 September 2018	89,000	5
8	"Autumn Affairs"	7 October 2018	108,000	8
9	"Life Longs for Itself"	14 October 2018	99,000	1
10	"Reaching Home	21 October 2018	128,000	6
