= Pig's Breakfast =

Television series

- Also known as: Off the Air
- Genre: Children's; Science fiction
- Created by: John Thomson; Mark Shirrefs
- Written by: Mark Shirrefs; John Thomson; Lynda Gibson; Kym Goldsworthy; Steve J. Spears; Kevin Nemeth; Phil Thomson; Brendan Luno; Geoff Kelso; Clare Madsen; Holly Lyons; Rhett Walton; Helen Steel; John Lind; Sue Thomson; Brian Nankervis; Andrew Goodone; Mark Cutler; Nancy Black
- Directed by: Esben Storm; Kathy Mueller; Ralph Strasser; John Thomson
- Starring: Nicholas Russell; Eve Morey; Heath McIvor; Jennifer Priest
- Country of origin: Australia
- Original language: English
- No. of seasons: 2
- No. of episodes: 78

Production
- Executive producer: Noel Price
- Producer: Susie Campbell
- Production locations: Melbourne, Victoria
- Running time: 25 minutes
- Production companies: Southern Star Entertainment; Nine Network Australia

Original release
- Network: Nine Network
- Release: 5 July 1999 – 22 October 2000

Pig's Breakfast (also known as Off the Air) is an Australian science fiction children's comedy television series created by Mark Shirrefs and John Thomson that aired from 5 July 1999 to 22 October 2000.

== Premise ==
Two alien school kids named Grob and Meeba accidentally crash their galactic school bus into a television studio on Earth, Channel 9. A producer mistakes them for two actors in rubber suits, there to do a skit on her children's TV show. The aliens are such a hit that she hires them to host the show, whose ratings soar. Two children, Rodney and Lucy Green, discover the aliens' identity and help to keep them safe while they try to fix their bus and return home.

== Cast ==
=== Main ===
- Eve Morey as Lucy Green
- Dean Measor as Plaaag Warrior
- Nicholas Russell as Rodney Green
- Catherine Mack-Hancock as Jessica
- Sally Cooper as Dee Davis
- Heath McIvor as Grob
- Jennifer Priest as Meeba
- George Kapiniaris as Queegle (voice)
- Phillip Millar as Queegle (puppetry)

=== Guests ===
- Annie Jones as Sue Green
- Ernie Gray as Mr. Pratt
- Francis Greenslade as Martin Green
- Gary Files as Mr. Howard
- Geoff Paine as Malcolm Wilson
- Jeremy Hopkins as Phillip Bailey
- Jeremy Kewley as Gavin Bailey
- Kate Gorman
- Lynda Gibson as Di Bailey
- Monica Maughan
- Paul Mercurio
- Peta Brady as Nancy
- Rebecca Ritters as Caz
- Sophie Heathcote
- Sullivan Stapleton
- Tania Lacy as Rebecca
- Terry Norris

== Production ==
Shirrefs and Thomson originally conceived Pig's Breakfast in 1989 as a magazine series about aliens who crash-land on Earth and interview humans to learn more about the planet. The premise was changed to suit a sitcom format ten years later. After they pitched it, the Nine Network and production company Southern Star Entertainment made a deal to co-produce 52 episodes without commissioning a pilot.

The television studio scenes were filmed in and around the Richmond studios of GTV-9 Melbourne.

== International broadcast ==
The series aired in many countries, including ITV's CITV in the United Kingdom and RTÉ2's The Den in Ireland.
