= Cindy Waddingham =

Australian actress

Cindy Joy Waddingham (born 8 April 1980) is an Australian television and film actress. She is best known for her role as Sarah in the Australian black comedy series Wilfred (2007) and the award-winning 2002 short film of the same name on which the series is based. Other appearances include Caitlin in the 2010 romantic comedy I Love You Too, and Andrea in the comedy series Lowdown (2010).

Waddingham has several roles alongside Adam Zwar, whom she met while filming a commercial for HBA Health Insurance in 2001 (Zwar was the buck-toothed client who sprayed the slogan "three for free").
