= Grace Jennings-Edquist =

Australian writer and journalist

Grace Jennings-Edquist is an Australian writer, ABC reporter, and former senior editor at Mamamia.

== Career ==
In 2013, Jennings-Edquist appeared as herself on conversational-style Australian television program The Agony Of..., where she addressed the issue of sexual harassment.

In 2017, while living in New York, Jennings-Edquist co-launched her own feminist online newsletter 'To Her Door', targeting Australian millennial women. In 2019, Jennings-Edquist achieved industry recognition through the Michael Gordon Social Justice Fellowship, which led to an ABC Life series exploring the lives of refugees in regional Australia.

== Personal life ==
Jennings-Edquist's mother is Australian journalist, ABC TV presenter and author Gael Jennings. Her sister is Australian lawyer and actress Anna Jennings-Edquist.
