= Puven Pather =

Australian film director

Puvan Pather
- Born: Durban, South Africa
- Occupations: Stunt performer, Actor, Director
- Years active: 1990–present
- Spouse(s): Jessica Gower (2004–present; 1 child)

Puven Pather is an Australian film director, screenwriter, actor and stunt performer born in South Africa.

Puven has been married to actress Jessica Gower since 2004, and the couple have a daughter named Sequoia.

== Career ==
Pather came to Australia at the age of nine from Durban, South Africa. He began his film career at the age of 16, as a stunt performer in Melbourne. He has been a professional stunt performer and stunt coordinator since 1990. As a stunt performer, he has performed such stunts as high falls, water work (scuba), air rams, rock climbing, rigging, ski/snowboarding, full body torches, driving, fights, car hits, crash bangs and more. His credits include Superman, Ghost Rider and Charlotte's Web.

He has been an actor in films since 1995, often performing his own stunts.

He is a directing graduate of the Australian Film, Television and Radio School (AFTRS), where he gained recognition and won awards for his work as a Director. His directorial debut was with the films The Shot and The Visitor. As part of the Slamdance Film Festival, The Shot had its US premiere at American Cinematheque on 20 August 2003, at the Egyptian Theater. It was shown at the Tampere International Short Film Festival, Finland, 5–9 March 2003, the 29th Seoul Independent Film Festival, and the AFTRS National screening tour.

However, Pather is most known for Neighbours episode 7591, where he places a stunt double.

== Awards ==
He won "Best New Director" for The Shot, at the 20th annual St Kilda Film Festival in Melbourne, where he also won both "Best Fiction" and "Best Achievement with An Original Screenplay" for his work The Visitor.

The Shot then won "Best Film" at the "Spanischer Kurzfilm Sieger bei Festival" (Spanish Film festival) in Berlin. and "First Prize" at the 2003 Australian Shorts Film Festival.

== Reviews ==
Current offered of The Shot:

This is a very good, tightly shot, short film that anyone into vanguard photojournalism should watch. Cinematography and direction are well executed and the story is succinctly sharp.

== Credits ==
=== Director ===
| Year | Film | Duration |
|---|---|---|
| 2001 | Waterbabies | Short film (6 minutes) |
| 2002 | The Shot | Short film (10 minutes) |

=== Actor ===
| Year | Film or Series | Character |
|---|---|---|
| 2008 | Rush | Boy |
| 2001 | Lantana | Drug dealer |
| 1999 | Tribe | Curly |
| 1999 | BeastMaster | Ishmael |
| 1999 | Stingers | Hector Gueteres |
| 1998 | Gargantua | Naru |
| 1997 | Mr. Nice Guy | Giancarlo's Man |
| 1995 | Tunnel Vision | Youth |

=== Stuntman ===
| Year | Film or Series | Role |
|---|---|---|
| 2009 | Beautiful Kate | stunt driver |
| 2009 | Knowing | stunts |
| 2007 | Ghost Rider | utility stunts |
| 2006 | Charlotte's Web | safety assistant |
| 2006 | Superman Returns | utility stunts |
| 2005 | The Great Raid | stunt performer |
| 2005 | The Alice | stunt double |
| 2003 | Peter Pan | stunt double |
| 2003 | The Matrix Revolutions | stunts |
| 2002 | Garage Days | stunts |
| 2002 | The Crocodile Hunter: Collision Course | stunt safety driver |
| 2001 | Invincible | stunts |
| 2001 | Lantana | stunt performer |
| 2000 | Green Sails | stunt performer |
| 2000 | Water Rats | stunt performer |
| 1999 | Noah's Ark | stunt performer |
| 1999 | Little White Lies | utility stunts |
| 1998 | The Lost World | stunt performer |
| 1998 | The Violent Earth | stunt performer |
| 1998 | Search for Treasure Island | stunt double |
| 1998 | Beverly Hills Family Robinson | water safety |
| 1998 | Moby Dick | stunt performer |
| 1998 | Tales of the South Seas | stunt double |
| 1997 | Joey | stunts |
| 1997 | True Love and Chaos | stunt double |
| 1997 | 20,000 Leagues Under the Sea | stunt performer |
| 1997 | Mr. Nice Guy | stunt performer |
| 1997 | The Place of the Dead | assistant stunt rigger |
| 1996 | Medivac | stunt assistant |
| 1996 | Acri | stunt performer |
| 1996 | Who Dares Wins | stunt assistant |
| 1996 | Water Rats | utility stunts |
| 1996 | Police Story 4: First Strike | stunt performer |
| 1996 | Pacific Drive | stunt assistant |
| 1996 | The Wayne Manifesto | utility stunts |
| 1995 | Tunnel Vision | stunt performer |
| 1995 | Silver Strand | stunt double |
| 1994 | Ocean Girl | stunt double |
| 1994 | Blue Heelers | stunt assistant |
| 1993 | Time Trax | stunt performer |
| 1990 | Bony | utility stunts |
