= Tunnel Vision (1995 film) =

1995 Australian film by Clive Fleury

- Directed by: Clive Fleury
- Written by: Clive Fleury
- Produced by: Phillip Avalon
- Starring: Patsy Kensit; Robert Reynolds; Rebecca Rigg; Gary Day; Shane Briant
- Release date: 1995
- Running time: 92 minutes
- Country: Australia
- Language: English
- Budget: $2.5 million

Tunnel Vision is a 1995 Australian mystery thriller film directed by Clive Fleury and starring Patsy Kensit, Robert Reynolds, Rebecca Rigg, and Shane Briant.

== Cast ==
- Patsy Kensit as Kelly Wheatstone
- Robert Reynolds as Frank Yanovitch
- Rebecca Rigg as Helena Martinelli
- Shane Briant as Inspector Bosey
- Gary Day as Steve Docherty
- Justin Monjo as Craig Breslin
- David E. Woodley as David De Salvo
- Liz Burch as Mrs. Leyton
- Jonathan Hardy as Henry Adams
- Paul Denny as Driver
- Puven Pather as Youth
- Gennie Nevinson as Club Owner

== Production ==
The film was shot in Queensland from 14 February to 20 March 1994 but was not released theatrically and was not released on video until 1996.
