= Adam Zwar =

Australian actor, voice artist and writer (born 1972)

- Born: 13 January 1972 (age 54); Cairns, Queensland, Australia
- Other name: Adam Zwarr
- Notable work: Alex Burchill on Lowdown; Adam Douglas on Wilfred; The Wedding Party; Rats and Cats
- Spouse: Amanda Brotchie (m. 2003; died 2025)

Comedy career
- Years active: 1990s–present
- Medium: Film, television

Adam Zwar (born 13 January 1972) is an Australian actor, voice artist and writer. He is best known for co-creating the Australian comedy series Squinters, Lowdown and Wilfred and also creating the Ten Network comedy Mr. Black as well as the popular factual series Agony Aunts, Agony Uncles, The Agony of Life, The Agony of Modern Manners and Agony. Zwar also presented and produced seminal cricket documentaries Underarm: The Ball That Changed Cricket and Bodyline: The Ultimate Test which took a forensic look at the infamous 1932–1933 Ashes series between Australia and England.

== Early life ==
Zwar was born on 13 January 1972 in Cairns, Queensland, where he was also raised. His parents bought the family home from actor Leo McKern. Zwar is the son of author Desmond Zwar, who wrote the best-selling book The Loneliest Man in the World about Rudolf Hess. Zwar's mother, Delphine, was a long-time writer for the House and Garden magazine.

From the age of twelve, Zwar attended Smithfield High School and then Brisbane Grammar School, where he was captain of the cross-country team in his senior year. After high school he completed a journalism degree at the University of Southern Queensland in Toowoomba. He subsequently began studying acting. He undertook a journalism cadetship at The Cairns Post and subsequently moved to Melbourne to work for the Sunday Herald Sun.

After some time working at the Sunday Herald Sun, Zwar decided to pursue his interest in the film industry. In 1997, he left his full-time journalism job to do two jobs - as a freelance journalist and freelance actor. He performed in theatre and numerous television commercials and had guest roles in Neighbours, Blue Heelers and Sea Change. Each year, Zwar would save a portion of his income (usually around $A4000) and use it to produce a short film.

== Career ==
After guest appearances in several Australian television shows in the late 1990s, Adam co-wrote, produced and co-starred in the short film Wilfred in 2002 and then went on to co-create and co-star in the television series Wilfred, screened on SBS in 2007. Later that year, he won the AFI Award for Best Performance in a Television Comedy. After a second season on Wilfred, Adam collaborated with Amanda Brotchie, to create the popular comedy Lowdown, which went on to win Best Television Comedy Screenplay at the Australian Writers Guild Awards (AWGIES) in 2010 and 2012. Lowdown would also win Best Television Comedy at the 2013 AACTA Awards.

More recently, he has created the successful Agony series for ABC, featuring some of Australia's funniest and brightest comedians and social commentators. In 2012, Agony Uncles premiered, followed by Agony Aunts, The Agony of Life, The Agony of Christmas and then in 2014 The Agony of Modern Manners and The Agony of the Mind. In 2015, the series returned with Agony. Agony Aunts won Best Light Entertainment Television Series at the 2013 AACTA Awards. In 2017, Adam co-created the series, Squinters with Trent O'Donnell and in 2018, created Mr. Black for the Ten Network. He has also written six episodes of Austin for the ABC. In 2021, he released his memoir Twelve Summers.

Adam also co-wrote and co-starred in the movie Rats and Cats, which premiered to sell-out audiences and critical acclaim at the 2006 Melbourne International Film Festival and went on to screen at the SXSW Film Festival in 2009. From 2006 to 2010, he was head writer on the AFI Awards screened on the Nine Network, working alongside hosts Geoffrey Rush and Stephen Curry. Zwar's other acting credits include playing Martin Gero in Series 1 of 2 of the Network Ten crime drama Rush, as well as the SBS series Carla Cametti PD, the ABC television movie Valentine's Day, the crime drama Underbelly for Channel Nine. In 2016, Zwar joined the main cast of Foxtel's drama Top of the Lake and in 2023, played a leading role in the crime series, Scrublands for STAN.

Zwar's other screen-acting credits include both seasons of the Network Ten sketch comedy series The Wedge, Blue Heelers, Stingers, CrashBurn, SeaChange, BackBerner, Foxtel's drama Tangle and MDA. His stage-acting credits include Kissing for Australia, for which he received a Green Room Award nomination, and Cyrano de Bergerac for the Melbourne Theatre Company.

He has also written the plays Kissing for Australia, Primrose Hill, The Inner Sanctum and The Fall and Fall of Jeremy Hawthorn.

Zwar is one of Australia's leading voice-over artists lending his voice to Ford, Australia Post, ISelect, the Herald Sun, Honda, HBA, Boag's, RACV, Bundaberg Rum, AHM and Blackmores.

== Personal life ==
Zwar was married to Amanda Brotchie, an AFI award-winning filmmaker, from 2003 until her death from cancer in 2025.

== Writing credits ==
Year	Title	Type	Other notes
1994	The Fall and Fall of Jeremy Hawthorn	Play	
2002	Wilfred	Film	Short, co-written with Jason Gann
2005	The Inner Sanctum	Play	
2006–2007	Rats and Cats	Film	Co-written with Jason Gann
2008	Kissing for Australia	Play	
2008	Primrose Hill	Play	
2010–2012	Lowdown	TV series	Co-creator with Amanda Brotchie; executive producer; writer - 15 episodes
2007–2010, 2011–2014	Wilfred	TV series	Co-creator with Jason Gann and Tony Rogers; writer - 16 episodes
2012–2015	Total Agony	TV series documentary	Host; director; executive producer; writer - 34 episodes
2017	No Activity	TV series	Co-writer with Trent O'Donnell and Patrick Brammall - episode "The Crow"
2019	Mr. Black	TV series	Creator; executive producer; writer - 8 episodes
2018–2019	Squinters	TV series	Co-creator with Trent O'Donnell; executive producer; head writer - 12 episodes
2022	Darby and Joan	TV series	writer - 1 episode
2024-2025	Austin	TV series	writer - 7 episodes

== Acting credits ==
=== Television ===
Year	Title	Role	Other notes
1998	Neighbours	Mark Billings	2 episodes
1999–2000	SeaChange	Const. George Velos	4 episodes
1999–2001	Stingers	Reuben/Grubby Kane	2 episodes
1998–2002	Blue Heelers	Mike Schneider/Arnie Violet	2 episodes
2003	CrashBurn	Tat	Episode "One Hundred Years of Solitude"
2002–2005	MDA	Peter Munro	5 episodes
2006–2007	The Wedge	Various characters	48 episodes
2008	Underbelly	Gregg Hildebrandt	Episode "Team Purana"
2008	Bogan Pride	Mr. Laffer	2 episodes
2009	Carla Cametti PD	Hank	Episode "In Sickness and in Health"
2008–2009	Rush	Martin Gero	2 episodes
2007–2010	Wilfred	Adam Douglas/Detective Delaney	16 episodes
2010	Tangle	Huey Moss	2 episodes
2011	The Match Committee	Adam Harrington	3 episodes
2011	Some Say Love	Various characters	Episode "Pilot"
2012	Howzat! Kerry Packer's War	Peter McFarline	2 episodes
2012	Rake	Bob Oakley	Episode "R vs Alford"
2010–2012	Lowdown	Alex Burchill	16 episodes
2014	Party Tricks	Trevor Bailey	6 episodes
2015	The Beautiful Lie	Comedy Host	Episode "#1.2"
2016	The Doctor Blake Mysteries	Herbert Jones	Episode "The Open Road"
2016	The Legend of Gavin Tanner	Marshall	Episode "The Legend of Gavin and the New Best Mate"
2017	Top of the Lake	Carson	4 episodes
2018	Sando	Tony's Commercial (voice only)	Episode "Family Business"
2019	Mr. Black	Jim (Mr. Black's Doctor)	Episode "#1.7"
2018–2019	Squinters	Radio Announcer/Traffic Reporter	12 episodes
2023	Scrublands	Robbie Haus-Jones	4 episodes
2024	Darby and Joan	Laurie Sallaway	1 episode

=== Film ===
Year	Title	Role	Director	Other notes
2000	Narcosys	Orbit	Mark Bakaitis	
2002	Wilfred	Adam Douglas	Tony Rogers	Short film
2007	Rats and Cats	Ben Baxter	Tony Rogers	
2007	Little Deaths	Daniel/Toxicman	Toby Angwin, Chris Benz (director), Melanie Brunt	
2008	Valentine's Day	Beak	Peter Duncan	TV movie
2010	The Wedding Party	Tommy	Amanda Jane	
2016	Emo the Musical	Principal Stephens	Neil Triffett	
2021	Fraud Festival	Radio Announcer (voice only)	Sam Petersen	TV movie

== Awards and nominations ==
- AACTA: Won with Amanda Brotchie and Nicole Minchin Best Television Comedy for Lowdown (2012).
- AACTA: Won with Amanda Brotchie and Nicole Minchin Best Light Entertainment for Agony Aunts (2012).
- AWGIE (Australian Writers Guild) Award: Won with Amanda Brotchie and Trudy Hellier Best Comedy – Situation or Narrative for Lowdown (2012) Episode 3 – "One Fine Gay"
- Australian Film Institute Awards (Television): Won with Jason Gann Best Screenplay in Television Wilfred (2007)
- AWGIE (Australian Writers Guild) Award: Won with Amanda Brotchie Best Comedy – Situation or Narrative for Lowdown (2010) Episode 7 – "Who's Your Baddy?"
- AWGIE (Australian Writers Guild) Award: Nominated for Best Comedy – Situation or Narrative for Wilfred (2007) Episode 6 – "Dog Eat Dog" Wilfred (2007)
- Australian Film Institute Awards (Television): Won Best Actor in a Television Comedy Wilfred (2007)
- The Green Room Awards (Theatre): Nominated for Best Actor – Kissing for Australia
- Accolade Competition: Award for Excellence in Comedy – Lowdown
- Accolade Competition: Award for Excellence for Leading Actor – Lowdown

== Works ==
- Twelve Summers (2021)
