= Amanda Brotchie =

Australian television director (1964–2025)

- Born: 20 February 1964; Melbourne, Victoria, Australia
- Died: 19 December 2025 (aged 61)
- Occupations: Television director, writer, actor, linguist
- Known for: Riot Women; Doctor Who; Renegade Nell; Gentleman Jack; The Letdown; Picnic at Hanging Rock; Girlboss; Lowdown
- Spouse: Adam Zwar (m. 2003)

Amanda Brotchie (20 February 1964 – 19 December 2025) was an Australian television director. She was known for her direction of Riot Women (2025), Doctor Who (2024), Renegade Nell (2024), Gentleman Jack (2022), The Letdown (2019), Picnic at Hanging Rock (2018), Mr Black (2019), Girlboss (2017) and Lowdown (2010–2012). She was also a writer, producer, actor, and linguist.

== Early life and education ==
Amanda Brotchie was born on 20 February 1964.

Brotchie had a PhD in linguistics from the University of Melbourne. In researching her PhD, she lived in a remote village on an island in Vanuatu, filming and documenting the local language and culture.

== Career ==
Brotchie was a director, writer, producer, actor, and linguist.

She co-created the multi-award-winning series Lowdown (ABC, BBC Four), through the company High Wire Films, which she founded with producer Nicole Minchin and her husband, the writer, producer and actor Adam Zwar.

Other television shows Brotchie directed include Riot Women (2025), Doctor Who (BBC One, Disney+), Renegade Nell (Disney+), Gentleman Jack (BBC One, HBO), Picnic at Hanging Rock (Showcase, Amazon), Girlboss (Netflix), A Place to Call Home (Showcase, Acorn TV), The Letdown Series 2 (ABC, Netflix), Squinters (ABC), and Mr Black (Network 10), created by Adam Zwar, which she wrote on and set up.

Brotchie's theatre credits include The Inner Sanctum, which she directed, and Headlock, which she wrote and directed, and which was nominated for a Green Room Award for writing.

Brotchie directed the multi-award-winning short film Break & Enter (1999). Her awards included an AFI award for Best Short Film and the Film Critics Circle of Australia Award for Best Short Film. Break & Enter screened at numerous international festivals and, rare for a short film, had a cinema release in Australia through Palace Cinemas supporting the film Happy, Texas.

== Death ==
Brotchie died from cancer on 19 December 2025 aged 61.

== Filmography ==
- Riot Women (2025) (3 episodes)
- Doctor Who (2025) (2 episodes, "Lux" and "The Well")
- Renegade Nell (2024) (3 episodes)
- Gentleman Jack (2022) (2 episodes)
- The Letdown (2019) (2 episodes)
- Mr Black (2019) (4 episodes, set up director)
- A Place to Call Home (2018) (2 episodes)
- Picnic at Hanging Rock (2018) (1 episode)
- Squinters (2018–2019) (12 episodes)
- Girlboss (2018) (2 episodes)
- This Is Littleton (2014) (4 episodes)
- Zuzu & the Supernuffs (2013) (8 episodes)
- Lowdown (2010–2012) (16 episodes)

== Awards and nominations ==
- Screen Producers Australia Awards: This Is Littleton nominated for Best Comedy Series (2014)
- The AWGIE Awards: This is Littleton nominated for Best Television Comedy (2014)
- Australian Academy of Cinema and Television Arts AACTA Award for Best Television Comedy Series – Lowdown (2013)
- New York Television Festival: Bronze Award for Lowdown Series 2 (2013)
- New York Television Festival: Gold Award for Lowdown Series 1 (2011)
- AWGIE (Australian Writers Guild) Award: Best Comedy – Situation or Narrative for Lowdown. Episode 3 – "One Fine Gay". Won with Adam Zwar and Trudy Hellier (2012)
- Monte Carlo Television Festival: Best International TV Comedy (Lowdown nominated) (2013)
- Accolade Competition: Award for Excellence in Comedy – Lowdown
- Accolade Competition: Award of Merit in Direction – Amanda Brotchie
- AWGIE (Australian Writers Guild) Award: Best Comedy – Situation or Narrative for Lowdown. Episode 7 – "Who's Your Baddy?" Won with Adam Zwar (2010)
- Australian Film Institute Awards: Best Television Comedy Series – Lowdown (2010) (Nominated)
- Australian Directors Guild Awards: Best Direction in Television Comedy – Amanda Brotchie (2010) (Nominated)
- Australian Film Institute Awards: Best Short Fiction Film. Break & Enter
- Film Critics Circle of Australia: Best Short Fiction Film. Break & Enter
- The Green Room Awards (Theatre): Outstanding Achievement in Writing (2002) – Headlock (Nominated)
