= Jessica Gower =

Australian actress (born 1977)

- Born: 1977 (age 48–49); Melbourne, Victoria, Australia
- Education: Australian National Theatre Drama School (2000); Australian Film, Television and Radio School
- Occupation: Actress
- Known for: The Secret Life of Us; Crash Palace; Blade: The Series
- Spouse: Puven Pather
- Children: 1

Jessica Gower (born 1977, also credited as Jess Gower) is an Australian actress.

== Early life and education ==
Gower spent three years studying at the National Theatre Drama School, graduating in 2000. She later studied a Master of Arts Screen: Business at Australian Film, Television and Radio School (AFTRS), when she decided she wanted to know more about the business side of the industry.

== Career ==
Before she completed her studies, Gower began her acting career with guest stints on police procedural series Blue Heelers and long-running soap opera Neighbours. She also featured in Australian television commercials, first coming to attention as a starstruck but confused fan in a 2001 television commercial for Telstra featuring John Farnham and Glenn Wheatley, where her character mistook Wheatley for actor Paul Hogan. She then hosted the Fox8 television shows Simpsons by Request and World's Weirdest Pets.

Gower became best known to Australian and international audiences as the regular character of Sam, the ill-fated girlfriend of Will (Joel Edgerton) in the first season of the Network Ten drama The Secret Life of Us. Her performance earned her a nomination for Most Popular New Female Talent at the 2002 Logie Awards.

Gower went on to feature as New Zealand teenager, Miranda Watts in Foxtel soap opera Crash Palace, opposite Dieter Brummer, Jenni Baird, Tory Mussett and Kristy Wright. She also took on the role of teenager Jillian in 2002 Schoolies week drama film Blurred, alongside Matt Newton and Mark Priestley and had a recurring role in the Seven Network's medical drama series All Saints in 2003.

After having often played the 'girl nextdoor' archetype, Gower secured the role of Chase, a villainous vampire on U.S. series Blade: The Series, the television series spin-off of 1998 film Blade. She had originally auditioned for the part of Krista. The series debuted on Spike TV on 28 June 2006. The show was cancelled after one season.

In the 2010s, Gower returned to Australia, making guest appearances on Wilfred, Mr & Mrs Murder, Winners & Losers and Nowhere Boys. She also appeared in 2020 comedy film The Very Excellent Mr. Dundee, alongside Paul Hogan and 2022 family comedy film Blue's Big City Adventure, based on the children's television series Blue's Clues.

== Personal life ==
Jessica has been married to actor and stunt performer Puven Pather since 2004. They have a daughter named Sequoia.

After studying her Masters at Australian Film, Television and Radio School, together with Pather, Gower co-founded the business Sequioa, with the aim of reducing CO2 emissions in screen productions and entertainment, while fostering inclusivity and gender equality.

== Credits ==
=== Film ===
Year	Title	Role	Type	Ref
2002	Guru Wayne	Debbie	Feature film	
2002	Blurred	Jillian the Train Girl	Feature film	
2010	Scottish Bob	Lizzie	Short film	
2010	Sakuraniku	Girl Tourist	Short film	
2014	Isabelle Dances into the Spotlight	Auditions Dancer	TV movie	
2015	A Night of Horror: Volume 1	Beth	Anthology film, segment: "Scission"	
2017	No Appointment Necessary	Claire Davies	Feature film	
2020	The Very Excellent Mr. Dundee.	Eve	Feature film	
2022	Blue's Big City Adventure	Dancer	Feature film	

=== Television ===
Year	Title	Role	Type	Ref
	Simpsons by Request	Host		
	World's Weirdest Pets	Host		
1998 / 2000	Blue Heelers	Sophie Camilleri / Sasha McLeod	2 episodes	
1999	Neighbours	Jemma Acton	3 episodes	
2001	The Secret Life of Us	Sam	TV movie	
2001	Sparky D Comes to Town	Amy	TV movie	
2001	The Secret Life of Us	Sam	Season 1, 15 episodes	
2001–2002	Crash Palace	Miranda Watts		
2002	Ponderosa	Judith	1 episode	
2003	All Saints	Harriet Stapleton	Season 6, 4 episodes	
2006	Blade: The Series	Chase	12 episodes	
2010	Wilfred	Annika	Season 2, episode 5: "Ice Dog Cometh"	
2011	Underbelly Files: The Man Who Got Away	Cop #2	TV movie	
2013	Mr & Mrs Murder	Elena Scrletta	Miniseries, 1 episode	
2014	Winners & Losers	Ava Murdoch	Season 4, 1 episode	
2018	The Next Step	Dancer	1 episode	
2018	Nowhere Boys	Diane	Season 4, 1 episode	

=== Theatre ===
Year	Title	Role	Type	Ref
2003	X-Stacy		Wagga Wagga Civic Theatre, Laycock Street Theatre, Gosford, Illawarra Performing Arts Centre, Bunbury Regional Entertainment Centre with Black Swan Theatre Co	
2003	Les Liaisons Dangereuses		Playhouse, Melbourne with MTC	

== Awards ==
Year	Work	Award	Category	Result	Ref
2002	The Secret Life of Us	Logie Awards	Most Popular New Female Talent	Nominated	
