= Mr. Black (TV series) =

- Genre: Comedy
- Created by: Adam Zwar
- Written by: Adam Zwar; Amanda Brotchie
- Directed by: Amanda Brotchie; Clayton Jacobson
- Starring: Stephen Curry; Nadine Garner; Sophie Wright; Nick Russell; Paul Denny
- Country of origin: Australia
- Original language: English
- No. of seasons: 1
- No. of episodes: 8

Production
- Producer: Timothy Powell
- Running time: 25 minutes
- Production company: CJZ

Original release
- Network: Network Ten
- Release: 7 May – 18 June 2019

Mr. Black was an Australian television comedy series which premiered on Network Ten on 7 May 2019.

== Plot ==
Mr. Black follows the story of a former journalist whose failing health requires him to move in with his daughter Angela and her boyfriend Fin.

== Cast ==
- Stephen Curry as Mr. Peter Black
- Nadine Garner as Rowena Black
- Sophie Wright as Angela Geraldine Black
- Nick Russell as Fin Cruickshank
- Paul Denny as Malcolm
- Andrea Demetriades as Julia

== Episodes ==
No.	Title	Directed by	Written by	Original release date	Prod. code	Australian viewers
1	Episode 1	Amanda Brotchie	Adam Zwar	May 7, 2019	332363-1	471,000
2	Episode 2	Amanda Brotchie	Adam Zwar	May 14, 2019	332363-2	278,000
3	Episode 3	Clayton Jacobson	Adam Zwar	May 21, 2019	332363-3	341,000
4	Episode 4	Amanda Brotchie	Amanda Brotchie & Adam Zwar	May 28, 2019	332363-4	304,000
5	Episode 5	Clayton Jacobson	Amanda Brotchie & Adam Zwar	June 4, 2019	332363-5	309,000
6	Episode 6	Amanda Brotchie	Amanda Brotchie & Adam Zwar	June 11, 2019	332363-6	319,000
7	Episode 7	Clayton Jacobson	Amanda Brotchie & Adam Zwar	June 18, 2019	332363-7	318,000
8	Episode 8	Clayton Jacobson	Adam Zwar	June 18, 2019	332363-8	266,000

== Ratings ==
No.	Title	Air date	Overnight ratings		Consolidated ratings		Total viewers	Ref(s)
No.	Title	Air date	Viewers	Rank	Viewers	Rank	Total viewers	Ref(s)
1	Episode 1	7 May 2019	471,000	16	79,000	14	550,000	
2	Episode 2	14 May 2019	278,000	26	—N/a	—N/a	278,000	
3	Episode 3	21 May 2019	341,000	21	58,000	20	399,000	
4	Episode 4	28 May 2019	304,000	23	50,000	21	354,000	
5	Episode 5	4 June 2019	309,000	22	—N/a	—N/a	309,000	
6	Episode 6	11 June 2019	319,000	21	46,000	20	365,000	
7	Episode 7	18 June 2019	318,000	21	—N/a	—N/a	318,000	
8	Episode 8	18 June 2019	266,000	27	—N/a	—N/a	266,000	
