= Squinters =

Australian television comedy series

- Genre: Comedy drama
- Created by: Trent O'Donnell; Adam Zwar
- Country of origin: Australia
- Original language: English
- No. of seasons: 2
- No. of episodes: 12

Production
- Camera setup: Multi-camera
- Production company: Jungle Entertainment

Original release
- Network: ABC
- Release: 7 February 2018 – 14 August 2019

Squinters is an Australian television comedy series which first screened on the ABC on Wednesday 7 February 2018. All six episodes were also loaded on the ABC's iView catch up service on the same date. A second series went to air in 2019.

The first six-part series was produced by Jungle Entertainment and created by Trent O'Donnell and Adam Zwar. It is directed by O'Donnell along with Kate McCartney, Amanda Brotchie, Christiaan Van Vuuren and Cate Stewart. It was written by Zwar with Lally Katz, Sarah Scheller, Adele Vuko, Leon Ford and Ben Crisp.

== Plot ==
Squinters follows commuters in peak hour transit as they drive to work. The title Squinters, refers to the fact that the commuters are facing the sun as they head east from Sydney's western suburbs in the mornings, and then also face into the sun in the afternoons on the way back to the western suburbs.

== Cast ==
- Sam Simmons as Lukas
- Tim Minchin as Paul (Series 1)
- Andrea Demetriades as Romi
- Mandy McElhinney as Bridget
- Jenna Owen as Mia
- Justin Rosniak as Macca
- Steen Raskopoulos as Ned (Series 1)
- Susie Youssef as Simoni
- Rose Matafeo as Talia
- Wayne Blair as Gary
- Damon Herriman as Miles (Series 1)
- Jacki Weaver as Audrey (Series 1)
- Miranda Tapsell as Miranda (Series 1)
- Nyasha Hatendi as Davis (Series 1)
- Christiaan Van Vuuren as Gavin
- John Luc as Vijay (Series 1)
- Adam Zwar as Traffic Reporter
- Genevieve Morris as Alison (Series 2)
- Justine Clarke as Jess (Series 2)
- Anne Edmonds as Amy (Series 2)
- Stephen Peacocke as Frank (Series 2)
- Kristen Schaal as Tina (Series 2)
- Claudia O'Doherty as Rachel (Series 2)
- Paul Denny as Rex Sharp

== Episodes ==
| Series | Episodes | Originally released | |
| Series | Episodes | First released | Last released |
|---|---|---|---|
| 1 | 6 | 7 February 2018 | 14 March 2018 |
| 2 | 6 | 10 July 2019 | 14 August 2019 |

=== Season 1 (2018) ===
| No. overall | No. in season | Title | Original release date | Australia viewers (millions) |
|---|---|---|---|---|
| 1 | 1 | "Hit the Road" | 7 February 2018 | 471,000 |
| 2 | 2 | "Rocky Road" | 14 February 2018 | 333,000 |
| 3 | 3 | "King of the Road" | 21 February 2018 | 319,000 |
| 4 | 4 | "Road to Nowhere" | 28 February 2018 | 343,000 |
| 5 | 5 | "Crossroads" | 7 March 2018 | 387,000 |
| 6 | 6 | "End of the Road" | 14 March 2018 | 367,000 |

=== Season 2 (2019) ===
| No. overall | No. in season | Title | Directed by | Written by | Original release date | Australia viewers (millions) |
|---|---|---|---|---|---|---|
| 7 | 1 | "On The Road Again" | Unknown | Unknown | 10 July 2019 | N/A |
| 8 | 2 | "A Winding Road" | Unknown | Unknown | 17 July 2019 | N/A |
| 9 | 3 | "Roadhouse Blues" | Unknown | Unknown | 24 July 2019 | N/A |
| 10 | 4 | "Thunder Road" | Unknown | Unknown | 31 July 2019 | N/A |
| 11 | 5 | "Bless The Broken Road" | Unknown | Unknown | 7 August 2019 | N/A |
| 12 | 6 | "Take a Back Road" | Unknown | Unknown | 14 August 2019 | N/A |

== Adaptation ==
In September 2020, Jungle Entertainment announced they are in active development on creating an adaptation of the series for U.S. audiences.
