= Paul Denny (actor) =

Australian actor

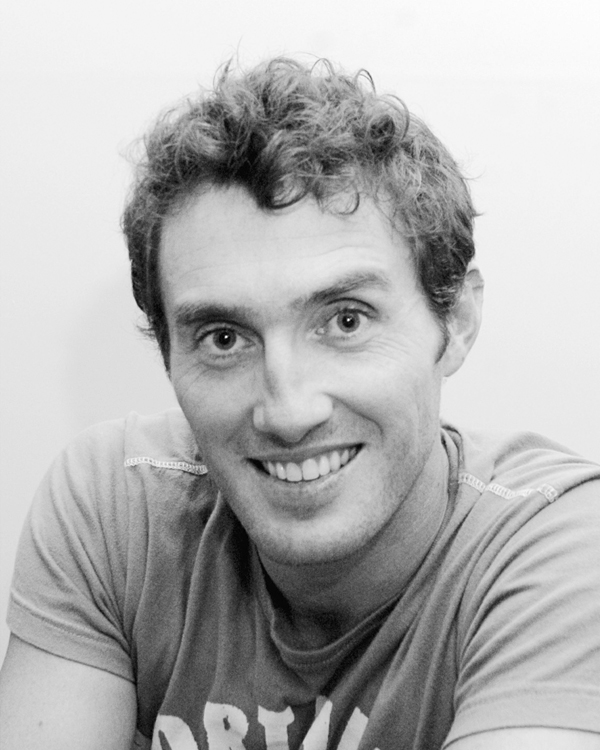
- Born: Allora, Queensland, Australia
- Occupation: Actor
- Years active: 1990s - present

Paul Denny is an Australian stage, television, and film actor.

== Early life ==
Paul Denny grew up in Allora, Queensland. His first experience of acting was at the age of 11 or 12, as one of the sons in a production of Fiddler On The Roof staged as part of the Allora annual community concert. He went on to perform in the annual concert in later years, including Monty Python skits.

After finishing school, he studied acting at university.

== Career ==
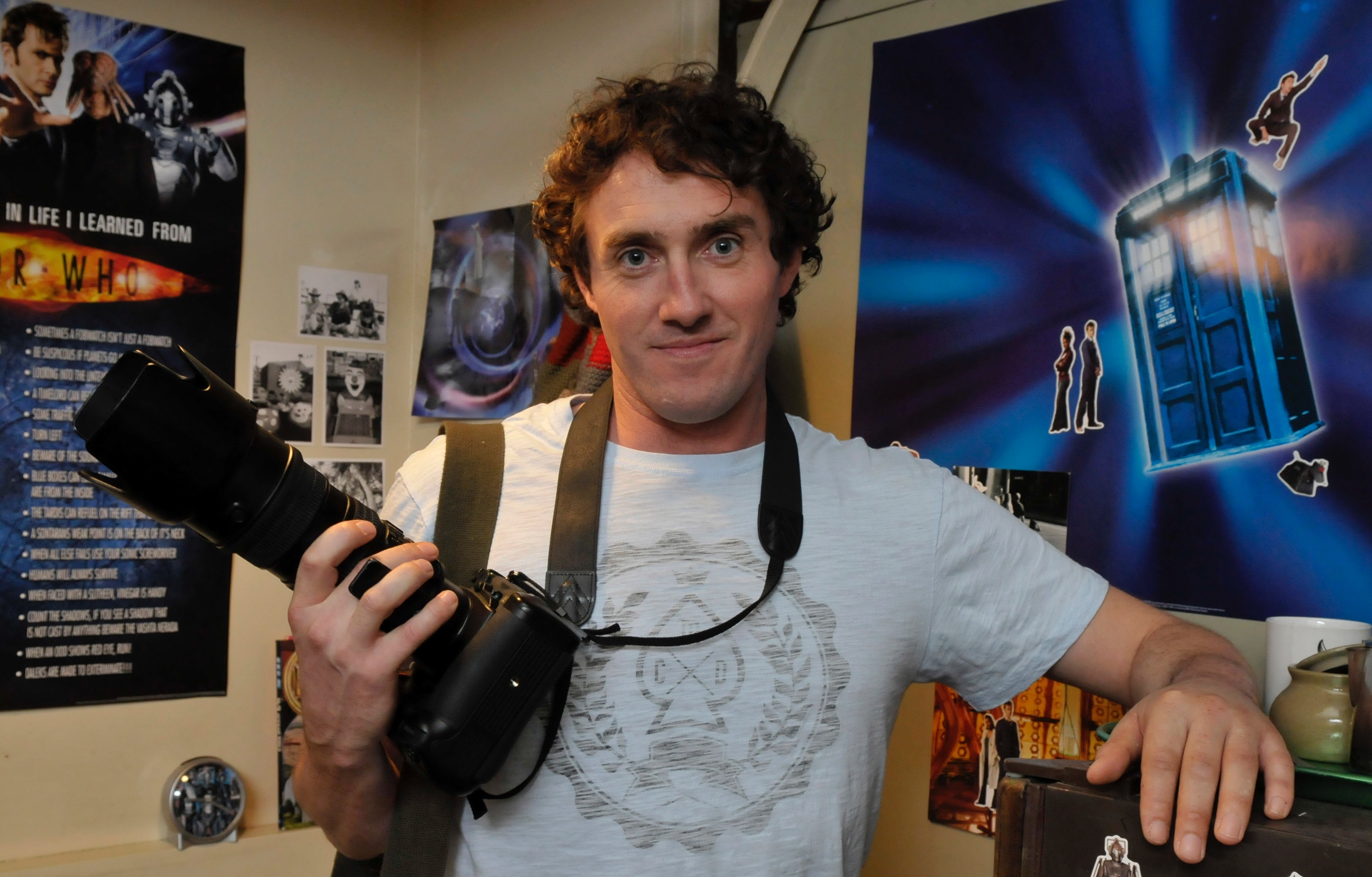
Denny as Bob Geraghty in Lowdown (2009)

After graduating, Denny moved to Brisbane to pursue his acting career. In the second year, he won his first professional acting job, playing several roles in a production of Hamlet that toured Queensland for around six months.

His good friend Adam Zwar wrote and directed a one-man show for Denny, called The Fall and Fall of Jeromy, which ran between 1993 and 1996 to critical acclaim. This proved a breakthrough, and Denny started getting regular parts at the two Brisbane professional theatre companies, as well as being offered various roles in film and TV.

In 2001, he played the lead in the international production of Johnno from the novel by David Malouf.

In 2003, he and his future wife Rebecca decided to move to Melbourne, which has a larger film and television industry.

In 2013, he appeared in the long-running TV soap Neighbours as Brian O'Loughlin.

By June 2014, he had appeared in more than 50 theatre productions.

== Awards and nominations ==
Year	Work	Award	Category	Result
1997	Scar	Matilda Award		Won
2003	A Day in the Death of Joe Egg	Matilda Awards		Won
2003	The Removalists	Matilda Awards		Won
2009	Lowdown	AFI Award	Best Performance in a Television Comedy	Nominated

== Acting credits ==
=== Film ===
Year	Title	Role	Director
1995	Tunnel Vision	Driver	Clive Fleury
1996	Joey	Davo	Ian Barry
2000	The Love of Lionel's Life	Darren	John Ruane
2001	Finding Hope	Savage	Geoffrey Nottage
2001	Hildegarde	Constable Peters	Di Drew
2004	Under the Radar	Eric	Evan Clarry
2007	Rats and Cats	Bruce	Tony Rogers
2008	Cue Howard	Lionel Brown	Pasan Chandraweera
2008	Numurkah	Robbo	Ryan Coonan
2009	In Her Skin	Paramedic	Simone North
2010	Hawke	Curly	Emma Freeman
2011	Purged	Sean	Michael Craft
2012	Last Dance	Duty Sergeant	David Pulbrook
2015	A Journey Through Time with Antony	Chef Tony	Janet Chun
2018	The BBQ	Ray	Stephen Amis
2019	Ride Like a Girl	Owner #4	Rachel Griffiths

=== Television ===
Year	Title	Role	Notes
1985	Lady Blue	Younger Man	Episode "Designer White"
1998	Adrenalin Junkies	Jake	Episode "Code Purple"
1998	The Day of the Roses	Constable Holman	2 episodes
2004	Blue Heelers	Peter Matarazzo	Episode "Too Late to Say Sorry"
2008	Satisfaction	Martin	3 episodes
2009	Dirt Game	Miner	Episode "Silent Night"
2010	Wilfred	Tony	Episode "Dog Star"
2010	Rush	Paul	Episode "Snatch"
2010-2011	Offspring	Sam Jenkins	7 episodes
2012	Australia on Trial	Henry Dangar	Episode "Massacre at Myall Creek"
2012	Howzat! Kerry Packer's War	Bruce Francis	Episode "#1.1"
2010-2012	Lowdown	Bob Geraghty	16 episodes
2013	Neighbours	Brian O'Loughlin	5 episodes
2014	Fat Tony & Co.	Hippy Paul	Episode "The Tony Special"
2014	How to Talk Australians	Dan Kelly	Episode "G'Day Knackers"
2016	The Doctor Blake Mysteries	Mick Lancaster	Episode "For Whom the Bell Tolls"
2016	Little Acorns	Paul	Episode "Pilot"
2016	Winners & Losers	Anthony Reeves	Episode "iBloom"
2016	Bruce	Private Perse	2 episodes
2017	Ronny Chieng: International Student	Gerard	Episode "Asian Rules Football"
2017	Utopia	Dennis	Episode "On the Defence"
2019	Mr. Black	Malcolm Woolridge/Malcolm Woolride	5 episodes
2019	My Life Is Murder	Dan	Episode "Lividity in Lycra"
2019	Squinters	Rex Sharp	Episode "Bless the Broken Road"

=== Stage ===
Year	Title	Role	Venue
1993–1995	Hamlet	Guildenstern, Fortinbras et al.	La Boite
1993–1995	The Fall and Fall of Jeromy	One person show	Metro Arts Theatre
1993-1995	Woyzeck	Woyzeck	Metro Arts Theatre
1993-1995	Hamlet	Horatio	Twelfth Night Theatre
1996	Bouncers	Judd	La Boite Theatre
1996	Abigail's Party	Tony	Backstreet Theatre
1996	The Fall and Fall of Jeromy	One-person show	Metro Arts Theatre
1996	A Midsummer Night's Dream	Lysander	QUT Woodward Theatre
1997	Scar	2-hander	La Boite
1997	Blackrock	Toby	La Boite
1997	When You Comin' Back, Red Ryder?	Teddy	QUT Woodward Theatre
1998	Third World Blues	Graham	City Theatre
1998	The John Wayne Principle	Robbie	La Boite
1998	Macbeth	Macbeth	Strut & Fret Theatre Company
1999	He Died with a Felafel in His Hand	John	La Boite
1999	First Asylum	Peter	La Boite
1999	Rio Saki and Other Falling Debris	Louis	La Boite
1999	Romeo and Juliet	Mercutio	La Boite
1999	Third World Blues	Graham	La Boite
2000	He Died with a Felafel in His Hand	John	La Boite
2000	Milo's Wake	Ned	La Boite
2000	Mrs. Warren's Profession	Frank Gardner	Queensland Theatre
2001	Seems Like Yesterday	Johnno	Kooemba Jdarra Indigenous Performing Arts
2001	Dirt	Carl, Phil	Queensland Theatre
2001	Fred	Barry	Queensland Theatre
2001	Richard II	Henry Bollingbrook	Queensland Theatre
2002	Richard III	Catesby	Bell Shakespeare national tour
2002	The Fortunes of Richard Mahony	Purdy	Queensland Theatre
2003	The Removalists	Kenny	La Boite
2003	Così	Nick / Justin	La Boite
2003	A Day in the Death of Joe Egg	Brian	Queensland Theatre
2004	The Cherry Orchard	Lopakhin	45 Downstairs
2004	The Conquest of the South Pole	Slupianek	The Store Room
2004	Terrorism	Various	Theatre@Risk
2006	Johnno	Johnno	La Boite / Brisbane Festival / Derby Playhouse UK
2006	Delicacy	Neil	Victorian Trades Hall
2007	Johnno	Johnno	La Boite / Brisbane Festival / Derby Playhouse UK
2008	Primrose Hill	One-person show	La Mama
2009	Realism	Klimenko	MTC
2012	Helicopter	He	MTC
2015	Jumpers for Goalposts	Joe	Red Stitch Actors Theatre
