= The Agony of... =

The Agony of... is a collection of conversational-style Australian television programs which originally screened between 2012 and 2015 on ABC1, and later aired in the United States on Vibrant TV Network. The format shows a number of well-known men and women talking to interviewer/narrator Adam Zwar.

== Agony Aunts ==
Agony Aunts was a six-part series that first screened in 2012 on Australia's ABC1. The show searched for answers on dating, cohabitation, marriage, and divorce. It featured personalities such as Judith Lucy (comedian, actress), Denise Scott (comedian, actress), Myf Warhurst (TV host), Angela Catterns (broadcaster), Wendy Harmer (broadcaster), Hannah Gadsby (comedian), Leah Vandenberg, Kate Jenkinson (actress), Sam Lane, Mirka Mora, Sarah Wilson (journalist), Julia Zemiro (TV host), Susan Carland, Maya Stange (actress), Bridget Taylor, Amanda Brotchie (writer, director), Heather Mitchell (actress) and Charlotte Gregg (actress).

Agony Aunts was the winner of Best Light Entertainment Television Series at the 2012 AACTA Awards, Best Local Documentary Series at the 2012 Couch Potato Awards.

== Agony Uncles ==
Agony Uncles was a six-part series that first screened in 2012 on Australia's ABC1. The show searched for answers on dating, cohabitation, marriage, and divorce. It featured personalities such as Brett Tucker (actor), Damian Walshe-Howling (actor), Waleed Aly (broadcaster, academic), Ed Kavalee (actor, TV host), Adam Elliot (Academy Award-winning animator), Josh Lawson (actor, screenwriter), Lawrence Leung (broadcaster, comedian), Lawrence Mooney (comedian), Dave Thornton (comedian, broadcaster), John Elliott (businessman), Tom Elliott (businessman, broadcaster), Kick Gurry (actor), Andrew Knight (screenwriter, producer), Glynn Nicholas (playwright, producer), Sam Pang (TV host, broadcaster), Tim Ross (author, broadcaster), Scott Brennan (actor), Des Dowling (comedian).

Agony Uncles was nominated for Best Comedy in Sketch or Light Entertainment at the 2012 AWGIE Awards.

== The Agony of Life ==
The Agony of Life which first screened in 2013 covers stages of life, from child to adult, creating and supporting families, building and managing careers and contemplates the wording of their epitaph.

The series featured such personalities as Waleed Aly, Stephen Curry, John Elliott, Tom Elliott, Hannah Gadsby, Steve Vizard, Dawn Fraser, Shane Jacobson, Sam Lane, Kate Langbroek, Judith Lucy, Craig McLachlan, Lawrence Mooney, Mirka Mora, Dave O'Neil, Sam Pang, Tim Ross, Yumi Stynes, Dave Thornton, Myf Warhurst, Leah Vandenberg and Julia Zemiro.

== The Agony of Christmas ==
The Agony of Christmas was a Christmas special that was first screened in December 2013. It featured the same cast seen in The Agony of Life.

== The Agony of Modern Manners ==
The Agony of Modern Manners was a six-part series which screened in 2014, with episodes titled Work, Home, Online, Dining, Travel, Weddings & Funerals.

== Agony of the Mind ==
Agony of the Mind is a special that was first screened in October 2014 focusing on mental weaknesses and techniques for overcoming them. It features Jack Charles, John Elliott, Tom Elliott, Dawn Fraser, Jess Harris, Dave Hughes, Kerri-Anne Kennerley, Andrew Knight, Pat McGorry, Lawrence Mooney, Dave O'Neil, Fiona O'Loughlin, Sam Pang, Tim Ross, Chrissie Swan, Yumi Stynes, Julia Zemiro.

== The Agony of... ==
A six-part series began screening in April 2015 with episodes titled: The Agony of the Body, The Agony of God, The Agony of Secrets, The Agony of Flirting, The Agony of School and The Agony of Ageing. The series features Lawrence Mooney, Grace Jennings-Edquist, Gael Jennings, Celia Pacquola, John Elliott, Tom Elliott, Steve Vizard, Kate Langbroek, Joe Hildebrand and Amanda Vanstone.

== See also ==
- Grumpy Old Men
- Grumpy Old Women
