= Gael Jennings =

Australian journalist (born 1951)

Gael Jennings AM
- Born: Marjorie Gael Jennings; 7 June 1951 (age 75); Melbourne, Victoria, Australia
- Known for: Immunologist; TV Presenter and commentator; radio presenter; lecturer; author
- Scientific career
- Fields: Immunology; Journalism; Media
- Workplaces: Walter and Eliza Hall Institute; University of Melbourne; ABC TV; ABC Radio
- Thesis: (1982)

Marjorie Gael Jennings AM (born 7 June 1951) is currently an Honorary Fellow at the Centre for Advancing Journalism at the University of Melbourne. She is also a presenter and commentator for ABC TV, co-host of the ABC Radio 774 Conversation Hour program, and executive director of MediaDoc.

== Education ==
After graduating with a First Class Honours BSc from the University of Melbourne, Jennings completed her PhD in Immunology at the Walter and Eliza Hall Institute of Medical Research in 1982.

== Career ==
Upon completion of her PhD, Jennings chose a path in media and became the Australian Broadcasting Corporation's first National Science and Medical Reporter for TV News (1986–1989), for the TV Current Affairs program The 7.30 Report (1992–1996), and for the weekly TV Science show, Quantum (1989–1992). She was presenter of ABC Radio 774 mid-morning and afternoon shows (1996–1990), until joining SBS TV where she presented the live weekly TV Current Affairs programme Insight.

In 2004, Jennings became a regular member of The Brains Trust on ABC TV's Einstein Factor quiz show for 5 years. In 2006, Jennings worked at the ABC TV network as a development producer for documentaries in the genres of Science, Religion, Ethics, Natural History and Indigenous Production. She appeared in ABC TV and Adam Zwar's HighWire Film's sixth Agony series in 2015, alongside her daughter, writer and ABC reporter Grace Jennings-Edquist.

Jennings runs MediaDoc, a science communication and media management and training business. Jennings was the Chief Executive Officer at a non-profit organisation called Greatconnections Ltd. for two years (2008–10), now part of Leadership Victoria and in 2017 was an Honorary Fellow at the Centre for Advancing Journalism at the University of Melbourne, where she researches the role of media in violence against women and the impact of the internet on the brain.

She maintains her roles as ABC TV commentator, co-host for ABC Radio 774 from 1986–present, and travels as an invited speaker to various events.

== Projects ==
Jennings is the author of two books: the first, titled Sick As!... Bloody Moments in the History of Medicine was published in 2000, won the NSW Premiers History Award in the Young People's History category, and was shortlisted for the 2001 Children's Book Council Australia Award. The second, Beyond Belief: How Five Australian Scientists Changed the World, was published in 2002.

Jennings has served on numerous Arts, Science, Education and Literary Boards, including the Melbourne Writers Festival Board, Museum Vic, Cancer Council Australia, Questacon (National Science and Technology Centre), Old Treasury Building, The Maths and Science Advisory Council (Vic) and is currently on the City of Melbourne Prevention of Violence Against Women Committee

== Awards ==
Jennings is the recipient of multiple awards, including:

- Member of the Order of Australia in the 2020 Australia Day Honours for "significant service to science, and to the broadcast media."
- Who's Who in Australian Women (2008– 2014)
- Walkley Award, National Finalist (1994)
- UN Media Award finalist (2014)
- Austcare Media Award (2001)
- Children's Book Council Award Finalist (2001)
- NSW Premiers History Prize (2000)
- MBF Health and Wellbeing Awards (1993, 1995, 1996, 1997)
- Kellogg's Award for Excellence in Nutrition Journalism (1995)
- Michael Daley Science Journalism Award, Best TV news/ current affairs (1992, 1995; Best Overall Entry 1992, 1995)
- Amgen Excellence in Biotechnology Award (1995)
- Peter Grieve Medical Journalism Award (1993)
- English Speaking Union Scholarship
- American Field Service Scholarship
