= Desmond Zwar =

Australian journalist (1931–2022)

- Born: 20 October 1931; Beechworth, Victoria
- Died: 27 April 2022 (aged 90)
- Occupation: Writer for children
- Writing career
- Language: English
- Years active: 1969–2010
- Notable work: Talking to Rudolph Hess

Desmond Zwar (1931–2022) was born in Beechworth, Victoria, and was an author and veteran reporter from Melbourne, Australia. He studied at Scotch College, Melbourne, graduating in 1949.

He worked for the Border Mail in Albury, New South Wales, and The Herald (now the Herald Sun) in Melbourne. He was a reporter, foreign correspondent, feature writer and acting features editor of the Daily Mail in London for 11 years. Having previously lived near Cairns in Queensland, he resided in Beechworth until his death in 2022.

Zwar was most famous for conducting an interview over several years with imprisoned Nazi leader Rudolf Hess.

That gained international attention because Zwar persuaded Hess to admit that he had been part of the planning team for the invasion of the Soviet Union. The imminent invasion was what had convinced Hess to try, at the last moment, to seek an alliance with Britain against Bolshevism by flying to Scotland in 1941.

Zwar's son, Adam Zwar, is an actor in Australia.

== Death ==
Desmond Zwar died on 27 April 2022, aged 90.

== Books by Desmond Zwar ==
- The Infamous of Nuremberg, Written For Col.Burton C Andrus, Published in 1969 By Coward-McCann, US, Leslie Frewin, UK; And in Several European Countries.
- This Wonderful World of Golf, With Peter Thomson, Published in 1969 By Pelham Books, UK. ISBN 978-0-7207-0042-8.
- The Loneliest Man in the World: the inside story of the 30-year imprisonment of Rudolf Hess. Written For Col. Eugene Bird. Secker & Warburg, London, 1974. Published by Viking US and in 10 Other Countries. ISBN 978-0-436-04290-4. OCLC 1094312
- Vet in the Clouds, With Vet Don Lavers, Published By Granada UK. 1978. ISBN 978-0-246-11053-4.
- In Search of Keith Murdoch, Published By Macmillan, Aust. And UK. 1980. ISBN 978-0-333-29973-9.
- The Soul of a School, Published By Macmillan, Aust. 1982. ISBN 978-0-333-33840-7.
- New Frontiers of Medical Research, Published By Stein & Day, US, And in Japan. ISBN 978-0-8128-2807-8.
- The Magic Mussel, Arthritis Another Way, Published By Ideas Unlimited, Aust., 1983. ISBN 978-0-946714-01-8.
- The Dame: the Life and Times of Dame Jean Macnamara, Medical Pioneer, Published By Macmillan, Aust., 1984. ISBN 978-0-333-38045-1.
- The Ma Evans Baldness Cure, Woodland Books, US, 1984.
- Golf: The Dictionary, Published By Sun Books, Aust., David & Charles, UK, Tomas Books, Germany, 1984. ISBN 978-0-7153-8677-4.
- Doctor Ahead of His Time – The Life of Dr. Ainslie Meares, Psychiatrist, Published By Greenhouse Publications, 1985. ISBN 978-0-909104-98-6.
- The Mad, Mad World of Unisex Golf, Published By Ideas Unlimited, Aust. 1990. ISBN 978-0-9591771-1-4.
- Disgrace! The Saga of The Downfall of Medical Hero, Dr.William Mcbride.
- The Queen, Rupert & Me, Sid Harta Publishing, Hartwell, Victoria, Australia, 2004/5/6. ISBN 978-1-877059-66-7.
- Talking To Rudolf Hess, The History Press UK, 2010. ISBN 978-0-7524-5522-8.
