= Lowdown (TV series) =

Australian television comedy series

- Created by: Amanda Brotchie; Adam Zwar
- Written by: Amanda Brotchie; Adam Zwar; Trudy Hellier
- Directed by: Amanda Brotchie
- Starring: Adam Zwar; Paul Denny; Beth Buchanan; Dailan Evans; Kim Gyngell
- Narrated by: Geoffrey Rush
- Theme music composer: Nick Cave
- Opening theme: "There She Goes, My Beautiful World" by Nick Cave and the Bad Seeds
- Country of origin: Australia
- Original language: English
- No. of seasons: 2
- No. of episodes: 16

Production
- Producer: Nicole Minchin
- Running time: 30 minutes

Original release
- Network: ABC1
- Release: 21 April 2010 – 25 October 2012

Lowdown is an Australian television comedy series set in the world of celebrity journalism. Created by Amanda Brotchie and Adam Zwar, it stars Zwar, Paul Denny, Beth Buchanan, Dailan Evans, Kim Gyngell and is narrated by Geoffrey Rush. The ABC series premiered on 21 April 2010 and is produced by Nicole Minchin and directed by Amanda Brotchie.

== Cast ==
=== Main ===
- Adam Zwar as Alex Burchill
- Paul Denny as Bob Geraghty
- Beth Buchanan as Rita Heywood
- Dailan Evans as Dr James Sawers
- Kim Gyngell as Howard Evans
- Geoffrey Rush as Narrator
- Anna Jennings-Edquist as Sharna
- Ashley Zukerman as Dylan Hunt
- Julia Zemiro as Hope van der Boom
- Rebecca Massey as Trudy
- Cindy Waddingham as Andrea
- Antony Starr as Stuart King
- Amanda Brotchie as Susan
- Sullivan Stapleton as Oliver Barry

=== Guests ===
- Charlotte Gregg as Selina
- Daniela Farinacci as Kara, 1st AD
- Eliza Szonert as Clare
- Emily Wheaton as Waitress
- Gareth Yuen as Golf Administrator
- Greg Stone as Steve Mott
- Jane Harber as Lucy / Joss
- Kate Jenkinson as Samantha
- Kimberley Davies as Imogen McMahon
- Laura Gordon as Claire Day
- Martin Copping as Flicker
- Nicholas Bell as Jeremy Bristol
- Steve Bisley as Jack Copper
- Tony Nikolakopoulos as George

== Series overview ==
The first series consisted of eight episodes and premiered on 21 April 2010 and ended its first-run on 9 June 2010. A spokesperson for the series, stated in a reply on the 'Letters to the Editor' section on the online website "I know the creators personally and they promise me they’re onto developing a second season." A second series of eight episodes was broadcast from 6 September 2012 to 25 October 2012.

Season	Episodes	Originally aired	
Season	Episodes	Season premiere	Season final
1	8	21 April 2010	9 June 2010
2	8	6 September 2012	25 October 2012

== Episodes ==
=== Series 1 (2010) ===
No. overall	No. in season	Title	Directed by	Written by	Original release date
1	1	"Wasp in Translation"	Amanda Brotchie	Amanda Brotchie; Adam Zwar	21 April 2010
Alex Burchill, columnist of the Lowdown section, is able to have an interview with Tantra-loving Wasp Warneke without asking about Tantra, which causes problems, since the only reason for the interview is to speak about Tantra. Trying to impress his girlfriend Rita, Alex offers her the photographer job for the Wasp story, however when his actual photographer Bob discovers he has been cut from the Wasp project, he is disheartened.
2	2	"Bonk Bonk, Who's There?"	Amanda Brotchie	Amanda Brotchie; Trudy Hellier; Adam Zwar	28 April 2010
Hope van der Boom briefs Alex before he interviews Oliver Barry, a famous actor. However Alex and Bob find the interview awkward and uncomfortable and shortly after find themselves helping Oliver Barry seek refuge from a group of the paparazzi. Later, hoping to rekindle her relationship with Alex, Rita, climbs through his window and into his bed, only to find Oliver Barry whom Alex gave his bed to, so he could avoid the paparazzi.
3	3	"Zirco Goes Berko"	Amanda Brotchie	Amanda Brotchie; Adam Zwar	5 May 2010
Professional tennis player Mitch "Zirco" Zicopoulos pulls out from a warm-up tournament match because of a sore finger, leaving 20,000 fans feeling ripped off. Alex's editor is determined to expose Zirco's fake injury and sends Alex and Bob to find evidence. Meanwhile, Alex is trying to deal with the numerous diagnoses Dr James gives regarding a pimple on his private parts.
4	4	"Hart of Darkness"	Amanda Brotchie	Amanda Brotchie; Adam Zwar	12 May 2010
On the eve of her Melbourne concert, plagiarising singer Sofia Corelli is assaulted, causing Alex to suspect the well-known torch singer Abi Hart is involved in the crime. Alex, with Bob's assistance, learns the drug addict Abi is being held at a secure rehab centre. Without Dr James' consent to write a referral letter for Alex, because the rehab centre is only for celebrities or very important people, he plans to infiltrate the centre.
5	5	"Cooper Scooper"	Amanda Brotchie	Amanda Brotchie; Adam Zwar	19 May 2010
The editor orders Alex, Bob and Rita to travel to businessman Jack Cooper's Toorak mansion for a one-on-one interview with him after he was charged with drink driving. They find Jack isn't there, but they are invited into his home by Mrs Cooper, a former actress who appeared in Dr Who. Being a fan, Bob requests to see the memorabilia and Mrs Cooper happily accepts. However, Jack returns and becomes angry, releasing attack dogs on Alex, Bob and Rita.
6	6	"Lavish Swinger"	Amanda Brotchie	Amanda Brotchie; Adam Zwar; Trudy Hellier	26 May 2010
Ranked number one golfer in Australia, Mike Lavish arrives in Melbourne to promote his golf DVD game. Alex confronts Lavish during a press conference with video evidence of him taking an 'air-swing' while competing at the Australian Masters, however he is quickly banished from the conference by publicist, Hope Van der Boom. Later in the male toilets, Alex meets Mike once again to apologise and while showing Mike is golf swing, accidentally clubs Lavish, putting him in a coma. With CCTV evidence of the assault, Alex is arrested by the police, with only Lavish knowing what really happened.
7	7	"Who's Your Baddy?"	Amanda Brotchie	Amanda Brotchie; Adam Zwar	2 June 2010
Alex is forced to snoop out information on Tony Marino, an underworld crime boss, and brings along Bob to take pictures. The two are taken to interview Tony at a hotel, but while interviewing Marino, Alex eats peanuts and has an anaphylactic attack. Tony's henchmen then leave him at Dr James' surgery with Bob still remaining with the Marino gang.
8	8	"Project Runaway"	Amanda Brotchie	Amanda Brotchie; Adam Zwar	9 June 2010
Joss Miller, finalist of the hit reality television series 'Project Starsearch,' has left the contestant compound just days before the expensive final airs. The editor starts a contest for the first journalist to locate Miller and interview her, the winner receiving $10,000. Alex doesn't attempt the contest as he is soon to leave on his vacation to a luxury resort. At the resort, Bob meets Sam and they hit it off and, while Alex is taking a mud-bath, he rescues a drowning Lucy. Alex has aspirations of Lucy becoming his future wife. However, things go pear-shaped after Alex and Bob discover Lucy is actually runaway Joss Miller. Alex has to make a decision whether to save the Sunday Sun from going bankrupt or keeping the love of his life happy.

=== Series 2 (2012) ===
No. overall	No. in season	Title	Directed by	Written by	Original release date
9	1	"Pretty Pollie"	Amanda Brotchie	Amanda Brotchie; Adam Zwar	6 September 2012
The Sunday Sun's circulation is in free-fall and the only thing that will save it is a story about a woman marrying her cat. On the home front, Alex is left in limbo when Bob rekindles his relationship with Samantha and they kick him out of the apartment. With his relationship with Rita all but over and Rita's spare room occupied by her mother, Alex finds himself at the mercy of his old mate Dr. James.
10	2	"Hack in Business"	Amanda Brotchie	Amanda Brotchie; Adam Zwar; Trudy Hellier	13 September 2012
After missing out on the biggest story of the year, Alex has a chance to redeem himself by entrapping a fornicating film director. But a road rage incident throws a spanner in the works
11	3	"One Fine Gay"	Amanda Brotchie	Amanda Brotchie; Adam Zwar; Trudy Hellier	20 September 2012
Alex is commandeered into ghost-writing a controversial column for a high profile footballer who has decided to come out
12	4	"Rex, Lies And Videotape"	Amanda Brotchie	Amanda Brotchie; Adam Zwar	27 September 2012
When Alex is assigned to interview highly volatile actor Lachlan Reid, he goes out of his way to antagonise Reid in the hope of getting a rise worth reporting
13	5	"A Bollywood Ending"	Amanda Brotchie	Amanda Brotchie; Adam Zwar	4 October 2012
Alex is charged with locating the spurned lover of Australian test cricket captain Mark Hardy, and convincing her to grant an exclusive interview to the Sunday Sun
14	6	"Bubble Trouble"	Amanda Brotchie	Amanda Brotchie; Adam Zwar	11 October 2012
When one of the journalists invited to spend the night in the share-house of reality show 'Life in a Bubble' is found stabbed to death, Alex becomes the prime suspect.
15	7	"The Naked Chef"	Amanda Brotchie	Amanda Brotchie; Adam Zwar	18 October 2012
When a celebrity chef insults Alex's new girlfriend on national television, Alex and Bob set up an elaborate News of the World-type sting to expose the chef cheating on his wife with a wannabe actress.
16	8	"Ben Behaving Badly"	Amanda Brotchie	Amanda Brotchie; Adam Zwar	25 October 2012
When Bob inadvertently snaps a compromising photo of singer/actor Ben Hollander, Alex and Bob decide to capitalise on it as revenge for Hollander running up a massive tab on Alex's credit card.

== Australian ratings ==
Episode	Date Aired	Timeslot	Rating	Nightly Rank	Weekly Rank
1.01	21 April 2010	9.00 Wednesday	545,000	27	98
1.02	28 April 2010	9.00 Wednesday	469,000	26	100+
1.03	5 May 2010	9.00 Wednesday	601,000	24	91
1.04	12 May 2010	9.00 Wednesday	594,000	25	97
1.05	19 May 2010	9.00 Wednesday	560,000	27	100
1.06	26 May 2010	9.00 Wednesday	422,000	30	100+
1.07	2 June 2010	9.00 Wednesday	580,000	24	95
1.08	9 June 2010	9.00 Wednesday	523,000	25	100+
Series Average	---	---	536,000	26	97

== Awards ==
=== Awards won ===
'Australian Academy of Cinema and Television Arts

- AACTA Award for Best Television Comedy Series – Lowdown Season 2 Amanda Brotchie, Nicole Minchin and Adam Zwar (2013)

New York Festivals Awards

- Gold World Medal for Best Comedy – Lowdown Season 2 (2013)
- Gold World Medal for Best Situation Comedy – Lowdown (2011)

Australian Writers' Guild Awards

- AWGIE Award for Best Comedy (Situation or Narrative) – Lowdown Season 2. Episode 3, "One Fine Gay" – Amanda Brotchie, Trudy Hellier and Adam Zwar (2012)
- AWGIE Award for Best Comedy (Situation or Narrative) – Lowdown Episode 7, "Who's Your Baddy?" – Amanda Brotchie and Adam Zwar (2010)

Screen Producers Association of Australia

- Breakthrough Producer of the Year Award – Lowdown Nicole Minchin (2010) Accolade Competition

Accolade Awards

- Award for Excellence in Comedy – Lowdown (2011)
- International Award for Excellence for Leading Actor – Adam Zwar (2011)
- International Award of Merit in Direction – Amanda Brotchie (2011)

=== Award nominations ===
Monte-Carlo Television Festival

- Golden Nymph Award for Best International Comedy Series – Lowdown (2013)
- Golden Nymph Award for Outstanding Actor in a Comedy Series – Adam Zwar (2013)
- Golden Nymph Award for Outstanding Actress in a Comedy Series – Beth Buchanan (2013)

Australian Academy of Cinema and Television Arts

- AACTA Award for Best Screenplay in Television – Lowdown Season 2. Episode 3, "One Fine Gay" – Amanda Brotchie, Adam Zwar, Trudy Hellier (2013)

Australian Film Institute Awards

- AFI Award for Best Television Comedy Series – Lowdown (2010)
- AFI Award for Best Performance in a Television Comedy – Paul Denny (2010)

Australian Directors Guild Awards

- Best Direction in Television Comedy – Amanda Brotchie (2010)

== See also ==
- List of Australian television series
- List of programs broadcast by ABC (Australian TV network)
