= How to Talk Australians =

Online miniseries

- Genre: Comedy
- Written by: Rob Hibbert; Tony Rogers
- Directed by: Tony Rogers
- Country of origin: Australia
- Original language: English
- No. of seasons: 1
- No. of episodes: 8

Production
- Producer: Jason Byrne
- Running time: ≥ 4 minutes

How to Talk Australians is an eight-part online miniseries released in 2014. The series looks at Australian culture and language through the eyes of the teachers and students of the fictional Delhi College of Linguistics.

== Synopsis ==
At the Delhi College of Linguistics in India, students of linguistics and aspiring migrants to Australia are taught about elements of Australian culture such as Australian lingo, rhyming slang, grub, local celebrities, how to 'chuck a sickie', and how to pass the citizenship test. The show features a foul-mouthed cockatoo known as Chopper, an impersonation of Pauline Hanson, and a re-enactment of a Ned Kelly hold-up.

== Production ==
The series was originally created as a television pilot that was to be pitched to Australian television networks; however, Screen Australia's Multiplatform Drama Production program, aiming to support and increase online storytelling, provided funds for it to be presented as an online series.

When asked why the concept for the show was chosen, producer Jason Byrne stated:

We chose it because it resonated with us as a commentary on Australian culture. A look at cultural clash and interpretation. How nations see one another in a heightened realism. Realism is often funnier than fiction and fantasy. It allows Australians to look at themselves through a different set of glasses, and those glasses are a call-back centre in India.

— Jason Byrne, Sydney Morning Herald.

== Episodes ==
No.	Title
1	"G'day Knackers"
2	"Grub"
3	"Rhyming Slang"
4	"Famous Australians"
5	"Nicknames - Hello Chopper"
6	"The Slackarse Country"
7	"Dunny Budgies & Budgie Smugglers"
8	"Citizenship Test"

== Cast ==
- Vishal Kotak
- Jeffrey Dsouza
- Chum Ehelepola
- Vikrant Narain
- Sybil Quadros
- Ananth Gopal
- Kamla Chandar
- Robert Santiago as Professor Dillop
- Paul Denny as Dan Kelly
- Eddie Baroo as Karen's Hubby

== Film adaptation ==
A feature film based on the series, titled How to Talk Australians: The Movie, began production on 8 May 2023, and it was released in 2026. Rob Hibbert and Tony Rogers were announced to be returning as writers, with Rogers as director. The film will feature the original cast alongside new characters played by Australian actors Shane Jacobson, Dave Lawson, Stephen Curry, and Richard Davies, among others. It will be distributed by Umbrella Entertainment in Australia and New Zealand.

The film follows a group of students and teachers from the fictional Delhi College of Linguistics on a trip to Australia as their plane is diverted to the country town of Dubbo.

== See also ==
- They're a Weird Mob
