= List of The Wedge characters and sketches =

This is a list of the characters and sketches on the Australian sketch show, The Wedge.

== Season one ==
=== Lucy Webster skits ===
Seasons 1 and 2

- Lucy Webster (Rebel Wilson) - Lucy is an overweight, outcast schoolgirl who stalks a boy she likes (named 'Dylan'), and often talks about how she thinks he likes her, but it is implied he is disgusted by her. She also stares in to the screen at him watching her. (Although a possible plot inconsistency is the fact that she appears on the computer screen, which would in all probability be his, as she would not need to bring her own image up on the screen; and therefore his attempts to shake her off would seem to be in conflict with the fact he still actively engages in internet communication with her.) She briefly stopped stalking Dylan in order to stalk her school counsellor, Andrew, but has since returned to Dylan. She also does horrible things to Dylan's girlfriends saying-"Well, now that they're out of the way, we get back to our schedule"(A timetable Lucy had made for their dates and when they should make passionate love). On the second series she starts a website with the web address, LandofLucy.com.au where she gives advice to people on how to live life to its best.
- Dylan Mortlock - Dylan is the boy that is trying to avoid Lucy at all costs from stalking him. During the middle of the first season, Dylan informed the school counsellor about Lucy's stalking habits and got rid of her since she started stalking Andrew, but Lucy returned to him later in the season.
- Damien - Damien is Dylan's friend, who presumably is gay, he was told off by Lucy in the early stages of the first season and was sent to military school by his father. Damien was mentioned later in the season, going to the school dance.
- Miss Rogers - Miss Rogers was very briefly, Lucy's counsellor at school but she was in a car accident because her brakes failed and she is in a coma. Lucy thought that Miss Rodgers was stalking Dylan so that's why she cut her brakes.
- Andrew Hollis - Andrew is Lucy's school counsellor, whom she stalked throughout the middle of the first season. Andrew is later confirmed mental when, Lucy stalks him too much.
- Judith Hollis - Little information is known about Andrew's mother except that she was sent to prison.
- Gailan - Gailan was only shown in person for one episode in which he was supposedly Lucy's boyfriend from South Africa. Gailan teaches Lucy voodoo works so that she could rid of Melissa, who at that time was Dylan's girlfriend.
- Mellisa, Courtney and Maddison - Victims of Lucy's stalking antics.

=== Jack and Jill Farmer skits ===
Season 1 and 2

- Jack Farmer (Dailan Evans) - Jack is a farmer who owns a farm which is suffering from drought. He also has a son, who sometimes appears in the background. Jack and Jill's animals have died, they have lost $50 000 in crops, they have no phones, and possibly no electricity. Jack is constantly followed by flies, even on occasions when he leaves the farm and heads into the city. He frequently throws away chances of becoming rich by ignoring the "heavy metal" in his creek (actually gold) and throwing away wine that is "like 100 years old.". Despite his misfortune, Jack's mantra is "Could be worse" and is normally interrupted by the "f***ing flies".
- Jill Farmer (Marney McQueen) - Jill is Jack's wife and most worthy companion. She sometimes has to leave the farm and is sometimes a little inconsiderate of Jack, for example, using him as a horse and carriage.
- Ennis (Anthony Ahern) - Whenever Jill has to leave the farm, she is replaced by a (presumably homosexual) cowboy called Ennis (Anthony Ahern), a parody of Heath Ledger's character from Brokeback Mountain, leading to many homosexual double entendres, such as "Ennis is a big fan of my back paddock" and "Are we just going to leave our rods out?" (referring to fishing rods).

Note: Marney McQueen will not be returning. Therefore, the character, Jill Farmer isn't in the second season.

=== Mark Wary skits ===
Seasons 1 and 2

- Mark Wary (Jason Gann) - Mark a professional athlete who frequently gets into brawls, public sexual acts and other incidents both on and off the field. His sketches always depict him and his manager (Dailan Evans) holding a press conference in which Mark apologising to the public for his latest scandal. Wary has difficulty reading the apologies that his manager has written for him, resulting in him saying a similar-sounding but inappropriate word, such as "Indecent" instead of "Incident", and his manager is constantly having to correct him. In the second series, Mark retires after due consideration but is employed again with more mishaps after persuasion by his manager, Jerry. Mark Wary is a parody of Shane Warne and Wayne Carey, although neither are faced with the seemingly massive spelling problems Wary has.
- Mark's Manager, Jerry (Dailan Evans) - Jerry is Mark's manager from the company, Spotfires LMTD. He constantly has to deal with Mark's scandals and suffers himself in the first-season finale, after being shot by Mark on a fox hunting outing.

=== Lola the Lollipop Lady Skits ===
Season 1

- Lola the Lollipop Lady (Aidan Fennessy) - Lola has violent outbursts toward anybody who disobeys the road rules, such as a woman whose car slightly touched the crossing's boundary line, and a young man whose car stereo was too loud.
- Nicholas - Lola usually talks to Nicholas before she allows anybody to cross the crossing. Known details about Nicholas is that he has two mums.

=== Pokie Ladies skits ===
Seasons 1 and 2

- Sherine and Leanne (Kate Jenkinson, Rebel Wilson) - Sherine and Leanne are two women who are usually seen playing on the poker machines. Sherine often rubs Leanne's stomach for good luck, and their gambling is often interrupted by Sherine's "bloody kids", whom she left in the downstairs car park, calling her on her mobile phone and reporting a disaster which Sherine often ignores.
- "The bloody kids" - The bloody kids are Sherine's seven unfortunate children. They are trapped in her car in the car park while Sherine plays pokies. Their names are Tyson, Britney, Trent, Braydon, Taylor, Jaydon, Phoenix and Corri-Nakita. They often complain about the amount of food that they are given and their brothers and sisters often suffocate. Sherine's reward for them being good is a 'cup of ice from the bistro'. In the first half of the first season, Tyson escapes from the car and is never mentioned again.

=== Art Cooney skits ===
Seasons 1 and 2

- Art Cooney (Adam Zwar) - Art is a presumably hippie substitute teacher at Wedgedale High. Art always manages to steer the lesson away from the actual topic and onto his bitterness about his ex-girlfriend and her new boyfriend, Dwayne. He is also obsessed with being politically incorrect, but this only makes life miserable for the people involved, as Art makes a big deal out of their sexuality, domestic life, religion or ethnicity in front of the entire class.
- Dallas - Dallas is an Aboriginal student in Art's class, and on the first day of school, Art tries to endear himself to her.
- Mya - Mya is a Chinese student in Art's class, but on first day of school he mistakenly thinks she is a Native American.
- Parents - Some parents including two lesbians and a blind person are called to a parent/teacher interview with Art and are often insulted in the same way the students are insulted.

=== Henry Bumstead skits ===
Season 1

- Henry Bumstead (Adam Zwar) - Henry is a young man on the dole with delusions of grandeur. Instead of applying for jobs and working his way up, Henry wants to fast-track his way to the top, so he attempts to join the Sydney Swans Football Club, become the voice of Big Brother and take over the mantle of Australia's richest man.
- Daryl Somers - See Daryl Somers

=== 'Fat' Mandi skits ===
Seasons 1 and 2

- Fat Mandi (Rebel Wilson) Mandi is an overweight English girl whose parents have sent her to Australia to appear on a reality TV show called "Fat Crackers", similar to The Biggest Loser. Instead of losing weight, she smuggles junk food into the camp to feed herself and the other contestants, in a parody of The Great Escape. On the second season, Mandi makes a comeback on her very own reality TV series.
- Mandi's Parents (Julie Eckersly), (Ross Daniels) - Both of Mandi's parents take life without Mandi very differently. Mandi's mum, is more concerned and worried for Mandi and decides to go to fat camp to check on Mandi, while her father couldn't care less by claiming that "when she comes around, everyone's squished against the wall".
- Peter Klink (Anthony Ahern) - Peter is the psychotic head trainer of Fat Crackers Fat Camp. He claims that he has sympathy for fat people but does not display that. Throughout Mandi's time at fight camp, he was very biased against her and unforgiving.
- Sir Richard (Dailan Evans) - Sir Richard is the founder of Fat Camp Australia, little is known about him except that he declared for no Fat Camp at the end of the season of Fat Crackers.
- Dr. Von Trouser Mussel (Julia Zemiro) - The doctor is the psychiatrist of Fat Crackers Fat Camp and she counsels Mandi during Fat Camp.

=== Karla Bangs School of Dance Xcellence skits ===
Seasons 1 and 2

- Karla Bangs (Rebel Wilson) - Karla is the principal and dance instructor at Karla Bangs' School of Dance Xcellence. She is incredibly harsh on her students and assistant, but fawns over an overweight, uncoordinated girl called Kiki. On the second season of The Wedge, she coaches Kiki on the television show, So You Think You Can Dance Wedgedale.
- Kiki (Rebel Wilson) - Kiki is Karla's favourite student and most prized possession. There have been rumours that Kiki may be Karla's illegitimate daughter. Kiki is rewarded the lead roles to the Funk FX Dance Spectacular from Karla even though her lack of talent is obvious, and the other students attending the dance school get jealous of her.
- Miss Nerida (Kate Jenkinson) - Miss Nerida used to be a student at Karla's dance school but since became Karla's personal assistant. She is compassionate for the other students at the dance school, she too thinks it isn't fair that Kiki gets all the lead roles for the Dance Spectacular. Nerida complains about the unfair treatment, and once said she had considered killing Karla but wouldn't, because Karla said that young ballerinas who go to prison become "the butch one's bitches"
- Brendan and Deerdrie (Dailan Evans, Marney McQueen) - Deerdrie is the old lady who makes the costumes from the dance spectacular, she often complains to Karla about the quantity of costumes she must make but sinks into the shadows when Karla reminds her that she has attorney over her husband's life support arrangements. Brendan is Karla's handyman and he is often told to fix chairs and fix the lights.

=== "Big" Mike Small skits ===
Seasons 1 and 2

- Big Mike Small (Adam Zwar) - Security guard, 'Big' Mike small patrols the Wedgedale Shopping Plaza with his 734 keys. He's often too busy eating donuts or picking up Kerry, the girl at the information desk, to apprehend thieves or people brawling in the supermarket. He is often careless with the keys, allowing a small child to steal them while he's lecturing them on shoplifting. In the second series of The Wedge, he is upgraded to a water policeman and becomes a nuisance while patrolling the waters as he ensures that everybody follows the strict water restrictions.
- Kerry (Kate Jenkinson) - Kerry is the girl that Mike has a crush on and usually picks up; she is annoyed with Mike but doesn't have the heart to say it.
- Oric (Anthony Ahern) - Oric is the detective at Wedgedale Plaza. When Mike reveals to Kerry he secretly had a crush on her, she is seen walking with Oric, suggesting that they are together.
- Rodger (Aidan Fennessy) - Rodger, unlike Oric and Kerry, is more compassionate, supportive and patient to Mike. He is the janitor of Wedgedale Plaza. It is implied that he is Scottish because he speaks with a Scottish accent.

=== Robbie Fowler skits ===
Season 1

- Robbie Fowler (Dailan Evans)- Robbie is a man with a beard who says he is "running for a reason", although he has long forgotten that reason. He has been running for over 1598 days and the fatigue causes him to hallucinate that there is another man called Kevin running alongside him, and he also catches glimpses of the grim reaper from time to time. At the end of the first season, he arrives back at Wedgedale but can't stop running.
- Robbie's Wife and Brother (Rebel Wilson, Jason Gann)- Robbie's wife and brother are often shown driving the 'Running For A Reason' van but sometimes his wife comes out to hand him some water.
- Kevin - Kevin is Robbie's imaginary friend but towards the end of the season, Robbie gets fed up with him and leaves him.

=== Wedgetel Call Center skits ===
Season 1

- Harebijhan (Dailan Evans) - Harebijhan is a worker from the Wedgetel Call Center. He often misunderstands the slang and words his Australian customers use, making unintentionally funny mistakes while trying to figure out what they mean. This is inspired by the large number of Australian call centres located in India.
- Danica (Kate Jenkinson) - Danica is the solution to Harebijhan's problem when he has trouble understanding his customer but unfortunately she also does not properly understand these issues, often giving misinterpreted advice.
- Sanjay (Jason Gann) - Little is known about this worker, however, he does appear for Harebijhan's birthday and does help when a customer is stubborn.

=== The Chainsaw Guy skits ===
Season 1

- The Chainsaw Guy (Dailan Evans) - The Chainsaw Guy (whose name is revealed to be Jason Jenkinson) attempts to murder people in the style of Friday the 13th character Jason Voorhees, but something always goes wrong with his murder weapon at the last minute.
- The Chainsaw Guy's Girlfriend (Kate Jenkinson) - The Chainsaw Guy's girlfriend is seen wearing facial bandages. She was introduced later in the first series. She is the Chainsaw Guy's only friend and companion. She is often seen in sketches where she becomes victim to one of the Chainsaw Guy's mistakes.

=== Plastic Surgeons' Wives skits ===
Season 1

- Plastic Surgeons' Wives (Julie Eckersley, Julia Zemiro)- Cameron and Pierce's wives have undergone so much plastic surgery that they've lost the use of their facial muscles, meaning they cannot speak properly, and are either subtitled or completely incomprehensible. Several times it has been implied they are hundreds, possibly thousands of years old, or even older than God.
- Cameron and Pierce (Dailan Evans, Aidan Fennessy)- These men are plastic surgeons and the husbands of the Plastic Surgeons' Wives. Cameron is usually seen 'doodling' on a woman at the bar or restaurant they are in.

=== Zak's Home Videos skits ===
Season 1

- Zak and his family (Julie Eckersley, Dailan Evans)- Zak is a ten-year-old boy who makes home movies about his mother (Julie Eckersley) and father (Dailan Evans). Each video involves Zak's father attempting a project, such as going on a camping trip or cooking a barbecue dinner, but they always end disastrously. Zak is oblivious to this and constantly praises his father's skill and ingenuity, much to Zak's mother's dismay.
- Zak's Friends - Zak's friends appear time to time in his home videos. They are often seen trying to get away from Zak's dad.
- Lizard and Candy (Aidan Fennessy, Katrina Mathers) - Zak's neighbours are often seen in his videos. Zak's dad often helps Candy in an affectionate way without knowing that Candy is flirting with him. Zak's dad sometimes, destroy's their garden or pool while trying to fix his problems.

=== Wedgies Drive Thru skits ===
Season 1

- Karen (Julie Eckersley) - Karen is a 16-year-old girl with a lisp who works at Wedgies. Karen takes her job incredibly seriously and is keen to pass on her accumulated 'wisdom' about selling potato by-products to Deirdre, the trainee under her care.
- Deirdre (Frieda McKenna) - Deirdre is the trainee under Karen's care. She is usually victim to one Karen's boring tales and speaking lessons and mistreated racially by Karen, who doesn't realise what she's done wrong.

=== Other skits ===
- Marileise (Rebel Wilson), is Wedgedale's own extremely dodgy dog-show trainer from South Africa, who loves to colour her classes with suspect apartheid references.
- Judy (Katrina Mathers) - Judy is an offensive shopping spruiker in a shopping centre, who insults passers-by comparing their outfits with what's on sale inside the store.
- Clare Douglas (Julie Eckersley) who, when selling houses, finds that something in the house (such as a double bed or double garage) reminds her of the time her husband left her for another woman, and begins acting her painful memories in front of her clients..
- The Snipper (Dailan Evans)¹, a mysterious man with a pair of scissors who appears at random and cuts things, such as the string on a child's kite or the ribbon at the grand opening of a building. Nothing else is known about him and he has no dialogue. About four different cast or crew members have played the Snipper.
- Shane and Roach (Anthony Ahern and Jason Gann), two criminals who "stake out" unconventional locations, such as a blood drive.
- Sandra Sultry (Katrina Mathers), a television reporter who strips off while reporting and is often caught frankly discussing her sexual exploits without realising that she's on camera. She is a parody of Network Ten news anchor Sandra Sully.
- Keith and Tina (Jason Gann and Rebel Wilson) own a business called 'Keith and Tina's Home Direct'. They sell a variety of products, however they are all of poor quality, such as a vacuum cleaner that they claim will suck evil spirits from people during exorcisms.
- The Ungrateful Beggars (Ross Daniels and Adam Zwar), one of the beggars start of with a new theory of his while the other one receives a good or money. The other beggar the complains about the goods or quantity of money the other beggar received, even though the items are worth a lot of money, such as a set of golf clubs or stock shares.
- Tarquin and Lucretia (Jason Gann, Julie Eckersley), a gothic couple whose conversations, such as arguing over what shade of black to paint their walls, parody the goth sub-culture.
- The Mayor, Kev Du Pont (Aidan Fennessy), the mayor of Wedgedale has made several appearances on news reports and been seen in one of the sketches with the Snipper.

¹ Note that there have been different members of the cast that have played that role but Dailan was the main person.

=== Cooking Shows skits ===
  - Gandalf the Grey (Anthony Ahern) - Cooks calamari rings in a parody of the scene in The Lord of the Rings where he is tempted to take the Ring.
  - Bono from U2 (Anthony Ahern) - Parodies his work in charity to save the "starvin' children".
  - Australian Idol - Casey Donovan (Rebel Wilson) cooks a "light and healthy" snack; chocolate mudcake with cream. She starts off by getting 1 kg of icing sugar and 24 eggs, but is eventually stopped by Mark Holden (Anthony Ahern) . Mark has also appeared as the guest judge for Wedgedale Idol.
  - Robert De Niro (Anthony Ahern)- Parodies his role in Meet the Parents and Meet the Fockers.
  - Kostya Tszyu (Anthony Ahern) - Cooks a rabbit dish in the style of a boxing match, hinting boxing phrases and attitude throughout his scene.
  - David Beckham (Anthony Ahern)- Claims to be making an easy meal, (Cock in a tarp) but has trouble reading the recipe. He calls his wife Victoria (Marney McQueen) in, but she too struggles with the recipe.
  - Christopher Walken (Anthony Ahern)- Tries to make a meal with a chicken, but going on about hunting down the chicken, watching it die, etc., parodying Christopher Walken's tendency to take roles as villainous psychopathic and creepy acting roles. Christopher's odd mannerisms are made fun of, such as his deadpan voice. Christopher also hosted his own dating show and arts and craft show.
  - Harry Potter (Dailan Evans) - Hermione Granger (Marney McQueen) and Harry make out, then they decide to eat some tomatoes but are interrupted by Snape (Anthony Ahern) catches them and they are told to go back to bed, which the two seem to be happy about.
  - Paris Hilton (Katrina Mathers) - Tries to make a "Flakey Tart" by ordering it from room service. She promptly flirts with the guy taking it to her.
  - Russell Crowe (Anthony Ahern) - In his "Gladiator" outfit, he uses a phone to tenderise the meat he was preparing. This is a reference to his phone-throwing incident in 2005.
  - Pamela Anderson (Julie Eckersley) - Attempts to make an American aging fruitcake and deliberately being clumsy to expose herself in a sexual way.
  - The Olsen Twins (Katrina Mathers, Marney McQueen) - Over talks about their DVDs until time has ended as a hoax to get people to buy their DVDs.

=== Wedgedale High's Spelling Bee skits ===
- Timmy Fudd (Dailan Evans), a nervous boy who is given especially difficult words, such as antitransubstantionalist, which cause him to have a nervous breakdown on stage and faint.
- Lily Pervo (Kate Jenkinson), a girl who openly flirts with the judge while spelling words like jailbait, manipulate and climax. Her contestant number is 69.
- Amanda Schdintzon, (Julie Eckersley) a student who knows every word that the co-ordinator is about to say.
- William Bunt (Jason Gann), an extremely offensive child.
- Albert Yolkool (Adam Zwar), a boy who spells without opening his mouth and heckles the audience in the style of a ventriloquist.
- Gretchin Davies (Marnie McQueen), a girl who depicts/acts out the words she is given.
- The Judges There are two judges, one male and one female. The male judge is often caught enjoying Lily Pervo's flirting, such as when Lily spells climax and pretends to have an orgasm while sounding out the letters i, m and a and he usually sais "That's good... uh I mean correct" or when she is having trouble with a word, a licks her lollipop in a sexual way or slowly lifts up her skirt he spells it for her. The female judge speaks with a deadpan and can be very harsh.

=== The Veggies skits ===
Season 1

The Veggies are a fictional unsuccessful children's entertainer group. They do poorly when entertaining on stage and they are seen as having a failing career. The Veggies is a parody of a successful real-life children's band, The Wiggles.

- Kevin Carrot (Dailan Evans), the captain of kid's band, 'The Veggies'. It is implied that he is homophobic.
- Patrick Pumpkin (Anthony Ahern), the songwriter of kid's band, 'The Veggies'. It is implied that he is homosexual as he has a crush for the Australian band, Wolfmother.
- Bok Choy (Frieda McKenna), the over-serious member of kid's band, 'The Veggies'.
- Suzie Spud (Marney McQueen), the head singer of the kid's band, 'The Veggies'. Suzie is the only popular member of the Veggies. She is also the only one with any musical talent, although it hints that the reason she is popular is because of her overt sexual body language.
- Rodney Rhubarb (Jason Gann), the manager and artist of the kid's band, 'The Veggies'. He is often drunk or suffering from a hang over.

=== Wedgedale Idol ===
Season 1

The Wedge has a series of sketches called Wedgedale Idol. These sketches parody the singing contest, Australian Idol. Each time the sketches appear we see the characters trying their luck at fame and fortune.

Mark Holden (Anthony Ahern) is the over energetic judge from Australian Idol who makes a guest judge appearance on Wedgedale Idol. He is very unreasonable with his judging comments, often because it is an excuse to be able to use his slang in front of the contestant.

The characters that have made an appearance on Wedgedale Idol are:

- Jack Farmer
- 'Big' Mike Small
- Art Cooney
- Karen
- Sherine and LeAnne
- The Ungrateful Beggars
- Lucy Webster

== Season two ==
=== The Embarrassing Mum skits ===
- The Emabrassing Mum (Julie Eckersley), the mum that every kid dreads. She is indiscreet and causes her two children to blush when she allows their embarrassing secrets to slip. Her two children are played by two young Australian actors Rachel Lee and Jack Martin.

=== Ernie Bird skits ===
- Ernie Bird (Adam Zwar), the passionate but somewhat deluded coach of the Wedgedale Hopping Mice, the local Under 11 team. He takes his role as seriously as if he were in the AFL, but his players and parents can't take Ernie so seriously. Ernie often makes bias decisions when placing his players in the various positions and uses ridiculous methods to make his team work hard.

=== Constable Roland skits ===
- Constable Roland (Dailan Evans), the perpetually afflicted breath test cop

=== The Grid Girls skits ===
- Grid Girls (Cal Wilson, Kate Jenkinson), two brainiac woman caught in the bodies and personas of two sexy promo girls. The two girls often give intelligent advice to racers and fix up their cars but cover up that in a ridiculous way.

=== Helpful Hailey skits ===
- Helpful Hailey (Cal Wilson), Hailey is that seriously weird girl that you find in every office, always eager to please but disturbing in her ability to make those around her feel uncomfortable.

=== Lucky skits ===
- Lucky (Adam Zwar), Lucky is the local busy body who makes it his business to know far too much about everyone else's personal lives and is happy to reveal all his gossip at the most embarrassing moments.

=== Noel skits ===
- Noel (Dailan Evans), Noel is a business consultant and all round nice guy who uses a wheelchair.

=== The Sexpot Granny skits ===
- Sexpot Granny (Julie Eckersley), The decrepit granny may have all the physical signs of aging but that doesn't stop her from providing outrageously descriptive suggestions about her sexual prowess, no matter who is around to hear them.

=== Constable Peaks and Sergeant Spanky skits ===
- Constable Peaks and Sergeant Spanky (Cal Wilson), Meet Wedgedale's charming new constable, Constable Peaks. She's as sympathetic as a cop can be... but her ever-present partner Sgt. Spanky is the rogue cop from hell.

=== The Tattoo Artist skits ===
- Tattoo Artist (Jason Gann), Wedgedale's worst tattoo artist. He is distracted, discourteous and dyslexic.

=== Father Inappropriate skits ===
- Father Inappropriate (Damian Callinan), A highly irreverent reverend, Father Inappropriate manages to offend his parishioners with highly inappropriate suggestions.

=== Cliché Couple skits ===
- Cliché Couple (Kate Jenkinson, Anthony Ahern)

=== Wedgebank skits ===
- Wedgebank (Cal Wilson), (Dailan Evans), Wedgedale's ever smiling bank staff provide a vicious pastiche of the highly recognisable 'we are happy to help you' bank adverts.
