= Des Dowling =

Australian comedian, actor, writer and producer

- Born: Australia
- Occupation: Comedian

Des Dowling is an Australian comedian, actor, writer and producer, best known for his work on Australian TV shows including The Wedge, Agony Uncles, Coxy's Big Break, Mark Loves Sharon, Kinne, Talk To the Animals and Manspace.

== Career ==
Dowling began his career as a news and current affairs reporter working for ABC Television, Nine Network and the Seven Network. He left journalism in 1997 after deciding that a career that made people laugh rather than made them cry would be a nobler profession.

Dowling began his comedy career in the series Headliners where he played himself, and this led to radio work at Mix 101.1 and 3AW, and also to a regular spot on 1116 SEN. Dowling has written and performed several shows at the Melbourne International Comedy Festival and performed stand-up in Canada and the UK.

He is known for his sketch comedy writing, having written and produced for the AFL Footy Show and the Logie award nominated mockumentary series Mark Loves Sharon. He currently writes for Channel 10's Family Feud.

Dowling is the co-founder of the Albury-Wodonga Comedy Festival and runs his own booking agency for comedians.

== Personal life ==
Dowling lives in rural Victoria with his wife Jen Dowling and their three children.
