= Whatever Happened to That Guy? =

- Genre: Comedy
- Written by: Elizabeth Coleman; Brendan Luno; Doug MacLeod; Peter Moon; Marilyn Tofler
- Directed by: Ted Emery
- Starring: Peter Moon
- Country of origin: Australia
- Original language: English
- No. of seasons: 1
- No. of episodes: 8

Production
- Executive producers: Kim Vecera; Darren Chau (the Comedy Channel)
- Producers: Stephen Luby; Mark Ruse
- Cinematography: Andrew Topp
- Editor: Steven Robinson
- Running time: 30 minutes (including commercials)

Original release
- Network: The Comedy Channel
- Release: 25 May – 17 July 2009

Whatever Happened to That Guy? is an Australian comedy series produced for The Comedy Channel. The series is a self-referential comedy series about the diminishing spotlight of a once-glorious comic, played by Peter Moon.

== Synopsis ==
Peter Moon, a comedian and star of television sketch comedy Fast Forward and breakfast radio, is unemployed and facing a feeling of general redundancy and having ‘too much time on his hands’. Moon now seeks distraction in forms such as a crusading consumer, bargain hunter; potential entrepreneur, inventor and budding film maker.

The show features some performers playing themselves, and others in broader comedic cameos, including Michael Veitch, Red Symons, John Blackman, Bruce Beresford, Greg McLean, Alyce Platt, Peter Smith and Wilbur Wilde. Moon's own family also appears.

This show could be considered to be the Australian equivalent to Larry David's Curb Your Enthusiasm.

== Cast ==
- Peter Moon as Peter Moon
- Andrea Powell as Andrea Moon
- Paul Ireland as Bruno Stephens
- Benn Welford as Benn
- Tegan Higginbotham as Tegan
- Tony Rickards as Lance Purves
- Jeremy Kewley as Dr Jeremy Kewley
- Maria Theodorakis as Lana Fink
- Luke Lennox as Luke Kewley
- Tony Nikolakopoulos as Nick
- Eddie Baroo as Eddie
- Damian Walshe-Howling as Jarred

== Episodes ==
=== Season 1 (2009) ===
1. "Sicko" – 25 May 2009
2. "How Now Bryan Brown?" – 1 June 2009
3. "Fat Pig" – 8 June 2009
4. "Nasal Distribution" – 15 June 2009
5. "Rhonda" – 26 June 2009
6. "Charity" – 3 July 2009
7. "A Dog Ate My USB Key" – 10 July 2009
8. "Kenny Moon" – 17 July 2009

== See also ==
- List of Australian television series
