= Eagle & Evans =

Eagle & Evans is an episodic Australian sketch show and comedy series that first screened on ABC TV in 2004. The series of eight episodes was set in a fictional variety show The Blaze da Silva Experience. The main characters, Eagle and Evans, are the warm-up act for Blaze da Silva, the self-titled "most loved man on television".

The series was created and co-authored by Craig Eagle and Dailan Evans along with staff writers Nicholas Bufalo (who also directed the series), Anita Punton, Tal Brott, Mike Flattley and Nick Venus, with contributions by Tim Smith. The script editor was guest star Bob Franklin.

== Cast ==
- Craig Eagle as Craig / various characters
- Dailan Evans as Dailan / various characters
- Anita Punton as various characters
- Tal Brott as various characters
- Michael Flattley as various characters
- Nick Venus as Blaze Da Silva / various characters
- Bob Franklin as Comedian / Host of 'Big Nasty Planet' / Movie star
- Ross Daniels as Des / JJ
- Andrew Goodone as Boardroom Knight / Eddie
- Elke Berry as Janey's Mum
- Mark Mitchell as Ron Salisbury
- Tayler Kane as Bouncer
- Michael Ward as Husband on couch
- Dave Grant as Blaze's heavy
- Brad Oakes as Blaze's heavy
- Sancia Robinson as Indian restaurant patron
- Laura Waters as Mrs Peters
- George Negus as himself
