= Peter Moon (comedian) =

Australian comedian (born 1953)

- Born: 18 January 1953 (age 73); Yarram, Victoria, Australia
- Occupation: Comedian

Peter Moon (born 18 January 1953) is an Australian comedian, best known for writing and performing in the sketch comedy Fast Forward.

== Biography ==
Moon was born in Yarram, Victoria.

On Fast Forward, his characters were often oafish sidekicks to more dominant characters played by Steve Vizard, including Barry the advertising executive and Abdul the Persian carpet salesman. Moon appeared in one of the show's best-known parodies, of the Kung Fu television series (also opposite Vizard), and as the "very unattractive" Soviet newsreader Victor with Jane Turner as Svetta.

After Fast Forward, Moon worked as a writer and occasional guest performer on its successor, Full Frontal, and various other comedy series, usually alongside other Fast Forward alumni. In 1995 Moon joined the 2Day FM Morning Crew breakfast radio show, co-hosting alongside Wendy Harmer. For 8 years this was consistently the highest rating FM Breakfast show in Sydney, until animosity between the two hosts, together with Moon increasingly delivering his content for the show from a studio in Melbourne, led to him being axed in 2002. The new duo of Greg Fleet and Harmer rated poorly and Morning Crew was taken off air at the end of the following year.

Moon also played Samuel Marsden in the historical sit-com Bligh, and appeared in Bill Bennett's Film The Nugget. Since then Moon has been developing film and television projects and making occasional appearances in shows such as 20 to 1 and Let Loose Live. He wrote, produced and appeared in The Comedy Channel's sitcom Whatever Happened To That Guy?, which is loosely based on his post-fame life.

In 2010, Moon joined the cast of Neighbours on a recurring basis as theatre producer Terry Kearney.

He is also the treasurer of the Australian Writers Guild.

== Personal life ==
Moon has three children. He lives with his partner Jane Hopkins at a farmhouse in Trentham, Victoria.

== Filmography ==
=== Film ===
Year	Title	Role	Type
1982	Snow: The Movie	Bruno	Feature film
1984	Future Schlock	Minister	Feature film
1984	Channel Chaos	Dick Jones	Feature film
1984	The Bark is Worse than the Byte		Short film
1993	The Making of Nothing	Cinematographer	TV movie
1997	The Alive Tribe	Priest	Feature film
1999	Kaylocks	Flint	Short film
2002	The Nugget	Ratner	Feature film
2005	Marti's Party	Keith	Short film
2007	Little Deaths	Sleazy Salesman	Feature film
2008	Making Plans for Roland	Basil Panitidis	Short film

=== Television ===
Year	Title	Role	Type
1984	The Gillies Report	Various characters	TV sketch series
1983; 1985	Prisoner	Parish Priest / Bob Barker	TV series, 2 episodes
1984	Special Squad	Eddie	TV series, 1 episode
1984	Carson's Law	Judges Associate	TV series, 2 episodes
1985	Anzacs	English Batman	TV miniseries, 1 episode
1985	The Eleventh Hour	Various characters	TV series
1986	The Lancaster Miller Affair	Reporter #2	TV miniseries, 3 episodes
1988	Sentiments	Customer	TV series, 1 episode
1986; 1988	The Flying Doctors	Repossessor / Clem	TV series, 2 episodes
1989–92	Fast Forward	Barry / Abdul / Victor / various characters	TV sketch series, 90 episodes
1992	Bligh	Reverend Samuel Marsden / King George III	TV series, 13 episodes
1993–96	Full Frontal	Guest performer	TV sketch series, 13 episodes
	20 to 1		TV series
1999	The Late Report	Various characters	TV comedy special, 1 episode
2001	Pizza	Morning Crew	TV series, 1 episode
2005	Let Loose Live	Various characters	TV sketch series, 2 episodes
2009	Whatever Happened to That Guy?	Peter Moon	TV series, 8 episodes (also writer / producer)
2010	Neighbours	Terry Kearney	TV series, 11 episodes
2010	City Homicide	Lars Keller	TV series, 1 episode
2013	Underbelly: Squizzy	Leo	TV series, 5 episodes

== Radio ==
Year	Title	Role	Type
1995–2002	2Day FM Morning Crew	Co-host (with Wendy Harmer)	Breakfast radio show
