= Dave Grant =

Australian comedian (1959–2010)

Dave Grant (22 January 1959 – 24 January 2010) was an Australian stand-up comedian.

== Early life and education ==
David Christopher James Grant was born in Govan, Scotland to John Douglas (Doug) Grant and Esther Ida Grant, nee Beti. Doug and Ida had married in Melbourne, Australia, his father’s hometown, in 1954. In 1962, when Dave was three years old, the family sailed back to Australia aboard the SS Canberra, including his older sisters Pamela and Barbara and younger sister Elaine. They settled in Mornington initially then nearby Doveton where three more children - Albert, Roxanne and Karen - were born.

== Career ==
Grant began his comedy career writing for local comedians. In November 1990, he performed his first stand-up routine in a bar in North Melbourne that attracted shift workers from the neighbouring wharfs. Grant toured Australia performing his comedy and also performed an open mic in New York. Grant fathered a daughter, Marieke, when he was 20.

Whilst working as a comic host of Hen's Night bus tours Grant met Karen Livingstone, sister of Olympian swimmer Nicole Livingstone. Grant and Livingstone became partners a few months later, living in her family home in Carlton, Victoria. The pair had two children; Madeleine and Spencer.

Grant performed in comedy clubs and on talk shows for twenty years, including Rove . He joined an Australia comedy showcase tour to Los Angeles in 1999. In 2006 he created a comedy routine for the Royal Automobile Club of Victoria to encourage young drivers not to drive while sleep-deprived, and performed it for students at Victoria University.

Grant's comedy often revolved around men's health and men's behaviour. He performed twelve one man comedy shows at the Melbourne International Comedy Festival. He had guest acting roles in series such as Neighbours, Stingers, and Eagle & Evans, as well as the 2008 short film, The Un-Australian.

Grant often mentored younger comics. He also monitored the seating, the lights, the support performers and the MC at his comedy shows. Grant closed each routine with "Look after each other brothers and sisters, that's what it's all about!"

== Death and legacy ==
Grant was diagnosed with pancreatic cancer in 2009. 'Doin it for Dave' benefit gigs, supported by many comedians and comedy promoters, were held in various cities in Australia to raise funds to support Grant and his family. His final comedy performance was on 1 July 2009. Despite alternative treatment in Tijuana and conventional treatment in Australia, Grant's health deteriorated. He died at home on 24 January 2010.

Fellow performers paid tribute to Dave with posts online. A compilation of Grant's comedy was made after his death, entitled Is It Just Me?. The disc features an introduction from Rove McManus, who first met Dave in Perth in the early 1990s.

A grant is presented in his name to emerging comedians who are participating in their first Adelaide Fringe comedy show.

Anh Do's book 'The Happiest Refugee' is dedicated to Dave.
