= The Alive Tribe =

- Directed by: Stephen Amis
- Written by: Stephen Amis
- Starring: Craig Adams; Kate Atchenson
- Release date: 1998
- Country: Australia
- Language: English
- Budget: $30,000

The Alive Tribe is a 1997 Australian film directed by Stephen Amis and starring Craig Adams and Kate Atchenson. The film is about a young man who gets involved with eco-terrorists.

== Cast ==
- Craig Adams
- Kate Atchenson
- Peter Moon as Priest
