= Let Loose Live =

- Title card
- Directed by: Ted Emery
- Starring: Peter Moon; Michael Veitch; Marg Downey; Colin Lane; Dave O'Neil; Jane Hall; Andrew Curry; Paul Calleja; Queenie van de Zandt; Kate McLennan; Sam McMillan; Julie Eckersley
- Country of origin: Australia
- No. of episodes: 2

Production
- Running time: approx 0:60 (including commercials)

Original release
- Network: Seven Network
- Release: 29 May – 5 June 2005

Let Loose Live, premiering on Sunday 29 May 2005, was an hour-long Australian live sketch comedy television programme loosely based on Saturday Night Live. At least two-thirds of each episode's content was broadcast live, requiring a large cast and crew. The show was broadcast on the Seven Network on Sunday nights at 8:30 PM, but was axed after just two episodes due to disappointing ratings. It was not replaced; instead, the Seven Network's regular Sunday night movies returned to the 8.30 slot.

Let Loose Live's cancellation was announced the day after the second episode aired. Tim Worner, Seven's programming boss, conceded that it did not live up to expectations despite being strongly promoted. According to OzTAM, 955,000 viewers tuned in to its pilot episode, but then the ratings plummeted almost by a third to 650,000 the following week. Not long after the cancellation, the Seven Network announced plans to reinstate the series during the summer (non-ratings) season, but nothing came of it.

Prior to the show's debut, director Ted Emery (Fast Forward, The Micallef Program, Kath & Kim) remarked in an interview that Let Loose Live would either 'soar majestically, or crash and burn'.

== Cast ==
- Peter Moon
- Michael Veitch
- Marg Downey
- Colin Lane
- Dave O'Neil
- Jane Hall
- Andrew Curry
- Paul Calleja
- Queenie van de Zandt
- Kate McLennan
- Sam McMillan
- Julie Eckersley

== Ratings ==
| Episode | Sydney | Melbourne | Brisbane | Adelaide | Perth | 5-City | RANK |
| 29 May 2005 | 262,000 | 322,000 | 127,000 | 107,000 | 138,000 | 955,000 | 71 |

== Guest Hosts ==
- Episode #1 - William McInnes (Sunday 29 May 2005)
- Episode #2 - Tom Williams (Sunday 5 June 2005)
- Episode #3 - Guy Sebastian (Failed to air)

== See also ==
- List of Seven Network programs
- List of Australian television series
