= The Craic =

- The Craic's DVD cover
- Directed by: Ted Emery
- Written by: Jimeoin
- Produced by: Marc Gracie; Jimeoin
- Starring: Jimeoin; Alan McKee; Bob Franklin; Colin Hay
- Cinematography: John Wheeler
- Edited by: Michael Collins
- Music by: Ricky Edwards
- Production companies: Australian Film Commission, The; Crack Pty. Ltd.; Foster Gracie; Geffer Notice; Village Roadshow Entertainment
- Distributed by: Roadshow Entertainment
- Release date: 29 April 1999
- Running time: 88 minutes
- Country: Australia
- Language: English
- Budget: Approximately $3.1 million
- Box office: $5.3 million

The Craic (stylised as The Craíc; pronounced /ˈkræk/) is a 1999 Australian comedy film starring stand-up comedian Jimeoin with Alan McKee, directed by Ted Emery.

== Plot ==
It is 1988, and two best friends from Ireland—Fergus Montagu (Jimeoin) and Wesley Murray (McKee)—flee from Belfast after a violent confrontation with Colin (Robert Morgan) of the IRA and illegally enter Australia, finding seasonal work picking fruit at orchards to afford hostels, sustenance and booze costs (but so cash-strapped, their whiskey and cokes are made by taking swigs of whiskey and coke, mixing the two on the fly in their mouth), the last often used to dull the two's fear of immigration officers.

After some gentle persuasion, Fergus goes on a TV dating game show and wins a trip to Queensland. This, however, occurs just as the pair's apartment is raided by immigration officer Derek Johnson (Nicolas Bell), and Wesley is forced to escape, eventually reuniting with his friend in Queensland. Meanwhile, Colin is sent to Australia in a witness protection program after he gives up some of his former colleagues, and (much to the scepticism of his watchers, the S.A.S.) names Fergus and Wesley as terrorists. Irritated by their lack of progress, he eventually takes off to find them himself.

The two make their way up the coast and become acquainted with backpackers Alice (Jane Hall) and Erica (played by Catherine Arena, Jimeoin's real-life wife) along the way. After their car overheats and explodes in the outback, the duo narrowly evade Colin, who has finally caught up with them. With the help of a local who calls himself Ron Barassi (Kyle Morrison) the duo make their way to a pub where immigration, the S.A.S. and a police force who discovered their burnt-out car and Colin have all arrived at. As the duo are being carted away, Colin shoots out the windows of the police car and the duo escape once more, running off into the sunset.

== Cast ==
- Jimeoin as Fergus Montagu
- Alan McKee as Wesley Murray
- Robert Morgan as Colin
- Nicholas Bell as Derek Johnson
- Jane Hall as Alice
- Catherine Arena as Erica
- Kyle Morrison as Ron Barassi
- Bob Franklin
- Colin Hay as Barry
- Reg Gorman as RSL Manager
- Bud Tingwell as Farmer
- Beverley Dunn as Farmer's Wife

== Reception ==
In a review in the long-running SBS Australian TV program, The Movie Show, cinema critic David Stratton described the film as an only intermittently funny road movie. Margaret Pomeranz agreed, finding the script underdeveloped, and the film itself "good-natured but really incredibly mundane".

Long running website efilmcritic.com's reviewer "Filmink Magazine (owes us money)" says "Jimeoin's challenged himself with a film and come off pretty well." and that "With a healthy measure of eighties nostalgia and a neat storyline, The Craic avoids falling into the trap of seeming like series of sketches pasted together.", talking of course about Jimeoin's roots as a stand-up comic and a TV comedy star of his show Jimeoin before this film was developed and released, his second film and first Lead role.

== Box office ==
The Craic grossed $5,265,935 at the box office in Australia.

It took almost $2 million during its first week in cinemas, placing it in the same opening league as acclaimed Australian films such as Muriel's Wedding and The Adventures of Priscilla: Queen of the Desert.

The average budget for films that year was $3,100,000 (according to the Australian Film Commission's Box Office Share report).
