= Snow: The Movie =

- Directed by: Robert Gibson
- Produced by: Eve Ash
- Starring: Peter Moon; David Argue
- Release date: 1982
- Country: Australia
- Language: English
- Budget: A$420,000

Snow: The Movie is a 1982 Australian comedy directed by Robert Gibson and starring Peter Moon and David Argue. It was filmed at Falls Creek.

== Cast ==
- Peter Moon as Bruno
- David Argue as Darren
- Ian McFadyen as Ian
