= Jimeoin =

Northern Irish Australian stand-up comedian and actor

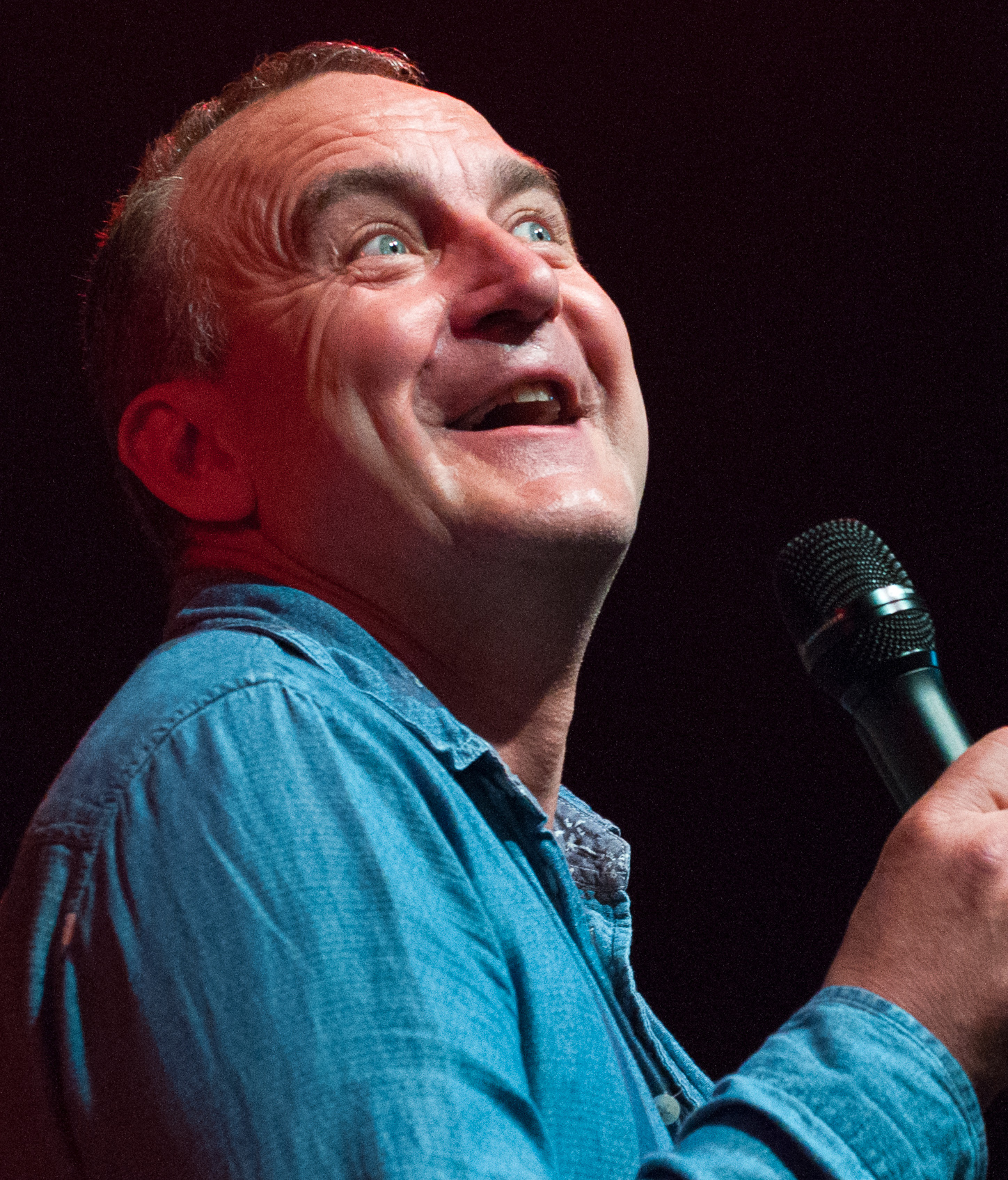
- Jimeoin performing in June 2015
- Born: James Eoin Stephen Paul McKeown; 24 January 1966 (age 60); Leamington Spa, England
- Occupations: Comedian, actor
- Years active: 1990–present
- Spouse: Catherine Arena (m. 2000)
- Children: 4
- Website: jimeoin.com

James Eoin Stephen Paul McKeown (born 24 January 1966), better known as Jimeoin (/dʒɪˈmoʊɪn/), is an Irish comedian and actor.

Jimeoin rose to prominence in the early 1990s in Australia, where he had his own TV show and where he still resides. He came to public attention in the UK between 2005 and 2008 while performing a tour of Australia's outback and major cities, which was filmed for the BBC Northern Ireland documentary Jimeoin Down Under. He has also gained international recognition and is a frequent performer at comedy festivals, including the Edinburgh Fringe, where he made his debut in 1993 and where he has since appeared every year.

== Early life ==
James Eoin Stephen Paul McKeown was born in Leamington Spa on 24 January 1966, the son of Irish parents. He grew up in the Northern Irish town of Portstewart, where he attended Dominican College. After working on building sites in London for four years, he moved to Australia at the age of 22 and found work as a gardener.

== Career ==
Jimeoin's UK television appearances include Sunday Night at the Palladium (ITV1), Live at the Apollo (BBC1), 8 Out of 10 Cats (Channel 4), The Royal Variety Performance (ITV), Channel 4's O2 Comedy Gala, Dave's One Night Stand, Edinburgh Comedy Festival – Live! (BBC3, three consecutive years), Monumental (BBC NI team captain, series I and II), Michael McIntyre's Comedy Roadshow (BBC1). He has also appeared on the Conan O'Brien Show in the US as well on a number of international specials for Montreal's Just for Laughs. in 2016 he guested on John Lloyd's Museum of Curiosity for BBC Radio 4.

He both starred in and co-wrote two Australian feature film comedies, The Craic (1999) and The Extra (2005), both co-starring Bob Franklin. He had his own comedy television program, the eponymous Jimeoin (1994–95) which ran for three seasons. He played Convict Griffin in the sitcom Bligh (1992).

He is also known for his extensive live comedy tours in Australia, New Zealand, Ireland and Great Britain. In 2013, he made his solo debut at London's Hammersmith Apollo and began to take his tours into the arenas, starting with the Belfast Odyssey Arena.

In 2010 he completed a new series Jimeoin: Over the Top for The Comedy Channel on Foxtel and Austar. The series features Jimeoin travelling across sections of northern Australia, interspersed with stand-up routines recorded at towns visited along the way.

During the 2014 FIFA World Cup, Jimeoin hosted Australian TV SBS's primetime comedy program The Full Brazilian, teaming up with the network's live coverage of 2014's World Cup games. The 25 live-to-air, hour-long shows were a mix of Jimeoin's stand-up, sketches, chat, football talk via satellite link to Rio de Janeiro, musical acts and guest comedians.

In 2025, Jimeoin participated in Saudi Arabia's Riyadh Comedy Festival, an event which Human Rights Watch characterized as an attempt by the Saudi government to whitewash its human rights abuses.

== Personal life ==
Jimeoin married Catherine Arena in 2000, and they reside in Melbourne with their four children. He is a fan of Australian football team South Melbourne FC. He said in a 2009 interview that he is "not really into that nationality thing" but revealed that he supports the Australian national football team, as well as supporting Australia in other sports, because "Ireland's shit at everything".

== Discography ==
=== Albums ===
List of albums, with selected chart positions
Title	Album details	Peak chart positions
Title	Album details	AUS
Goin' Off	Released: May 1993; Format: CD, Cassette; Label: Mushroom (D30969)	57
Crack	Released: 1995; Format: 2×CD; Label: Jimeoin (JIMEOINCD)	—
Forklift Truck	Released: 1997; Format: CD; Label: Jimeoin (JIMEOIN2); Recorded live in Edinburgh, Scotland, 24+25 August 1996.	—

=== Singles ===
List of singles, with selected chart positions
Title	Year	Peak chart positions	Album
Title	Year	AUS	Album
"Walk on the Wild Side"	1993	58	Goin' Off
"Danny Man"	1994	49	Goin' Off

=== DVDs ===
List of DVDs, with selected details
Title	Details
The Jimeoin: All Over the Shop	Released: 2001; Format: DVD; Label: Roadshow Entertainment (103328-9)
Third Drawer Down	Released: 2003; Format: DVD; Label: Rajon Vision (RV0216)
Jimeoin On Ice	Released: 2010; Format: DVD; Label: Beyond Home Entertainment (BHE3583)
Something Smells Funny	Released: 2012; Format: DVD; Label: Beyond Home Entertainment (BHE4025)
What?!	Released: 2014; Format: DVD

== Filmography ==
Year	Show	Role	Notes
1997	The Perfumer	Edward Pinchbeck	
1999	The Craic	Fergus Montagu	Feature film (also writer & producer)
2003	You Can't Stop the Murders	Burrito	Feature film
2005	The Extra	The Extra	Feature film (also writer)
2018	That's Not My Dog!	Self	Feature film

== Television and radio ==
Year	Show	Role	Notes
1993	Full Frontal	Various characters	Writer/actor
1992	Bligh	Convict Griffin	13 episodes

As himself

Year	Show	Notes
1991	The Big Gig	
1994–1995	Jimeoin	
1999	GNW Night Lite	1 episode
2000	Rove Live	11 episodes
2001	Jimeoin's Teatowel Tours: Northern Ireland	
2003	Just for Laughs	
2006	Thank God You're Here	
2008–present	Good News Week	5 episodes
2008	Out of the Question	
2010	Spicks and Specks	2 episodes
2010	Jimeoin: Over the Top	
2010	Michael McIntyre's Comedy Roadshow	
2010	Talkin' 'Bout Your Generation	
2010	Melbourne International Comedy Festival Gala	
2010	The 7pm Project	
2010, 2011, 2012	Edinburgh Comedy Festival – Live!	
2011	Statesmen of Comedy	
2011	Comedy Rocks with Jason Manford	
2011	Between the Lines	
2011	Live at the Apollo	
2011	The Royal Variety Performance	
2012	Channel 4's Comedy Gala in Aid of Great Ormond Street	
2012	Dave's One Night Stand	
2013	8 Out of 10 Cats	
2013	Adam Hills Tonight	
2013	Monumental, series I and II	6 + 7 episodes
2013	Live at the Apollo	
2014	The Full Brazilian	
2014	Sunday Night at the Palladium	
2016	Brexit at Tiffanys, Foxtel RX at Edinburgh fringe	
2016	Melbourne Comedy Festival OXFAM Gala	
2016	John Lloyd’s Museum of Curiosity for BBC Radio 4	

== Awards and nominations ==
=== ARIA Music Awards ===
The ARIA Music Awards are a set of annual ceremonies presented by Australian Recording Industry Association (ARIA), which recognise excellence, innovation, and achievement across all genres of the music of Australia. They commenced in 1987.

Year	Nominee / work	Award	Result	Ref.
1994	Goin' Off	Best Comedy Release	Nominated	
1995	Crack	Best Comedy Release	Nominated	
1998	Forklift Truck	Best Comedy Release	Nominated	
2005	Third Drawer Down	Best Comedy Release	Nominated	
2010	Jimeoin on Ice Live	Best Comedy Release	Nominated	
