= Jimeoin: Over the Top =

- Genre: Reality, comedy, stand-up comedy
- Created by: Jimeoin, Darren Chau
- Written by: Jimeoin, Darren Chau
- Presented by: Jimeoin
- Starring: Fergus Lagan, Hamish McCormick
- Country of origin: Australia
- Original language: English
- No. of seasons: 1
- No. of episodes: 8

Production
- Executive producer: Darren Chau
- Producers: Darren Chau, Andrea Williams
- Cinematography: Hamish McCormick
- Editor: Charme Lee
- Running time: 30 minutes (with commercials)

Original release
- Network: The Comedy Channel
- Release: 6 May 2010

Related
- Jimeoin

Jimeoin: Over the Top is an Australian reality, comedy and stand-up comedy television series starring English born Irish comedian Jimeoin, and created by Jimeoin with producer and The Comedy Channel programming director Darren Chau. The series features Jimeoin touring across the top of Australia, as well as special performances at the iconic Sydney Opera House, the Famous Spiegeltent, Jimeoin's Cooking Show filmed at the Adelaide Fringe Festival and a special episode in New Zealand. Jimeoin: Over the Top premiered on The Comedy Channel on 6 May 2010, and ranks among the top five highest-rating local productions in the Comedy Channel's history.
