= List of The Wedge episodes =

The following is a list of episodes for the Network Ten comedy series, The Wedge.

== Season one ==
=== We're Moving ===
| Original Air Date | TV Broadcast | Synopsis | # |
|---|---|---|---|
| 30 May 2006 | S01E01 | National Partying Championships take place at a home, where several guests battle it out to see who will claim the champion title. Hotdogs makes a guest appearance.; 'Cooking With Gandalf' sees calamari rings being made and Gandalf's obsession and temptation to take the ring.; Lucy Webster talks to Dylan about their relationship, and sends him a video card for Valentine's Day.; Jack Farmer talks about his family's farming heritage, all revealing to be failures.; Lola the Lollipop Lady bashes a cyclist who crosses the crossing line.; Sherine and Leanne try their luck to hit the jackpot at the pokies. | 1 |
| 6 June 2006 | S01E02 | Mark Warey has his 14th press conference this month, this time for a series of crimes such as assaulting a barman.; Jack Farmer shows us his form of communication in the bush, two cans and some strings.; 'Cooking with Bono' sees a chicken and beetroot dish being made, this is interrupted by Bono's outlooks on poverty.; Lucy Webster sends Dylan a new screensaver and talks about Courtney's 'accidental' allergy attack.; The WedgeTel call centre deals with an important caller, who has trouble 'getting it up'.; Wedgedale High welcomes a new replacement teacher, Art Cooney, and a new student, Dalis who's a native Australian.; Robbie Fowler continues his 'Running for a Reason' marathon around Australia.; On the TV show, 'Fat Crackers', Fat Mandi decides to go to fat camp in Wedgedale. | 2 |
| 13 June 2006 | S01E03 | Marileise, the extremely dodgy dog show trainer from South Africa teaches her philosophy on Dog Showing.; Goths Tarquin and Lucretia, move into the neighbourhood where they choose a house responsible for many deaths.; Mark Warey apologises again, this time for an incident on board an airliner. | 3 |
| 20 June 2006 | S01E04 | The plastic surgeon's wives and their husbands make an appearance.; 'Cooking with Australian Idol' sees Casey Donovan making a chocolate mud cake with cream, before seeing Mark Holden criticise with his unusual gibberish.; Goths Tarquin and Lucretia decorate their new home with black paint.; Fat Mandi arrives at Fat Crackers Fat Camp and has some confusions as to what 'weigh-in' means.; Zak's home videos debut, with Zak's dad tackling a gardening issue. | 4 |
| 22 June 2006 | S01E05 | Robbie Fowler is still on his marathon but makes sure to make time for his mother's birthday.; WedgeTel's call centre takes an emergency call, this time with an explosion in the dunny.; Jack assesses his losses from a bush fire.; Lucy is confused by Dylan's mixed signals and believes it's time they got back together.; Fat Mandi has her initial weigh-in at fat camp as her parents deal with her absence in very different ways.; Wedgedale Plaza's number one security guard, 'Big' Mike Small, is too distracted to notice a brawl happening near him. | 5 |
| 27 June 2006 | S01E06 | Jack and Jill's drive through fast food outlet fails to attract any interest out in the bush.; Art Cooney counsels a pregnant student with unhelpful comments.; The reality of Fat Camp, and the chafing, begins to set in for Mandi and her fellow fat campers.; Security guard "Big" Mike Small encounters the Chainsaw Guy, the Chainsaw Guy, blundering, yet again.; 'Keith and Tina's Home Direct' demonstrate their latest product, Demon Spirit Sucker 2000, which is obviously a vacuum cleaner covered in tin foil. | 6 |

=== Lucky ===
| Original Air Date | TV Broadcast | Synopsis | # |
|---|---|---|---|
| 4 July 2006 | S01E07 | Lucy continues to stalk Dylan by accusing his friend, Damien, of being gay.; Jack and Jill Farmer waste wine that is potentially useful because it's 100 years old.; Mandi makes an emergency phone call to her parents, requesting food. | 7 |
| 11 July 2006 | S01E08 | Timmy tackles the mother of all spelling words, 'antitransubtionalistist' with outrageous asthma attacks and faintings nearing time he almost figures the word out.; The plastic surgeons wives stop for gas at the petrol station to pump up their breasts.; Sherine keeps her kids safe from social services by repeatedly telling her kids to drive and hit the social services woman, Bronwan.; Art Cooney receives an unexpected visit from the Headmistress of Wedgedale High after saying rude poetry in front of the students.; Zak's dad show him and his friends how to play cricket.; Clare shows a home to a recently separated client, later revealed to have cheated on his wife for his wife's sister, this is exactly the same as to what happened to Clare.; Lucy won't let a firewall stand between her and Dylan by installing a program into his computer.; Lola the Lollipop Lady has another violent outbreak with a motorist, this time using her stop sign as a javelin. | 8 |
| 18 July 2006 | S01E09 | The WedgeTel Call Centre handles a call of quantum proportions.; Fat Mandi digs into her hidden stash of sweets while her parents make plans to rescue their daughter.; National Wedding Championships take place, ending with a double marriage.; Sandra Sultry is a victim of the anonymous snipper.; On day 1408 of his run, Robbie Fowler reflects on his faithful wife, who has been there for him every day. | 9 |
| 25 July 2006 | S01E10 | Cooking with the Becks sees an easy to cook meal, cock in a tarp, being made.; Sherine explains how you 'make kids' to her kids.; Lucy sets up home security cameras for Dylan, one outside the main window of his bedroom, the other another window of his bedroom and the last one, in the bathroom.; Henry Bumstead's intentions turns to getting a date. | 10 |
| 1 August 2006 | S01E11 | Jack and Jill Farmer sees the end of the drought with a flood.; Mark Warey addresses the media in regard to the photos of him leaving a "gentleman's club"; Art Cooney counsels a student at the end of his rope by calling him a misery guts.; Lucy asks Dylan about the complaint he made against her to the school counsellor, Ms Rogers.; The Plastic surgeons, Cameron and Piece examine Cameron's latest handiwork, a man with a penis enlargement. | 11 |
| 8 August 2006 | S01E12 | Lucy reassures Dylan the police are on to the right suspect in their school counsellor's accident; The founder of Fat Camp International arrives to oversee the campers' final 'weigh-in'.; Henry accepts having missed out as host of Dancing with the Stars, saying that Daryl is skating on thin ice. | 12 |
| 15 August 2006 | S01E13 | Wedgedale Plaza's security guard Mike Small puts some new recruits through their paces.; Wedgies' drive-thru girl Karen instructs a new trainee, Deirdre, on her first day of her 'defining' career at Wedgies' drive-thru.; Cooking with Christopher Walken sees a chicken with popcorn shrimp dish being made.; The host of talk show "Don't Hang Yourself" tackles some emotional issues with his guest, resulting to his guest in tears.; On the conclusion of Fat Crackers, Mandi Maple-Brown reaches the final weigh-in.; Lucy informs Dylan her relationship with the school's new counsellor, Andrew, is strictly professional. | 13 |

=== Thanks For Coming ===
| Original Air Date | TV Broadcast | Synopsis | # |
|---|---|---|---|
| 22 August 2006 | S01E14 | Funk FX auditions are held at Karla Bang's School of Dance Xcellence, with Karla choosing Kiki as her lead act.; Sporting superstar Mark Warey apologises to Heath Ledger and the supporting cast of Brokeback Mountain and the gay community as a whole for insulting them.; The Chainsaw Guy meets the snipper and has his chainsaw string cut.; Keith and Tina promote their latest product, the Air Band 200.; Lucy turns her intentions to stalk Andrew, her counsellor. | 14 |
| 29 August 2006 | S01E15 | The chainsaw guy finds true love with a bandaged girl.; Zak's dad takes the family camping.; Lucy tells Andrew of her dreams while attempting to stalk him.; Art Cooney gives his students career advice. | 15 |
| 5 September 2006 | S01E16 | Sherine and Leanne get out to do some shopping for clothes.; Cooking with Harry Potter sees anything random being eaten such as tomatoes.; The Chainsaw Guy's has his first date.; Lola the psychotic lollipop lady takes a biter.; Lucy sends Andrew a message from his house.; Mark Warey's manager discusses his client's disappearance in India.; Marileise the South African dog trainer shows the best way to bribe a judge. | 16 |
| 12 September 2006 | S01E17 | Art Cooney meets with two same sex parents making disgusting references of homosexuality whilst talking.; Sandra Sultry gets an update on the approaching wildfires from hunk firefighter, Barry Buff.; Jack Farmer takes up painting with his 'f***ing flies'.; The amazing Shane makes a birthday performance, stealing all the presents and food.; Robbie Fowler is concerned that Kevin, his imaginary friend, is being ignored by his family. | 17 |
| 19 September 2006 | S01E18 | Art Cooney appears on Wedgedale Idle with a suggestive rap.; Cooking with Paris Hilton sees Paris' sexuality being tested.; Jack works with new farmhand Ennis, a supposedly gay farmer.; Lucy gives a statement to the police the threats made against her by her school counselor's wife.; Karla oversees the last days of rehearsal before the dance recital, settling on an Australiana theme. | 18 |
| 26 September 2006 | S01E19 | National Nightclubbing Championships from the very popular Demolitions Night Club; The Chainsaw Guy resorts to calling technical support for help on his new chainsaw but doesn't get much help from the Wedgetel Call Centre.; "Big" Mike Small auditions on Wedgedale Idle with a gutless performance which Mark Holden criticises.; Jack and Ennis spend some time in Jack's back paddock called 'Backdoor Mountain'.; Karla Bangs' Dance Spectacular has its premiere with Kiki's lead performance.; Lucy resumes her chat with Dylan claiming that she's really sorry for cheating on him.; Mark Warey announces his split from his manager at Spotfires lmtd. | 19 |

=== That's Valid ===
| Original Air Date | TV Broadcast | Synopsis | # |
|---|---|---|---|
| 3 October 2006 | S01E20 | Karen and the Wedgies staff have a drive-through emergency in the style of an aircraft emergency.; Jack shows Ennis the BrokeWedge mountain river and the two sleep in a tent together.; Lucy resumes her chat with Dylan but he's not speaking to her.; Karla Bang's dance spectacular has its big finale; Kiki gets injured. | 20 |
| 10 October 2006 | S01E21 | Mike Small shares his five symptoms of a cheating spouse with Rodger.; Lola is angry that an 'inconsiderate' parent has driven over the line at the children's crossing.; Principal Schmitt tries to have a few words with young William Bunt before getting rudely interrupted.; WEJ FM is taken off air by the mysterious Snipper.; Cooking with Russell Crowe see a meat dish being made.; Lucy tries to get Dylan to take her to the school formal.; Clare Douglas drops in on some clients before they go to bed. | 21 |
| 24 October 2006 | S01E022 | Wedgedale Idle continues with a performance from Wedgies' employee Karen.; Perpetual marathoner Robbie Fowler approaches Wedgedale and keeps his mind active in the strangest of ways.; The trolley boy fails as the snipper comes from nowhere and cuts the rope that was holding the trolleys together.; National Shopping Championships sees the fastest shoppers win the race.; A tearful Mark Warey announces his separation from his fiancée, Karen.; Lucy plays her new song "Slapper Slap Down" for Dylan. | 22 |
| 31 October 2006 | S01E23 | Arts & Crafts with Christopher Walken sees a spring hat being made.; Sherine and Leanne audition for Wedgedale Idle.; Zak's dad gets his wires crossed installing a new security system.; Lucy tells Dylan she has publicised their relationship.; Sandra Sultry's "Wedgeline" takes a look at kiddie band The Veggies.; Robbie Fowler encounters some hurdles on his marathon run. | 23 |
| 7 November 2006 | S01E24 | Keith and Tina's Home Direct offer their latest deal on the Intergalactic Defend-a-Probe 2000.; Sandra Sultry's "Wedgeline" continues with the Veggies.; Cooking with Pamela Anderson sees an Aging American Fruitcake being made.; At Café Wedge, Henry questions his girlfriend about her infidelity.; Karen suggests a vow of chastity to her employee and has a cautionary tale about Ronald. | 24 |
| 14 November 2006 | S01E25 | Cooking with the Olsen Twins sees nothing being made.; Mark Warey's lawyer addresses his client's pushing a sick kid and his mother into a magazine rack.; National Workplace Championships take place.; Speed dating with Christopher Walken sees him trying to impress a girl.; Lucy turns to Voodoo and introduces Dylan to her new celebrity boyfriend.; Art Cooney visits Karingal Park Secondary College to meet the winners of the "Art Cooney Comes to Your School" contest. | 25 |
| 21 November 2006 | S01E26 | Lucy makes it to Wedgedale Idle.; Jack shares his poetry with the locals at the pub.; Sandra Sultry searches desperately for a sign-off.; Mark Warey's apologises to his manager for a shooting accident.; Sandra Sultry announces The Veggies' breakup briefly after their tour ends.; Lucy gives Dylan another chance at their relationship as they are both free.; "Big" Mike Small checks out Wedgedale's hottest club (Demolitions).; Robbie Fowler finally reaches the finish line... and keeps going. | 26 |

== Season two ==
| Original Air Date | TV Broadcast | Synopsis | # |
|---|---|---|---|
| 12 August 2007 | S02E01 | The amount of pies eaten by a fat man is a good way for setting petrol prices.; Mark Warey clears the air in regard to allegations he had sex with a flight attendant .; Racing car is quickly fixed by the grid girls.; Make me look like Jennifer Aniston at a beauty store.; Catholics have a tuneful Kumbiya my lord song.; Mayor's acceptance speech is interrupted by Mark Warey.; Wedgedale Blue's Sergeant Spanky gets physical with a drug abuser.; Bono's world poverty summit experience is shared on an ad.; A night in the ER of the Wedgedale Private Hospital sees patients with something stuck up their buttocks.; Helpful Hailey asks whether her workmates want a peanut.; WedgeBank mock ad tell us how you could help you make them rich. | 1 |
| 12 August 2007 | S02E02 | Lucy chats about different types of males that are available.; Wedgedale's most embarrassing mum talks about how her son was conceived at her son's birthday party.; The Warey doll insults and seduces its victims.; Helpful Hailey helps her work mates with their cups of coffee.; Mark Warey retires from sport.; Sergeant Spanky and Constable Peakes attempt to arrest a robber.; Wedgedale's Private Hospital lets go of a patient.; Art Cooney hits on his colleague's fiancé. | 2 |
| 19 August 2007 | S02E03 | A man decides whether they should order their food separately or together.; An unlucky man tries to seduce a girl but end up seducing another.; Father Inappropriate makes inappropriate suggestions for a funeral.; Two ladies stuff themselves.; Mark Warey retires from sport.; Sandra Sultry warns the citizens of Wedgedale of a thief.; The Sexpot granny talks about 'true beauty' and gives him a task to seduce George.; A lady tries to get some sleep despite her husband's rude interruptions; Ernie Bird introduces his favourite trainee, Bryce.; Mike Small targets the water wasters of Wedgedale. | 3 |
| 19 August 2007 | S02E04 | Lucy answers 'partygirl's' question about what present to bring to guy's birthday party.; Wedgedale's most embarrassing mum talks about how her son was conceived at her son's birthday party.; Bono promises to do the Nutbush if Global Warming is made history.; Helpful Hailey asks her colleagues donate for a retiring colleague's present.; Police are now targeting signwriters in Wedgedale.; Mike Small targets water restrictions abusers.; Wedgedale's most embarrassing mum tries to be secretive about her daughter's tampons.; Father Inappropriate continues to give inappropriate suggestions about people's funerals.; A man discovers his male friend had had plastic surgery for breasts.; Wedge Travel helps some travellers with some inappropriate advice.; Measuring a man's body temperature is a good way for determining petrol prices. | 4 |
| 16 September 2007 | S02E05 | Mark Warey talks about his long lost illegitimate son.; A couple from Wedgedale receives difficulties in receiving a television signal.; A couple have a spelling emergency when playing 'I Spy' on the road.; Sherine and LeAnne attend anti-pokies meetings but are distracted by the fact that they were late to go to the pokies.; Wedgebank advertises their new credit card.; The Sexpot granny tries her luck out in the internet dating system and give people a vivid description of her 'choochy snorcher'.; Ernie Bird hires his homosexual nephew at the Hopping Mice.; The Tattoo Artist accidentally write a phone number on a client's back.; A man becomes a fridge in an operation of a different kind.; A man gets tricked into using roll-on deodorant.; The Grid Girls fix up a car engine while the racers are away.; Sergeant Spanky and Constable Peakes chase after a criminal but Sergeant Spanky is puffed.; Father Inappropriate counsels to homosexual men. | 5 |
| 20 October 2007 | S02E06 | Mike Small shoots down a water waster.; Embarrassing mum tries not to embarrass her son about his new girlfriend.; Photos are taken at church where a funeral is held, simply to upset everyone there.; Art manages to persuade a student to not be a film maker by telling him how he should make his first film; The annoying husband disrupts his wife during her sleep by making out with another woman.; Bono helps poverty in Africa and says that the money donated would be used to buy his albums.; Lucy discusses ways to cheat in a school test.; The tattoo artist makes the mistake of giving a pianist a hardcore tattoo.; A man freaks out when disputing with his friends over a crossword answer.; A toy shop manager answers n inquisitive girl's question about a doll house.; Police are targeting lame bumper stickers in Wedgedale.; Robert De Niro reads Little Red Riding Hood in a way that would give children nightmares.; Wedge Travel try to help two nuns who are on the way to Rome for an important meeting with inappropriate advice.; Helpful Hailey has a crush on colleague, so she sticks a picture of him on an empty water tank and begins kissing it.; Sandra Sultry suggests that there is a six-second delay on this episode of The Wedge.; Ernie Bird believes that he is one thirty-second Aboriginal, only to find out he is one thirty-second Indian. | 6 |
| 26 October 2007 | S02E07 | Ernie Bird recruits a girl into his footy team, much to the dismay of the boys.; Sherine and LeAnne bet their kids in a pokie game.; Mark Wary returns from his holiday with an unwanted tattoo.; Lucky reveals his embarrassing gossip on an unsuspecting person.; Wedgedale Blue sees Sergeant Spanky and Constable Peaks in a spot of trouble.; Noel has his wheelchair stuck in a toilet, however he won't accept any help. | 7 |
| 2 November 2007 | S02E08 | The Snipper helps out a penis operation by cutting it off.; The Wedgedale South football club swaps one of their supporters for a more passionate supporter from a rival team supported.; Two dates meet at a restaurant from an online dating service with the woman checking the man's bad habits; The Grid Girls try to calm the racer's sad mood.; Wedgedale's worst Tattoo Artist doesn't leave enough space for his client's full name to be spelt out.; Lucy discusses the ways to skip PE class.; The daft worker makes a daft conversation while a couple is making out.; Wedge Air advertises their inedible meals as world class.; Sergeant Spanky dies in the finale of 'Wedgedale Blue', but is discovered not dead after he is buried.; Father Inappropriate runs the funeral of a man but cannot keep a straight face during the mass.; Wedgedale's most embarrassing Mum discovers that his son has been reading pornographic magazines.; The Wedgedale Private Hospital plays jokes on one of their colleagues.; A woman asks for her wedding present barbecue back since her friends' divorce.; Sandra Sultry tries to seduce Bono by stripping for him.; The Annoying Husband recites Today Tonight's headlines during his sleep, much to the concern of his wife.; A woman asks for help for her husband's bronchitis on the road's emergency telephone. | 8 |
| 9 November 2007 | S02E09 | The Pokie Girls have a fit when they don't have enough money to put into the pokies machines.; Wedgedale Cellars advertise their new products that are revolting.; A crazy couple performs a mime melodrama in front of some construction workers.; Mike Small, now back to a security guard at Wedgedale Plaza, tells Oric his old nicknames for his penis.; Helpful Hailey tells her colleagues to sign her crush and colleague's birthday card and places a photoshopped image of him on it.; Ernie Bird ends up in WPH while his wife becomes the coach and wins the important match for the Hopping Mice.; An unlucky bogan parks exactly between the No Parking zone.; Christopher Walken advertises a piece of sporting equipment called the Abdo Slimmer.; Lucky reveals his embarrassing gossip about his mates in front of their faces.; Father Inappropriate becomes annoyed when he is baptizing a child that won't stop crying. | 9 |
| 17 November 2007 | S02E10 | Bono complains that he doesn't have anything else to advertise because he had already said what he wanted to say.; The annoying employee makes a daft conversation whilst a guy is being electrified.; A friend of the dead's funeral makes an inappropriate speech.; Lucy advertises and insults emos by advertising a new washing powder called 'Emo', a la Omo.; Wedgebank advertises their best in modern technology, the oldest computers and technology.; The car satellite tells a man that his wife doesn't want to have sex with him anymore because his penis is too small.; Robert De Niro gives his own version on 'Aladdin'.; The unlucky guy trying to find a date says how many times he has had sex, much to the disgust of the girls.; A doctor examines the dead body of a man whilst insulting his body and looks.; Ernie takes his older player's retirement too seriously.; The Annoying Husband reveals to his wife that he is only sleeping with her for sex.; Mark Wary faces the press about his affair with another girl and tries to escape using a scooter.; Constable Roland tests a woman for alcohol consumption.; The Sexpot Granny rings her lover for some 'action in the bedroom'.; The Tattoo Artist inadvertently put the wrong tattoo on his client. | 10 |
| 17 November 2007 | S02E11 | Mark Wary faces court and a press conference after his case about his affair.; Two ladies try to feel sorry for a wife's husband's death, however they are too busy eating.; A strange and very personal survey takes place at Wedgedale Plaza.; A man accidentally recognizes the wrong Will Smith.; A gypsy cheats and makes a fake and strange prophecy for money.; Noel has his presentation in front of a cheering crowd.; WPH's doctors has a fun after each patient's surgery is over.; Wedge Travel assists a sick boy and his mum to go to Disneyland.; Sandra Sultry reads her new headlines in alliteration.; The Embarrassing mum misunderstands her daughter and thinks that she will lose her virginity.; The Yeti Hunter misses the yeti by a spit second.; The spruiker tries to advertise her products. | 11 |
| 24 November 2007 | S02E12 | The grid girls talk about politics before getting rudely interrupted by a pillow fight.; Cliché couple parody a French pornographic film whilst ordering a meal.; Father Inappropriate steals the donation money from his church to go to a paid toilet.; The Pokie Girls are asked to 'trust your partner' when Sherine receives a phone call.; Wedge Air combat carbon emissions with new environmentally friendly features on their planes.; The tattoo artist is asked to tattoo the most evil and grueling thing on earth, John Howard.; The dancing couple performs their dance routine 'The Cycle of Life' in front of the old people in a nursing home.; Mark Wary mishaps in court and is driven away by police.; The police force are interrupted by a phone call from a telemarketer during a serious situation.; The Bogan goes to the car wash to wash himself.; Ernie bird is sacked with his wife in his place; he is reinstated because he can't manage the teams washing.; The unlucky dater tries to seduce two girls by saying he cool with bisexuals and gays, the girls misunderstand and gives him two guys 'to play with'.; Wedgedale Hardware advertises their new product, the baby clamp.; 'Late at Night with Sandra Sultry' sees her interviewing the deranged school girl, 'Lucy'.; Mike Small explains to Oric who or what is bigger than Anthony Callea. | 12 |
| 30 November 2007 | S02E13 | A personal survey about sex takes place at Wedgedale Plaza.; The embarrassing mum teaches her kids and their friends about the facts of life.; Bono advertises fair trade before complaining about the African who cleans his toilet.; Mark in rehabilitation, devises a plan to escape, a la Prisonbreak.; Ernie Bird fakes his resignation after the footy committee can't guarantee his job. The hopping mice get into the grand final, Ernie is sacked and his wife leaves him for his boss.; The yeti hunter is once again ignorant after just missing 'Big toe'.; Constable Roland almost suffocates his client when testing for alcohol.; Aaron says a few irreverent words for his friend Nigel at his funeral.; The satellite dish decides to part from its owner in a confrontation.; The Sexpot Granny tries to break up Dr. Branson from his girlfriend through the phone.; Christopher Walken advertises the 'Juicinator'.; WPH tries to save a man's television and get it to receive every channel instead of just Channel Seven. | 13 |
| 2 December 2007 | S02E14 | No Information | 14 |
| 7 December 2007 | S02E15 | Robert De Niro gives his own spin on 'Hansel and Gretel'.; Art Cooney becomes atheist when he teaches Religious Education.; The tattoo artist accidentally tattoos on a homosexual comment, 'I love Mark' instead of 'I love Mary' on his male client's body.; A couple first meets even though they've been living there for years.; The yeti hunter, still ignorant, discovers 'Big Toe's' footprint.; Mark Warey comes out of rehabilitation successfully and with good results. However, before that, the rehabilitation center's manager has to do a body check for alcohol on Mark and a support circle takes place.; Another sexually explicit survey takes place at Wedgedale Plaza.; The 4WD mums are worried about how one of the mum's children will cope after the death of her husband.; Brian turns into a werewolf after a customer offers him a mint shaped like the moon.; The Sexpot Granny scares the pizza boy and he faints. Whilst he is fainted, she takes the chance to rape him.; The Bogan tries to seduce a sports car in the presence of its owner.; Ivanka gives a girl a message from her mother on the other side; the girl complains that her mother is still alive.; A man whilst praying is pranked by a television show, 'Duped', after he thinks that God is giving him a sign to do the hokey pokey. | 15¹ |
| 14 December 2007 | S02E16 | A couple of policemen play knots and crosses on a people's car wheels.; A superstitious women spies on her neighbours to see if they are breaking the law whilst her sons go and rob their neighbours.; Sandra Sultry Spa Series see Sandra Sultry interviewing Mark Warey and Jerry sensually.; Mike Small gives his nicknames for his 'man boobs' to an unwary customer at Wedgedale Plaza.; Karl Largerfreak gives his expert opinion on several fashion subjects.; Wedgedale Hardware advertises a map of their hardware to help you get out of it.; The Sexpot Granny, whilst waiting for the bus, scares off an unwary man.; Good Morning Sunshine with Shane and Roach sees a phony Muscle Stimulator being advertised and bad traffic report being made.; A taxi driver lets a thief trick him on his birthday.; A Wedgedale advertisement sees Sherine and Leanne promote the pokie machines and the department of community housing centers.; ”So You Think You Can Dance Wedgedale?” sees Kiki being paired up with a German and her instructor Karla Bangs. The theme for the week is Broadway.; A man accidentally recognizes another man as Stephen Hawking.; A man from the Human Right League complains about people not trying their best.; The dancing couple angers the prisoners who escape whilst chasing them. | 16 |
| 15 December 2007 | S02E17 | Wedgedale Mutual hires Jacque after she proves that she can annoy her customers.; A woman comes to pick up her son, Ben, from a caravan library, only to discover the library is the size of a public library.; Christopher Walken is supposedly abducted by aliens but is discovered later at a parent/teacher interview.; Lucy becomes obsessed with horses and presents the ways to get a horse from your parents on LandOfLucy.; Brian discusses being a monster before turning into a werewolf.; A parking officer accidentally places his U2 concert ticket on the car of woman instead of a ticket when issuing a ticket.; Father Inappropriate uses the donation money from mass on a Chocolate Factory machine.; Jack Gets Alienated has a visit from Bob from the bank who is actually an alienated.; Bono tells of his sponsor child who owes him a debt.; Sandra Sultry defends a video that was circulated a few days ago and never intended to be broadcast.; Max the personal trainer trains and discusses his ninja techniques.; The 4WD mums confuses the barman who is listening to the conversation.; Art Cooney wants to put his knowledge of EQ and his student's knowledge of IQ to form the perfect man.; Wedge Air advertises their own spin of the Frequent Flyer Campaign.; A girl attempts to get a date by calling through the emergency phone on the freeway. | 17 |
| 21 December 2007 | S02E18 | The yeti hunter stays in search of the Wedgedale yeti, Bigtoe.; A loving couple visits the wife's father much to the dismay of the husband.; A word game quickly turns into a personal and sexually explicit conversation.; The annoying husband wakes up in a woman's dress.; A very personal survey takes place at Wedgedale Plaza.; Jack Gets Alienated sees Jacks buttocks being probed.; The dancing couple gives their own interpretation of the miracle of child birth.; A group shares some jokes before a man makes everything awkward.; Jeanne, the superstitious lady manages to be racist to her friendly neighbours.; Mike Small explains to Oric what strange objects he has eaten before including a meerkat family.; Sandra Sultry flirts endlessly with the garbage man being interviewed on Wedge News.; The Really Good Three devises an unsuccessful plan with the Mystery of the Green Lawn before being interrupted by a really good plan from a fat girl.; Wedgedale Warehouse advertises their Wolfe Creek DVDs. | 18 |
| 22 December 2007 | S02E19 | Episode Confirmed | 19 |
| 23 December 2007 | S02E20 | Leanne has a bad dream about the Chainsaw guy cutting off her fingers, making her unable to play pokies ever again.; Wedgedale Hardware advertises their dental surgery services.; Mark Warey's documentary delves deeper into the sexual life of him.; Robert De Niro reads his own version of the Three Little Pigs.; Brian has a Halloween encounter with a torch, making him become a werewolf.; Jack receives first class service from Bob from the bank.; A racist survey takes place at Wedgedale Plaza.; Constable Roland makes a daft conversation with his client who almost suffocates again.; The dancing couple performs for the Australian troops in Iraq.; A lawyer complains about the cricket results when his client in jail.; Father Inappropriate 'thanks the lord' that one of his sisters is sick.; Sister Marie's 'Duped' sees a priest being pranked on by using a whoopee cushion.; Lucky gives his gossip at the wrong time, this time to his illegitimate brother. | 20 |
| 28 December 2007 | S02E21 | Episode Confirmed | 21 |
| 29 December 2007 | S02E22 | Episode Confirmed | 22 |

¹This episode featured a cameo appearance from past cast members, Julia Zemiro and Marney McQueen.
