= Mark Loves Sharon =

- Created by: Jason Gann
- Starring: Jason Gann; Dailan Evans; Abby Meates
- Country of origin: Australia
- Original language: English
- No. of episodes: 6

Production
- Running time: 30 minutes

Original release
- Network: Network Ten
- Release: 30 June – 4 August 2008

Mark Loves Sharon was a six-part Australian television mockumentary parody series about sport, celebrities and reality television.

The series sees Jason Gann reprising his role of Mark Wary from The Wedge, a professional Sports star, that is a parody of controversial real-life sport stars Shane Warne and Wayne Carey. Dailan Evans also reprises his role as his long-suffering manager Jerry.

The theme song of the show is Little by Little by Chasing Bailey.

== Cast ==
- Jason Gann as Mark Wary
- Dailan Evans as Jerry Dabelstein
- Abby Meates as Sharon Metcalf
- Shaun-Angus Hall as Sledge
- Timothy O'Dwyer as Tomo
- Kylie Gulliver as Chrystal
- Saskia Hampele as Beth
- Shane Connor as Roy Ward (2 episodes)
- Mark L Hann as CZL a.k.a. Casual
- Martin Copping as Chip (1 episode)
