= The Extra (2005 film) =

- DVD cover
- Directed by: Kevin Carlin
- Written by: Kevin Carlin; Jimeoin; Tony McDonald; Dan Rosen
- Produced by: Stephen Luby; Bruno Charlesworth; Mark Ruse
- Starring: Jimeoin; Katherine Slattery; Rhys Muldoon; Bob Franklin; Colin Lane; Shaun Micallef
- Production companies: Macquarie Film Corporation; Ruby Productions
- Distributed by: HuaXia Film Distribution Company (China)
- Release dates: 2005; (Australia); 2007 (China)
- Running time: 96 minutes
- Country: Australia
- Language: English

The Extra is a 2005 Australian film starring Irish comedian Jimeoin and based on the twice AACTA nominated & Tropfest awarded 1999 Tooting Bec produced short film The Extra, starring Peter Phelps, Julia Zemiro.

At the ARIA Music Awards of 2005 the soundtrack was nominated for Best Original Soundtrack, Cast or Show Album.

== Plot ==
Jimeoin, in the title role, plays a man obsessed with becoming famous. He is passionate about being a celebrity, but unfortunately he just isn't very talented. After trying to secure roles in myriad productions he finally finds employment as an extra, and what follows is his misadventures as he becomes involved with shady business men, producers and mobsters, all of whom are fixated with show business.

== Cast ==
- Jimeoin as The Extra
- Katherine Slattery
- Rhys Muldoon as Curtis Thai-Buckworth
- Bob Franklin
- Colin Lane as Danny
- Shaun Micallef as Paul Ridley
- Tony Nikolakopoulos as Tony (bouncer)
- Helen Dallimore as Kylie Crackenrack
- Michael Veitch as Doctor
- Sam Healy as Door Bitch
- Damien Fotiou as 2nd AD

== Production ==
Original Production of the 2005 feature film was delayed due to a successful plagiarism claim between the earlier short films’ producer regarding the storyline, its origins and title. An out of court settlement was reached after the feature film’s producer, Bruno Charlesworth admitted to the short film’s claims but unsuccessfully tried to impose a gag order on the short film’s win.

Jimeoin says he was interested in writing the film because he wanted to explore the nature of fame. He admitted that In 1999, he had had multiple meetings with producers and the short film’s director about plans to co-develop the original The Extra into a feature film.

He says it took five years to write the script

I work on them really slowly. I do a lot of stand-up, so time's at a minimum, and then, after two years I looked at it and thought it was the wrong thing I wanted to do - so I started again, and got it done within a year and a half after that. I then noticed I had two stories mixed into one, so I had to pick one story over the other - that's probably why it took five years, I had to realise that... I wanted the second film to have a broader appeal, then I could get more money to make it - so it would be a better looking picture. It's not a film about films - there's not a lot of film jokes in it. I'm really hoping people discover it.

Jimeon was involved in the casting progress.

Katherine Slattery, I hadn't met before, and I remember she came to the audition process and just nailed it. Everyone else [in the film] I knew pretty well, but I still had them audition for it. That's the only way you know whether they're going to work as their characters. I actually removed things from the script after the audition - because they didn't work.

It was the first movie shot at Melbourne's Docklands Studios.

== Reaction ==
=== Box office ===
The Extra grossed $749,113 at the box office in Australia.

=== Overseas Release ===
While this film was considered a box office flop in Australia, in 2007 it became the first Australian film to receive a general release in the People's Republic of China since Crocodile Dundee. The film was picked up by a Chinese distributor following a series of film festivals organised in the country by the Department of Foreign Affairs and Trade in 2006. The Chinese distributor contacted the producers and brokered the deal.

"People in China are attracted to the dream of fame and celebrity like everyone else The Extra treats the aspiration in a way Chinese audiences will respond to", said a spokesman for the distributor. "It is a cleverly structured film with some wonderful performances and a lovely balance of drama and humour".

"When you put a lot of work into something and it doesn't do very well it can be disheartening," said Jimeoin. "There are some many films in the world and when you release an Australian film you're up against all of them. The Extra is a simple film and it was released with no fuss, we paid for that but it shows every cloud has a silver lining".

== See also ==
- Cinema of Australia
