= Dailan Evans =

Dailan Evans is an Australian health professional with a background in the performing arts. He is the founder of the Melbourne Cough Clinic and practices as a speech pathologist specialising in laryngeal and upper airway disorders, working alongside several Ear, Nose and Throat Surgeons and Respiratory Physicians across Melbourne. Dailan holds a Master's degree in Speech Pathology from La Trobe University, as well as a bachelor's degree in Linguistics from the University of Melbourne. He is a certified practising member of Speech Pathology Australia and a member of both the Australian Voice Association and The Laryngology Society of Australasia.

== Early life and career ==
While studying at the University of Melbourne, Evans became involved with its theatre, and here met his long-term writing partner Craig Eagle. An interim period when he worked as an art director followed, but the two would go on to create and co-produce their own television series, Eagle & Evans, which was broadcast in 2004 on the ABC. Evans has since appeared in many television, film and stage productions with writing and performing credits. He is best known for his character acting in shows such as the ABC sitcom, Lowdown, as well as Network Ten's The Wedge, and Mark Loves Sharon. He has also made an appearance in the second season of Thank God You're Here.

Evans has lent his distinctive voice to various artistic and commercial ventures as a proficient voice actor. He has toured on several occasions with Orchestra Victoria, narrating Prokofiev's Peter and the Wolf, and the Brothers Grimm's The Brave Little Tailor.

== Acting filmography ==
- Offspring (TV series, 2013), Photographer
- Cliffy (Film 2013), Joe Record
- Lowdown (TV Series 1&2, 2010–2012), Dr James Sores
- Attack! (Film 2011), Priest
- The Not So Great Eugene Green (Film 2009), Lab worker
- Mark Loves Sharon (TV series 2008), Jerry Dabelstein
- Bogan Pride (TV series, 2008), Bank Manager
- The Wedge (TV series 1&2, 2006–2007), Various Characters
- Thank God You're Here (TV Series 2, 2006), Film Critic
- 50 Years of Comic Relief (TV 2006), Jerry Dabelstein
- Eagle & Evans (TV series, 2004), Various Characters
