= Julie Eckersley =

Australian actress, comedian, writer and producer

Julie Eckersley is an Australian actress, comedian, writer, producer and former Head of Scripted at SBS Australia and is the Director of Screen Content for Screen Queensland.

== Career ==
=== Screen ===
Eckersley has appeared in comedy televisions shows including Let Loose Live, The Wedge, Newstopia and Rebel Wilson's comedy series, Bogan Pride, the drama City Homicide and Blue Heelers, children's series Dead Gorgeous, crime series Carla Cametti PD and TV movie Little Oberon.

=== Stage ===
Eckersley performed in Harvest Rain Theatre's production of Much Ado About Nothing in 1999.

Alongside Trevor Stuart, she appeared on stage in the Secret Death of Salvador Dali. In March 2004, their performance at Griffin Theatre and Strut & Fret Production House, SBW Stables was reviewed by Bryce Hallett for the Sydney Morning Herald.

In 2008 Eckersley performed in the one woman show Bombshells for the Melbourne Theatre Company.

She has performed nationally and internationally for companies including Bell Shakespeare, Riverside London, QTC, MTC, La Boite, Grin and Tonic, B Sharp and Griffin Theatre Company.

=== Producer ===
In addition to acting, Eckersley has written for episodes of The Wedge and Let Loose Live.

Eckersley is a producer at Matchbox Pictures where she has produced a range of shows in different genres including documentary, comedy, animation and drama. She was the producer for the award-winning series Nowhere Boys, Zuzu & the Supernuffs and The Real Housewives of Melbourne. In 2021 Eckersley was named as the Head of Scripted content at SBS (Australian TV channel). In 2024, Eckersley departed from her role at SBS.

On 21 October 2025, Screen Queensland announced Eckersley was appointed to the role of Executive Director of Screen Content.

== Awards and nominations ==
Eckersley produced Nowhere Boys, which won the 2015 Kidscreen Award for Best New Tweens/Teens Series.

Eckersley is a three-time nominee by the AACTA Award for Best Film (The Turning), Best Television Comedy Series (The Family Law), and Best Television Drama Series (Glitch) in 2014, 2016, 2017.

She has been awarded a 4MBS award and a Matilda Award in 2000 for her performance as Rosalind in Shakespeare's As You Like It and for her performance in The Secret Death of Salvador Dali.

== Filmography ==
=== As actor ===
Year	Title	Role	Notes
2016–19	The Family Law	Waitress / Customer 1 / Bratwurst Woman	TV series, 3 episodes
2015	Maximum Choppage	Counsellor	TV series, 1 episode Also producer
2013	Winners & Losers	Principal Chisholm	TV series, 1 episode
2013	Paper Giants: Magazine Wars	Woman on Park Bench	TV series, 1 episode
2012	10 Terrorists	Grayville-Smith	Feature film
2010	Dead Gorgeous	Agatha Heggleby	TV series, 13 episodes
2009	Carla Cametti PD	Georgina Kavel	TV series, 6 episodes
2009	Satisfaction	Deborah	TV series, 1 episode
2008	Bogan Pride	Maths Olympiad Announcer	TV series, 1 episode
2007–08	Newstopia	Various characters	TV series, 30 episodes
2006–07	The Wedge	Various characters	TV series, 48 episodes Also writer
2006–07	City Homicide	Rita Solomon	TV series, 2 episodes
2005	Paper Thin		Short film
2005	Blue Heelers	Kylie Larkin	TV series, 1 episode
2005	Little Oberon	Poppy	TV movie
2005	Let Loose Live	Various characters	TV series, 2 episodes Also writer
2004	Holly's Grail		Short film
2003	Traces	Christine Smart	Short film
2003	Razor Eaters	Jenny	Feature film
2001	Cybergirl	Julia	TV series, 1 episode
1996	Fire	Reporter	TV series, episode: "War of the Worlds III"

=== As crew ===
Year	Title	Role	Notes
2023	Australian Epic	Producer	TV series, 6 episodes
2023	Erotic Stories	Executive Producer / Head of Scripted	TV series
2023	Safe Home: The Women of Safe Home	Producer	Short film
2023	Safe Home: The Story Behind the Series	Producer	Short film
2023	While the Men Are Away	Head of Scripted	TV series; 8 episodes
2023	Safe Home	Executive Producer / Head of Scripted	TV series, 4 episodes
2022	Barrumbi Kids	Head of Scripted	TV series; 10 episodes
2022	Latecomers	Head of Scripted	TV series; 6 episodes
2022	True Colours (Australian TV series)	Head of Scripted	TV series; 4 episodes
2017	Oddlands	Executive Producer	TV movie
2016–19	The Family Law	Producer	TV series, 18 episodes
2015–19	Glitch	Producer / Associate Producer	TV series, 18 episodes
2015	Maximum Choppage	Producer	TV series, 6 episodes
2014	The Real Housewives of Melbourne	Associate Producer	TV series, 10 episodes
2013–14	Nowhere Boys	Transmedia Producer	TV series, 13 episodes
2013	Zuzu & the Supernuffs	Producer	TV series, 8 episodes
2013	The Turning	Producer	Film anthology series, segment: "Cockleshell"
2013	Anatomy	Producer	TV series, 3 episodes
2006	The Wedge	Writer	TV series, 48 episodes
2005	Let Loose Live	Writer	TV series, 2 episodes

== Theatre ==
Year	Title	Role	Venue / Company
2009	Realism		Southbank Theatre, Melbourne
2008	Gala		Southbank Theatre, Melbourne
2008	The Window		The Bakehouse Theatre, Adelaide
2006	Festen	Mette	Fairfax Studio, Melbourne
2005	Cyrano de Bergerac	Bourgeois Woman / Lisa / Sister Claire	Playhouse, Melbourne
2004	The Conquest of the South Pole		The Store Room, Melbourne
2004	Terrorism		Fortyfivedownstairs, Melbourne
2003–4	The Secret Death of Salvador Dali		The Butter Factory Theatre Wodonga, Star Court Theatre Lismore, Stables Theatre, Sydney, Roundhouse Theatre
2003	Closer		The Store Room, Melbourne
2003	Cosi	Lucy / Julie	Playhouse, South Bank
2002	Bearhunt		Chunky Move Studios, Melbourne
2002	Four Small Deaths		Chapel Off Chapel, Melbourne
2001	Crave		Belvoir Street Theatre
2001	The Tempest	Miranda	Playhouse, Melbourne with MTC
2000	A Midsummer Night's Dream	Hermia	Sydney Opera House, Playhouse Canberra, His Majesty's Theatre, Perth, Melbourne Athenaeum, Theatre Royal, Hobart, Princess Theatre, Launceston, Gold Coast Arts Centre, Geelong Performing Arts Centre with Bell Shakespeare
2000	As You Like It	Rosalind	
1997	The Idiot		Harvest Rain Theatre, Brisbane
1996	The Hope of the World		Cremorne Theatre, Brisbane
1996	The King and the Corpse		City Botanic Gardens, Brisbane for Brisbane Festival
1996	1347		Botanic Gardens Theatre, Darwin
1996	Godspell		Queensland
1995	Cymbeline		Van Gogh's Ear Lobe, Brisbane
1994	Shadowlands		Harvest Rain Theatre, Brisbane
1993	Private Lives		La Boite Theatre, Brisbane
