= The Late Report =

1999 Australian news satire TV show

- Genre: Variety-talk show
- Presented by: Richard Stubbs; John Safran; Michael Veitch; Marg Downey; Tony Wilson; Emma Tom
- Country of origin: Australia
- Original language: English

Production
- Running time: 30 minutes, 60 minutes

Original release
- Network: Seven Network
- Release: February 1999 – April 1999

The Late Report was a short-lived news satire show on Australia's Seven Network during 1999. The show originally ran at 10:30 pm on Tuesdays, preceded by spoof news-broadcast show The Big News, and featured interviews, trivia segments, and comedic takes on pop culture and current events.

The show had a rotating group of hosts, led by Richard Stubbs and also featuring John Safran, Michael Veitch, Marg Downey, Tony Wilson, and Emma Tom. While originally signed for a 14-week season, it ultimately ran for only 10 weeks.

== Background ==
The Late Report aired during a precarious time for Seven Network; as the channel's ratings dropped, the show was pitched as an attempt to draw a younger audience to the channel. Tony Wilson described its format as "Simon Townsend's Wonder World for adults".

== Notable segments ==
In one segment, John Safran attempted to make cricketer Shane Warne break his no-smoking contract with a nicotine patch company by sending a remote-controlled, cigarette-carrying seagull onto the Melbourne Cricket Ground during a match, a gimmick that got Safran sent to court. In another segment, Safran dressed up as Ronald McDonald as a prank, visited a McDonald's location, and got frisked by police after the restaurant's management allegedly made a false report that Safran had been robbing the store. The Seven Network refused to broadcast this segment, although it eventually aired on Channel 4's Disinformation in the United Kingdom.

== Reception and cancellation ==
The Late Report was embattled from the beginning. The Big News was considered a failure, and a writer for the Sydney Morning Herald described The Late Report airing afterward as "a move akin to handcuffing [the show] to a slaughtered goat and throwing it into shark-infested waters." The Late Report received poor reviews, especially early in its run; according to Tony Wilson, some viewers thought the rotating-presenters format broke up its flow.

Executives at the Seven Network were wary of the show's harsh satire, particularly at the expense of the Liberal Party. Some of the executives commented that the show "skated rather too close to the line of acceptable satire" and that it felt like "a Labor Party propaganda show". A rumour spread that the office of John Howard, the Australian prime minister and leader of the Liberal Party at the time, contacted the show and complained about the way the Howard Government was portrayed in it; the Seven Network's representatives denied the rumour.

When The Big News was cancelled, the two shows were combined to fill the entire hour. The move, a response to poor ratings, did not work, and the Seven Network cancelled The Late Report on 9 April 1999, citing poor commercial performance. The network would not run a similar show until 2003's The Chat Room.
