= Michael Veitch =

Australian comedian

- Born: 29 November 1962 (age 63); Melbourne, Victoria, Australia
- Occupations: Writer; actor; broadcaster
- Years active: 1985−present

Michael Veitch (born 29 November 1962) is an Australian author, actor and broadcaster, best known for his roles on the sketch comedy television shows The D-Generation, Fast Forward and Full Frontal, as well as for his books on World War II aviation, marine science and travel.

== Life and career ==
=== Television ===
Veitch attended Melbourne Grammar School and the University of Melbourne (where he completed an arts degree) where he participated in Melbourne University Revues. After one performance, producers from the ABC in 1985 commissioned The D-Generation, a half-hour weekly sketch comedy series. It was followed by a second season in 1987. Veitch performed a variety of characters over both seasons of the show, and went on to write and perform in the sketch comedy shows Fast Forward and Full Frontal on the Seven Network between 1989 and 1995.

As one of the lead performers, Veitch became known for impersonations and characterisations of current film and TV personalities such as Sonny (Skippy parody), Clive Robertson and Clive James as well as creating original characters, such as Wayne the airline steward which he created and performed alongside Steve Vizard.

In 2005, Veitch made a short-lived return to sketch comedy in Let Loose Live. Prior to the show's debut, Veitch had said in an interview with the Melbourne Age that

"I think that there is a hunger for comedy. We need something to hold the mirror up and look at the familiar in a different way. So much of the world is presented to us as a kind of impervious block of information, and what satire does is say well, actually, no, you don't have to look at everything the way that society wants you to look at it."

From 2006 to 2009, Veitch presented ABC Television's flagship arts magazine program, Sunday Arts; this was one of the roles which he had performed in parody a decade before on Fast Forward.

In 2012, Veitch starred in the award-winning short film Best Kept Secret, a mockumentary spoof on tourist promotion, filmed in Tasmania and directed by David Pyefinch.

Veitch joined the ensemble cast of the sketch comedy series Open Slather which began airing on Foxtel's The Comedy Channel in May 2015.

=== Books ===
Veitch has written eleven books on the topics of history, military history, travel and Australia's role in the Pacific War. He has also pursued a lifelong interest in the aviation of the Second World War, the subject of his first three books. Flak – True stories from the men who flew in World War II published in 2006 by Pan Macmillan and later, Fly: True stories of courage and adventure from the airmen of World War II published by Penguin Australia in August 2008.

A third book, The Forgotten Islands, exploring the lesser-known islands of Bass Strait, was published by Penguin Australia in August 2011. In 2015, Veitch wrote Southern Surveyor, a book about the CSIRO's Marine National Facility's research vessel.

Also in 2015, Veitch produced a third volume of Second World War airman stories, Heroes of the Skies, published by Penguin Books. In July 2016, he released 44 Days – 75 Squadron and the Fight for Australia through Hachette Australia. This work explores the six-week period in early 1942 when a single squadron of RAAF airmen defended Port Moresby against the ascendant Japanese. His seventh book, detailing the ordeal of an Australian airmen fighting with the French Resistance in 1944, was released by Hachette in late 2017.

=== Radio ===
In 2010, Veitch moved to Hobart, Tasmania, to host afternoons on 936 ABC Hobart local ABC radio. At the beginning of 2012, he began hosting the evening program across Tasmania. Later that year, he left ABC local radio to commence working with a theatre production, with his final broadcast occurring on 20 September 2012.

=== Theatre ===
In 2003, Veitch played one of the lead roles in the Australian production of the musical The Full Monty, based on the 1997 film. In 2004, he starred in the musical comedy It's a Dad Thing which toured nationally.

In 2009, Veitch played the lead role of Molly Meldrum in the Melbourne musical comedy Countdown, a tribute to the iconic Countdown TV show of the 1970s and '80s. Veitch was praised for his performance, one reviewer remarking (of the show's return in 2011), "renowned Australian actor Michael Veitch brings the role of Molly Meldrum to life – his portrayal is nothing short of outstanding. One would be forgiven for thinking that Meldrum himself was back on stage. Veitch's imitation skills are flawless and his comic timing is second to none."

In 2014 and 2015, Veitch toured Australia in Flak – True stories from the men who flew in World War Two, a one-man stage version of his aviation books, in which he performs, in character, several of the men whose war stories he uncovered in his books Flak and Fly.

== Personal life ==
Veitch has a daughter who edited the student magazine Farrago, and two sons. In 2020, he was admitted into the RAAF as a Special Reservist officer, joining the History and Heritage Branch as a Community Liaison Officer with the rank of Squadron Leader.

== Filmography ==
=== Film ===
Year	Title	Role	Type
1984	The Bark is Worse than the Byte		Short film
1992	Garbo	Town Clerk	Feature film
1993	A Royal Commission Into the Australian Economy	Alan Bond / Prime Minister Paul Keating	TV movie
1993	The Making of Nothing	Morris Burke	TV movie
1994	Lucky Break (aka Paperbook Romance)	Det Sgt Scott	Feature film
1996	Brilliant Lies	Paul Connor	Feature film
1996	Turning April	Additional voice	Feature film
2000	The Magic Pudding	Fergus the Bandicoot (voice)	Animated feature film
2002	The Real Thing	Commercial Director	Feature film
2003	Take Away	Barry Burgie in Burgies TV Commercial (uncredited / voice)	Feature film
2005	The Extra	Doctor	Feature film
2005	The Adventures of Roman Pilgrim	Guardian of the Threshold	Short film
2005	Ten Feet Tall	Doug	Short film
2012	Best Kept Secret		Short film
2017	The Fox	Timekeeper	Short film

=== Television ===
Year	Title	Role	Type
1986–87	The D-Generation	Sonny / Clive Robertson / Clive James / Wayne the airline steward	TV series, 16 episodes
1988–89	The D-Generation Goes Commercial	Various characters	TV specials, 4 episodes
1989	Space Knights	Blunderblock	Puppetry TV series
1989–92	Fast Forward	Kelvin Cunnington / Redmond Herring / various characters	TV sketch series, 90 episodes
1992	Bligh	Governor William Bligh	TV series, 13 episodes
1993	Stark	TV Presenter	TV miniseries
1993–94	Full Frontal	Various characters/ Announcements	TV sketch series, 20 episodes
1995	Halifax f.p.	Doctor Baker	TV series, 1 episode
1995	Jimeoin	Various characters	TV sketch series, 10 episodes
1996	Mercury	Rocco Kostas	TV series, 2 episodes
1996	In Melbourne Tonight	Various characters (including Fergie)	TV variety series
1996; 2003	Blue Heelers	John Garris / Det Sgt Daryl Darcy	TV series, 2 episodes
1997	Eric	Various characters	TV sketch series, 9 episodes
1997	Ocean Girl	First Officer Danton	TV series, 10 episodes
1997	Get a Life	Trevor Bayliss	TV series
1998	Driven Crazy	Mr Bellows	TV series, 1 episode
1997–98	Li'l Elvis and the Truckstoppers	Duncan (voice)	Animated TV series, 26 episodes
1999	Chuck Finn	Franke Tingalla	TV series, 1 episode
1999	The Late Report	Various characters	TV sketch series
2000	Something in the Air	Ralph Dewey	TV series, 3 episodes
2000; 2003	Pizza	Nerd / John Pokonjak	TV comedy series, 2 episodes
2001–02	Shock Jock	Jack Piper	TV series, 26 episodes
2002	McLeod's Daughters	Lenny Bradshaw	TV series. 2 episodes
2003	Comedy Inc		TV series
2004	Stingers	Donny Swan	TV series, 1 episode
2005	Let Loose Live	Various characters	TV series, 2 episodes
2005–09	Sunday Arts	Presenter	TV series
2006–11	Dogstar	Mark Clark (voice)	Animated TV series, 52 episodes
2010	City Homicide	Scott Meyers	TV series, 1 episode
2011	Dogstar: Christmas in Space	Mark Clark (voice)	Animated TV movie
2014	Black Comedy	Guest cast	TV series, 1 episode
2015	Open Slather	Various characters	TV series, 20 episodes

== Theatre ==
Year	Title	Role	Location
1981	The Cherry Orchard	Pyetya Trofimov	University of Melbourne, The Mill Theatre, Newtown, College Church Hall, Parkville
1981	Saved	Harry	University of Melbourne with The Previous Theatre Company
1984	Ivanov		Anthill Theatre, Melbourne with Australian Nouveau Theatre
1985	Too Cool for Sandals		University of Melbourne, The Last Laugh, Collingwood
1986	Macbeth		Warehouse, South Melbourne with Australian Nouveau Theatre
1991	A Royal Commission into the Australian Economy		Universal Theatre for Melbourne International Comedy Festival
1993	The Dutch Courtesan	Master Mulligrub	Russell Street Theatre with Melbourne Theatre Company
1993	Much Ado About Nothing	Borachio	Playhouse, Melbourne, Theatre Royal, Hobart, Princess Theatre, Launceston with Melbourne Theatre Company
1994	Loot		Mietta’s, Melbourne (also director)
1994	Red Nose Comedy Night		Festival Theatre, Adelaide
1994	See How They Run		Mietta’s, Melbourne
2002	All Het Up		Czech House, Melbourne for Melbourne Fringe Festival
2003	The Full Monty	Harold Nichols	State Theatre, Melbourne & Australian national tour
2004	It's a Dad Thing		Australian national tour
2009; 2011	Countdown	Molly Meldrum	Melbourne production
2011	The Sound of Music	Herr Zeller	Hobart with Exit Left Productions
2014–15	Flak – True stories from the men who flew in World War Two	One man show - various characters	Australian national tour
2018	Opening Gala Concert	MC / Compere	Opera Pavilion, Olinda for Yarra Valley Opera Festival
2018	The Handmaid’s Tale	Professor Pieixoto	Opera Pavilion, Olinda for Yarra Valley Opera Festival
2019	A Very Very Very Short History of Opera	MC / Narrator	Memorial Hall, Healesville for The Opera Studio

== Bibliography ==
- Veitch, Michael (2008) [2006]. Flak. Sydney, New South Wales: Pan Macmillan Australia. ISBN 978-0-330-42408-0. OCLC 224762224.
- —— (2009) [2008]. Fly. Camberwell, Victoria: Penguin. ISBN 978-0-14-301194-1. OCLC 301793193.
- —— (2011). The Forgotten Islands. Camberwell, Victoria: Penguin Group Australia. ISBN 978-0-67-007181-4.
- —— (2015). Heroes of the Skies. Melbourne, Victoria: Penguin Group Australia. ISBN 978-0-67-007825-7.
- —— (2015). Southern Surveyor. Clayton South, Victoria: CSIRO Publishing. ISBN 978-1-48-630264-2.
- —— (2016). 44 Days. Sydney, NSW: Hachette Australia. ISBN 978-0-73-363363-8.
- —— (2017). Barney Greatrex : From bomber command to the French Resistance : the stirring story of an Australian hero. Alex Lloyd and Angus Hordern (researchers). Hachette Australia. ISBN 978-0-7336-3723-0.
- —— (2018). Hell Ship – The true story of the plague ship Ticonderoga, one of the most calamitous voyages in Australian history. Allen & Unwin. ISBN 978-1-76063-084-3., also presented as a one-person play
- —— (2019). Turning Point – The Battle for Milne Bay 1942, Japan's first Land Defeat in World War II. Hachette Australia. ISBN 978-0-7336-4055-1.
- —— (2021). The Battle of the Bismarck Sea. Hachette Australia. ISBN 978-0-7336-4589-1.
- —— (2025). Borneo: The Last Campaign. Hachette Australia. ISBN 978-0-7336-4853-3.
