= Jason Gann =

Australian actor, comedian, writer and producer

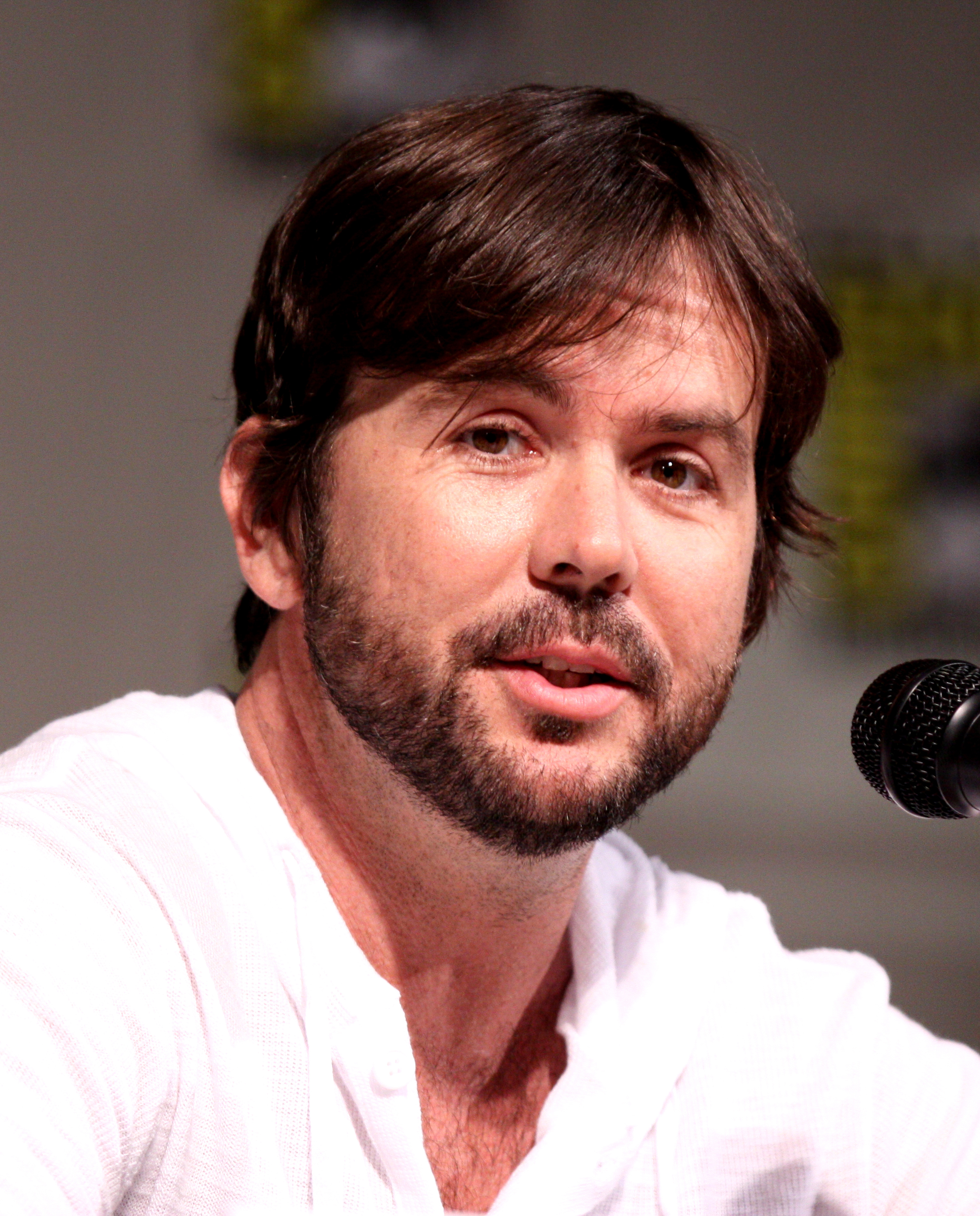
- Gann at San Diego Comic-Con in July 2011
- Born: Jason Gann; Toowoomba, Queensland, Australia
- Occupations: Actor, writer, producer, comedian, musician, entrepreneur
- Years active: 1997–2014
- Children: 2

Jason Gann is an Australian-born former actor, comedian, writer and producer. He is best known for his role as the title character in the Australian comedy series Wilfred, directed by Tony Rogers, and the American reboot of the same name. His spouse is Alejandra Varela.

== Biography ==
=== Early life ===
Jason Gann was born in Toowoomba, Queensland, Australia. At 14, while attending an all-boys school, Gann discovered his love for comedy when he performed as Suzanne, leader of the can-can dancers in a high school production of Paint Your Wagon. After high school, he went on to study acting at the University of Southern Queensland. He earned a B.A. in Acting while also attending classes in humanities and the arts.

=== Early career ===
Immediately following his studies, Gann moved to Brisbane, where he continued studying theatre and music. He worked in children's theatre at the Twelfth Night Theatre in Bowen Hills for several years, performing in dozens of shows. He also played lead roles and toured the country in several comedy theatre productions for that theatre company. He developed and starred in several seasons of the Arts Council-funded play Keep Everything You Love, for which he won the Del Arte Award for Best Male Actor 1997. Gann then worked for the Queensland Theatre Company as an actor in several development projects and starred in the Sven Swenson play The Vertigo and the Virginia for QTC in 1999.

=== Wilfred and Australian TV ===
In 2001, Gann wrote and produced several short films that screened in festivals internationally. In 2002 he co-wrote and starred in the short Wilfred. He first came to national attention when he won Best Male Actor and the short won Best Comedy and the Peoples' Choice Award at Tropfest in 2002. Wilfred went on to screen at festivals including Sundance Film Festival in 2003.

Gann won the Tropfest Best Male Actor award again in 2003 for Buried. He then appeared in Australian feature films including Gettin' Square, Thunderstruck, The Illustrated Family Doctor, and Kenny.

In 2004, for Australian TV, Gann appeared in two episodes of Blue Heelers and had a cameo on Kath & Kim. In 2006, Gann wrote and starred in 52 episodes of the sketch comedy show The Wedge on Australia's Network Ten. Gann then created, produced, wrote and starred in the network's spin-off comedy series Mark Loves Sharon. The following year, Gann co-created and played the title character for the Australian comedy series Wilfred, based on the short film. It ran for two seasons, both of which went on to win awards at Tropfest in 2007 and 2009.

=== American television ===
In 2010, Renegade Films sold the Australian format of Wilfred to the American network FX. Faced with redeveloping the show for an American market without Tony Rogers, Gann teamed with Family Guy executive producer David Zuckerman. Actor Elijah Wood signed on to co-star with Gann. The Wilfred debut became FX's highest-rated comedy series debut.

Gann is managed by Jeff Kwatinetz at Prospect Park. Gann left ICM and signed with WME in 2012. After Wilfred, Gann has been commissioned to produce and develop new television series by networks including ABC.

=== Business career ===
As of 2014, Gann has left both acting and writing to pursue his CBD business Wilfred CBD & Hemp.

== Awards and nominations ==
In 2007 and 2010, Gann was nominated for an AFI Award for Best Male Performance in a Comedy Series. In 2007 he won for Best Comedy Series, for Wilfred, and in 2010 he won for Best Screenplay in a Television Series. In 2011, Gann was nominated for a Silver Logie for Most Outstanding Actor for his work on Wilfred. He was awarded the Australian GQ Comedian of the Year Award for 2011, and was nominated for the annual Golden Collar Award, normally given solely to canine performers.

== Personal life ==
=== Melbourne legal incident ===
In 2007, Gann pleaded guilty to assaulting a shuttle bus driver, Joseph Hosny. Gann's legal counsel advised him to plead guilty rather than fight the allegation, as a tough sentence could have threatened the production of Wilfred in the United States. In September 2014, Gann was reassessing his legal options. In March 2018, a California court ordered Gann to pay $594,452 (USD) to the bus driver.

== Filmography ==
=== Film ===
Year	Title	Role	Notes
2002	Wilfred	Wilfred	Short film, Writer
2003	Ain't Got No Jazz	Intruder	
2003	Button It	Jogger (Squealer A.C)	
2003	Gettin' Square	Wood-Duck Frank	Feature film
2004	Thunderstruck	Robbo	Feature film
2005	The Illustrated Family Doctor	Carl Lucas	Feature film
2006	Kenny	Buggy victim's friend	Feature film
2007	Rats and Cats		Feature film, writer

=== Television ===
Year	Title	Role	Notes
2006–07	The Wedge	Various characters	TV series, writer
2007–10	Wilfred	Wilfred	Australian TV series, co-creator, writer
2008	Mark Loves Sharon	Mark Wary	TV series, co-creator, writer, executive producer
2008	Jason and the Residents	Jason	
2008	Comedy Gold	Himself	TV series
2008	9am with David & Kim	Himself / Mark Wary	TV series, 1 episode
2009	The Squiz		TV series, 2 episodes
2011–2014	Wilfred	Wilfred	American TV series, creator, writer

=== Theatre ===
Year	Title	Role	Notes
2007	'Allo 'Allo!	Herr Otto Flick	Twelfth Night Theatre

== See also ==
- List of celebrities who own cannabis businesses
