= The Wedge (Australian TV series) =

- Season two logo
- Created by: Ian McFayden
- Developed by: Cornerbox Productions
- Starring: Dailan Evans; Rebel Wilson; Cal Wilson; Jason Gann; Adam Zwar
- Opening theme: Sounds Funny sung by Hunter Kaine
- Ending theme: Sounds Funny Instrumental
- Composer: Musicbox
- Country of origin: Australia
- Original language: English
- No. of seasons: 2
- No. of episodes: 48 (4 unaired) (list of episodes)

Production
- Executive producers: Steve Dundon & Andy McIntyre
- Producer: Michael Horrocks
- Production location: South Melbourne
- Running time: Approx. 22 minutes

Original release
- Network: Network Ten
- Release: 30 May 2006 – 29 December 2007

Related
- Mark Loves Sharon (Spin-off)

The Wedge is an Australian sketch show created by Ian McFadyen and produced by Cornerbox for Network Ten. The show stars Dailan Evans, from the ABC sketch show Eagle & Evans; Adam Zwar, best known for his roles in Wilfred, Rebel Wilson, who at the time was best known as 'Toula' on the comedy show Pizza; Jason Gann, two-time winner of best actor at Tropfest for his roles in Wilfred, as well as regulars Kate Jenkinson, Anthony Ahern, Katrina Mathers, Julie Eckersley and Ross Daniels. Marney McQueen, Aidan Fennessy and Cori Hooper were also regulars in Series 1, and Damian Callinan and Cal Wilson were regulars in Series 2.

It ran for two seasons, airing 2006 and 2007. A spin-off mockumentary of one of the show's characters, Mark Wary, was produced by Network Ten in 2008. The show, titled Mark Loves Sharon premiered at 9:30pm on 30 June 2008.

== History and premise ==
The program was first advertised by Network Ten in December 2005, with promos depicting Wedgedale, a stereotypical Australian urban sprawl suburb. The show’s pilot debuted on Network Ten on 30 May 2006. It is a sketch based format similar to Fast Forward or The Comedy Company. The difference is that nearly all the sketches take place in the same town, so the transition from sketch to sketch often involves a reference to the previous one. Most transitions involve a timelapse shot that takes the audience from one location to another, but sometimes the reference is more direct and seamless. This is used so often, that a sketch based on it was made. In one episode, the character, Sandra Sultry said "Next up, I'll turn my head to the TV behind me; it's a clever transitional device which will put you through to the next item..."The first season finale was broadcast on 21 November 2006. "Sounds Funny" is the show's theme. Hunter Kaine was recommended as the singer by a production team member's friend.

A second series was commissioned by Network Ten; production began in September, and was filmed in South Melbourne. The second season's status was updated by a news bulletin posted on its official website, which was advertising for a live taping with an audience. The second season was broadcast on Network Ten in 2007.

The second season was first hinted on Network Ten in 2007 promoting a Mother Energy drink, featuring the character, Sandra Sultry (played by Katrina Mathers) and unknown voice actor as a frog. Along the bottom of the screen scrolled a web address for the Mother energy drink.

The official website was relaunched with new information on the second series on 10 August.

The second season began on 12 August 2007, with two episodes screened back to back with the new rating of 'M' at 9:40 PM. However, from 19 August onwards, the timeslot was inconsistent from week to week. The season took a break for almost a month and was continued at the later time of 10.25 PM on 16 September with a single episode airing. It was dropped from the timeslot was once again due to the Rugby World Cup. Despite such movements from Network Ten, the show retained a much more popular feedback than its first season and has been having consistent ratings of around 500,000 viewers per episode. On 26 October the show returned with a 10:30 PM timeslot, and was not renewed for a third season.

== Cast and crew ==
=== Season 1 ===
Cast

Cast	Role	Occupation
Dailan Evans	Various Characters	Actor/Comedian/Writer
Rebel Wilson	Various Characters	Actor/Comedian/Writer
Jason Gann	Various Characters	Actor/Writer
Julie Eckersley	Various Characters	Actor/Writer
Anthony Ahern	Various Characters	Actor
Katrina Mathers	Various Characters	Actor
Kate Jenkinson	Various Characters	Actor
Adam Zwar	Various Characters	Actor/Writer
Marney McQueen	Various Characters	Actor
Aidan Fennessy	Various Characters	Actor
Cori Hopper	Various Characters	Actor
Julia Zemiro	Various Characters	Actor/Comedian
Brandon John	Various Characters	Actor
Frieda McKenna	Various Characters	Actor
Ross Daniels	Various Characters	Actor/ Comedian
Hunter Kaine	Theme Song/Music Clip	Singer/Songwriter

Crew

Crew	Job
Steve Dundon	Executive Producer
Michael Horrocks	Series Producer
Steve Vizard	Creative Consultant
Ross Daniels	Supervising Producer
Nick Bufalo	Director
Graeme Rowland	Director
Ian McFadyen	Co-Executive Producer/Writer/Creator
Andy McIntyre	Co-Executive Producer
Brendan Luno	Writer
Tal Brott	Writer
Paul Calleja	Writer
Catherine Deveney	Writer
Des Dowling	Writer
Craig Eagle	Writer
Russell Gilbert	Writer
Andrew Maj	Writer

=== Season 2 ===
Cast

Cast	Role	Occupation
Dailan Evans	Various Characters	Actor/Comedian/Writer
Rebel Wilson	Various Characters	Actor/Comedian/Writer
Jason Gann	Various Characters	Actor/Writer
Julie Eckersley	Various Characters	Actor/Writer
Anthony Ahern	Various Characters	Actor/Writer
Katrina Mathers	Various Characters	Actor/Writer
Kate Jenkinson	Various Characters	Actor/Writer
Adam Zwar	Various Characters	Actor/Writer
Damian Callinan	Various Characters	Actor/Comedian/Writer
Cal Wilson	Various Characters	Actor/Comedian/Writer
Ross Daniels	Various Characters	Actor/ Comedian/ Writer/ Supervising Producer
Hunter Kaine	Introductory Song/Music Clip	Singer/Songwriter

Crew

Crew	Job
Michael Horrocks	Series Producer
Daniel Scharf	Series Producer
Andrew Power	Assistant Director
Steve Vizard	Creative Consultant
Daniel Scharf	Producer
Kevin Carlin	Director
Ian McFadyen	Co-Executive Producer/Writer/Creator
Nicole Minchin	Line Producer
Andy McIntyre	Executive Producer
Tal Brott	Writer
Michael Chamberlain	Writer
Paul Calleja	Writer
Des Dowling	Writer
Craig Eagle	Writer
Russell Gilbert	Writer
Jo Gill	Writer
Greta Harrison	Writer
David Lawrence	Writer
Andrew Maj	Writer
Garry Macaffrie	Writer
Ray Matson	Writer
Gerard McCulloch	Writer
Lulu McClatchy	Writer
Anita Punton	Writer
Matthew Vaughan	Writer
Vin Hedger	Writers Coordinator
Matt Cameron	Writer

== DVD releases ==
DVD title	Release date	No. of episodes	Running length	Rating
We're Moving	9 October 2006	6	134 minutes	M
Lucky	9 October 2006	7	156 minutes	M
Thanks for Coming	20 November 2006	7¹	156 minutes	M
That's Valid	16 December 2006	7	156 minutes	M

- ¹The 20th episode of season one was repeated in the That's Valid and Thanks for Coming DVDs.

== Critical reception ==
The Wedge had mixed success with audiences and critics during its first season. The ratings for the first season were initially strong, with the first episode receiving 1.5 million viewers and later episodes averaging over one million viewers. The shows recent popularity waned nearer the end of the first season, with episodes reaching a much smaller audience (681,000 viewers for the episode that aired on 21 November 2006). Despite the show's first season initially receiving high ratings, it was criticised by some TV reviewers. Issue was taken with the perceived over-use of canned laughter and what they considered to be poorly written, dated, cheap humour that attacked easy targets and propagated offensive stereotypes. Shortly after the series debuted, Catherine Deveny, one of the writers, wrote an article for The Age in which she revealed that the producers had insisted on re-writing and blanding out the scripts in the hope of appealing to a wider audience, but maintained that the writers and performers were themselves talented comics.

Although the show had its share of negative reviews, critics from Famous magazine quoted that it had "Some of the most outrageous, loopy, and colourful residents God ever put on this world", while Sean Fewster from the Adelaide Advertiser remarked that "This could well be the first truly great ensemble of the 21st Century" and "The Wedge is a near perfect blending of The Comedy Company's family-friendly, occasionally bizarre jokes and Fast Forward's nasty, satirical edge.... Ladies and gentlemen, welcome back to Australian sketch comedy". Sean Lynch remarked that "We may very well look back on this...as the beginning of one of Australia's greatest comedy shows of the new millennium", Neil Mitchell from 3AW remarked that the show was "one of the freshest things on TV" and a writer from newspaper The Age said "Such a rich vein of comedy, you can't help wonder why someone hasn't mined it sooner". Memorable TV remarked "At last we have a comedy sketch show worthy of the mantle of Fast Forward and Full Frontal. Very funny." shortly after the release of the DVDs. The show's second season had a much more popular feedback from audiences during its second season, hence reflecting from its consistent ratings at its 'dead-zone' timeslot. The Age, who had panned the show's previous season remarked, "... (The Wedge) delivers enough flashes of brilliance to confirm it's on the right track".

British television and radio presenter Jonathan Ross recently reviewed it on his film 2009 show, in which he condemned it saying "it tries to hard to follow the much better British alternatives and fails badly" in which he added "not one to watch".

== Side projects ==
- Karingal Park Secondary College won a competition called "Art Cooney Comes to Your School" that was first advertised on The Wedge website. As a part of the prize, the school received a visit from Adam Zwar, portraying the character Art Cooney. Another competition to get on set of 'The Wedge' was set, winners were invited onto the set for a tour.
- The Wedge characters Mark Wary (Jason Gann) and his manager (Dailan Evans) made an appearance on the 50 Years of Comic Relief show broadcast on Seven Network. In addition to this, Russell Gilbert, Kate Jenkinson and Rebel Wilson also made an appearance on the show.
- Cal Wilson, Dailan Evans and Kate Jenkinson have made an appearance on Australia's improvisation show, Thank God You're Here during its second season. Rebel Wilson has also made appearances on the third season of Thank God You're Here (as well as Kate Jenkinson's second appearance).
