= Ross Daniels =

Australian actor

Ross Daniels is an Australian actor and comedian.

== Career ==
Daniels has guest starred in various Australian TV dramas including City Homicide, Stingers, Blue Heelers, Something in the Air and Janus. He played alongside Bud Tingwell in the award-winning episode of the children's show Round the Twist titled The Tears of Innocence. In feature films he played Dave in The Hard Word (2002) and Ferret in Guru Wayne (2002).

In the 1990s he was a high-profile standup comic, frequently headlining at iconic Melbourne venue The Last Laugh and The Comedy Store, Sydney. During this same period Daniels was a regular guest on television shows such as Tonight Live with Steve Vizard as well as resident comedian on Midday with Ray Ray Martin.

He co-created and co-hosted Home and Hosed with Shane Bourne for The Comedy Channel in 1999. The series was a unique variety/sketch show filmed entirely at Daniels' home.

He has performed in several Melbourne International Comedy Festival shows including Control Freaks, The Scared Weird Little Guys 30 Minute Variety Hour, Cops on Heat 1&2 and The Linda Blair Witch Project. Although Daniels’ standup comedy appearances are rare, he is a notable comic improviser and was an original, core cast member of the musical stage show Spontaneous Broadway for over ten years.

He returned to solo performing, including the one-person show The Transposed Man, which was nominated for Best Comedy at Adelaide Fringe 2011.
