= The D-Generation =

Australian sketch comedy show (1986–1987)

- Starring: (personnel listed in article)
- Country of origin: Australia
- No. of episodes: 16 (ABC episodes); 4 (Channel 7 specials)

Production
- Running time: 33 minutes ea.

Original release
- Network: ABC TV; Seven Network
- Release: 13 March 1986 – 12 October 1989

The D-Generation is an Australian sketch comedy series produced and broadcast by ABC for two series in 1986 and 1987. A further four specials were broadcast on the Seven Network between 1988 and 1989. The show would also serve as a stepping stone for many early incarnations of characters, including Lynne Postlethwaite, Gina Hard-Faced Bitch, Eileen Maverick and Kelvin Cunnington. The cast would eventually split off, those who stayed at the ABC to create The Late Show (and eventually Working Dog Productions,) and the others leaving to perform on Fast Forward for the Seven Network.

== Synopsis ==
The series was produced and directed by Kris Noble and was created and written by a group of Melbourne University students: Rob Sitch, Santo Cilauro, Marg Downey, Michael Veitch, Magda Szubanski, John Harrison, and Tom Gleisner. Since 1983, they had performed in revues and radio shows.

Also part of the original team was Nicholas Bufalo, who appeared in the unscreened one-hour D-Generation pilot (1985), before accepting a role on the soap A Country Practice. Several of Bufalo's sketches from the pilot (including the Thunderbirds parody) were incorporated into series one, and Bufalo himself returned for the specials. Actress/comedian Jane Turner and New Zealander Tony Martin joined from series two, and Melbourne Uni Revue stars Mick Molloy and Jason Stephens were added for the specials.

- Nicholas Bufalo (1985, 1988–89)
- John Harrison (1985–89)
- Magda Szubanski (1985–89)
- Marg Downey (1985–89)
- Michael Veitch (1985–89)
- Rob Sitch (1985–93)
- Santo Cilauro (1985–93)
- Tom Gleisner (1985–93)
- Sue Yardley (1987–89)
- Jane Turner (1987–89)
- Tony Martin (1987–93)
- Jane Kennedy (1988–93)
- Jason Stephens (1988–93)
- Mick Molloy (1988–93)
- Judith Lucy (1991–93)

== Episodes ==
=== Series one (1986) ===
No.	Title	Original release date
1	"Australia"	13 March 1986
2	"Religion"	20 March 1986
3	"The Media"	27 March 1986
4	"Leisure"	3 April 1986
5	"Work"	10 April 1986
6	"Politics"	17 April 1986
7	"The Arts"	24 April 1986
8	"Science"	1 May 1986
9	"Relationships"	8 May 1986
10	"Comedy"	15 May 1986

=== Series two (1987) ===
No.	Title	Original release date
11	"Nightmare on D Generation Street"	30 April 1987
12	"Hercules, Saviour of the D Generation"	7 May 1987
13	"Deep Generation"	14 May 1987
14	"D Generation, Bloody D Generation"	21 May 1987
15	"The Easy Listening Sounds of the D Generation"	28 May 1987
16	"That's D Generation!"	4 June 1987

=== Highlights series ===
No.	Title	Original release date
1	"The Least Worst of the D-Generation"	11 June 1987
2	"The Least Worst of the D-Generation"	18 June 1987
3	"The Least Worst of the D-Generation"	25 June 1987
4	"The Least Worst of the D-Generation"	2 July 1987

=== Channel 7 specials ===
No.	Title	Original release date
1	"The D-Generation Goes Commercial"	23 May 1988
2	"Degenocide"	11 October 1988
3	"The D-Generation Salute to Roy Smeck"	1 November 1988
4	"D-Generation Country Homestead"	12 October 1989

== Video and DVD releases ==
Two "best of" videos were released: The Best of the Original D-Generation was released on ABC-video in 1996 and featured selected highlights from the two ABC series. A second video was released in 1997 called Degenocide: The Second Best of the Original D-Generation which featured additional material from the ABC series along with highlights from the Channel 7 specials including the highly popular Homicide spoofs. The latter video also featured bonus material including footage filmed on Super 8 by the group whilst at University, clips from the Channel-9 pilots, both of the Five-in-a-Row music videos, home-video footage of their 1991 stage show at Le Joke and clips from when the D-Generation were guest hosts on Countdown and Burke's Backyard.

In 2004, both of the above videos were re-released on a single DVD The Best and Second Best of the D-Generation.

== Radio serial ==
The D Generation breakfast show is a radio program which ran for six years, from 19 May 1986 to April 1992, on Melbourne's Triple M (originally EON FM). Highlights of the show were released on albums.

== Discography ==
=== Studio albums ===
List of studio albums with Australian chart positions
Title	Album details	Peak chart positions
Title	Album details	AUS
Thanks for Being You	Released: 1987; Label: ABC Records (L-25042); Format: LP, Cassette	-
The Satanic Sketches	Released: December 1989; Label: Mushroom Records (L-30223); Format: LP, Cassette, CD	50
The Breakfast Tapes (1988-90)	Released: September 1990; Label: ABC Records (L-30421); Format: LP, CD	47

=== Singles ===
Year	Title	Peak positions	Certification	Album
Year	Title	AUS	Certification	Album
1987	"Degeneration"	-		Thanks for Being You!!
1989	"Five in a Row"	12	ARIA: Gold	The Satanic Sketches
1990	"Five More in a Row"	37		The Breakfast Tapes (1988-90)

== Awards ==
=== ARIA Music Awards ===
The ARIA Music Awards is an annual awards ceremony that recognises excellence, innovation, and achievement across all genres of Australian music. The D-Generation won one award from two nominations.

Year	Nominee / work	Award	Result
1990	The Satanic Sketches	Best Comedy Release	Won
1991	The Breakfast Tapes (1988-90)	Best Comedy Release	Nominated

=== Breakfast show lineup ===
- Rob Sitch (19 May 1986 / Jan. 1989-Dec. 1991)
- Tom Gleisner (19 May 1986-April 1992)
- Santo Cilauro (19 May 1986-April 1992)
- Tony Martin (June 1987-December 1991)
- Michael Veitch (October 1987-April 1989)
- Marg Downey (June 1988–April 1989)
- Magda Szubanski (June 1988–April 1989)
- Jane Kennedy (June 1988-April 1992)
- Mick Molloy (January 1990-April 1992)
- Jason Stephens (January 1990-April 1992)
- Judith Lucy (April 1991-April 1992)
- John Harrison (September–December 1991)

== Post D-Generation ==
Cast members of both the television and radio show (Sitch, Gleisner, Martin, Cilauro, Molloy, Stephens and Jane Kennedy) subsequently moved on to the series The Late Show which ran for two years (1992–1993), with stand-up comic Judith Lucy joining the cast for the second series.

Four D-Generation cast members (Veitch, Downey, Szubanski and Turner) went on to a similarly styled sketch comedy series, Fast Forward (1989–1992) on Channel 7. All later made guest appearances on this show's sequel, Full Frontal (1993–1997), which marked the television debut of actor and comic Eric Bana.

Fast Forward itself led to the Channel 7 comedy shows, Big Girl's Blouse (1994), starring Magda Szubanski, Jane Turner and Gina Riley, and Something Stupid (1998), with the same trio, in addition of Marg Downey. Both series featured the parodic Aussie suburban characters who were later the 'stars' of the series Kath & Kim (2002-2007).

Szubanski, Riley, Turner, Downey and Veitch would reunite once more as part of the cast of sketch comedy series Open Slather (2015) on Foxtel's The Comedy Channel.

=== Rob, Santo and Tom ===
Three of the original D-Generation cast – Rob Sitch, Santo Cilauro and Tom Gleisner, along with Jane Kennedy and long time D-Gen producer Michael Hirsh are the principals of the Australian production company Working Dog Productions.

TV:

- Frontline (1994–1997)
- Funky Squad (1995)
- The Campaign (1996) (Documentary)
- A River Somewhere (1997–1998)
- The Panel (1998–2004)
- All Aussie Adventures (2001–2004)
- Thank God You're Here (2006–2009, 2023-2024)
- The Hollowmen (2008)
- Utopia (2014-)

Radio serials:

- Funky Squad (1994)
- Medico Point (1995)
- Implausible Rescue (1996)
- Johnny Swank (1996)

Film:

- The Castle (1997)
- The Dish (2000)
- Any Questions for Ben? (2012)

Books:

- Molvanîa: A Land Untouched by Modern Dentistry (2003)
- Phaic Tăn: Sunstroke on a Shoestring (2004)
- San Sombrèro: A Land of Carnivals, Cocktails and Coups (2006)

=== Tony and Mick ===
Tony Martin and Mick Molloy have remained an on-again/off-again team producing many film, radio and television features. Their most well known project 'Martin/Molloy', had a run of four years and released three ARIA Award-winning compilation albums – The Brown Album (1995), Poop Chute (1996) and Eat Your Peas (1998).

In mid-2007, the duo had a falling out following a dispute over the production of the DVD for the film Boytown and have not worked together since.

TV:

- The Mick Molloy Show (1999)
- Any Given Sunday (2006) (Molloy)
- The Nation (2007) (Molloy)
- Before the Game (2007-2013) (Molloy)
- The Jesters (2009, 2011) (Molloy)
- A Quiet Word With.... (2010-2011) (Martin)
- The Joy of Sets (2011) (Martin)

Radio:

- Bulltwang (Sept.-Dec. 1991)
- Martin/Molloy (1995–1998)
- Tough Love (2004–2006)
- Get This (with Tony Martin) (2006–2007)
- The Lonely Hearts Club (with Tony Martin) (Feb-April 2011)
- The Hot Breakfast (with Mick Molloy) (2011-2017)

Film:

- Tackle Happy (2000)
- Crackerjack (2002)
- Bad Eggs (2003)
- BoyTown (2006)

Books:

- Lolly Scramble (by Tony Martin) (2005)
- A Nest of Occasionals (by Tony Martin) (2009)
- Scarcely Relevant (by Tony Martin) (ebook-2012)
- Deadly Kerfuffle (by Tony Martin) (2017)

=== Other cast members ===
Michael Veitch and Marg Downey returned to sketch comedy in Let Loose Live (2005), but the show was axed after only two episodes due to poor ratings.

Veitch starred in the short-lived Channel 7 period sitcom Bligh (1992) and was a cast-regular in the TV-1 comedy series Shock Jock (2001-2002) and more recently on the Comedy Channel's Open Slather (2015). He also served as the host of ABC-TV's Sunday Arts, worked as an announcer on ABC radio, has authored six books (four of them on Second World War aviation) and has made successful forays into theatre including starring as Molly Meldrum in the Countdown tribute musical I Can't Believe its not Countdown.

Downey has appeared in a number of film and TV productions, in both comedic and dramatic roles, including the 1994 television movie Economy Class, the 2000 sitcom Sit Down, Shut Up, a recurring role in Kath & Kim and appearances in the 2006 US series Nightmares & Dreamscapes and the 2012 movie Kath & Kimderella.

Nick Bufalo has gone on to be a television director who has made several videos and specials with Australian children's band The Wiggles.

Jason Stephens is now the director of development for Fremantlemedia Australia, one of Australia's independent television production companies. He produced The King, a television movie based on the life of Graham Kennedy, and is the executive producer of Newstopia (2007–08) with Shaun Micallef. Stephens was also the creator of The Choir of Hard Knocks.

John Harrison left the group at the end of 1991 and virtually 'retired' from comedy, embarking on a career in the corporate sector. However, he made several guest appearances on The Late Show (1992-1993) and had a brief cameo as a newsreader on Tony Martin's 2003 film Bad Eggs.

Judith Lucy has had a career in stand-up comedy and has also worked in radio, appeared in the films Crackerjack and Bad Eggs and starred in two ABC-TV series Judith Lucy's Spiritual Journey and Judith Lucy is All Woman.
