= The Late Show (1992 TV series) =

- The Late Show intertitle
- Also known as: Late Show
- Genre: Comedy/Satire
- Written by: Santo Cilauro; Tom Gleisner; Jane Kennedy; Judith Lucy; Tony Martin; Mick Molloy; Rob Sitch; Jason Stephens
- Directed by: Joe Murray; Martin Coombes; Santo Cilauro; Mick Molloy; Tom Gleisner; Rob Sitch; Jane Kennedy; Tony Martin; Jason Stephens; Annie Maver; Ade Djajamihardja; Shelley Austin
- Presented by: Santo Cilauro; Tom Gleisner; Jane Kennedy; Judith Lucy; Tony Martin; Mick Molloy; Rob Sitch; Jason Stephens
- Starring: Santo Cilauro; Tom Gleisner; Jane Kennedy; Judith Lucy; Tony Martin; Mick Molloy; Rob Sitch; Jason Stephens
- Voices of: Tony Martin (as Bargearse in Bargearse, Governor Frontbottom and Judge Mutton chops in The Olden Days); Rob Sitch (Detective Glen Twenty in Bargearse, Hatstrap in The Olden Days); Judith Lucy (as Ann Bourke/Other Voices in Bargearse); Santo Cilauro (as Poloneck/Other Voices in Bargearse, Various Yokels in The Olden Days); Mick Molloy (as Chromedome in Bargearse, Sergeant Olden in The Olden Days); Jane Kennedy (as Natalie Thigh-Blaster in Bargearse, Caroline Chisholm in The Olden Days); Tom Gleisner (as Badnews in The Olden Days)
- Narrated by: Tony Martin (Various segments)
- Theme music composer: Craig Harnath
- Composers: Craig Harnath; Martin Lubran
- Country of origin: Australia
- Original language: English
- No. of seasons: 2
- No. of episodes: 40

Production
- Producers: Mark Gibson; Michael Hirsch
- Production locations: ABC Ripponlea Studios (Elsternwick, Melbourne; Victoria Australia)
- Cinematography: Santo Cilauro; Robin Plunkett; Roger McAlpine
- Editors: Tony Martin; Wayne Marx; John Tabbagh; Santo Cilauro
- Camera setup: Multi-camera
- Running time: 60 minutes
- Production companies: ABC; D.Generation Productions

Original release
- Network: ABC
- Release: 18 July 1992 – 30 October 1993

Related
- The D-Generation; Frontline; Funky Squad; All Aussie Adventures; Thank God You're Here; The Hollowmen; Santo, Sam and Ed's Cup Fever!; Santo, Sam and Ed's Sports Fever!; Santo, Sam and Ed's Total Football; Utopia; Pacific Heat

The Late Show's theme music
Sample of James Brown's "Turn Me Loose I'm Dr. Feelgood" from the album "Gravity" (1986)

The Late Show is a popular Australian comedy sketch and satire show, which ran for two seasons on the ABC. It aired weekly on Saturday nights from 18 July 1992 to 30 October 1993.

== Cast ==
The Late Show has its roots in the 1980s comedy group, The D-Generation. Consisting mostly of Melbourne University students, The D-Generation managed to gain a cult following with their radio and TV appearances.

After the breakup of the original The D-Generation, some of the members went on to perform on the commercial TV programme Fast Forward. The remaining members filmed several pilots for what was to be called The Late Late Show (no relation to the American show) at Channel Nine. These were rejected, and so the group accepted the ABC's offer of a one-hour timeslot on Saturday night. The cast members were:

- Santo Cilauro
- Tom Gleisner
- Jane Kennedy
- Judith Lucy (season two only)
- Tony Martin
- Mick Molloy
- Rob Sitch
- Jason Stephens

== Segments ==
The Late Show featured a number of popular, recurring segments.

=== Introduction: Stand-up ===
The show opened with a stand-up routine, usually by Martin and/or Molloy, but was sometimes opened by another of the hosts instead. The stand-up was often topical, usually focusing on the week's news, or it was about a topic of the host's choosing; for example, in one show Santo talked about his family's highly ethnically styled home — which was eccentric even by their community's standards — with the sequence in question complete with video clips of the house's odd exterior and interior.

=== The Late Show News Headlines ===
The Late Show News Headlines, presented by Gleisner, would blend the week's real news headlines with fake information and footage. For example, when covering the replacement of Japanese Prime Minister Kiichi Miyazawa, footage from an Asian bodybuilding competition was shown. The News Headlines would also feature interviews with newsmakers, most often played by Sitch in costume and prosthetics, and sometimes in blackface or brownface. Some of the better-known impersonations included H. Ross Perot, Jeff Kennett, John Hewson, Paul Keating, Imran Khan, Yasser Arafat, Gareth Evans and Desmond Tutu (Sitch also appeared in other segments as Elton John among others).

=== Mick's Serve ===
This would accompany the News Headlines, Molloy joining Gleisner at the News Desk as Gleisner would get Molloy to comment on a topical issue. This slowly escalated from discussing the issue with an ever calm Gleisner, to an irritated Molloy showing signs of annoyance with the issue, eventually Molloy would rant over the issue while becoming increasingly enraged. The skit would always end with Gleisner calling in Men in White Coats to douse Molloy and the News Desk with fire extinguishers.

=== Street Talk ===
In Street Talk, Martin and Molloy would take to the streets of Melbourne and interview passers-by on issues of the day. These vox-pop interviews often proved more of an opportunity for the pair to ridicule their interviewees, especially their dress sense.

=== The Oz Brothers ===
This segment saw Cilauro and Sitch as two siblings obsessed with the Australian cricketer David Boon. The segment featured catchphrases such as 'I've had a gut full', 'This country's stuffed', and 'I can't burrleevet' (believe it). Their worship of all things Boon included praying to a small golden statue of Boon, playing Scrabble (only the word 'Boon' was used by both brothers), posters of Boon adorning the walls of their home, and playing a Boon video-game in which the player could select the size of Boon's moustache and gut. David Boon himself appeared in one episode in which he read the brothers a bedtime story.

=== Celebrity interviews ===
Martin went through hours to apply prosthetic make-up to be interviewed in-character as Paul Keating, Prince Charles, Arnold Schwarzenegger and Michael Jackson.

- In the interview with "Schwarzenegger" hosted by Molloy, the two discuss "Arnie"'s films. "Schwarzenegger" talks happily about his latest project, and despite Molloy's warnings to the crowd before "Arnold" came out on stage to not mention Last Action Hero (a film which at the time was a bomb and a sore spot for the real Arnold), a crowd member mentions he didn't like it, and "Schwarzenegger" shoots him dead on the spot, quipping "Opinion noted.". "Arnie" proceeds to show off his latest movie trailer, a remake of Citizen Kane, updated and "improved on", directed by Twins director Ivan Reitman, whom he comically and continually refers to as a "genius".
- The interview with Prince Charles was a to-camera interview as he tours his home, talking about the features interspersed with jabs about how much he loathes things like sex with his wife Diana.
- The interview with Paul Keating was a satire of both journalism and politics during the era of Prime Minister Paul Keating going head to head with Opposition Leader Dr. John Hewson (seen in another episode as played by Sitch in prosthetic makeup).

=== The Toilet Break ===
The Toilet Break, as the name suggests, was designed to allow viewers time to use the toilet during the commercial-free show (the ABC, being a public broadcaster, has no adverts during shows and minimal amounts of commercials between them, usually only for the ABC Shop).

The 2-minute-long segment was played in the middle of every show, featuring old music clips, with a countdown displayed on the top left-hand corner of the screen. During the first season, the toilet break consisted mostly of clips from The Natural 7 from The Saturday Show. The second season exclusively used clips from Pot Luck, which were judged by Bernard King.

=== Shitscared ===
Shitscared starred Rob Sitch as a stuntman combining Evel Knievel and Ed Wood (in that he was similarly unable to grasp his own sheer incompetence and lack of aptitude in his chosen field) compounded by the 'spanner in the works', Mick Molloy as his half-witted assistant and Tom Gleisner as the interviewer. Sitch played the arrogant expert, who loved to pontificate about "the stunt game". He would fashion detailed plans for each stunt, with an emphasis on "safety". He would boast about his own significance, mumbling and glossing over any questions relating to poorly funded, rundown buildings and stunt apparatus variously referred to as 'Stunt HQ'. Mick would always manage to ruin Rob's planning, inevitably resulting in physical injury for Rob, which would get him a slap on the back of his head from Rob (although Mick was always wearing a crash helmet). The first two Shitscared sketches were shot at Channel Nine for the unaired pilots of The Late, Late Show.

=== Pissweak World ===
Several-minute advertisements for mediocre theme parks with the 'Pissweak' brand name. These included :

- Pissweak World
- Ye Olde Pissweeke Worlde (a parody of Renaissance Fairs)
- Pissweak Movie World (a parody of WB Movie World)
- Pissweak Aero World
- Pissweak Marine World
- Pissweak World Fun Park

Each would feature a guided tour with examples of the many low-quality attractions. Featuring The Pissweak Kids and Tom Gleisner as the Park Guide, with narration by Tony Martin.

Park highlight narration examples (from Pissweak Town):

- "Ride a bucking bronco!" – clip showing a child sitting on a golden retriever (a.k.a. Charlie The Wonderdog).
- "See a bush printing press!" – clip of a man holding a child's head on top of a photocopier printing out a copy.
- "Ride a stage coach!" – clip shows dejected children inside a trailer being driven down a road.

=== Graham and the Colonel ===
Similar to Roy and HG, Graham and the Colonel were two satirical sports commentators, played respectively by Sitch and Cilauro dressed in green ABC sports jackets. Whilst the characters often forgot lines and used many corny and humourless jokes, the segment was much loved. This segment aired just before the end of each episode.

The intro music for the segment was "Light and Tuneful" by Keith Mansfield, the same music used by the BBC to introduce its Wimbledon coverage.

=== The Olden Days ===
The Olden Days was a segment where the cast overdubbed Rush, a black-and-white historical drama series produced by the ABC in the 1970s. It was aired during the first series of the show.

Martin did the voice of the star of the show, Governor Frontbottom (as well as Judge Muttonchops). Molloy supplied the voice for the John Waters' character Sergeant Olden. Other characters were used intermittently.

The Olden Days was released by the ABC as a VHS video containing all the segments in order, although it has been out of publication for a number of years. On 15 August 2007, it was released on DVD in The Late Show Presents Bargearse and The Olden Days collection.

Actors Brendon Lunney and John Waters appeared as surprise guests on The Late Show after the last episode of The Olden Days.

=== Bargearse ===
Replacing The Olden Days in the second series of the show, Bargearse was an overdubbed version of Bluey, a 70s police drama set in Melbourne, Australia. The segment was originally to be an overdubbing of an Australian soap opera, The Young Doctors, titled "Medical Hospital", but the rights to the footage were pulled at the last minute. The ABC series Truckies was considered for overdubbing in a segment intended to be titled "Truck Wits", before the writers settled on Bluey. This change left the writers with very little time, and as a result the planned 20 short episodes was cut down to 10, which aired in the second half of series two.

Bargearse was named after its protagonist, Detective Senior Sergeant Bargearse, an overweight, moustache-sporting "rough-and-tumble" "'70s" cop. The sketches exploited Bluey's weight with plentiful fat jokes, as well as many fart noises.

Bargearse was voiced by Martin (who ironically was a way taller and skinnier man by comparison), while his sidekicks, Ann Bourke and Detective Glen Twenty ("Glen 20" is a household disinfectant spray in Australia), were voiced by Lucy and Sitch respectively. Other minor characters were revoiced by Cilauro, Molloy and Kennedy.

Actor Lucky Grills (who played Detective "Bluey" in Bluey in 1976) appeared on The Late Show two times in 1993 : as a guest in the mock press conference for the Biodome participants, and in the musical appearance as noted above.

The music used for Bargearse's theme is the 1970 Jazz track "Brass in Action" by Keith Mansfield.

On 15 August 2007 a double-feature DVD featuring Bargearse and The Olden Days was released. The ten episodes are also available on the last two discs of the complete series of Bluey on DVD.

=== Shirty: The Slightly Aggressive Bear ===
Shirty: The Slightly Aggressive Bear was a parody of children's TV shows. The twist was that the main character, Shirty, would react harshly to even the smallest insult. Many episodes ended with a destroyed set, a firearm being shot, or injury to the other characters. In the last episode of the first series, a sketch revealed that Shirty was played by the "Hando" character from Romper Stomper as played by Russell Crowe (though in a "best-of" episode two weeks prior, it had suggested that Shirty was routinely played by Molloy). It was stated on The Best Bits of The Late Show DVD commentary by Jane (who played the segment's other recurring character, Miss Tammy) that Rob Sitch was in the suit. The Shirty costume was actually that of Percy Panda, a character played by Jack Manuel in the ABC children's show Adventure Island.

=== Charlie the Wonderdog ===
Charlie the Wonderdog was a series of (7) short episodes which first aired during The Late Show's second series. The segment was created after last-minute changes led to Bargearse's planned twenty episodes being cut down to ten. Starring Charles 'Bud' Tingwell and the "Pissweak Kids" (a group of children who also starred in the Pissweak World sketches), Charlie was a parody of fictional animal shows, such as Lassie and Skippy the Bush Kangaroo in which the animal regularly ends up saving the day. Charlie was a Golden Retriever owned in real-life by Gleisner.

The sketch featured purposely bad overacting from the children and usually involved an unimposing villain or disaster (such as a "smuggler" stealing "native fauna"—sticks and twigs—from the bush) that had to be prevented. The actors would constantly praise Charlie as a highly intelligent "wonder dog", in contradiction of the behaviour of Charlie himself, who regularly had to be dragged around by a visible rope to perform stunts. When the dog was required to bark to alert the others of danger, obvious overdubbing was used over footage of Charlie with his mouth closed or looking distracted.

As the series went on, the problems and situations that Charlie faced became more and more over the top. Charlie was eventually assassinated in one of the sketches, only to come back in the Charlie the Wonderdog Christmas Episode.

=== Geoff and Terry ===
Geoff and Terry (Sitch and Cilauro, respectively) were two conman entrepreneurs, who would appear regularly with a "new exciting product" or scheme. Sitch and Cilauro primarily used the segment to make Kennedy, who played the interviewer, laugh and forget her lines. Kennedy also admitted in the Best of the Late Show DVD commentary that she was in fact drunk during one of the live sketches.

After a particularly bad performance Sitch and Cilauro vowed never to do "Geoff and Terry" again and the pair were reborn as "The Oz Brothers".

=== Music video parodies ===
Parodies of real songs, complete with highly accurate recreations of music video sets, costumes and wigs.

The parodies included:

- Frente! — "Accidently Kelly Street" (redone as "Accidentally Was Released")
- The Sharp — "Scratch My Back" (redone as "Skivvies Are Back")
- Things of Stone and Wood — "Happy Birthday Helen" (redone as "(Got No More) Melbourne Cliches")
- Cameron Daddo - "Fifteen Minutes of Fame" (redone as "Four and a Half Minutes of Shit" [song covered here by Innes Lloyd because original is missing])
- Ween - "Push th' Little Dasies]" (redone as "Sing Like A Dickhead and Dance Like a Duck")

=== Other segments ===
- Muckraking, a kind of celebrity gossip segment hosted by Molloy and Stephens, which often degenerated into irrelevant ranting.
- Commercial Crimestoppers, where amateurish commercials from regional Australia were mocked.
- Countdown Classics, a segment where footage from the Australian TV series Countdown was presented by Gleisner and Kennedy, who were dressed in '70s-era clothing, sitting on beanbags (one episode included a live performance of "My Little Angel" by William Shakespeare).
- Masterpieces of Modern Cinema, where Martin would criticise substandard cinema, for example Jaws: The Revenge, Armour of God and Houseboat Horror.
- Sink the Slipper, a segment where Martin and Molloy would identify and criticise a noted personality who had done or said something outrageous during the preceding week, and would then proceed, with each complaint they vocalised, to kick a fake pair of buttocks poking through part of the set which represented the personality.
- Original comedic musical numbers were also on the show, which included:
  - A completely original number, Martin and Molloy performing "What's All That About?", the title reused in Molloy's future work.
  - Another included a stand up piece asking the audience what the baffling lyrics to "Stand" by R.E.M. meant before Martin performed his own live version of the song, showing that you could substitute any collection of bizarre statements for the actual lyrics.

The Late Show was also able to get many well loved Australian TV personalities on as guests. Charles "Bud" Tingwell played the grandfather in Charlie the Wonder Dog, and popular TV and radio voice-over man Pete Smith was also a regular. Many guests had cameos of only a few seconds, brought in for throwaway gags. One memorable joke had John Farnham offering wine, producing a bottle of water and smiling to himself.

=== Musical finale ===
All episodes in the second series ended with a musical performance. Martin would announce that Molloy had organised for a major celebrity to perform, only for Molloy to sheepishly admit he had accidentally booked another star with a similar name - most of whom were not famous for their musical ability. The humour in Molloy's recurring "errors" in booking the performers may have run dry if not for the hilarity of having well-known Australian non-musical celebrities and politicians performing.

The performances included:

- Pete Smith performing Aerosmith's "Dude (Looks Like a Lady)"
- Norman Yemm singing R.E.M.'s "Losing My Religion"
- Mike Whitney as Whitney Houston performing "I Will Always Love You"
- Australian Test cricketer Max Walker performing Cyndi Lauper's "Girls Just Wanna Have Fun"
- Australian swimmer Hayley Lewis with "Hip to Be Square" by Huey Lewis
- French-Australian chef Gabriel Gaté performing "Accidently Kelly Street" by Frente!
- Ron Barassi as Shirley Bassey singing the theme from the James Bond film Thunderball (even though Tom Jones performs it in the film, Shirley's version from a later 1989 music collection was released against her wishes when The Late Show was first aired.)
- Game show host "Baby" John Burgess performing "One Word" by Baby Animals
- Children's television host Simon Townsend performing "Who Are You" by The Who (instead of The Who's lead guitarist Pete Townshend)
- TV fisherman and football commentator Rex Hunt in a spangly costume covering T. Rex's "Get It On"
- Actor Syd Heylen covering the Van Halen tune "Jump"
- Actor Donnie Sutherland as Dame Joan Sutherland
- TV weatherman Brian Bury singing Ian Dury's "Hit Me With Your Rhythm Stick"
- Television vet Dr. Harry Cooper as Alice Cooper performing "Department of Youth"
- Grassby, Grills, Nudge & Plumb as Crosby, Stills, Nash & Young. The "group" was composed of Al Grassby (former Australian Immigration Minister); Lucky Grills (from '70s cop show Bluey); Christopher Truswell (who played the character of "Nudge" in the Australian sitcom Hey Dad); and veteran Australian actress Gwen Plumb
- Australian cricketer David Boon performing "Once in a Lifetime" as Talking Heads frontman David Byrne
- Premier of Victoria Joan Kirner covering Joan Jett's "I Love Rock 'n' Roll", accompanied on guitar by her former Health Minister David White who actually did play the guitar for the segment
- Australian variety show host, singer and entertainer Jimmy Hannan standing in for Jimmy Barnes, singing "Working Class Man"
- Boxing champion Lester Ellis as Vangelis playing the theme from Chariots of Fire on piano (not included on the DVD)

The Late Show finale in 1993 had a 'real' guest on to sing at the finale: Don Lane, who was notably appearing on a competing network during the show's Saturday night timeslot.

Famous non-guests were Robert Gottliebsen ("Addicted to Love" by Robert Palmer) and Tony Bonner ("This Used to Be My Playground" by Madonna).

=== Specials ===
- Backchat Highlights Special (26 September 1992).
- The Late Show by Request (28 November 1992).
- The Best Bits of The Late Show (1 May 1993).
- The Olden Days Special (14 August 1993).
- The Best of the D-Generation (21 August 1993).
- The Devil at Your Heels Special (16 October 1993).

== Video/DVD releases ==
- Three volumes of The Best Bits of the Late Show were released on VHS, along with standalone compilations of Bargearse and The Olden Days.
- In 2001, the ABC released a DVD entitled The Best Bits of the Late Show: Champagne Edition, a double-disc set collecting all three "Best Bits" volumes, as well as an additional hour of footage and a number of easter eggs. The DVD also featured a commentary track hosted by Tony Martin, but involving the entire cast and several special guests.
- The Olden Days and Bargearse were released together on a double-feature DVD on 15 August 2007. The DVD also contains several excerpts and sketches from The Late Show in the form of special features as well as commentary tracks by Tony Martin & Santo Cilauro. Additionally, there are another 17 excerpts hidden in the DVD menus.

== After The Late Show ==
Citing the effort involved in producing each week's show, and the desire to explore other formats, the cast decided that the second season of The Late Show would be their last. Most of the performers remained in the Australian comedy scene.

Kennedy, Gleisner, Cilauro and Sitch formed Working Dog Productions, and made the TV programmes Frontline (1994–1997), Funky Squad (1995), A River Somewhere (1997–1998), The Panel (1998–2004), All Aussie Adventures (2001–2004), Thank God You're Here (2006–2009, 2023–), The Hollowmen (2008), Utopia (2014–2023) and the movies The Castle (1997), The Dish (2000) and Any Questions for Ben? (2012).

Martin and Molloy had a popular radio show Martin/Molloy (1995–1998) with co-star Pete Smith joining them often, before moving into film with Tackle Happy (2000), Crackerjack (2002), Bad Eggs (2003) and BoyTown (2006). Martin hosted a radio show on the national Triple M network called Get This (2006–2007), has written two books of humour—Lolly Scramble (2005) and A Nest of Occasionals (2009), has directed episodes of the ABC-TV comedy series The Librarians and in September 2011, began co-hosting The Joy of Sets on the Nine Network. Molloy hosted Tough Love from 2004 to 2006.

Lucy appeared in both Crackerjack and Bad Eggs, and continued to tour with a series of one-woman shows and in 2011, appeared in the ABC-TV series Judith Lucy's Spiritual Journey.

Stephens became Director of Development for Fremantlemedia Australia, an Australian independent television production company. He was the creator behind The Choir of Hard Knocks. He also produced and co-executive produced the 2007 film The King, the telemovie based on the life of Graham Kennedy. Stephens also developed the comedy Newstopia (2007) starring Shaun Micallef. Molloy and Kennedy hosted the Triple M drive radio show Kennedy/Molloy.

=== 20th Anniversary ===
The Late Show celebrated its 20th anniversary on 18 July 2012. Martin tweeted: "Thanks to all for Late Show anniv wishes. 20 years ago tonight I was preparing to tell the nation I'd just removed a hatstand from my arse."

== See also ==
- List of Australian television series
