= Martin/Molloy =

Australian radio program (1995–1998)

Martin/Molloy was an Australian radio program starring Tony Martin and Mick Molloy, both formerly of The D-Generation and The Late Show. It was broadcast nationwide on 54 radio stations for two hours on weekday evenings between 1995 and 1998.

== The Martin/Molloy Team ==
Role	Name
Hosts	Tony Martin and Mick Molloy
Producer/Panel Operator	Peter Grace
Assistant Producer	Sancia Robinson
Announcements	Pete Smith
Sketch Production	Vicki Marr

== About the show ==
The theme song to this radio show was "Eighteen Strings" by Tinman.

== Discography ==
=== Albums ===
Title	Album details	Peak chart positions	Certification
Title	Album details	AUS	Certification
The Brown Album	Released: December 1995; Label: Mushroom (D98019); Format: 2×CD	17	ARIA: Gold
Poop Chute	Released: November 1996; Label: Mushroom (D98023); Format: 2×CD	10	ARIA: Gold
Eat Your Peas	Released: November 1998; Label: Mushroom (MUSH33184.2); Format: 2×CD	27	ARIA: Platinum

== Awards ==
=== ARIA Music Awards ===
The ARIA Music Awards is an annual awards ceremony that recognises excellence, innovation, and achievement across all genres of Australian music. Martin/Molloy won three awards, all in the category of ARIA Award for Best Comedy Release.

Year	Nominee / work	Award	Result
1996	The Brown Album	Best Comedy Release	Won
1996	The Brown Album	Highest Selling Album	Nominated
1997	Poop Chute	Best Comedy Release	Won
1999	Eat Your Peas	Best Comedy Release	Won

== Life after Martin/Molloy ==
Martin and Molloy paired up for other projects, such as the films Crackerjack (2002) and Bad Eggs (2003) and the documentary Tackle Happy (2000), while Molloy starred in BoyTown (2005).

Martin played a small role in Molloy's controversial and short-lived 1999 TV series The Mick Molloy Show on the Nine Network. In 2004, Molloy returned to national radio, in Tough Love on the Triple M network, which ended in late 2006; Martin made regular guest appearances on this show. Molloy made another return to television on Nine in 2007 hosting another short-lived program, the satire-based news and current events show The Nation.

Martin has published two books based on humorous events and unorthodox situations throughout his life called Lolly Scramble (2005) and A Nest of Occasionals (2009), and hosted Get This with Ed Kavalee and Richard Marsland on the Triple M network from 2006-2007. Molloy was an occasional guest on this program prior to the pair's falling out in 2007.

Martin and Molloy had a falling out over a mockumentary Martin made for the DVD release of Molloy's BoyTown movie in February 2007. The 90 minute mockumentary, BoyTown Confidential was not included on the DVD, due to a claimed lack of time and money to finish it, and despite Martin offering to pay the costs himself. Martin was highly offended, claiming it was one of the best things he had ever done, and that people would assume it was not included because it was "terrible". Other prominent comedians backed Martin's claim that the mockumentary was outstanding comedy. The pair have not spoken since.

== Preservation ==
In February 2013, Tony Martin gifted the original recordings of the show to the National Film & Sound Archive. The best of's — 185 audio cassettes — will be transferred to digital files for permanent storage at the NFSA.
