= Pete Smith (announcer) =

Australian radio announcer and television voice-over artist (born 1939)

- Born: Peter Philip Smith; 29 May 1939 (age 87); Melbourne, Victoria, Australia
- Occupations: Television voice-over artist and radio announcer
- Years active: 1956−2026
- Employer: GTV-9 (Nine Network)

Peter Philip Smith OAM (born 29 May 1939) is an Australian retired radio announcer and television voice-over artist. He is primarily known for his work with GTV-9 in Melbourne as their chief staff announcer, including being the announcer on the nationally screened quiz show Sale of the Century for 21 years.

== Life and career ==
=== Early life ===
Smith was born in Melbourne, Victoria, and educated at Wesley College, Melbourne. During his school years, Smith constructed a makeshift radio station from his parents' house narrowcast over bell wire. Smith and Philip Brady would narrowcast their own show to peoples' homes titled "Broody's Hideout" on Sunday afternoons. Tape recordings of the show were distributed to people as far as the United States. Smith has often joked that "Broody's Hideout" was "the world's first podcast".

==== Radio ====
Upon leaving school, Smith joined the Australian Broadcasting Corporation as a messenger boy before progressing through the ranks to an announcer on the home service and Radio Australia.

On radio in the 1960s, Smith worked with radio station 3AK as a "good guy" and on The Greater 3UZ as it was known during the 1970s. Since this time, he has made guest appearances on comedy-based radio programs, notably the works of Tony Martin and Mick Molloy including Martin/Molloy, Get This and Tough Love.

==== Television ====
As television was introduced into Australia, Smith performed the role of announcer and host for the weekly ABV-2 television program Sports View Hit Parade, broadcast on Saturday afternoons.

On 11 April 1964, Smith took up a position at the Melbourne Nine Network station GTV-9. There he did continuity announcements and appeared on Graham Kennedy's light entertainment TV program In Melbourne Tonight (IMT), for which he presented commercials, appeared in comedy sketches and, on several occasions, acted as compere. From the middle of the 1960s, following Bert Newton's transfer to a rival network, Smith took over as chief staff announcer at GTV-9, a position he would retain for around 40 years.

During his time at GTV-9, Smith was also the on-camera host for numerous specials, as well as working for a period in the 1970s as a GTV-9 newsreader. He was also associated for many years with Bert Newton on the long running New Faces talent show and on Newton's night-time variety program. During the late 1970s, Smith also hosted his own Tonight Show on NWS-9 in Adelaide, South Australia.

In 1979, Smith was awarded the Douglas Wilkie Medal for doing the least for Australian rules football in the fairest manner.

Staying with GTV-9, Smith was involved with Ernie Sigley and Denise Drysdale on their weekday morning program Ernie & Denise. From 1980, Smith became the announcer for the quiz program Sale of the Century for 21 years until its ending in 2001. His announcement at the end of the show usually finished with the phrase "Pete Smith speaking".

He went on to become the spokesman for Australian retailer Copperart, appearing in numerous commercials during the 1980s and 1990s.

In the early 1990s, Smith made several appearances on The Late Show on ABC-TV, having formed an association with some members of the creators of the show, the D-Generation, when they filmed several ultimately rejected pilot episodes of programs at GTV-9. One of Smith's notable performances on The Late Show was performing the Aerosmith song "Dude Looks Like A Lady". He also made a guest appearance during the mid-1990s on the current affairs spoof Frontline, also created by former members of the D-Generation and made at ABV-2.

Smith's later roles with GTV-9 were warming up and giving announcements to the studio audience for Bert's Family Feud and a Sale of the Century revival, Temptation, although he did not appear on the show's broadcast (except for one episode in September 2007 to introduce a contestant, which included an on-camera appearance). In 2007, he was the announcer for Mick Molloy's short-lived The Nation. In 2011 he was the guest on the seventh episode of Tony Martin's comedy program The Joy of Sets.

Smith went back to TV in 2019, as he voiced Talkin' 'Bout Your Generation.

In 2025, he was the announcer for the children's animation program Do Not Watch This Show.

=== Other works ===
During the 1990s he was the announcer for television advertisements for the Australian homewares chain Copperart, and had a small stint on the ill-fated GTV-9 variety show Micallef Tonight parodying his usual announcer work, announcing joke prizes for their game show segment (describing an ugly couch as "a welcome subtraction from any living-room" and guests' choice to fly by aeroplane with the question "why risk death by ballooning or being fired from a giant cannon when aeroplanes are available?") and insulting the contestants. He played a similar role on Micallef's game show Talkin' 'Bout Your Generation.

Smith has collaborated regularly with Australian comedians Tony Martin and Mick Molloy, beginning as the announcer for the Martin/Molloy radio program on the Austero Network. Smith further contributed to the duo's individual radio programs (Martin's Get This and Molloy's Tough Love) and appeared in their films Crackerjack (as a passerby) and Bad Eggs (as a police officer). From 2018, Smith made guest appearances in Martin's current podcast, Sizzletown, and has joined Martin and Djovan Caro in a podcast called From the Hideout.

Smith has performed in cabaret with Tony Martin, Mick Molloy and Judith Lucy and released two nostalgic double CDs, Pete Smith Specialties: The Great British Dance Bands Of The Thirties and Pete Smith Specialties: The Great British Dance Bands Of The Forties, containing his favourite popular music featuring classic British dance bands of the 1930s and 1940s.

== Community work ==
Smith is currently chairman and patron of the GTV Foundation. He is also a life ambassador for Australia Day.

== Awards ==
- Medal of the Order of Australia, 14 June 2004. Awarded "for service to the community, particularly through voluntary promotional assistance to charitable organisations".
