= Warwick Capper =

Australian rules footballer (born 1963)

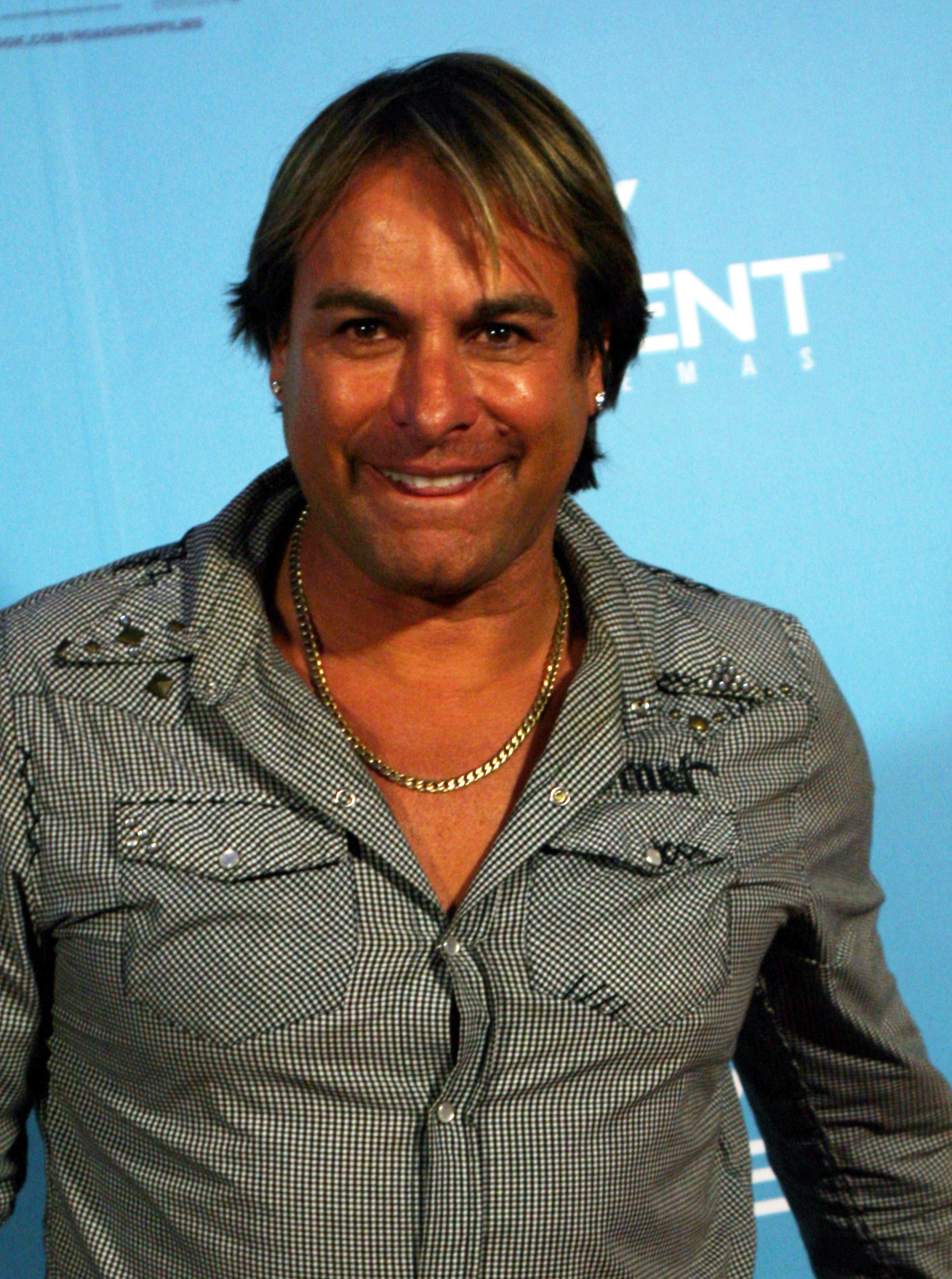
- Capper in August 2011

Personal information
- Full name: Warwick Richard Capper
- Nicknames: The Wiz, Wazza, Captain Cucumber
- Born: 12 June 1963 (age 63); Melbourne, Victoria
- Original team: Oakleigh District
- Height: 190 cm (6 ft 3 in)
- Weight: 93 kg (205 lb)
- Position: Forward

Playing career^{1}
Years	Club	Games (Goals)
1983–1987	Sydney	77 (279)
1988–1990	Brisbane Bears	34 (71)
1991	Sydney	13 (38)
Total		124 (388)
- ^{1} Playing statistics correct to the end of 1991.

Career highlights
- 4× Sydney leading goalkicker: 1984, 1985, 1986, 1987; Brisbane Bears leading goalkicker: 1988; Mark of the Year: 1987

Warwick Richard Capper (born 12 June 1963) is a former Australian rules footballer who played for the Sydney Swans and the Brisbane Bears in the Victorian/Australian Football League (VFL/AFL). An accomplished full-forward, Capper kicked 388 goals over a 124-game career, twice finishing runner-up for the Coleman Medal with a peak of 103 goals in 1987. He was also famous for his high-flying spectacular marks, one of which earned him the 1987 Mark of the Year award.

Known for his colourful personality and flashy looks, Capper was used as a marketing tool amid the VFL's expansion north of the Barassi Line into New South Wales and Queensland, where he played a key role in popularising the sport. By 1987, he was the VFL's highest-paid player, and his blond mullet, white or pink boots, and skintight shorts helped make him a cult figure of Australian popular culture. Off the field, he was known for his association with flamboyant Swans owner Geoffrey Edelsten, as well as his foray into pop music with the 1985 single "I Only Take What's Mine".

After retiring from professional football in 1991, Capper remained in the public eye, often blending shameless exhibitionism with self-parody. His various high-profile ventures and media appearances have included comedy tours; a self-released sex tape; a failed run for Queensland state politics; and work as a stripper, male escort, and Surfers Paradise Meter Maid.

== Early career ==
Capper was raised in the eastern Melbourne suburb of Huntingdale and briefly attended Brighton Grammar School. His father Wally played football in the Ovens and Murray League with Lou Richards and for Fitzroy reserves before a broken leg cut short his playing career, which led him to later being a Melbourne City Council worker. Capper began playing football for the Northvale Junior Football Club in Mulgrave, and later at Oakleigh District Football Club with future VFL teammate David Rhys-Jones.

He was recruited by VFL club South Melbourne and played in the under-19s for two years: 1980 and 1981. Capper returned to Oakleigh District in 1982 to play senior football with bigger bodies and to enhance his chances of playing senior football with the Swans. After an outstanding season with the club and winning the best and fairest in the competition, Capper was given the opportunity to play for the Swans at senior level in 1983 and subsequently moved to Sydney for the club's second year in the city.

== VFL/AFL career ==
=== Sydney Swans ===
Capper was recruited by South Melbourne on the cusp of the club's relocation to Sydney in 1982. He quickly developed a reputation as a high-flyer, with several of his spectacular marks being nominated for Mark of the Year. He won the award in 1987 with a memorable one-handed mark over Hawthorn's Chris Langford. The moment is immortalised in Jamie Cooper's painting The Game That Made Australia, commissioned by the AFL in 2008 to celebrate the 150th anniversary of the sport.

Although Capper was better known for his marking ability than his kicking accuracy, he managed 92 goals in 1986, including a 10 goal haul in Round 8 against Richmond. The following year, he kicked 103 goals, averaging 4.48 per game. He finished runner-up for the Coleman Medal in both seasons—behind Brian Taylor in 1986 and Tony Lockett in 1987. Capper's 1987 tally made him the second Swan to kick 100 goals in a season, following Bob Pratt 53 years earlier, and he remains one of 28 Centurions in VFL/AFL history.

Capper was also known for his good looks, which shaped the Swans' identity during the club's "glamour years" under owner Geoffrey Edelsten. In an effort to attract Sydneysiders, the club's marketing agency, Powerplay, launched an iconoclastic campaign to rebrand the Swans, embracing celebrity culture and "razzmatazz". Capper's distinctive appearance, from his blonde mullet to his ultra-tight shorts, became key to this strategy, with journalist Garry Linnell stating that he "embodied the Sydney Swans—the flash, the hype, the superficiality". In collaboration with Powerplay, Capper engaged in deliberately risqué publicity stunts, including starring in an advertisement with a female stripper, modifying his shorts to tear open during play to reveal more of his buttocks, and auctioning off his jock-strap, decorated with sequins and pearls by designer Christopher Essex.

"The pavlova company that sponsored me called me a cream puff but I didn't care—I got paid."

— Capper, recalling his commercial endorsements and off-field promotional work during the Swans' glamour era

Playing into his pin-up boy persona, Capper appeared comfortable being objectified by both women and men. In a campaign unprecedented in Australian sport, the Swans' marketers actively encouraged gay men to attend matches, and Capper was featured on the cover of Australia's leading gay magazine, Outrage, with the caption: "Aussie Rules: The Hottest Game in Town!" Capper recalled, "I suppose I had quite a few gay fans. At Sydney games a lot of guys used to gather right behind the goal posts so they could watch my arse." One Swans marketer was quoted as saying that, should crowd numbers at the Sydney Cricket Ground start to drop, all that was needed "is to take another centimetre off Capper's shorts." Comparing Capper's shorts to hotpants, satiritst Barry Humphries wrote, "It was the first time in Australian history that a man's balls were what it took to be briefly famous and passingly fashionable".

=== Brisbane Bears ===
At the end of the 1987 season, Capper was lured to the newly formed Brisbane Bears by flamboyant businessman and club owner Christopher Skase, signing a three-year contract worth $350,000 per year, the highest salary in VFL history at the time. From the outset, Capper struggled to adjust to the wider, less familiar playing surface of Carrara Stadium on the Gold Coast, where the Bears were initially based. Rumours also spread that some teammates, resentful of Capper's high salary or media attention, would intentionally kick the ball over his head or avoid passing to him during games. Even so, Capper was the club's leading goalkicker in 1988 with 45 goals. The following year, in Round 10, he famously kicked a late 50-metre goal to clinch a three-point win over Carlton at Princes Park, a result that also led to the sacking of Blues coach Robert Walls.

During Capper's time at the Bears, the club earned the nickname "Bad News Bears" due to their consistently poor on-field performances and off-field instability, often languishing at or near the bottom of the ladder. More controversy came with the dramatic downfall of owner Skase in 1989, who fled to Mallorca, Spain as his business empire collapsed amid allegations of corporate fraud.

=== Return to Sydney ===
Having never quite found his form in Queensland, Capper returned to Sydney in 1991. Despite occasional glimpses of his former brilliance, Capper still struggled to score majors, and was dropped from the side at the end of the season by incumbent coach Gary Buckenara. Capper returned to the Gold Coast in 1992 to play semi-professionally with the Southport Sharks. He helped lead Southport to a premiership that year, topping the club's goal-kicking with 80 goals.

== Media appearances and post-football life ==
In 1985, Capper released the synth-pop single "I Only Take What's Mine", later described as "wonderfully woeful". Its music video, shot at Geoffrey Edelsten's mansion estate, shows Capper leading a playboy lifestyle as he drives his pink sports car, rides in Edelsten's helicopter, and parties with bikini-clad women. Capper made his acting debut in 1987 playing himself in a guest spot on the Australian soap opera Neighbours, sharing scenes with Kylie Minogue. Capper also appeared in an episode of Celebrity Family Feud, and hosted a 1987 episode of the music TV program Countdown.

Since retiring from football, Capper has juggled media work and various jobs. While training as a stuntman at Warner Bros. Movie World on the Gold Coast, he landed a small role as a "brain-dead prisoner" in the 1992 Christopher Lambert film Fortress.

In 1993, Capper posed in an explicit pictorial with his then-wife, Joanne Capper, for the August issue of Australian Penthouse magazine. He also announced that he was to become a male stripper and has also starred in a pornographic movie.

He continued to play football through the annual charity E. J. Whitten Legends Game. In 2002, he had a brief stint as skills coach for former club Southport.

In 2003, Capper guest-starred as AFL footballer "Dwayne Carey" (a play on Wayne Carey) in season 3 of the television series Pizza.

Capper made regular appearances on television as a guest on shows such as The AFL Footy Show. He appeared briefly on the reality television show Celebrity Big Brother, but he was ejected from the series by the show's producer for exposing his penis to fellow housemate Kimberley Cooper during an argument.

In 2005, Capper released an autobiography called Fool Forward in which he openly admitted to using illegal drugs (amphetamines) during his VFL/AFL career.

In 2006, while filming the road movie Yobbos Up the Guts in Coober Pedy with Mark "Jacko" Jackson and Bill Hunter, Capper again made headlines after a physical altercation with the film's Russian director, Kayran Noskca, which left Capper with a broken nose.

In 2008, Capper again made news headlines when he had cosmetic surgery involving botox and liposuction. He also challenged former professional boxer Jeff Fenech to a fight. In 2009, he did box in a promotional charity match, losing a match against Wendell Sailor, whom Capper had previously criticised.

=== 2009 Queensland state election ===
Capper intended to contest the 2009 Queensland state election in the electoral district of Beaudesert as an independent. Capper announced he would run after Pauline Hanson announced officially that she was to be a candidate in the seat. Capper's political endeavour collapsed a few days later when he was advised that he had missed the midday deadline on 3 March to register with the Electoral Commission Queensland. When asked if Capper's running in the election was a joke, his campaign manager, Mark Jackson, replied that politics was a joke.

Lads' magazine Zoo Weekly bankrolled his short-lived campaign but denied it was responsible for not lodging his registration, blaming Capper's campaign manager.

=== 2010 to present ===
In late 2010, Capper became the face of a promotional campaign for the discount accommodation website Quickbeds, part of the Flight Centre Travel Group. He appeared in online and offline ads promoting the website as "cheap and easy – just like me".

In 2011, he made a cameo appearance in the premiere episode of the television program The Joy of Sets, recommencing his short-lived alliance with the former hosts of Get This. Capper continued to make unlikely cameo appearances during re-enactments in subsequent episodes, dressed in nothing but gold hotpants.

Capper was a participant on season 1 of The Celebrity Apprentice Australia (2011), where he was the first contestant to be fired.

In 2020, Capper appeared alongside Pamela Anderson in a Baywatch-style ad for Ultra Tune. It drew numerous complaints over its perceived sexism and portrayal of women, becoming the most complained-about Australian TV ad of the year; however, Ad Standards did not uphold the complaints.

In May 2025, Capper did a video interview with Jessica Halloran of The Australian which discussed his issues with memory loss caused by his head injuries sustained during his playing career.

== Cultural references ==
Eric Bana frequently impersonated Capper on the 1990s sketch comedy show Full Frontal.

In 2007, Capper was the subject of a skit on the Triple M comedy radio show Get This. Using promos Capper had recorded years earlier for an '80s-themed event, producer Richard Marsland edited soundbites of Capper's voice in order to prank call celebrities such as Derryn Hinch, James Reyne and Natasha Stott Despoja. Dubbed the "Capper Calls" or "Capper Files", the skit became a cult favourite among listeners, and has been called "one of Australian radio's strangest, yet most beloved, moments."

== Bibliography ==
- Ken Piesse (1995). The Complete Guide to Australian Football. Pan Macmillan Australia. ISBN 0-330-35712-3.
