= Jason Stephens (television producer) =

Australian actor and comedian

Jason Stephens is an Australian actor and comedian. He was educated at Wesley College, Melbourne and signed up as a writer on the second season of the ABC comedy The D-Generation (1987), before graduating to the role of writer/performer on the latter years of D-Gen's Triple M radio show (1990–1992). Stephens also performed with Tony Martin, Mick Molloy and John Harrison on the 1991 radio show Bulltwang and was a writer/performer on the D-Gen's subsequent TV venture, The Late Show (1992–1993). Along with Mick Molloy, Stephens hosted the Late Show segment Muckrakers. After The Late Show ended, Stephens became involved in other TV comedy programmes, including a stint as director on the Network Ten comedy Totally Full Frontal (1998). From 2004 - 2014 Stephens worked as the creative director for FremantleMedia Australia, one of Australia's leading independent television production companies.

Stephens was the creator behind The Choir of Hard Knocks; he was also involved in chronicling the choir for the documentary series of the same name. He also produced The King, a telemovie based on the life of Graham Kennedy. The King won 3 Australian Film Institute Awards including Best Telefeature, Best Direction in a television drama and Best Actor in a television drama.

Stephens also developed the satirical news show Newstopia, starring Shaun Micallef, which premiered in October 2007.

In 2011, Stephens executive produced the TV series Killing Time, a ten-part crime drama which aired on TV1. Killing Time was nominated for Most Outstanding Drama and Diana Glenn was nominated for Most Outstanding Performance by an Actor - Female at the 2012 ASTRA Awards.David Wenham won Most Outstanding Performance by an Actor - Male. Both Glenn and Wenham were also nominated for a Silver Logie at the TV Week Logie Awards in 2012.

More recently, Stephens has executive produced the AACTA 2013 nominated mini series Devil's Dust based on the life story of Asbestos campaigner Bernie Banton and aired on the Australian Broadcasting Corporation. Devil's Dust was nominated for Best Telefeature or Mini Series at the 2013 AACTA Awards with Anthony Hayes nominated for Best Lead Actor in a Television Drama.

In addition to this, Stephens is the executive producer for Better Man the 4-hour drama based on a true story, which was set to air in 2013 on Special Broadcasting Service.

In February 2013, Stephens' prime time murder mystery, Mr & Mrs Murder, starring Shaun Micallef and Kat Stewart, aired on Network Ten.

In 2023, he co-developed and co-executive produced the six-part BBC One comedy series Queen of Oz, starring English comedian Catherine Tate as the scandalous Princess Georgiana, a disgraced member of a fictional British Royal Family sent to rule Australia.
