= Tony Martin (comedian) =

New Zealand comedian and writer

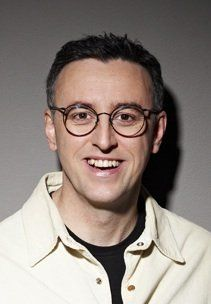
- Born: Anthony Francis Martin; 10 June 1964 (age 62); Te Kūiti, New Zealand
- Notable work: The D-Generation, Martin/Molloy, Kath & Kim, Get This, The Joy of Sets, The Librarians, Sizzletown
- Spouse: Annie Maver (divorced)
- Partner: Sarina Rowell

Comedy career
- Years active: 1976–present
- Genres: Comedy, Satire, Improvisation, Music Comedy

Anthony Francis Martin (born 10 June 1964) is a New Zealand comedian, writer and actor, who has had a successful TV, radio, stand-up and film career in Australia.

== Career ==
=== 1980s ===
A former stand-up comedian and commercial voice-over artist, Tony Martin moved to Brisbane, Australia, from New Zealand when he was 21 to work as a radio copywriter. Having worked in radio and amateur theatre back in NZ, Martin approached the ABCTV's The D-Generation in 1986 to work as a writer, only to be told that filming on the first series had been completed. In the interim, he was invited to work as a researcher on ABC-TV's The Gillies Republic, which was the follow-up to the highly successful political satire The Gillies Report (1984–85). The show was not a success, but Martin learnt a considerable amount from the production's mistakes, and he made his Australian TV debut as 'Man in Bad Suit' in episode 4. He was also able to observe the production of the last few episodes of the 1986 ABC-TV live sketch-comedy show While You're Down There, which starred Richard Stubbs and Glenn Robbins, and it was on the set that he met D-Gen member Tom Gleisner. Following that, Martin was employed for a short period as a puppeteer on the ABC-TV political satire Rubbery Figures, which featured rubber puppet-caricatures of famous politicians created by artist Peter Nicholson (Martin also did the voice of Joh Bjelke-Petersen). Martin was on the verge of heading back home to New Zealand when he was invited to be a writer for the second series of The D-Generation in 1987. He also made short appearances on the show, and featured on the 1989 spin-off album, The Satanic Sketches. Martin began to take on a more prominent role when the D-Generation produced four comedy specials for Network Seven in 1988–89, including doing one of the voices for 'DeGenocide' where clips of the old Australian TV crime series Homicide were dubbed over with funny lines. Martin became a bona fide D-Gen member when he began writing and performing on the troupe's "Breakfast Show" on Triple M Melbourne radio (1987–1992), which led to the 1990 compilation album The Breakfast Tapes. On air, Martin was frequently referred to by the other D-Gen members as "The Fat Man." Along with Rob Sitch, Martin left the radio show a little earlier than the other members to prepare The D-Gen's next venture for ABC TV (although he did make time to host Bulltwang, a Sunday Night radio show on Triple M with Mick Molloy, which ran for sixteen weeks in 1990).

=== 1990s ===
Instantly recognisable as the "tall skinny guy with glasses," Martin was one of the most valuable members of the D-Gen as a writer and performer on The Late Show (1992–1993). His co-introductions to almost every episode and "Street Interviews" segment highlighted his effective comedic partnership with Mick Molloy. Noted for his quick wit and passion for mimicry, Martin also appeared in countless Late Show sketches (including as sleazy filmmaker Warren Perso in the classic sketch: The Last Aussie Auteur), and provided the voices of Senior Sergeant Bargearse in the serial Bargearse (dubbed episodes of Bluey) and Governor Frontbottom and Judge Muttonchops in the serial The Olden Days (dubbed episodes of Rush). Martin compiled all three volumes of The Best Bits of The Late Show with Santo Cilauro and Wayne Marx, and also co-produced the "dangerously overstuffed" double DVD set, The Best Bits of The Late Show: Champagne Edition, which was released in 2001.

After The Late Show finished, Martin and Mick Molloy went on to develop and perform their top-rating national radio programme Martin/Molloy, which produced three ARIA award-winning compilation albums: The Brown Album (1995), Poop Chute (1996) and Eat Your Peas (1998).

=== 2000s ===
In 2000, Martin was nominated for the Melbourne International Comedy Festival Award for his show A Quiet Word with Tony Martin. He made several guest appearances on Thank God You're Here, The Panel, The Mick Molloy Show (reprising his "Street Interview" skills), Kath & Kim (as Magda Szubanski's fiddle-playing boyfriend), and Welcher and Welcher. In 2004, Tony Martin and Shaun Micallef began work on a TV sketch comedy series for the ABC with the working title Mouse-Patrol but after they wrote enough material for the first three episodes, the project was cancelled by management, much to Martin's disappointment who commented in an interview in 2009 that the un-filmed scripts contained the best sketch stuff he had written for TV.

On 3 April 2006, Martin returned to the Austereo network to produce a nationally syndicated show with Ed Kavalee and Richard Marsland on Triple M named Get This. Although Get This was a ratings success and developed a dedicated legion of fans, on 16 October 2007 Triple M announced that the show would be axed, so the network could focus company attention and resources on new breakfast shows debuting across the country such as The Shebang in Sydney and a new, multimillion-dollar Melbourne-based show presented by Peter Helliar and Myf Warhurst, both of which were ironically also cancelled by Triple M over the next couple of years. Towards the end of the show's run, a gathering of about 170 devoted fans took place outside the Triple M studios in Melbourne on 5 November 2007 to protest against the cancellation of the program. The last episode was aired 23 November 2007.

Martin wrote an online column called "Scarcely Relevant" at The Scrivener's Fancy which was updated weekly 2009–2011. The website was placed on hiatus in June 2011 so Martin could concentrate on his latest TV project. The site was closed in November 2011. As of June 2012, the archived columns are available to download as an eBook.

Martin directed episodes of ABC TV's The Librarians and Judith Lucy's Spiritual Journey, and, from 2008 to 2015, co-hosted shifts on 3RRR with Tony Wilson as The Two Tones.

=== 2010s ===
After a successful guest appearance on Sunday Arts (ABC-TV) in 2009 in which he interviewed US writer and lecturer Robert McKee, Martin commenced working on a new programme called A Quiet Word With ... which began airing on ABC1 on 28 September 2010. Rather than being a conventional celebrity-interview show, the programme featured Martin having relaxed and informal conversations with comedians and performers that he admired, and in some cases, had worked with during his own career. The first two episodes, featuring English comedian Bill Bailey and US actor and writer Carrie Fisher, were aired, respectively, in September and November 2010. The remaining ten episodes were screened weekly on ABC1 from 2 April 2011, beginning with British actor and comedian Alan Davies, and concluding on 4 June 2011 with British actor and writer Richard E Grant.

In February 2011, Martin appeared as one of the regulars on the radio-comedy programme The Lonely Hearts Club which was broadcast weekly on ABC Radio National on Saturday nights from 10 pm to midnight. The show, delivered in a deadpan, straight fashion, featured an uncredited Martin appearing under the pseudonym of 39-year-old Duncan Jardine, one of Australia's most successful second-unit directors, alongside Angus Sampson, Stephen Curry and Sam Pang also uncredited as fictitious co-hosts. The first episode was broadcast on 12 February 2011 and the eighth and final episode was heard on 2 April 2011.

In December 2010, the Nine Network announced that Martin would be reunited with his former co-host on Get This, Ed Kavalee, for an upcoming comedy show entitled The Joy of Sets. This comedy television series looking at the elements used to construct television shows, commenced screening on 20 September 2011 in the 9:00 pm Tuesday timeslot on Nine. The debut episode rated well but audience figures declined for the subsequent episodes, prompting Channel 9 to move the show to a later timeslot of 10.30pm midway through the series. The eighth and final episode aired on 8 November 2011.

In late 2012, Martin wrote and directed episodes of a new eight-part comedy series Upper Middle Bogan, filmed on location in Melbourne and which aired on ABC-TV in August 2013. The series was created and written by Wayne Hope and Robyn Butler of Gristmill Productions who also created The Librarians and Very Small Business. Martin later wrote and directed episodes of the second series of the show in 2014.

In 2013, Martin announced via Twitter that he was in the UK working as a co-writer on Ross Noble's new comedy-travelogue programme Freewheeling which aired on the UK comedy channel Dave. Back home, Martin made a return to live comedy with his show The Yeti opening at the Melbourne Fringe Festival in September 2013. In 2015, Martin performed at the Melbourne Fringe with his show The Arse/Elbow Equation which he later performed at Brisbane Arts Theatre in early 2016.

In 2014, Martin and writer/editor Sarina Rowell began writing a new sitcom, Childproof, about a couple who decide not to have children. But after two years of pitching the idea, they were unable to sell the project to any of the TV networks. Instead, in September 2017, Martin and comedian Geraldine Quinn recorded the scripts as a live podcast at the Melbourne Fringe Festival, later downloadable for free. Childproof was subsequently named Best Comedy Podcast at the 2018 Australian Podcast Awards.

From 2015, Martin became a guest vocalist for Damian Cowell's Disco Machine, performing in their live shows, and appearing on their self-titled 2015 album, their 2017 album Get Yer Dag On, and 2021's Only The Shit You Love. In May 2016, he joined the Nova 100 breakfast show Chrissie, Sam & Browny, initially as a temporary replacement for regular co-host Sam Pang, and then as a weekly guest co-host until the show ended in December 2022. Since 2016, Martin has also appeared as a regular co-host on Ed Kavalee's T.E.A.M Effort podcast, His first novel Deadly Kerfuffle was published by Affirm Press in October 2017. In May 2018, Martin & producer Matt Dower began releasing a new fortnightly comedy podcast Sizzletown which by mid-August had achieved over 160,000 downloads. Sizzletown won Best Comedy Podcast and Outstanding Podcast Production at the 2019 Australian Podcast Awards.

From 2017, Martin has been a regular panelist on comedy game show Have You Been Paying Attention?, and from 2018 to 2022, was the official announcer for the TV Week Logie Awards.

=== 2020s ===
In 2022, Martin produced and directed the web series Shut Up, written by Sarina Rowell and starring Debra Lawrance and Celia Pacquola. In 2023, he was a staff writer on Aunty Donna's Coffee Cafe.

In 2024, Damian Cowell and Martin formed the electropop duo Arseless Chaps. In 2025, they released three singles, "Pong", "Lance the Unbeautiful" and "Fosagawi", and three versions of their debut album Arseless Chaps. Also in 2025, Martin performed at the Adelaide Fringe and toured with his show Gasbag, and in December, he and Matt Dower released the 100th episode of Sizzletown. In 2026, Sizzletown, now in its ninth year, won the SONARR Award for Best Comedy.

=== Movies ===
Martin wrote, produced and directed the 2003 comedy movie Bad Eggs (in which he also made a cameo appearance as a game show host), and wrote and directed the unreleased 2007 mockumentary BoyTown Confidential. He has also played minor roles in several films (mostly those of former Late Show colleagues), including The Castle (1997), Tackle Happy (2000), Crackerjack (2002) and BoyTown (2006). He had roles in two films made by his former Get This co-host Ed Kavalee: Scumbus (2012) and Border Protection Squad (2012).

=== Books ===
Martin's first book, Lolly Scramble, a collection of humorous autobiographical essays, was published in 2005. His second book, A Nest of Occasionals, was released in October 2009. The latter, reprinted in a second edition in April 2011, was voted as the best work of Australian comedy in any medium in 2009 by the comedy review website Australian Tumbleweeds. In 2012, Scarcely Relevant, a collection of Martin's columns from the now closed Scriveners Fancy website, was released online as an eBook. Martin's 2017 novel Deadly Kerfuffle was shortlisted for the 2019 Russell Prize.

== Personal life ==
Martin grew up in the small New Zealand towns of Te Kūiti and Thames. For two years as a child, he lived on a boat for five months of the year, as his father was a part-time amateur marlin fisherman. Since there was no TV, he would listen to radio programs like The Goon Show and try to copy the voices.

Martin married Annie Maver, a floor manager on The Panel and RocKwiz, who has worked as an assistant director in Australian movies and television productions. He met her when she was a floor manager on The D-Generation. They are now divorced.

In 2009 Martin embarked on a venture to walk every street in Melbourne. Nine News aired a story on his project in August 2017.

== Filmography ==
Feature Films
Year	Title	Role	Notes	Ref
2026	Cop This	Alec Hydel		
2015	Border Protection Squad	Nick		
2014	The Heckler	TV Host		
2012	Scumbus	Luke Gower		
2006	BoyTown	Kenny Larkin	Second Unit Director	
2003	Bad Eggs	Gavin Clack	Director, Writer, Producer, Casting Director	
2002	Crackerjack	Les Nestor		
2002	Guru Wayne	Executive Producer		
2000	Tackle Happy	Himself	Special Thanks	
1997	The Castle	Adam Hammill	Special Thanks	
Television
Year	Title	Role	Notes	Ref
2025-2026	Sam Pang Tonight	Guest Announcer	3 episodes	
2025	Shaun Micallef's Eve of Destruction	Himself	1 episode	
2025	Guy Montgomery's Guy Mont-Spelling Bee	Himself	1 episode	
2023	Aunty Donna's Coffee Cafe	Himself	1 episode	
2023	The Hundred with Andy Lee	Himself	1 episode	
2021-2022	The Cheap Seats	Himself	2 episodes	
2020	The Weekly with Charlie Pickering	Himself	1 episode	
2019	Hughesy, We Have a Problem	Himself	1 episode	
2017-2026	Have You Been Paying Attention?	Himself	28 episodes	
2015-2017	Stop Laughing...This Is Serious	Himself	5 episodes	
2014	Famous with Luis	Himself	#1.1	
2014	Shaun Micallef's Mad as Hell	ABC Sports Commentator	#3.8	
2014	The Flamin' Thongs	Various characters (Voice)	8 episodes	
2013	Dirty Laundry Live	Himself	#1.13	
2013	Freewheeling	Co-writer		
2012–2014	Upper Middle Bogan	Co-director & co-writer	2 series	
2011	The Hamster Wheel	Himself	#1.3	
2011	The Joy of Sets	Himself	Writer, host	
2011	The Bazura Project	Interviewer	Cameo appearance	
2011	Judith Lucy's Spiritual Journey	FM Radio Host	Series Director	
2011	Dogstar	Voice	#2.23 & #2.25	
2011	Adam Hills Tonight	Himself	1 episode	
2010–2011	A Quiet Word With ...	Himself	Creator, executive producer	
2010	Santo, Sam and Ed's Cup Fever!	Himself	Episode 13 June 2010	
2009–2010	The Librarians	Gene	Director series 3	
2009	Talkin' 'bout Your Generation	Himself	1 episode	
2009	ADbc	Himself	12 episodes	
2009	The Chaser's War on Everything	Himself		
2009	Shaun Micallef's New Year's Rave	Himself		
2009	Sunday Arts	Himself	Guest Interviewer	
2008–2014	Spicks and Specks	Himself	5 episodes	
2008	Very Small Business	Himself	DVD extras	
2007–2008	Newstopia	Giles & Waiter	2 episodes	
2006–2024	Thank God You're Here	Himself	#2.1, #2.7, #2.10, #3.3, #3.7, #4.5, #5.3, #6.3	
2003–2004	Kath & Kim	Mark	#1.1, #1.8, #2.4, #2.8	
2003	Welcher & Welcher	Sex-Shop Proprietor	#1.3	
2003	Micallef Tonight	Himself	#1.12 & DVD commentary	
2001	The Micallef Program	Himself (voice)	#3.7	
2000	The Games	Barman	#2.13	
1999	The Mick Molloy Show	Various characters/Himself	Director, writer,	
1997	The D-Generation: The Bottom Drawer	Various characters	Writer, editor	
1993	It Seemed Like a Good Idea (At the Time)- John Farnham	Himself	Music Video	
1993	Bargearse	Sen Sgt Bargearse	Director, writer, editor, voice	
1993	The Olden Days	Gov Frontbottom & Judge Muttonchops	Director, writer, editor, voice	
1992–1993	The Late Show	Various characters	Director, producer, writer	
1988–1989	The D-Generation Goes Commercial	Various characters	Writer	
1987	The D-Generation	Various characters	Writer	
1986	Rubbery Figures	Various characters	Writer, Puppeteer, Sound Effects Editor	
1986	The Gillies Republic	Man in Bad Suit	Writer, Researcher	
Radio broadcasting
Year	Title	Role	Network	Notes
2016–2022	Chrissie, Sam & Browny	Weekly co-host	Nova 100	No longer on air.
2015	Arseless Chaps	Co-host	3RRR	No longer on air
2011	The Lonely Hearts Club	Co-host (uncredited)	ABC Radio National	Short series
2008 – 2015	The Two Tones	Co-host, producer, writer,	3RRR	No longer on air.
2006–2007	Get This	Co-creator, co-host, producer, writer	Triple M Network	No longer on air.
1995–1998	Martin/Molloy	Co-creator, co-host, producer, writer	Austereo Network	No longer on air.
1990	Bulltwang	Co-host, writer, producer	Triple M Melbourne	No longer on air.
1987–1991	The D-Generation Breakfast Show	Co-creator, co-host, writer, producer	Triple M Melbourne	No longer on air.

== Podcasts ==
- Tribute to Richard Marsland (Triple M Network) December 2008
- Summer Lovin' (Nova) 2010–2012
- I Love Green-Guide Letters (episodes 21 & 65) (iTunes & www.ilovegreenguideletters.com) April 2012 & March 2013
- The Little Dum Dum Club (episodes 131, 158 & 233) (www.dumdumclub.libsyn.com) March 2013, October 2013 & March 2015
- Dumbed down atheist (episode 36d) ( http://www.spreaker.com/user/4582839/dumbed_down_atheist_36d_melb_comedy_fest & iTunes )
- Can You Take This Photo Please? (with Justin Hamilton)
- T.E.A.M Effort (Triple M Network) 2016-) (iTunes)
- Chat 10 Looks 3 (October 2017) (www.chat10looks3.com)
- Childproof (2017) (co-written with Sarina Rowell)
- Sizzletown (2018-) (with Matt Dower)
- From the Hideout (2023-) (with Pete Smith and Djovan Caro)

== Discography ==
=== Albums ===
Name	Album details	Peak chart positions	Certification
Name	Album details	AUS	Certification
as part of The D-Generation
The Satanic Sketches	Released: December 1989; Label: Mushroom Records (L-30223); Format: LP, Cassette, CD	50	
The Breakfast Tapes (1988-90)	Released: September 1990; Label: Mushroom Records (L-30421); Format: LP, Cassette, CD	47	
as part of Martin/Molloy
The Brown Album	Released: December 1995; Label: Mushroom Records (D98019); Format: 2xCD, 2xCassette	17	ARIA: Gold
Poop Chute	Released: November 1996; Label: Mushroom (D98023); Format: 2xCD, 2xCassette	10	ARIA: Gold
Eat Your Peas	Released: November 1998; Label: Mushroom (MUSH33184.2); Format: 2xCD	27	ARIA: Platinum
as part of Get This
Illegal Download	Released: November 2006; Label: Triple M; Format: CD		
as part of Arseless Chaps
Arseless Chaps	Released: November 2025; Label: DRW; Format: LP, CD, Digital		

== Awards ==
=== ARIA Music Awards ===
The ARIA Music Awards is an annual awards ceremony that recognises excellence, innovation, and achievement across all genres of Australian music. Martin has been part of four winning ensembles, all in the category of ARIA Award for Best Comedy Release.

Year	Nominee / work	Award	Result
as part of The D-Generation
1990	The Satanic Sketches	ARIA Award for Best Comedy Release	Won
1991	The Breakfast Tapes (1988-90)	ARIA Award for Best Comedy Release	Nominated
as part of Martin/Molloy
1996	The Brown Album	ARIA Award for Best Comedy Release	Won
1997	Poop Chute	ARIA Award for Best Comedy Release	Won
1999	Eat Your Peas	ARIA Award for Best Comedy Release	Won

== Books ==
- Lolly Scramble (Pan Macmillan 2005)
- A Nest of Occasionals (Picador 2009)
- Scarcely Relevant (ebook 2012)
- Deadly Kerfuffle (Affirm Press 2017)
