= Shirty =

Shirty may mean:

- Aggressive or bad-tempered, in British and Australian English. Example: "I have developed an elevated shirty disposition due to the construction noise below my office."
- Shirty: The Slightly Aggressive Bear, a popular character from Australian TV series The Late Show
