= Pete & Myf =

Pete & Myf was a Melbourne breakfast show on Triple M. It was broadcast weekdays from 6 am - 9 am with Pete & Myf Re-gifted being aired on a Saturday. Hosts of the show are Peter Helliar and Myf Warhurst with Mike Fitzpatrick being anchor of the show in 2009. Richard Marsland was the former host of the show, until his apparent suicide on December 6, 2008.

A podcast of the show is available daily and features the best call-in topics, guests and segments of the days show. "Brown Paper Bag" podcasts are updated occasionally featuring exclusive unedited interviews. The show first aired on January 21 (1 week after start of ratings due to Myf's commitments to the Spicks and Spectacular), Richard Marsland joined the show on January 28 doing the paneling and anchoring for the show, despite Myf originally being contracted to panel the show. The final show for 2008 was broadcast on 5 December, it was a "Where Are They Now" show revisiting the best bits of 2008. The show returned in 2009 on January 12, with a remembrance show of recently deceased host Richard Marsland.

Pete and Myf was axed on July 2, 2009, with the final show aired on July 31.

== Reaction ==
After spending millions on advertising the show, there was a mixed response from Triple M listeners. Many were not happy after rumours of Peter Helliar's million dollar contract being linked to the cancellation of the popular Get This. The show has the same reaction on iTunes being rated 3/5 by users with many noting Get This.

== Segments ==
The only daily segments on the show are "Myf's Rock News" and Pete's "Shoutouts / Shoutdowns", and "Myf's Very Ordinary Album" aired weekly, and "Myf's Diary" being aired occasionally.

== Podcast ==
Like all Austereo breakfast shows, podcasts are available of the breakfast show. Pete & Myf podcasts normally last for 30–40 minutes with occasional "Brown Paper Bag" podcasts being uploaded. The podcast is normally uploaded by 12 pm on the day the show.

== Ratings ==
The show started 2008 with a 6.3% audience share. In the survey released March 7, 2009, ratings were at 5.4%. They steadily declined until the show was cancelled.

== Controversy ==
After Marsland's death on December 6, 2008, Austereo released a statement saying "We thought so highly of Richard that we were expanding his role." Friends of Marsland were furious with the statement. They claimed that Marsland would become a "guest presenter" and his wage for next year was being substantially cut to make way for a "super-producer" to be hired.
