= A Quiet Word with ... =

- Genre: Conversation
- Created by: Tony Martin
- Directed by: Annie Maver, Gary McCaffrie, Joanne Donahoe-Beckwith
- Presented by: Tony Martin
- Theme music composer: Clare Moore
- Country of origin: Australia
- Original language: English
- No. of seasons: 2
- No. of episodes: 12

Production
- Executive producers: Tony Martin, Greg Sitch, Kath Earle
- Producer: Nikki Hamilton-Cornwall
- Running time: 26 minutes

Original release
- Network: ABC TV
- Release: 28 September 2010 – 4 June 2011

A Quiet Word with ... was an Australian conversation television series originally broadcast by ABC TV in 2010 and 2011. Each episode featured New Zealand-born Australian comedian and writer Tony Martin engaging in a twenty-six-minute conversation with a local or international entertainer, mainly other comedians.

== Outline ==
The premise of A Quiet Word with ... was that it relied solely on a conversation between the presenter and guest, focussing only on career-related discussion, rather than the entertainer's personal life. It also avoided the use of filler material such as video or audio clips, and guests were not interviewed in order to promote a current movie, book, or other production.

The show was filmed without an audience in order to keep the conversation more intimate, and remove the possible distraction for those that may play to an audience. Production was kept intentionally modest, being filmed in a local bar using just three cameras, one of which was unmanned, allowing the focus to remain on the conversation. The show was described by the original broadcaster the ABC as being about "just interesting talk, surprising tangents and more than a few cheap laughs".

== Original concept ==
Martin attributed the origins of the show to a segment called "One on One" that he had done on the ABC's Sunday Arts program in June 2009. This segment involved two international contemporaries in an eleven-minute conversation, rather than a traditional interview of one person by the other. Martin was paired with internationally renowned American screenwriting instructor Robert McKee; while Martin reported that this segment started uncomfortably, McKee opened up when it became apparent that Martin was himself a film-buff rather than just an uninformed interviewer.

Martin subsequently received considerable positive feedback for this segment with McKee, which he realised had been both the first time he had interviewed anyone on television, and the first time he interviewed anyone by himself in twenty years. Some time later Martin viewed an "infuriating" interview with American comedian and actor Will Ferrell on the Nine Network's A Current Affair that involved the reporter attempting to get Ferrell to repeat catchphrases from the film Anchorman rather than containing anything of substance; Martin regarded this interview as an embarrassment to the nation. These two factors gave him the idea for a more substantive interview program, and inspired him to create A Quiet Word With ....

== Episodes ==
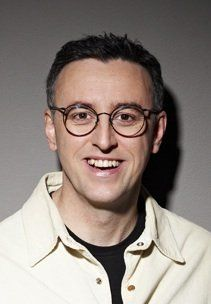
Tony Martin; creator, executive producer, and host of A Quiet Word With ...

The first episode, featuring Martin conversing with English comedian, actor, and musician Bill Bailey, aired in the ABC's Artscape timeslot at 10:05 pm on Tuesday, 28 September 2010. The second episode, with American actress, novelist, screenwriter, and lecturer Carrie Fisher, remained in this timeslot, however did not air until 9 November of that year. When the series returned to air in April 2011, with English comedian, writer, and actor Alan Davies, it was moved to the 9:30 pm Saturday timeslot, where the remaining nine episodes screened in consecutive weeks.

=== Season 1 ===
Episode	Guest	Original air date
1	Bill Bailey	28 September 2010
2	Carrie Fisher	9 November 2010
3	Alan Davies	2 April 2011
4	Rhys Darby	9 April 2011
5	Simon Pegg & Nick Frost	16 April 2011
6	Lily Tomlin	23 April 2011

=== Season 2 ===
Episode	Guest	Original air date
1	Rob Sitch	30 April 2011
2	Rob Brydon	7 May 2011
3	Catherine Tate	14 May 2011
4	Ross Noble	21 May 2011
5	Shaun Micallef	28 May 2011
6	Richard E. Grant	4 June 2011

== Critical reaction ==
A Quiet Word with ... was generally well regarded by critics and reviewers. Fairfax Media television critics Doug Anderson and Greg Hassall reviewed the program positively, reflecting that while Martin approached some guests as a fan, the conversations were generally conducted as being between colleagues, allowing the interviewees to become relaxed and sometimes quite revealing with the information that they would then become willing to share. Rachel Browne of The Sydney Morning Herald stated that the conversation with Oscar nominated American actor Lily Tomlin showed Martin to be a talented interviewer with "just the right note of inquisitiveness in this well-researched interview". Similarly, Matt Smith wrote on electronic magazine Crikey that "Tony Martin’s interviews are like no other, he knows the guests’ background to the nth degree, and asks the questions that wouldn't occur to a more conventional host with glasses". However, Louise Schwartzkoff of The Age wrote that Martin's conversation with his long-time friend Rob Sitch was like attending "your partner's office Christmas drinks", with the "shop talk and name-dropping" being beyond the ability of casual viewers to follow or enjoy.
