= Tom Payne (newsreader) =

Australian newsreader

Tom Payne (born 11 September 1943) was a newsreader in Tasmania.

He presented the TVT-6 (now WIN) evening news bulletins from 1972 until 2000.

Payne also worked in radio, starting as a panel operator at 7HO in Hobart, then worked at 2UW Sydney and 2GZ Orange. Payne spent time with 6PR in Perth as a DJ with Garry Meadows. He had a short stint at 3KZ in Melbourne before returning to Tasmania to take up the role of 7HT's breakfast announcer.

Payne is now a wedding celebrant in Hobart, Tasmania.

== Bibliography ==
- National Film And Sound Archive - Tom Payne radio interview description
