= Richard Marsland =

Australian actor and comedian

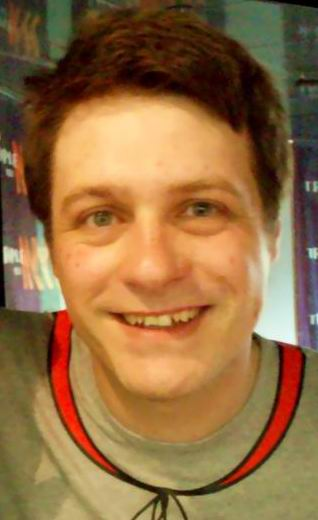
- Born: Richard Kemble Marsland; 5 September 1976; Adelaide, South Australia
- Died: 6 December 2008 (aged 32); Hoddles Creek, Victoria, Australia
- Occupations: Comedy writer; actor; comedian; radio host

Richard Kemble Marsland (5 September 1976 – 6 December 2008) was an Australian comedy writer, actor, comedian and radio personality. At the time of his death, Marsland co-hosted on Triple M after starting his radio career in Adelaide on the SAFM breakfast show.

== Career ==
=== Radio ===
Marsland started his radio career in Adelaide on community radio station PBA-FM then commercially on the SAFM breakfast show with Greg Fleet, Marty Sheargold and James Brayshaw. He also co-hosted a live, daily morning program AM Adelaide on Channel 7, Adelaide with the multiple-Logie-Award-winning Anne Wills, and then hosted The Late Date Show nationally with Bessie Bardot on 2Day FM, 92.9 and Fox FM.

Previously, he was on Tough Love, in its first year (2004). He also appeared regularly on Triple M's The Shebang with Marty Sheargold and Fifi Box, where he hosted a quiz segment known as "Dick's Box".

In 2006, he became the panel operator on the Triple M radio program Get This. He later started contributing verbally to on-air segments, and soon was essentially regarded as a third co-host, along with Tony Martin and Ed Kavalee. The last show aired on 23 November 2007.

Marsland also performed on Triple J, posing as Family First member Spencer Penrose on the Restoring the Balance radio show with Tony Moclair.

On 29 January 2008, Marsland became anchor/uncredited co-host of Triple M Melbourne's breakfast show Pete & Myf, and took a similar role as he had on Get This.

=== Television ===
He contributed to TV shows such as Newstopia with Shaun Micallef, The Glass House and Rove Live, the latter on which he made several appearances in sketches with Ryan Shelton, including a parody of TV show The Rich List, entitled The Bitch List.

In 2007, Marsland also took up a co-host role on C31 Melbourne's The Breakfast Show.

In October 2007, Marsland joined the writing team for Shaun Micallef's news satire program Newstopia, which premiered on SBS on 10 October 2007.

=== Print ===
He wrote a weekly column for The Sunday Mail in Adelaide.

=== Film ===
He appeared as a record company executive in the 2006 Australian comedy film BoyTown.

== Death ==
Marsland died near Melbourne on 6 December 2008.

On 5 December 2008, Marsland was meant to have dinner with former colleague Tony Martin and friends at a pub, but he never showed. About 8:30 pm he phoned his mother Alisson, intent on finding out the family's plans the following day. She secretly hoped the questions related to his penchant for surprise visits home to Adelaide. Instead, it was a final phone call home hours before Richard drove to Shiprock Falls in Victoria's Dandenong Ranges, where he was found dead in his car by a park ranger around 10:30 am on Saturday. In an interview, Mrs Alisson Marsland and her husband Peter, of Gawler River, South Australia, said their son had suffered depression and attempted suicide about 10 years ago but that few people knew. He recovered after extensive counselling and had been "happy and in control" ever since.

But professional and personal difficulties in 2008, including a relationship break-up, wore down his coping mechanisms. He relapsed and reached his lowest ebb in October 2008, telling his parents he felt "lonely and alone". She said he was concerned about what his future held in 2009 and talked about going on holidays for a while. They flew to his home in Melbourne to support him, but, never wanting to worry his family, Richard gave no indication of just how low he had sunk. "He never would have wanted to hurt anyone," Peter said. "This was not an act of selfishness on his behalf; rather, a loss to his recurring battle with depression. This was a way for Richard to get release from his pain and nothing else."

Subsequent to his death, Triple M said his role was to have been expanded on the Pete & Myf show in 2009, but friends said he had been told it would be cut back.

=== Tributes ===
Comedian and Get This co-host Tony Martin paid tribute to Richard Marsland by saying "Richard Marsland was the nicest person I knew. Usually the first thing he'd say to you was 'sorry', but there's nobody I can think of who had less to be sorry about." In December 2008, Martin and former co-host Ed Kavalee released a special tribute podcast on Triple M which featured selected clips of Marsland's contributions to Get This. Martin also dedicated his 2009 book A Nest of Occasionals to Marsland.

Radio and TV comedy duo Hamish Blake and Andy Lee described Marsland as a person who "was deeply loved by everyone who had the privilege of being around him."

Comedian and TV host Wil Anderson paid tribute by stating, "he was one of the finest comedy writers I had the pleasure to work with. But much more than that, he was a true gentleman. If there is a heaven, then God just got himself a new head writer."

TV host Rove McManus said "Richard was a talented writer and performer whose gentle, generous personality made him a popular member of our creative fraternity. The news of his passing is not only a shock but a truly tragic loss."

Comedian and radio host Peter Helliar said "Richard was a great writer, a great performer and a great friend." Prior to Marsland's death, Helliar had praised him thus, "he writes these amazing sketches that are cerebral yet accessible. But even after he delivers an absolute zinger, he'll take off his headphones and go, 'was that OK?'"

Adelaide TV personality Anne Wills paid tribute by saying about Marsland, "I never worked with someone who made me belly laugh so much."

Comedian and TV host Adam Hills said, "He had a true comedy mind, and I was always a little in awe of what he produced. The only drawback to Richard's personality was that he seemed to find it hard to believe the great things people had to say about him. I wonder if he knew, really knew, how loved he was."

Adelaide radio host Amanda Blair said, "We all just want to remember him for the great person he was; warm, loving, generous, kind, funny, insightful and sensitive."

Radio host Sam 'Mac' McMillan, a close friend of Marsland's, paid an emotional tribute on 92.9 FM in mid-2010, saying Richard was '.. a "very funny guy, and very genuine, very smart, very caring guy ... He was loved in the industry."' McMillan spoke about the tragedy to help raise awareness of depression.
