= Judith Lucy's Spiritual Journey =

- Genre: Comedy
- Directed by: Brendan Fletcher; Tony Martin
- Starring: Judith Lucy
- Country of origin: Australia
- Original language: English
- No. of seasons: 1
- No. of episodes: 6

Production
- Producer: Judith Lucy
- Running time: 26 minutes

Original release
- Network: ABC1
- Release: 27 July – 31 August 2011

Judith Lucy's Spiritual Journey is a six-part Australian television comedy series, starring and primarily written by comedian Judith Lucy.

The series was co-directed by Brendan Fletcher and Lucy's long-time friend and collaborator Tony Martin, who also cameoed in one episode.
