= Tackle Happy =

- Directed by: Mick Molloy
- Produced by: Mick Molloy
- Starring: Simon Morley, David Friend, Darren Chow, Richard Molloy, Stephen Curry
- Music by: Gareth Skinner
- Release date: 2000
- Running time: 74 minutes
- Country: Australia
- Language: English
- Box office: A$20,700 (Australia)

Tackle Happy is an Australian documentary film released in 2000 about the live performance show Puppetry of the Penis starring Simon Morley and David Friend. It was produced and directed by comedian Mick Molloy, whose radio show Martin/Molloy had chronicled the chaotic 1998 tour captured in the film. Tackle Happy also features guest appearances by Stephen Curry, Paul Hester, Tony Martin, Andrew Denton, Amanda Keller, Pete Smith and Jimeoin.

== See also ==
- List of Australian films
