= The Satanic Sketches =

Studio album by The D-Generation
- Released: November 1989
- Studio: Metropolis Audio
- Length: 63:05
- Label: Mushroom Records
- Producer: Phil Simon

The D-Generation chronology
| Thanks for Being You (1987) | The Satanic Sketches (1989) | The Breakfast Tapes (1988-90) (1990) |

Singles from The Satanic Sketches
- 1. "Five in a Row" Released: November 1989

The Satanic Sketches is the second studio album by Australian comedy television series The D-Generation. The album was released in November 1989 and peaked at number 50 on The Australian ARIA Charts.

At the ARIA Music Awards of 1990 the album won the ARIA Award for Best Comedy Release.

== Track listing ==
1. "Introduction"
2. "Fart Joke"
3. "Bum Joke"
4. "Fart Joke (2)"
5. "The One About Dolly Parton's Breasts"
6. "Bum Joke (2)"
7. "The One About Malcolm Fraser's Trousers"
8. "Fart Joke (3)"
9. "The One About Caravaggio's Use of Light and Shade"
10. "Topical Song Sending Up the Bicentenary"
11. "Clever Observation About Flatulence"
12. "Fart Joke (4)"
13. "Something Visual"
14. "Topical Song About Our America's Cup Victory"
15. "Something Unfunny"
16. "Bum Joke (3)"
17. "Fart Joke (5)"
18. "Topical Song About Sending Up the Renaissance"
19. "Combined Bum/Fart Joke"
20. "Apology"
21. "Surprise Fart Joke Just When You Thought the Album Was Finished"

== Charts ==
| Chart (1989/90) | Peak position |
|---|---|
| Australian Albums (ARIA) | 50 |

== Release history ==
| Region | Date | Format | Label | Catalogue |
|---|---|---|---|---|
| Australia | 20 November 1989 | LP; Cassette; CD | Mushroom Records | D30223 |
