= Doug Anderson (journalist) =

Australian columnist and writer

Doug Anderson was a columnist and writer for The Sydney Morning Herald, who specialised in film and television. He started work as a proofreader in 1969, staying at the paper for 43 years.

He has served as an adjudicator at the Banff Television Festival.
