= The Joy of Sets =

- Promotional title image
- Genre: Comedy
- Created by: Andrew Denton; Jon Casimir
- Directed by: Simon Francis; Mark Fitzgerald
- Presented by: Tony Martin; Ed Kavalee
- Country of origin: Australia
- Original language: English
- No. of seasons: 1
- No. of episodes: 8

Production
- Executive producer: Andrew Denton
- Producer: Rachel Millar
- Editor: Luke Huggett
- Running time: 22 minutes

Original release
- Network: Nine Network
- Release: 20 September – 8 November 2011

The Joy of Sets is an Australian comedy television series looking at the elements used to construct television shows. The show was originally broadcast weekly by the Nine Network, premiering on 20 September 2011.

The show was written and hosted by comedians Tony Martin and Ed Kavalee, and produced by Zapruder's Other Films, the production company owned by Andrew Denton. Martin and Kavalee previously worked together in 2006 and 2007 hosting the popular Australian radio program Get This.

== Outline ==
The premise of The Joy of Sets was to have each episode focus on one element of television production. The first episode, for example, focused on opening credits of television shows, while the episode's title referred to the term used in the entertainment industry for credits, "selling the meat".

The show was filmed in front of a studio audience at Technology Park, Alexandria, Sydney, however it did not screen live-to-air.

Prior to its production, it was stated that the show would offer "a unique take on television – the good, the bad and the gloriously misguided". While this led to early comparisons with another popular Zapruder production, The Gruen Transfer, the release of The Joy of Sets revealed it to have a completely different structure and content.

Each episode of the show employed various methods to explain the techniques used, including discussion and banter between hosts Martin and Kavalee, video clips from classic and contemporary free-to-air and pay TV programs, a celebrity guest related to the topic of that week's episode, re-enactments by the hosts and guests, and audience participation.

Warwick Capper appeared as a guest in each episode, making an unexpected cameo appearance dressed only in gold hotpants during one or more of the re-enactments. A regular segment in each episode was a quiz called "Not on my network", where a member of the audience had to identify which of three unlikely options had actually been a real television program; this included a gift shop featuring a different attendant each episode, usually a former gift shop host from an old Australian television game show, and different tacky television memorabilia each program as possible prizes. Another regular part of the program was Martin announcing that the show would conclude with a special feature under the end credits, only to have Kavalee remind him that the show had no end credits, which would be met with an angry outburst by Martin or an invited guest just as the episode faded off air.

== Episodes ==
The first episode aired nationally in Australia at 9:00 pm on Tuesday, 20 September 2011, and featured guests Warwick Capper and Peter Phelps. The first season was scheduled for eight episodes. The first four episodes remained in the 9:00 pm timeslot, however, from the fifth episode, the program was screened in the 10:30 pm Tuesday slot.

Episode		Original air date	Focus	Guest(s)
1	"Sell the meat"	20 September 2011	Opening titles	Warwick Capper, Peter Phelps
2	"The secret behind Masterchef"	27 September 2011	Cooking shows	Justine Schofield from MasterChef
3	"Renovations"	4 October 2011	Renovation shows	Scott Cam from The Block, Deborah Hutton from Location Location
4	"Fun Family Freakshow"	11 October 2011	TV families	Glenn Robbins from Kath & Kim
5	"Send It Down to Forensic"	18 October 2011	Law and justice	Martin Sacks from Blue Heelers
6	"Who Killed Warwick Capper?"	25 October 2011	Character elimination	Rob Carlton
7	"What Could Possibly Go Wrong?"	1 November 2011	Things going wrong	Pete Smith
8	"The Final Curtain"	8 November 2011	Finales	Peter Helliar

== Reception ==
The Joy of Sets achieved good ratings for their debut episode on 20 September 2011, achieving an audience of over 1.1 million viewers. However the second episode which aired on 27 September drew an audience of 545,000 viewers. By the fourth episode (aired on 11 October), audiences had slumped to 488,000 which prompted Ch-9 to move the program to its later timeslot. The final episode which aired at 10.30pm on 8 November drew an audience of 225,000.

Reviews were mixed. Andrew Murfett of the Melbourne Age thought that TJOS was the best Australian light-entertainment show of 2011, calling it the 'hidden gem' of the year and saying it deserved a better audience. The TV review website Change the Channel referred to the debut episode of TJOS as enjoyable but lightweight, commenting that "Tony and Ed seem to be enjoying themselves but at the end of the day, this is a nice, amusing, chat show about TV".

Matt Smith, writing on Crikey.com praised the show, saying it was "smart, funny, and interesting all at once. It's well-scripted and Tony Martin and Ed Kavalee are entertaining hosts". Andrew Williams of 6PR radio, praised the show saying the opening segment (of episode 1) was "funnier than a whole episode of Good News World. These guys have a natural easy chemistry that just works." He also commented that the show felt a little awkward at times but overall was "charming". Joey Alcock on imdb.com wrote that the show gave the hosts great leeway to create humorous moments and most of the gags hit the mark. "Arguably the most compelling edge that The Joy of Sets has is Martin's extensive knowledge of television shows, and particularly some of the more obscure and often esoteric moments in TV history". He did comment on the disproportionately high number of longterm fans of Martin's and Kavalee's previous work (particularly Get This) amongst the live audience which he believed prompted the hosts to sometimes overly rely on legacy material and in-jokes.

David Knox writing on tvtonight felt the show was cheap and cheerful but overly scripted, missing the chance to work on the hosts’ abilities to perform live. W D Nicholson, who attended the live taping of two of the episodes, wrote "hosts Tony Martin and Ed Kavalee were in fine form. Simply put-they are funny. The comedic interaction between the pair has always been excellent". He also wrote that during the taping, the show was "Get This in the flesh" but when the recorded material was cut down to 22 minutes, the quality did not feel the same. Melinda Houston of the Sunday Age, nominated it as the most disappointing Australian show of 2011, saying "It pains me to say it. I wanted to love it so badly". Deborah Grunfeld, writing in WHO magazine, included the show on her list of worst TV shows of 2011.
