= Ross Noble =

English comedian (born 1976)

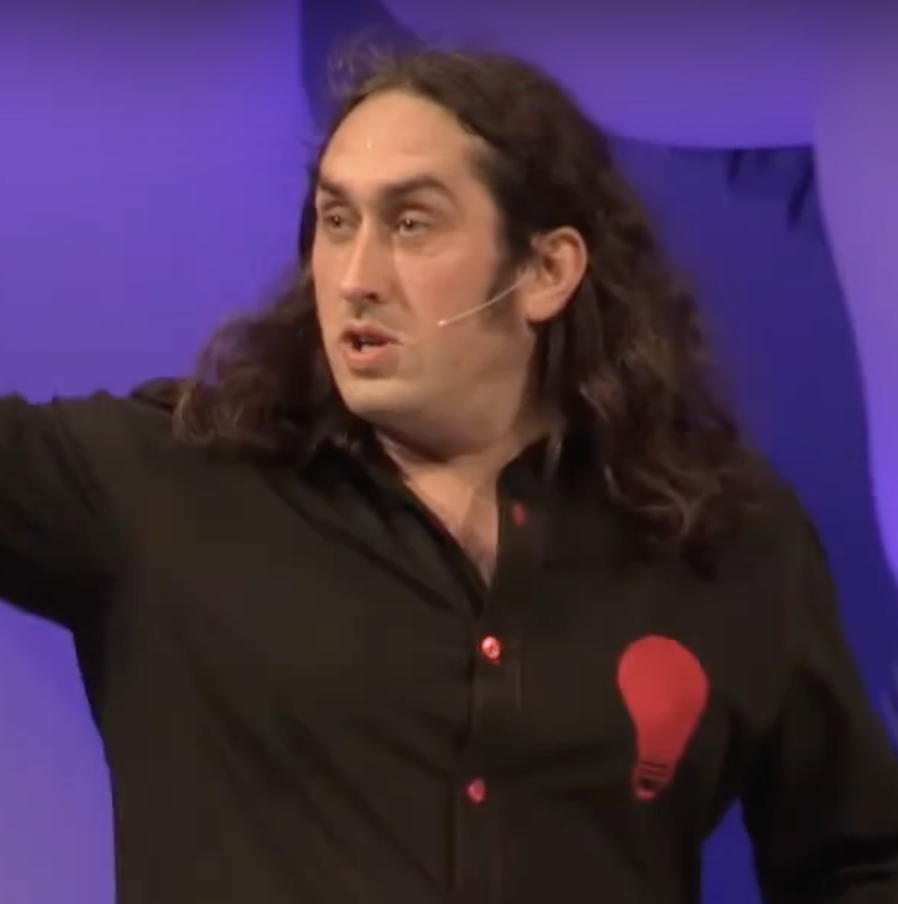
- Noble in 2018
- Born: Ross Markham Noble; 5 June 1976 (age 50); Newcastle upon Tyne, England
- Notable work: Unrealtime; Sonic Waffle; Randomist; Fizzy Logic; Noodlemeister; Nobleism; Things
- Spouse: Fran Noble

Comedy career
- Medium: Stand-up, television
- Genres: Improvisational comedy; Surreal humour; Physical comedy; Observational comedy
- Website: www.rossnoble.co.uk

Ross Markham Noble (born 5 June 1976) is an English stand-up comedian and actor. Noble rose to mainstream popularity through making appearances on British television, particularly interviews and on panel shows such as Have I Got News for You. He has also released DVDs of several of his tours.

In 2007 he was voted the 10th-greatest stand-up comic on Channel 4's 100 Greatest Stand-Ups, and in the updated 2010 list he came 11th.

In 2012 Noble made his film debut in the fantasy comedy horror movie Stitches. In 2015 he made his musical-theatre debut in The Producers and in 2018 he was nominated for a Laurence Olivier Award for his performance in Young Frankenstein in the West End.

== Early life ==
Noble was born in 1976 in Newcastle upon Tyne and brought up in Cramlington, Northumberland. He was taught at Cramlington Learning Village. Both of his parents were teachers.

== Stand-up performance ==
Noble's stand-up routine is a largely improvised and surreal performance with a stream of consciousness delivery. He is often referred to as a randomist. Often, a large percentage of his set becomes based around heckles and conversations with members of the audience. Although he does often have a few set topics which he performs throughout a tour, he describes the planning for the entire show as "about four words on a piece of scrap paper".

Noble often mimes actions on-stage to help the audience visualise his surreal ideas, for example, telling the audience to never put a blanket over an owl, and exactly what an owl neck detection device is ("just a stick with a pointy bit on it") or showing the audience how to serve double header ice creams properly after considering his own made-up plot of 24 in which Jack Bauer escapes a cell using a greasy goose.

Noble's style is recognised as spontaneous, due to his unpredictable performance style, interruptions from hecklers or because he has drifted off into another surreal tangent. During his shows he is known to dabble onto one topic, ask a member of the audience something about him or herself and use that as material, and carry on with that, and later on seems to forget about the routine, digressing into another topic. Thus the audience pesters Noble to tell the ending of his unfinished stories, which are usually eventually concluded at the end of his shows. His most famous example is in his Randomist tour, where he started to tell a story about him being interviewed after Live 8 near the beginning of a show in Newcastle, which he did not finish until the end of the performance, around two hours later. This relates to an earlier comment he made in his Regent's Park show, saying that his mind "Tends to wander off [the point] slightly", and later added that "[he] can open up too many tangents at once... it's a never-ending expanding spiral of possibilities."

== Career ==
=== Early years ===
Noble is originally from Cramlington, Northumberland, England. "The ultimate place to live" helped him with his career—he found little to do in his hometown so he became particularly imaginative. At the age of 11, it was discovered that he was dyslexic. Because of this, Noble decided to work within a career which did not rely on academic skills. He had a brief stint as a street juggler with a friend, and aspired to join a circus. He joined a clown troupe and sold balloons as a stilt-walker, before deciding to become a comedian after winning tickets to a comedy show. As a teenager, Ross was a member of the youth theatre at the People's Theatre in Heaton, Newcastle. In 1997, he was doing warm-ups at the BBC for Friday Night Armistice. One of his earliest on-screen appearances was on Richard Whiteley's regional chatshow for Yorkshire Television in 1996.

Noble has been performing stand-up since the dyslexia diagnosis, and appeared in his local comedy club at the age of 15, despite licensing laws that prohibited him working there and forced him to leave through the kitchen. Noble studied performing arts at Newcastle College, after he told his careers adviser at school he wanted to be a comedian. He later stated that this had no effect on his stand-up ability, as he believes that the information taught is not important in being a good performer.

=== Stand-up career ===
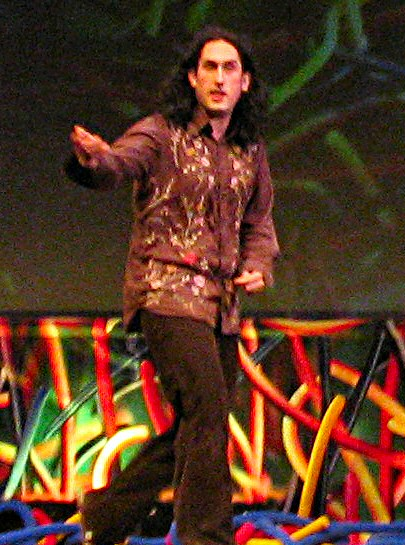
Ross Noble performing his show Noodlemeister at the 2004 Edinburgh Fringe

Since starting as a stand-up comedian, Noble has won many awards, including a Time Out award winner in 2000 for his Edinburgh Fringe Festival show Chickenmaster, and a Perrier Award nomination in 1999 for another Edinburgh show Laser Boy. He has since achieved great popularity in both the UK and Australia, where he has toured extensively every year since 2001. Noble's 2003 show Unrealtime was the best-selling show at the Edinburgh Fringe, before transferring to London's West End for a monthlong season at the Garrick Theatre where it played to packed houses. A recording of this tour was shown on BBC Two in 2004, and a double-DVD set was released later that year.

During 2004, Noble performed at the Edinburgh Fringe and the Melbourne International Comedy Festival and other venues with his show Noodlemeister. His 2005 UK tour, Randomist, ran from September to December, of which he continued in Australia during 2006. In April 2006, Noble was involved in a motorbike accident, and both fractured and dislocated his collarbone. Conveniently, he crashed right outside a hospital. Noble performed his shows over the following weeks with his arm in a sling. During his 'Things' tour, in Bristol on 1 March 2009, he claimed that before the ambulance officers would help him, he was forced to do his Stephen Hawking impression.

While performing in Edinburgh in September 2006 for his Fizzy Logic tour, a fight broke out during the gig, caused by a drunken member of the audience arguing with another. Also, in his Edinburgh gig, some one gave him a basket of mini-muffins with faces printed on them; this is related to a sketch from Noble's DVD Sonic Waffle, in which he mentions his hobby of finding faces in muffins. At another gig, he found someone filming the show on their mobile phone and confiscated the phone. He then recorded a video on it himself. After finding that several people recorded his finale skit, "The falling owl stunt", Noble encouraged the entire audience to record the stunt simultaneously and post them on YouTube, in an attempt to achieve, "The largest number of videos showing exactly the same thing." He then took his tour to Australia in February 2007, during which he filmed a documentary about his travels around the country.

In 2007, Noble finished his Nobleism tour in the UK with a show in Liverpool on 21 October 2007 which was screened live to 43 Vue cinemas. If the event had sold out, he would have played to over 10,000 people. Upon walking offstage, Noble enquired if the broadcast had succeeded and was informed by a technician that "it worked perfectly... but we lost Aberdeen". To this day, Noble maintains that this is the "coolest thing anyone has ever said" to him.

Noble likes to have spontaneous material related to each specific show, and therefore encourages heckling and has increasingly indulged in the audience giving him gifts during shows. At a gig at the Edinburgh Playhouse during Noble's 2005 Randomist tour, a member of the audience put his feet up on the stage, and later removed his shoes and put them on the stage instead. It is now traditional for the entire front row of an Edinburgh audience to place their shoes upon the stage during the interval, which causes Noble much amusement when he returns.

Noble performed at the 2008 Latitude Festival and rounded off his set by leading everyone in the tent in a huge conga line (which quickly turned into a stampede) to a vegan food stand so they could all ask for pies and sausage rolls.

The DVD of his show Nobleism was released in November 2009.

=== TV and radio ===
In 2012, Noble made his film debut in the fantasy comedy horror movie Stitches playing the titular character, an undead birthday clown out for revenge.

==== Guest appearances ====
Noble had not done any acting work on TV until the summer of 2013 when he appeared opposite Ian Smith as a gay lover in the Australian TV series "It's a date", or radio, as he prefers stand-up for giving him the freedom to say what he wants without being influenced by a script or crew. Nevertheless, he has made many TV appearances, which mainly take the form of interviews and panel game participation. In the UK, he has appeared on BBC's Johnny Vaughan Tonight and Friday Night with Jonathan Ross. Noble has also made 16 appearances, the highest number of appearances of any guest, on BBC One's Have I Got News for You including the first show guest presented by Paul Merton.

His most memorable appearance on the show saw him and Paul Merton answer all their questions wrong, and getting no points in the entire show. He was Paul Merton's guest on Room 101, where he wanted to consign to history the likes of Craig David, cartoon animals who wear clothes, people who look like cats, clipboards and Christian rock music. He makes regular contributions to BBC Radio 4's Just a Minute and has also appeared on I'm Sorry I Haven't a Clue and presented 4 At The Store. In July 2007, Ross featured, as part of his "In The Company Of...", on the Colin Murray show on BBC Radio 1, and in August 2007 Noble appeared on Steve Wright in the Afternoon on BBC Radio 2.

In Australia, he has guested on such TV and radio shows as Network 10's Rove (Live), The Panel, Good News Week, Thank God You're Here, Studio 10, The Project, Would I Lie to You? Australia and Hughesy, We Have a Problem, the ABC's The Glasshouse, Spicks and Specks, and A Quiet Word With ..., as well as Triple M radio show Get This, regular appearances on Triple J.

In Ireland, he appeared on the first series of Tubridy Tonight, where he went over to a prop bookcase to inspect if the books were real. Upon reading one book, he found a photo of Mike Yarwood on one page, which he cut out and wore as a mask for a portion of the interview.

Since 2010, he has made eighteen guest appearances on British comedy panel show QI.

In July 2011, Ross appeared in the second episode of the 17th series of Top Gear. On the show, he revealed that he currently owns earth moving machines as well as an Abbott 433 self-propelled gun, which he calls his "Tank". He did a lap around the Top Gear track in 1.43.5, beating Tom Cruise and placing him in second place behind John Bishop. He later appeared in April 2017 in the sixth episode of series 24, achieving a lap around the track in 1:37.5.

In 2012, he was a regular panellist on That Sunday Night Show on ITV.

In April 2012, he featured on Triple J for a day where he co-hosted some shows, and played an imaginative game of Cluedo, where they found people from around Melbourne that matched the Cluedo characters names to come into the studio and play.

Appears briefly in TT3D: Closer to the Edge in conversation with Richard 'Milky' Quayle.

==== Hosted series ====
Besides making various guest appearances, Noble has been the host of an Australian radio show, and the subject of two BBC radio series. Noble's worldwide travels as a stand-up were the subject of his own BBC Radio 4 series Ross Noble Goes Global, produced by Danny Wallace. This series, recorded between April and May 2001, saw him recording his observations as he travelled around various countries. In January 2005, Noble joined Australian comedian Terri Psiakis in co-hosting Ross and Terri, the weekday lunch shift on national radio station Triple J. Following on from Ross Noble Goes Global, Radio 4 broadcast a new series called Ross Noble On... during January to February 2007. The 4-episode series followed his 2006 UK tour, featuring performances in Brighton, York, Manchester and Newcastle. All of the Radio 4 programmes have since been released as BBC audio CDs.

Noble once again teamed up with Terri Psiakis on Triple J for two weeks of Ross and Terri in January 2006. This second period on Triple J also saw Ross and Terri founding "Pants Across Australia", during which, 4 pairs of trousers were sent to the north, south, east and west extremities of Australia and then back to Melbourne. Ross and Terri did not return to this slot in 2007, however Terri Psiakis and Amy Blackmur (the pair's producer from their 2006 show) did present a limited run of shows during a similar time frame earlier in the year, under the working title "T 'n' A" ("Terri and Amy"). As well as this, Terri and Amy decided to continue in the evening slot of 6pm – 10pm.

In 2007, Stunt Baby Productions filmed a documentary about Ross Noble's 95-day Fizzy Logic tour of Australia. Ross Noble travels by motorbike when touring, which for this tour travelled on a BMW R1150GS Adventure (as mentioned during the encore of one of his Canberra gigs), covering a distance of approximately 26,000 km around Australia clockwise from Brisbane. The show was broadcast as "Ross Noble's Australian Trip" on UK TV channel 5 from Monday 28 September 2009 at 10pm for 6 weeks, repeating at the same time on Fiver on the following Thursdays. The show aired in Australia on Channel 10 on Mondays at 10:00 pm.

In 2013-15 Noble hosted his own show on Dave titled Freewheeling. Described as an anti-travelogue around Britain, in the show Noble took the freestyle philosophy he embraces in his live shows and utilised his trademark audience participation gimmick and transferred it to television as he rode around the UK on his motorbike taking live requests on Twitter instructing him on where he should go next, making the road trip entirely unpredictable.

==== Celebrity contestant ====
In October 2020, Noble was announced as a competing celebrity contestant on the fifth season of The Celebrity Apprentice Australia in 2021. He finished as the runner-up of the series, raising over $100,000 for his charity, the Australian Red Cross - Disaster Response and Recovery Fund.

=== Theatre ===
Noble made his musical theatre debut as Franz Liebkind in the 2015 UK tour of Mel Brooks' The Producers from May to July 2015.

In September 2017, he played Igor in another Mel Brooks musical Young Frankenstein at the Garrick Theatre in London's West End (following a tryout at the Theatre Royal, Newcastle) before leaving in February 2018 due to his Australian stand-up tour. Noble received a WhatsOnStage Award for his performance and was nominated for the Laurence Olivier Award for Best Actor in a Supporting Role in a Musical. During his time in the show, he and co-star Hadley Fraser did a recording called "Poddin' On The Ritz" to discuss behind-the-scenes at the show and musical theatre.

== Personal life ==
Noble has two daughters, with his Australian wife. He lived on a farm in St Andrews, a semi-rural town on the northern outskirts of Melbourne, Australia, until his house and all his material possessions were destroyed by 2009 Victorian bushfires. Noble and his family were not harmed in the fire. The family returned to the UK in 2010. In February 2017, Noble and his family moved back to Australia, purchasing a house in Mount Eliza, Victoria on the Mornington Peninsula south of Melbourne. In September 2019, they sold this property for $2.725 million AUD and moved to another location on the Mornington Peninsula.

A keen biker and off-road rider, Noble is also a fan of MotoGP, WSBK, and The Isle of Man TT. He has created an off-road track in the paddock at his home, and has a number of vehicles to use on it, including an FV433 Abbot SPG self-propelled gun. He has competed in many races—notably, The Romaniacs and the 24-hour Dusk to Dawn. He attended several track days in 2011, including Brands Hatch on the GP circuit as a guest of MSV aboard his Triumph Daytona 675R.

Noble is a supporter of Parkrun, having joined in 2023, and has run and volunteered at multiple locations in the UK and Australia. He is also a member of the "MARMY army", a supporter of the MARM podcast and Youtube channel.

=== Charity work ===
Following the 2009 Victoria bushfires, Noble has used the event in his act and donates profits from the sale of the show's programme/poster (or "postergram" as it is called) to a charitable fund to help those similarly affected.

Noble supports British charity Riders for Health and donated money earned from limited edition signed posters together with bucket collections after each gig from his Nonsensory Overload tour to Riders for Health. This raised £42,000 for Riders. He has attended their fundraising event Day of Champions on a number of occasions, most recently at Silverstone in 2010. He also voiced the Riders for Health BBC Radio 4 appeal aired just before Christmas 2010.

In May 2011, to celebrate his 20th anniversary of stand-up, Noble teamed up with Triumph Motorcycles which were also celebrating a milestone, having just produced their 500,000th bike (since the company was relaunched 20 years earlier) and did the "Sit Down" tour. Using only Twitter as a guide, Noble travelled around the UK on the unique Triumph Speed Triple guided by his Twitter followers and accompanied by a film crew. The Triumph Speed Triple was auctioned by Bonhams at the Goodwood festival of speed on 1 July 2011, with all the proceeds (£8,000) going to Noble's charity of choice, Riders for Health.

In July 2011, Noble competed in the Red Bull Romaniacs, which is "one of the toughest extreme motorcycle events on the planet". as part of the Desert Rose Racing Team with fellow rider Clive "Zippy" Town (Dakar 2006) with both riders on 350 Exc-F KTMs.

== Tours ==
These dates apply to Noble's tours.

- Laser Boy (1999)
- Chickenmaster (2000)
- Slackers' Playtime (2001–2002)
- Sonic Waffle (2002–2003)
- Unrealtime (2003–2004)
- Noodlemeister (2004–2005)
- Randomist (2005–2006)
- Fizzy Logic (2006–2007)
- Nobleism (2007)
- Headspace Cowboy (2008–2009) (Australian tour only)
- Things (2009–2010)
- Nonsensory Overload (2010–2012)
- Mindblender (2012–2013)
- Tangentleman (2014–2015)
- Brain Dump (2016–2017)
- El Hablador (2018)
- Humournoid (2020–2021)
- Jibber Jabber Jamboree (2023–2024)
- Cranium Of Curiosities (2025–2026)

=== DVD releases ===
Several recorded performances of Noble are available on DVD, notable for the large number of extras that appear on them. Noble's recorded shows are mostly dominated by Noble with just a few moments of audience participation. Throughout the rest of his tour Noble is more relaxed, with the audience joining in. However, the audience can sometimes dominate a show, as seen on the extra "Live in Birmingham" gig on the Randomist DVD. Although on the official website it states that all of Noble's DVDs are region-free, with the exception of Unrealtime, his latest two DVDs have only been released in Region 2 format so far.

==== Unrealtime ====
- Released: 11 October 2004

A double-DVD set which includes a performance of Noble's Unrealtime show at the Garrick Theatre, as well as a performance at the 100 Club. Also Noble on tour backstage footage and a quiz to unlock extra footage. Also contains a 'trivia track' which contains spoof "facts" relating to the show's content.

==== Sonic Waffle ====
- Released: 3 October 2005

The single DVD contains the uncut last night performance from London's Vaudeville Theatre, complete with commentary and "commentary on the commentary" audio tracks. It also includes his 'meat on the face' performance from the BBC television series Jack Dee Live at the Apollo, which has an audio commentary opinion where Noble is joined by a Cantonese interpreter. The DVD also offers the viewer to play a game of celebrity muffins.

==== Randomist ====
- Released: 6 November 2006

A 4-disc set which contains unedited performances from the City Hall in Newcastle, the Victoria Hall in Stoke, the Alexandra Theatre in Birmingham and the Town Hall in Melbourne, Australia. The extras include the documentaries Ross' Highland Fling and Ross' Australia Tour, and an interactive quiz. The fourth disc contains the Randomiser, and an hour's worth of randomised live performance clips from York, Manchester and Liverpool. Commentary is included for three of the shows, which was recorded consecutively and described by Noble as "four hours of me going slowly insane in a small box".

==== Fizzy Logic ====
- Released: 12 November 2007

Fizzy Logic is Noble's fourth DVD set, consisting of two discs. The first contains a full performance recorded in Canberra during 2007, and a documentary charting his New Zealand circuit. The second contains six shows from his UK tour and special seventh from Southend, which is unlocked by being able to find out where the previous six shows were performed.

==== Nobleism ====
- Released: 9 November 2009

Nobleism is Noble's fifth DVD set. It was released in the UK on 9 November and in Australia on 13 November 2009. It consists of two discs. Disc one features his live stand-up show from the Empire Theatre, Liverpool. Disc two has bonus show footage, a Ross Noble interview with Dr Oliver Double and episode one of Ross Noble's Australian Trip. At the same time of being filmed at the Empire Theatre in Liverpool the show was simultaneously broadcast, via satellite, to 45 Vue cinemas nationwide.

==== Things ====
- Released: 29 November 2010

This was released as a two-disc set. Disc one features the main live show from Manchester on his 'Things' tour. Disc two features highlights from a show performed in a large stadium in Brisbane, highlights from shows in Canberra and Melbourne, a full-length unedited version of his interview on Carpool and his appearance on Friday Night with Jonathan Ross where he had a mock fight with host Jonathan Ross. A limited-edition set contained an additional third disc containing highlights from a recording in Aberdeen. The DVD is dedicated to Noble's father Malcolm, who died that year.

==== Headspace Cowboy ====
- Released: 14 November 2011

Noble uploaded his weekly free clip, entitled "Toucan Bastards", to his official YouTube channel, at the end of which he announced his new DVD. Upon its release it was confirmed to be the never before seen 2008 tour. The DVD is slightly different from Ross's previous releases due to the fact that rather than one continuous main show it is split into six pieces spreading over two discs approximately 45 to 50 minutes each. The DVD also includes a third disc containing bonus material, including a commentary on only one of the six shows, unseen bits taken from the show and Ross's Sit Down Tour.

==== Nonsensory Overload ====
- Released: 5 November 2012

Nonsensory Overload is Noble's 8th DVD release. A 3-disc set, the main live content runs for over five hours, making this the longest-running DVD Noble has released thus far. The first disc contains a two-and-a-half-hour show recorded in Canberra, Australia which also has optional commentary by Ross. The second contains a 50-minute show recorded live at Hay festival as well as a feature that includes all of Ross's favourite tour moments. The third and final disc contains a further show lasting two hours from the Nonsensory Overload tour as well as a bonus feature containing more live footage.

==== Mindblender ====
- Released: 18 November 2013

Noble released a DVD of his Mindblender tour on 18 November 2013. This 2-disc set is Noble's 9th DVD release.

==== Brain Dump ====
- Released: 31 August 2017

Noble announced via his Twitter account that he would no longer release DVDs of his recorded material, but, rather, release for on-demand service Vimeo. Brain Dump was the first such release.

==== Stand Up Series ====
- Released: 2020

Eight part series airing on the Australian ABC featuring highlights from Noble's Tangentleman Tour

==== El Hablador ====
- Released: 2021

Two part series airing on the Australian ABC featuring highlights from Noble's El Hablador Tour
