= A Nest of Occasionals =

2009 book by Tony Martin

- Author: Tony Martin
- Language: English
- Genre: Humour
- Publisher: Pan Macmillan
- Publication date: October 2009
- Publication place: Australia
- Media type: Print (Paperback)
- Pages: 288 pp
- ISBN: 978-0-330-42523-0
- OCLC: 405989298

A Nest of Occasionals, published in 2009, is collection of autobiographical essays by New Zealand-Australian comedian Tony Martin. It is a follow-up to his first book Lolly Scramble.

The people mentioned in the book are not referred to by their real names.

The book is dedicated to Martin's late co-presenter Richard Marsland.

== Contents ==
Thunder Bungers

Martin's experience with the school bully, and various adventures while weekend boating with his stepfather.

We Investigate Anything

Tony recalls his childhood detective agency similar to that of "The Three Investigators".

Pornography Before the Internet

Martin reveals his childhood and adolescent attempts to acquire pornography.

They Get Their Heaps

Martin explains the birth of his love of cinema and his first experiences creating films at school. It also includes his first meeting with Richard Wilde/Wilkins.

Periodic Adjustments

Tony describes his first job at the local army surplus store and its various unique characters.

An Actor Prepares, Apparently

Amateur theatre in New Zealand and feeble attempts to get action.

Thinking About Carpet

Tony recalls his work in FM radio advertising in a small New Zealand town.

The Story Bridge

Tony moves to Brisbane, rents some videos and allegedly sets fire to Wickity Wak and punches out Billy J Smith.

The Aspect Planners

Tony moves in with perhaps the most "piss-weak" spies in the world.

Access All Areas

Tony turns his body into the big brother house.

Lost Dogs Home

Tony helps a stranger find a lost dog and along the way learns that the most effective way to cheat on one's wife, is to live with one's sister.

A Dirty Bomb

Tony learns how to be racist whilst not actually being a racist.

Things to Do in Te Kuiti

Tony returns to his home town to investigate his grandparents.
