= Panel operator =

The term panel operator generally relates to any person who is employed to operate a broadcast console. This term is more often used in the radio industry. In the U.S., insiders refer to a broadcast console as a 'board', and in turn, refer to those operating it as a board operator.

Panel operators usually do not have on-air speaking roles, and focus only on presenting the program to air technically. People who operate the panel as well as having a speaking role on a show are often known as anchors. Most music announcers these days operate the panel as well as presenting their shift to air.

Panel operators are usually responsible for (but not limited to) the following duties:

- Keeping talent informed of the show's progress
- Keeping the show on time, and timing out to news and other programming elements
- Playing music, commercials and programming elements at appropriate times
- Operating the on-air telephone system
- Co-ordinating and inserting elements such as traffic reports
- Ensuring that talent microphone levels are acceptable, and switching microphones on and off

Panel operators need to be technically able, good at working under pressure and dealing with talent egos, conscious of time constraints and able to think quickly when something goes wrong. The entire on-air presentation of the show is reliant upon their ability.
