= Sunday Arts =

Sunday Arts is a weekly program on the Australian Broadcasting Corporation (ABC) in Australia every Sunday. It gives a broad view of the various artists working in Australia today ranging from theatre, music, visual art, film, literature, to indigenous, cultural, and street art. It was hosted by Michael Veitch from 2006 until its cancellation in November 2009.

== See also ==
- Simon Schama's Power of Art
