= ToughLove (radio program) =

Tough Love
- Genre: Comedy
- Running time: 60 minutes
- Country of origin: Australia
- Language: English
- Home station: Triple M Melbourne
- Syndicates: Triple M Sydney; Triple M Brisbane; Triple M Adelaide
- Starring: Mick Molloy; Robyn Butler; Richard Molloy
- Created by: Mick Molloy
- Original release: 2004 – 2006

ToughLove was an Australian comedic radio talk program broadcast from Melbourne through the Triple M network in Melbourne, Sydney, Brisbane and Adelaide.

== Description ==
ToughLove was hosted by long-time Australian comic, Mick Molloy and co-hosted by Robyn Butler. Mick's brother Richard Molloy aka "Roo" also appeared. In its first year (2004) the show ran for two hours (10:00AM – 12:00PM) and was also co-hosted by comedian/actor Alan Brough. During this time, a regular feature of the show was Robyn's fictional characters, including "Mrs. Yi" and "Rosita".

Regular segments include Bombshells, Stupid Behaviour, Zero Tolerance, The ToughLove Enshitelopedia and Bang Out Of Order. Highlights of the show were made available as a weekly podcast downloadable from the Triple M website. Many of their various guests, callers, sketches, and segments were featured.

During 2004, as a promotion for the show, the station released a series of billboards in the style of Calvin Klein picturing Mick taking off his underpants adorning the phrase "Turn Me On And Dress Me Down".

== End of ToughLove ==
The show finished at the end of 2006 when Mick Molloy decided to leave radio. Tony Martin's Get This was moved from the 9am slot to the midday slot, replacing ToughLove.
