= Lolly Scramble =

Book by Tony Martin

- Author: Tony Martin
- Language: English
- Genre: Humour
- Publisher: Pan Macmillan
- Publication date: October 2005
- Publication place: Australia
- Media type: Print (Paperback)
- Pages: 320 pp
- ISBN: 0-330-42213-8

Lolly Scramble: A Memoir of Little Consequence, published in 2005, is collection of autobiographical essays by New Zealand-Australian comedian Tony Martin. A second volume, A Nest of Occasionals, appeared in 2009.

The people mentioned in the book are not referred to by their real names.

== Contents ==
=== Next Teller Please ===
Tells of the decline in use of passbooks in banking.

=== Something Of Dreams ===
A New Zealand TV show shoots a scene in the neighbourhood of Martin's friend from Thames South Primary.

=== Mono ===
Martin and his friend befriend a peer whose religion forbids board games, television and movies, who is rumoured to possess only one testicle.

=== Longnecks ===
14-year-old Martin discusses 18-year-old Donna, who he has a crush on, with her 29-year-old boyfriend, and later attempts to engage her in conversation.

=== The Secret Passage ===
Martin's experience with New Zealand amateur theatre.

=== A Made Bed in Hell ===
Martin moves into a rented room at the Yeoman household in Auckland.

=== No Tarzan, Mind ===
An account of Martin's time in the advertising industry, starting at the bottom rung, and learning kerning.

=== The Yeti ===
Martin's experience at an Auckland boarding house run by a Swiss-German husband and Samoan wife.

=== Breakfast in Dubbo ===
An account of a lengthy New South Wales Bus trip.

=== Unlucky 12a ===
Martin's time spent living in a flat in Melbourne.

=== Prang ===
The events following a minor collision with a drunk driver.

=== The Doctor is Out ===
Martin's experience of visiting various chiropractors to cure recurring back pain.

=== The Notary Public ===
Martin and his wife require legal forms to be signed by the "notary public".

=== Any Old Iron ===
Martin undergoes treatment for haemochromatosis.

=== Donkey Shines ===
Martin's experience with video game addiction, including Pong, Space Invaders, Donkey Kong, and GoldenEye 007.

=== In the Eye of the Lolly Scramble ===
Parental punishment in combined families, and Christmas cheer.
