= Get This =

- Get This promotional shot showing Tony Martin, Ed Kavalee, and the guest co-host
- Genre: Comedy
- Running time: 60 minutes (in 2006); 120 minutes (in 2007; except Adelaide, first hour only)
- Country of origin: Australia
- Language: English
- Home station: Triple M Melbourne
- Syndicates: Triple M Sydney; Triple M Brisbane; Triple M Adelaide; KOFM Newcastle (2006 only)
- Starring: Tony Martin; Ed Kavalee; Richard Marsland
- Created by: Tony Martin
- Produced by: Nikki Hamilton
- Original release: 3 April 2006 – 23 November 2007
- No. of episodes: 358
- Opening theme: Hate to Say I Told You So - The Hives; Hate to Say I Told You So cover by Richard Cheese for the 2nd hour intro

Get This was an Australian radio comedy show which aired on Triple M and was hosted by Tony Martin and Ed Kavalee, with contributions from panel operator, Richard Marsland. A different guest co-host was featured nearly every day on the show and included music played throughout.

On the 15 October 2007 episode, the Get This team announced that Triple M/Austereo would not be renewing the show for 2008. The final broadcast was on 23 November 2007. During its lifetime and since its cancellation, Get This developed a strong cult following.

== The Get This team ==
Role	Name
Host	Tony Martin
Co-Host	Ed Kavalee
Panel Operator	Richard "Ricky Funk-Face" Marsland
Producer	Nikki Hamilton
Sketch Production	Matt Dower
Phones	Cecelia Ramsdale/Katie Dimond

== Guest co-hosts ==
Get This featured a different guest co-host (both local and international) nearly every day, with Australian comedians, musicians, writers, actors, and old Triple M DJs making regular appearances. Regular co-hosts included Ross Noble, Greg Fleet, Fifi Box, Glenn Robbins, Cal Wilson, Scott Edgar, Peter Rowsthorn, Tom Gleisner, Santo Cilauro, Angus Sampson, Andrea Powell, Lachy Hulme, and Josh Lawson.

== Show content ==
Frequently discussed topics on Get This include movies, current affairs, in-jokes, popular culture, Martin's and Kavalee's own lives, Marsland's peculiar interests and perverse hobbies, amusing news articles (particularly news involving nudity) from around the world, and gossip from "celebrity insiders, onlookers, pals and lunchers" from tabloid magazines.

Martin and the others created various comedy sketches that included the edited recordings of politicians such as then politicians John Howard, Peter Costello and Kim Beazley musical parodies, advertisements and other sketches. Soundbites also featured regularly, with humorous comments, sounds, or sayings from politicians or the popular media included in various jokes, interviews, and songs.

The show contained frequent references to Karl Stefanovic being a robot.

=== Talkback Mountain ===
Talkback Mountain was a segment in the show where a number of listeners called in to briefly discuss a chosen topic with the hosts, or share a related anecdote with the listeners. In this segment there were also 'dovetails', where Kavalee would ask callers a follow-up question that runs counter to the main phone-in topic.

The segment was originally introduced by a sample from the Cliff Hangers pricing game on The Price Is Right. An alternative theme tune which is used is a sample of the song "Tainted Love", and a range of sound effects including a goat bleating and yodeling. In the latter half of 2007, the show's sketch producer, Matt Dower, began creating new Talkback Mountain themes on a more regular basis, including one based on the Sonny & Cher song "I Got You Babe" and one based on the Jive Bunny version of the Hawaii Five-O theme.

== Timeslots ==
Get This hosts: Ed Kavalee (left) and Tony Martin

Get This first aired on 3 April 2006, running for one hour from 9am - 10am, with the final episode for the 2006 season airing on 1 December 2006.

The show returned in 2007 on Monday, 29 January in a new two-hour format. The timeslot consisted of 11am - 12pm AEST being hosted by Martin and Kavalee, whilst from 12pm - 1pm a different co-host joined in nearly every day. On Triple M Adelaide only the first hour of the program was played from 12pm - 1pm.

On 17 September 2007, after a two-week break, Get This moved to the "sexy new time" of 2pm - 4pm weekdays, however it retained the same two-hour format. On Triple M Adelaide only the first hour of the program was played from 3pm - 4pm. The constantly changing timeslots became a running gag on the show, particularly when referencing Adelaide listeners.

== Downloads ==
On the Get This website, there were a variety of items to download, including ringtones which are made from soundbites used on the program. Some of these include "John Howard falling off a cliff" and Rex Hunt's "I got my rocks off" ringtones.

Also available on the site was an archive of selected sketches under the banners of Recent Offences and Prior Offences. These included Kim Beazley's rants on cheese and dog's breakfasts, and Tony Soprano calling Channel Nine to complain about his timeslot.

=== Podcast ===
Highlights of the show were made available as free bi-weekly podcasts downloadable from the Triple M website and the iTunes Store. Due to copyright and licensing reasons, podcasts could not include most of the music that was used on the radio show. Because of this, some of Martin's comedy sketches could not be heard on the podcast. Earlier sketches containing copyright music were included on the ends of later Podcasts, from #144 (29 October 2007) onwards.

Aside from weekly wrap-up podcasts, special podcasts were often also released - for example those featuring a notable guest or a milestone episode.

The show's podcasts were removed as of 1 January 2008 from the Triple M website, and were also removed from iTunes. From 4 August 2009 all of the 163 Get This podcasts were reinstated to the iTunes Store under the name of "Get This - Richard Marsland Lives Podcast", however they have since been removed.

== CD ==
Get This Illegal Download

Martin announced on the Friday 8 September 2006 show that an audio CD based on the show was in the planning and production phase, with only 1000 copies to be pressed. On the Friday 3 November 2006 show, the finished CD Illegal Download, was unveiled on-air as the new prize for callers to the Talkback Mountain segment. The CD features various guest co-host interviews as well as Martin reading a chapter of his book Lolly Scramble.

The track listing of Illegal Download is as follows:

1. You Dirty Bird (28 April 2006)
2. Car City Eyes (26 July 2006)
3. Penis Painting (5 May 2006)
4. Tom Gleisner: The Golden Mile (5 April 2006)
5. Angus Sampson: Ready To Rock (20 April 2006)
6. Ross Noble: Up J'Taime (21 April 2006)
7. Grant Spatchcock Gourmet Pizza (2 June 2006)
8. Tasty Treats (29 May 2006)
9. Knife Amnesty (17 July 2006)
10. Zebra Damage (8 August 2006)
11. Robyn Butler: Artist's Impression (14 July 2006)
12. What's Eating Laurie Oakes? (19 July 2006)
13. Servo Bargains (14 July 2006)
14. Beazley Cheese (5 April 2006)
15. Craig Eagle: 10 Year Stiffy (29 June 2006)
16. Sex News (23 June 2006)
17. Dave Graney: Old Vinyl (7 July 2006)
18. Greg Fleet: On The Spicy Hot Bonner (sic) (11 July 2006)
19. Ooh Me Plums Again! (11 July 2006)
20. Ed's European Vacation (13 July 2006)
21. Kevin Smith: Nerdsville (25 August 2006)
22. Scott Edgar: Return To Nerdsville (9 August 2006)
23. Not Having Kids (4 August 2006)
24. Greg Fleet: Delivery Man 2 (1 May 2006)
25. Ten A Penny (7 September 2006)
26. Musical Finale (16 August 2006)
27. Breakfast In Dubbo (From Lolly Scramble by Tony Martin)

After all copies of the album were given away as prizes, tracks became available for free download at the Triple M website.

== iOS App ==
A Get This iOS app was made available in late 2009 called The Marsland 5000. It features a number of classic soundbites from the show.

== Notable events, episodes and running gags ==
- 'The Capper Calls' - one of the most popular sketches on the program featured Richard Marsland calling celebrities with edited portions of a Warwick Capper Soundboard, duping them into conversations.
- Richard Marsland's nicknames were a constant feature with the most popular being Armitage Shanks - a brand of toilet that Richard used as an acting name.
- "How Richard lives his life" where listeners would come up with suggestions as to how they thought Marsland lived his life. The most common theory being that he had a room dedicated to lotion - in the style of Buffalo Bill from Silence of the Lambs.
- For a number of weeks when Get This started on air, "Prize King" Ed Kavalee awarded prizes to the best callers during the show's Talkback Mountain segment. He claimed to have purchased the items from Variety Gift Shops. Callers were often indifferent after having been awarded a prize such as a small dolphin trinket. The backing track to these prize segments was often "Samba De Orfeu".

Satiny Caftan Day

- Kavalee's live sketches, usually performed with the assistance of Marsland, usually come across as being very hectic, with Kavalee often forgetting the next part of the sketch and having to be prompted by Marsland. His most famous character is "man with a box of killer bees", who has also appeared with a flock of killer pelicans. He usually threatens the crowd into giving him their "worldly possessions" or they will face the wrath of the killer bees/pelicans. Second to this is his sketches that invariably start with, "I'm Richard," presenting an effeminate, incapable or simply ridiculous commentary on what he assumes Marsland is thinking at that moment.
- It was announced during an early show that during Santo Cilauro's radio career at Triple M he often received mail with misspellings of his name, the most notable being "Snato Ghauro". Cilauro was often referred to as Snato on the show.
- Constant references were made to Kavalee's other public forays, including a KFC TV commercial in which Kavalee appeared as a customer with a considerable helmet of hair, and his being mistaken for TV commercial characters, especially the "GE Money Genie" and the "Carpet Court Jester".
- A running gag that Australian TV presenter Karl Stefanovic is not a human, and is in fact a robot.
- Repeated airing of radio personality Rex Hunt soundbites. In 2006 it was a rant in response to his sex scandal regarding his wealth and sexual prowess, in 2007 it has been snippets from a 15-minute rambling spray on AM radio against various "knockers" of Hunt, such as the scallop industry.
- Satiny Caftan Day - Martin and Kavalee found a picture of Kamahl wearing a colourful kaftan. From this, they had ordered a set of kaftans and held a "all-kaftan" day when they were delivered on 31 October 2006.
- Discussing (and often being amused by) the Get This-related vandalism on English Wikipedia. Kavalee and Martin repeatedly encouraged vandalism to the page which resulted in it being locked.
- Greg Fleet came up with the concept of a TV show called "Passiona High" the cast of which would be formed from the Get This team. The cast list is featured on the Get This page on the Triple M website. The cast of Passiona High includes Kavalee as 'Groundskeeper Gus', continuing his role as Gus on his KFC ads, Marsland as school jock, and a dopey character known as 'Nodge'. Martin plays the captain of the Chess Club, spending every lunchtime at lonely chess club meetings.
- Martin and Kavalee have discussed often that April 2007 be redesignated as "Capril" (a portmanteau of the words Cape and April), a month where all listeners should wear capes in public, conducting day to day activities. The tagline for the month was: "Are you capable?". This activity has continued since the show's cancellation as an awareness and fundraising activity for depression, which claimed the life of panel operator Richard Marsland.
- Martin shouting "Oooh me plums!" whenever injured testicles are mentioned on the show, usually followed by a comedic 'boing'.
- Martin gently prodding and persistently bringing up details and discussion of "Meat Pie", an unreleased film that Kavalee starred in and is massively embarrassed about. Due to Martin's petitioning, the official "trailor" can now be found on YouTube.
- Greg Fleet's running gag "Jumper-pants" (wearing a jumper like you would pants) has even found itself a theme song (Turn your smile into a frown, turn your wardrobe up-side down, JUMPERPANTS!).
- Segue into songs. Martin will often ask Marsland a question, with the answer being the opening lyric of the song. Many songs are introduced as if being played live (typically on multiple instruments at once) by Kavalee.
- The team called the month of August "Borgust" and encouraged listeners to send in photos of themselves dressed (as poorly as possible) like the Borg from Star Trek.
- A number of clips have been played from the New Zealand Police reality TV series, Ten 7 Aotearoa, most notably of a drunken man asking, "How come?" in response to a police officer telling him that he has been arrested for disorderly conduct. Another notable quote is another man yelling, "Assault! Assault!", the man pauses, then "You touched me officer, sorry."
- On Thursday 30 August, while 'testing' one of the remote-controlled helicopters that were to be given as prizes for "Borgust", Kavalee accidentally touched the antenna of the remote control to his microphone, receiving an electric shock. This sound bite was later crowbarred, poorly, into other segments for comic effect.
- Reference is often made to the fact that Kavalee eats during the segment, after Martin revealed that a ruffling paper noise heard in the background was actually Kavalee unwrapping a sandwich. Sometimes Martin asks Kavalee towards the beginning of the segment what he will be eating that day.
- On Monday 5 November, support rallies were held outside Triple M studios in both Melbourne and Sydney by fans of the show, in response to the cancellation of the Get This. During and after the show, Tony, Ed and Richard addressed the crowd and several references were made to its presence throughout the show. Fans were also introduced to Matty Dower, and the rest of the production team was acknowledged for its contributions. Newspaper reports placed the crowd numbers at the Melbourne rally at approximately 170 people.
- At the same time as the Melbourne rally, a smaller rally calling for the continuation of Get This was held outside the Triple M offices in Sydney. During the show a live cross was made from the Sydney Rally to the studio which outlined the fact that Triple M Sydney had asked security to move the rally on. This would later form the basis of the Key Phrase of the Day, whilst a blog about the Sydney Rally was read out on the show on Tuesday 6 November.
- A running joke is often floated about one of Marsland's previous jobs, hosting The Late Date Show with Bessie Bardot.
- Key Phrases: at the end of each show, Tony would pick a phrase from the day that tickled his spicy hot bonner and repeat it.

== Cancellation of Get This ==
On 15 October 2007, it was announced on-air that Get This would be finishing up at the end of 2007, with the final show being aired on 23 November. The reason cited was that Triple M would be concentrating on their breakfast shows., such as The Shebang in Sydney and a new, multi-million dollar Melbourne-based show presented by Peter Helliar and Myf Warhurst. An article in the Herald Sun Guide 2 January 2008 perpetuated the rumour that Get This was "Axed to make way for Helliar's alleged $1 million plus salary".

Separate to that, in broadcasts aired on 16 and 17 October 2007, Martin made mention of a petition that various listeners of Get This had mounted in an attempt to save the program.

Several media outlets have published stories regarding the cancellation of the program. The non-renewal of the program was also a surprise considering the ratings that the show was generating. Shortly before the cancellation of the show, local papers described Get This as 'so popular that the Austereo network doesn't know what to do with them'. In Melbourne, Get This was second in its slot, while the station is fifth overall. In Sydney Get This was fifth, Triple M ninth; in Brisbane Get This was second, Triple M fourth; and while in Adelaide the program was in third place, while the station lags in sixth place.

Another article in The Age noted that "In a pattern repeated across the country, figures jumped from about 5 per cent audience share to about 11 per cent during the two-hour program, when it aired from 11am. They fell back to near 6 per cent when the station returned to music."

The final show was broadcast on 23 November 2007. The final sketch depicted Tony, Ed and Richard getting in a bus, replete with Vengaboys' song "We Like to Party" playing, before fading the broadcast out. Excluding this sketch, and the musical montage that preceded it, the final live sentence said on the show was, "and here endeth the sizzle" by Tony Martin. The final words heard were by John Howard: "Oh no, that's not funny at all".

=== Richard Marsland tribute podcast ===
Tony and Ed reunited to release a final Get This podcast on 24 December 2008, as a tribute to Richard Marsland after his death, with some of Marsland's most popular moments. As was common for Get This, the tribute episode ran overtime.

== Preservation ==
In February 2013, Tony Martin gifted the recordings of every Get This episode to the National Film & Sound Archive. The recordings, in the form of 545 audio CDs, will be stored by the archive both physically and as digital files. At the same time, Martin also donated his personal collection of recorded highlights from the Martin/Molloy Show.
