= BoyTown =

- DVD cover
- Directed by: Kevin Carlin
- Written by: Mick Molloy; Richard Molloy
- Produced by: Greg Sitch; Mick Molloy
- Starring: Glenn Robbins; Mick Molloy; Bob Franklin; Wayne Hope; Gary Eck; Lachy Hulme; Sally Phillips; Lois Ramsey
- Cinematography: Mark Wareham
- Edited by: Angie Higgins
- Music by: Gareth Skinner
- Distributed by: Roadshow Films
- Release date: 19 October 2006
- Running time: 88 minutes
- Country: Australia
- Language: English
- Box office: A$3.1 million

BoyTown is a 2006 Australian comedy film, directed by Kevin Carlin and starring an ensemble cast of prominent Australian comedians, including Glenn Robbins, Mick Molloy, Bob Franklin, Wayne Hope and Gary Eck. It was filmed in Melbourne, Victoria.

An official preview showing of the film was held in Sydney on 16 October 2006. BoyTown was released in Australia on 19 October 2006. It grossed A$3.1 million in its home country.

== Plot ==
BoyTown, the greatest boyband of the eighties and the group that started the boyband phenomenon, leave their terrible lives and low-paying jobs for one last attempt at the big time. They return to the stage with slightly older fans and slightly larger pants to complete some unfinished business. These days they spend less time singing about tears, eternity, angels and their 'baby' and more time singing about divorce, shopping, and picking up the kids from school.

As their triumphant tour draws to a conclusion all the personal issues that have been safely buried away for twenty years come bubbling to the surface with explosive consequences. Suddenly the band has to deal with allegations of infidelity, paternity tests, a miming fiasco, a band member "outing" himself live on stage, an awards night disaster, solo albums, a mysterious disappearance, and a plane journey that will cement the BoyTown legend forever.

=== BoyTown Confidential ===
The official BoyTown website features clips from a mockumentary BoyTown Confidential, hosted by Tony Martin as "Kenny Larkin", his character from the movie.

The mockumentary was supposed to be included in its entirety on the DVD release of BoyTown, but was not included. Mick Molloy's Molloy Boy Productions has commented that it was left out due to lack of post-production funding. However, Tony Martin said that he would have paid the estimated $5000 post-production cost as he believed it was one of his finest works. Speculation persists that Molloy thought the mockumentary would upstage the film itself. This has led to an ongoing rift between longtime collaborators Martin and Molloy.

== Cast ==
- Glenn Robbins as Benny G
- Mick Molloy as Tommy Boy
- Bob Franklin as Bobby Mac
- Wayne Hope as Carl
- Gary Eck as Corey
- Sally Phillips as Holly
- Lachy Hulme as Marty Boomstein
- Sarah Walker as Katie
- Lois Ramsey as Gran
- Victoria Hill as Rosalita
- Syd Brisbane as Jeff
- Greg Stone as Air Traffic Controller
- Andrew Curry as Pilot
- Eddie Baroo as Builder

The film also features cameos by Tony Martin, Josh Lawson, Ed Kavalee, Akmal Saleh, James Mathison, Greg Stone and Ella Hooper.

== Soundtrack ==
The soundtrack was released in Australia by Liberation Music on 30 September, featuring vocal performances by Joel Silbersher, Bram Presser, Simon Cleary, Christian Argenti and Julian Argenti as "BoyTown", with music by Gareth Skinner, and lyrics by Mick Molloy & Richard Molloy.

Track listing:

1. "Boytown '89"
2. "Tough Titties"
3. "Love 2 Love"
4. "I Cry"
5. "Angel Baby"
6. "Picking The Kids Up From School"
7. "Layby Love"
8. "Ring My Bell"
9. "Pussywhipped"
10. "Love Handles"
11. "Parent Teacher Night"
12. "Dishpan Hands"
13. "Cellulite Lady"
14. "Special Time (Of The Month)"
15. "Do Me"
16. "Stay at Home Dad"
17. "Boytown 2006"
18. "Seasons in the Sun"
19. "My Beautiful Wife"
20. "Gold" (Performed By Spandau Ballet)
21. "Love 2 Love"

== Box office ==
BoyTown grossed $3,135,972 at the box office in Australia.

== Discography ==
=== Singles ===
List of singles, with selected chart positions
Title	Year	Peak chart positions	Album
Title	Year	AUS	Album
"I Cry"	2006	70	BoyTown

== See also ==
- Cinema of Australia
- List of Australian films of 2006
