= Mike Fitzpatrick (broadcaster) =

Australian radio personality

Michael David Fitzpatrick
- Born: 26 September 1973 (age 53); Bathurst, New South Wales, Australia
- Education: Charles Sturt University

Michael Fitzpatrick (born 26 September 1973) is an Australian radio executive and audio content consultant.

He was Head of Content at Southern Cross Austereo's Triple M cap city & Regional Network from 2011 to 2021 and Head of Digital Sport from 2020 to 2021.

Prior to programming and management, he was a radio host and journalist. He anchored The Cage breakfast show on Triple M Melbourne, Sydney & Adelaide with James Brayshaw, Peter Berner, Brigitte Duclos and Matt Parkinson from January 2002 until November 2007.

He won Best Program Director at the Australian Commercial Radio Awards in 2015, Best Music Personality in 2008 and received the Brian White Award for Excellence in Radio Journalism in 1996.

His TV acting credits include Australian drama's Heartbreak High and G. P.. He has also appeared as the host of Video Cliches and Most Wanted for MTV Australia; appeared on Channel Ten's Joker Poker and Channel Nine's Hole in the Wall.
