= Seb Costello =

Australian journalist (born 1987)

- Born: Sebastian Costello
- Education: Carey Baptist Grammar School; RMIT University
- Occupations: Television and radio journalist
- Employer: Nine Network
- Family: Peter Costello (father); Tim Costello (uncle)

Sebastian Costello (born 1987) is an Australian television and radio journalist.

== Radio ==
=== Early radio work ===
Costello began his radio career at Melbourne community radio station SYN in 2007 while studying at RMIT University.

He then moved into commercial radio, working as an announcer at Max 107.3 in Taree on the Mid North Coast of New South Wales, and then at Classic Rock 102.5FM in Echuca on the New South Wales/Victoria border.

=== 3AW ===
Following his stint in Echuca, Costello moved back to Melbourne and began working for 3AW, firstly, as producer for Derryn Hinch's drive program, then as a producer and reporter for Neil Mitchell's breakfast program. He also became a boundary rider during the station's AFL broadcasts.

While working for 3AW in 2014, Costello was the subject of a homophobic comment made by veteran AFL commentator and former player Brian Taylor who said: "I don't want to offend his upbringing or his parents... but he looks gay."

=== Triple M ===
Costello moved from 3AW to Triple M in late 2014, where he became a news presenter on The Hot Breakfast.

Aside from reading the news at Triple M, Costello also continued working as an announcer, co-hosting The Summer Breakfast in late 2015 with Lawrence Mooney before hosting his own Saturday morning show, Weekend Breakfast from 2016 until he left the station in early 2017.

For his broadcast about Usain Bolt's triumph at the 2016 Summer Olympics, Costello won a Melbourne Press Club Quill Award in 2017 for Best Radio News. Costello's award marked the first time a Triple M staff member had ever won a Quill Award. Costello was also nominated in the Best Radio Current Affairs category for his coverage of Muhammad Ali's memorial service but lost to Richard Baker and Michael Bachelard from www.theage.com.au for their podcast Phoebe's Fall.

When Costello was appointed as the Nine Network's new Europe correspondent in 2017, he left Triple M.

However, in June 2018, it was announced Costello would be returning to Triple M, initially to co-host The Winter Breakfast during the mid-year ratings break, but then to resume his role as the news presenter on The Hot Breakfast.

In November 2020, Costello resigned from Triple M.

== Television ==
=== Nine Network ===
In December 2012, Costello became a Nine News reporter.

In March 2013, Costello apologised for laughing during a live cross. A member of the public had walked into shot, which caused an unexpected interaction between the person and a Nine crew member. But as the report was from the scene of a wall collapse in Carlton where two people had been killed, Costello felt it appropriate to apologise publicly and privately to the families of the victims.

In early 2017, the Nine Network announced Costello had been appointed as its new European correspondent, replacing Tom Steinfort.

Concerns were raised in 2018 about Costello's unexplained absence from Nine News after reportedly missing calls and being absent for a number of scheduled live crosses. The Nine Network said Costello was simply taking leave which was owing to him. Costello later revealed he had been suffering from a period of burnout after working around the clock to cover a large number of international stories for the network.

In 2019, Costello apologised for appearing to jostle with a Seven News reporter while the two journalists were working outside a Melbourne court, attempting to get a comment from a woman who had just been cleared of charges.

In October 2020, Costello joined A Current Affair as a reporter.

=== Nine's Wide World of Sports ===
In addition to news reporting, Costello also contributes to Nine's Wide World of Sports coverage, providing commentary for sporting events such as Suncorp Super Netball.

=== Twitter controversy ===
In September 2019, Costello was the subject of an allegedly offensive remark made on Twitter by Seven Network presenter Edwina Bartholomew.

It occurred after Nine News Melbourne posted a video on their Twitter account of Costello reporting from Melbourne's Parliament House where there had been a security scare. Bartholomew allegedly replied from her account to the video with an offensive remark about Costello. While Bartholomew deleted her tweet 50 minutes afterwards and apologised, the Nine Network threatened legal action.

A spokesperson for Nine said Costello and the network were "devastated and shocked at the damaging and false nature of this personal attack". The libellous nature of Bartholomew's tweet prevented the Australian media from repeating or republishing Bartholomew's comment in its entirety, with a specific word censored from the screenshots which were published.

Costello told his Triple M colleagues during The Hot Breakfast that what was said "wasn't ideal" and that he planned to discuss the issue with lawyers.

== Personal life ==
Costello is the son of former Treasurer of Australia and former chairman of Nine Entertainment Co., Peter Costello.

He is also the nephew of Baptist minister and World Vision Australia chief executive, Tim Costello.
