= Saturday Live =

Saturday Live can refer to:

- Saturday Live (Irish TV series), an Irish television talk show
- Saturday Live (UK TV series), a British television comedy series
- Saturday Live (radio series), a British radio series
- Saturday Live, a spin-off of Friday Live, an Australian short-run election series on Sky News Live

== See also ==
- Saturday Night Live, an American television comedy series
