= B Team =

The B Team is a non-profit organisation founded by Richard Branson and Jochen Zeitz to "make business work better".

The B Team may also refer to:

- The B Team (TV series), an Australian television comedy
- The B Team with Peter Berner, an Australian current affairs and commentary program on Sky News Live from 2016 to 2017
- The B-Team, a WWE tag team featuring Bo Dallas and Curtis Axel from 2017 to 2020
- Team B
- Reserve team, sports classification called "B team" or "B football" in some countries
- An archaic term for Junior varsity

== See also ==
- Category:National B association football teams
