= Anthony Lehmann =

Australian comedian

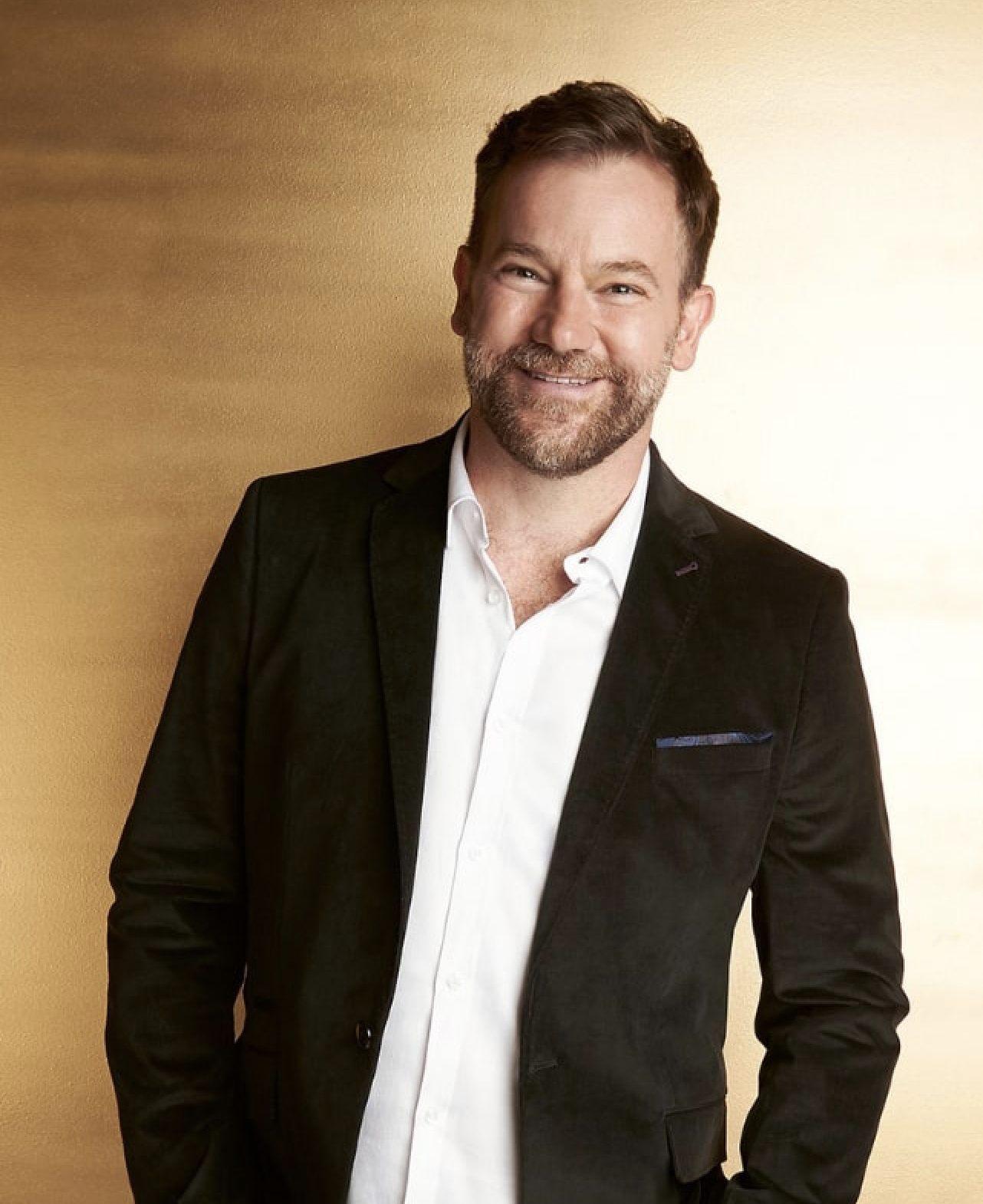
- Born: 20 August 1969 (age 57); Peebinga, South Australia
- Other name: Lehmo
- Occupations: Comedian, actor, television and radio presenter
- Years active: 1994−present
- Spouse: Kelly Kearney (m. 2014)
- Children: 1
- Website: www.lehmo.com.au

Anthony Lehmann (born 20 August 1969), professionally known as Lehmo, is an Australian comedian, actor, television and radio presenter.

== Career ==
Born in Peebinga, South Australia, Lehmann started out working as a chartered accountant before realising he did not actually like accounting and decided to give comedy a try.

=== Stand up ===
Lehmann is a well-travelled Australian comedian. His live work has seen him headline comedy clubs for over fifteen years and work in countries including USA, UK, Ireland, South Africa, Singapore, Malaysia, Hong Kong and Thailand.

Lehmann has also become Australia’s number one 'combat comic', having completed seven 'tours of duty' performing for Australian troops abroad. These tours have seen Lehmann perform in army bases in East Timor, Iraq, Kuwait, UAE, Afghanistan, Egypt, Qatar and on a number of naval ships around the world.

He has also performed sell out seasons at the Adelaide Fringe Festival (2000, 2002 and 2004), the Melbourne International Comedy Festival (1999, 2002, 2003, 2004 and 2005) and the Edinburgh Fringe Festival (1996 and 1997).

His live credits in the UK include the 1996 and 1997 Edinburgh Fringe Festivals, The Comedy Store, London and Jongleurs – the largest chain of comedy clubs in Britain. Lehmann has also performed regular gigs at the Boston Comedy Club and Gotham Comedy Club, both in New York City.

His shows have included, "War, Marriage & Puppy Love" – about war, marriage and puppy love, "The Family Lifeboat" – about navigating life as a new father, and "Younger Than Brad Pitt" – about Lehmann accepting he is no longer 21 and time is marching on.

Overseas demand for Lehmann has seen him appear on England's BBC Television's Comedy Showcase and as a regular compere on Britain's longest-running television stand up show Stand up Live. Lehmann also played himself in a series of ads for XXXX beer which were shot in India and screened in the UK.

In 2021, Lehmann accused RuPaul's Drag Race Down Under contestant Anita Wigl'it of stealing one of his jokes about Prince Andrew during her appearance as Elizabeth II in the show's Snatch Game challenge. Lehmann claimed he had first cracked the joke in August 2020 and that “my joke has now gone global without me.” Wigl'it later issued an apology on her Instagram, saying ““Oh no! I do apologise!! When I was doing research for the Queen character I knew that there was something funny about the letter writing[...]Friends suggested the text. Turns out they had heard it somewhere before!”

=== World record ===
In May 2005, Lehmann broke the Guinness World Record for the most jokes told in an hour with 549, beating the previous record of 499, which was held by UK comedian Tim Vine.

In April 2014, the record was reassigned back to Tim Vine following a decision from Guinness World Record officials. An official spokesman said that Anthony Lehmann had breached the guidelines.

=== Radio ===
==== SAFM ====
In 2003, Lehmann began his breakfast radio career at SAFM in Adelaide, co-hosting the station's breakfast show with Lisa “Milly” Millard. He remained with SAFM until 2007.

In July 2020, Lehmann returned to SAFM as co-host of Bec, Cosi & Lehmo alongside Rebecca Morse and Andrew “Cosi” Costello following the station's rebranding back to the SAFM name. The show concluded in October 2022, with Lehmo and Morse continuing until the end of the 2022 ratings year.

==== Mix 1011 & Gold 104.3 ====
In January 2010, Lehmann joined Brigitte Duclos on Mix 1011 to host Mix Mornings where he replaced Tom Gleeson. In December 2011, Australian Radio Network announced that Lehmann and Duclos would move to present Brig & Lehmo for Breakfast on Gold 104.3 replacing Grubby & Dee Dee. In November 2015, Duclos resigned from Gold 104.3 with Jo Stanley replacing her from January 2016. In November 2017, Lehmann's co-hosted the Jo & Lehmo Breakfast Show on Gold 104.3, which became the #1 breakfast show in Melbourne. The show was axed in December 2017 .

==== ABC Radio ====
In 2018, Lehmann joined ABC and hosted ABC Grandstand with Angela Pippos and Emma Race. He also hosted the summer sports ABC radio show, Grand National.

==== Triple M ====
In April 2007, Lehmann joined Triple M to co-host drive-time program Wil & Lehmo which also starred fellow comedian co-host Wil Anderson. The show ended in November 2008. Lehmann has since been a regular contributor on the Triple M network.

=== Television ===
The former accountant is no stranger to TV, playing series regular 'Jim' in ABC TV's Utopia, which has won several awards including Best Television Comedy Series at the 4th AACTA Awards, Equity Award for Most Outstanding Performance by an Ensemble in a Comedy Series at the Equity Ensemble Awards, and Most Outstanding Comedy Program at the Logies. He has been seen regularly on Network Ten's Celebrity Name Game, The Project, Have You Been Paying Attention? and featured in roles on It's A Date, Please Like Me, Neighbours (as himself). Lehmann was a team captain on Fox Footy's AFL-themed quiz show The Beep Test, and had guest roles on Drunk History Australia, Hughesy, We Have A Problem, A League Of Their Own, Can Of Worms, Good News Week, Rove Live, The Circle, The Glass House, Hey Hey It's Saturday and Stand Up Live (UK TV). Lehmann was also a core cast member of the much loved Before The Game for over 6 years on TEN.

Lehmann hosted the ABC’s coverage of the 2018 Invictus Games. That year, he co-hosted the ABC’s live broadcast of the 2019 Australian of the Year announcement as well as Channel 9’s Footy Show.

In 2024 Lehmo appeared in “The Big Trip” on Channel 7 where celebrity contestants travelled from Adelaide to Sydney in all electric cars completing challenges en route. In 2025 he appeared as a contestant on Claire Hooper's House Of Games.

=== Film ===
In 2009 Lehmann played a cameo role in the Australian movie Offside. He appears as the character 'Leechy', a former Junior Socceroo, a soccer star – a role he says is not at odds with his public identity as an active supporter of Aussie Rules football club Hawthorn.

In order to play the role of Leechy, Lehmann flew to Adelaide for six hours on 6 February 2008. Once shooting was completed, he broadcast his afternoon drive-time radio show from a sister Adelaide radio station, before flying back to Sydney.

In 2010, Lehmann was developing another script with writer/director Carlo Petraccaro.

Lehmann has also had cameos the Working Dog film Any Questions For Ben? and comedy That’s Not My Dog!

=== Other work ===
In 2007, he was the face of the advertising campaigns for the Australian International Motor Show held in Sydney. He was also the face of adverts for the then new Vegemite spread iSnack 2.0 which commenced airing on 21 September 2009 and during the 2009 AFL Grand Final broadcast.

== Personal life ==
In December 2013, Lehmann announced his engagement to television producer Kelly Kearney while on holiday in South Africa. They married on 29 December 2014 in Bali. Their first child, a boy, was born on 26 July 2016.
