= The Shebang =

Australian radio show

- Genre: Comedy, breakfast
- Running time: 180 minutes
- Country of origin: Australia
- Language: English
- Home station: Triple M Sydney
- Starring: Marty Sheargold; Fifi Box; Paul Murray (2008); Anthony Maroon (anchor)
- Original release: 2003 – 31 October 2008
- Audio format: FM stereo

The Shebang was a radio show broadcast weekday mornings from 6 am to 9 am AEST in Sydney, Australia, on Triple M. It was hosted by Marty Sheargold, Fifi Box with Anthony Maroon as the show anchor. The producer, Anna, was often chastised for her many mistakes.

The show mainly worked around observational humour, derived from various media sources.

Formerly Triple M's main syndicated drive-time show, Austereo announced on 14 December 2006 that The Shebang would move to the breakfast shift for Triple M Sydney in 2007. The Shebang commenced the breakfast shift in Sydney on 29 January 2007.

On 6 August 2008, Triple M announced that The Shebang would not be continuing in 2009 as host Fifi Box was leaving the station to appear on the Seven Network's Sunrise program, while Marty Sheargold said he would not continue at Triple M once the show finished. Unbeknown to anyone listening, without any warning, The Shebang cast announced their last show on Friday 31 October 2008. Insiders report that there has been a bitter rift between Sheargold and Murray since the ratings dive of the show after Murray's arrival in 2008. It is believed this could have a link to Sheargold's disappearance for an extended amount of time from the show.

== History ==
The program began in 2003 as The Whole Shebang, a drive program on Triple M Melbourne, with a cast of comedians and celebrities. Following a shakeup of programming at the station in mid-2003, the program extended to be broadcast in Sydney as well, with the cast being Mikey Robins, Fifi Box, Marty Sheargold, Jodie J. Hill and Jo Stanley. The Whole Shebang was nominated for the Award for Outstanding Radio Comedy Performance in the 2003 Comedy Awards (Radio). By the end of 2003, Robbins, Hill and Stanley had left, leaving Box and Sheargold. At the start of 2004, the show was further extended to Brisbane and Adelaide, although later dropped from Adelaide following poor ratings.

In 2007, The Shebang moved to a breakfast slot for Triple M Sydney only. Also in 2007, The Shebang had a float in the Sydney Gay & Lesbian Mardi Gras.

== Regular guests ==
- Glenn Robbins
- Mark Beretta
- Liz Ellis
- Tom Gleisner
- Tony Martin
- Former regulars and other (occasional) guests include Lawrence Mooney, Scott Cam, Andrew Denton, Stephen Curry, Tim Smith, Richard Marsland, Peter Rowsthorn, Johanna Griggs, David Koch, Steve Richards and Colin Lane.

== Audience and ratings ==
In the breakfast radio ratings for April 2007, The Shebang only managed a 5.3 percent share of the breakfast audience (tied with 2CH in eighth place) in the Nielsen ratings survey, a loss of 47,000 listeners since March. In the breakfast radio ratings for August 2007, The Shebang's ratings climbed 0.3 to 8.6 percent share of the breakfast audience in the Sydney market making The Shebang seventh overall and fourth in the FM market. In May 2008 - Triple M's breakfast show was not going down well, with co-hosts Marty Sheargold and Fifi Box both believed to have threatened to walk over the program's ratings dive. Sheargold reportedly clashed with new addition Paul Murray and Box after the show registered its worst result (down 1.5 percentage points to 5). The gloomy news was compounded after Triple M was beaten by easy listening station 2CH. "It's a train wreck in here today," a Confidential source claimed. "Everyone is blaming everyone." An Austereo spokeswoman denied "any drama" stating, "there's three of them and that's just how it is. No one's going anywhere."

A Daily Telegraph article had suggested that former husband of Jackie O, Phil O'Niell may be taking over the Sydney breakfast slot. This would put him in direct competition with his former partner, in the same market, and in the same company as 2Day FM, as both networks are owned by Austereo.

In a Nielsen survey, The Shebang audience share fell by 1.5 points to 5 percent. Another Nielsen Survey report had shown that , The Shebang had fallen another 0.5 points to 4.5 percent market share in the 6-9am time slot.

The Sydney Morning Herald reported on 29 October 2008 that Triple M Sydney and The Shebang had received the wooden spoon in the latest Nielsen Media survey. Separate to this co-host Marty Sheargold, who took leave four weeks ago for the birth of his first child had not returned and fill-in comedian co-hosts have been used, including Tony Moclair and Justin Hamilton.

== Content ==
=== Content changes ===
As the show moved shifts, several segments were omitted. These include Backyard Riffs, Captain Obvious (after Fifi confessed on air that she disliked the segment) and Paul Calija's History Lesson. Also, many regular guests did not appear in 2007 such as Cal Wilson and Steve Richards. Mark Beretta, however, remained. Segments that were kept from 2006 include Amazing Facts, Dog Whisperers (renamed "Thank Dog You're Here") and Shebanging the World.

There was some controversy surrounding the segment "Thank Dog You're Here" as one of the program directors David Rymer wanted to get rid of it, calling it "beige". After much argument and calls/emails from listeners a compromise was reached and it was restricted to Friday Fun Ones. Rymer was since dubbed "Master Beige" or "The Beigenator".

=== Celebrity interviews ===
The pair have interviewed the likes of Ricky Ponting, Paul Stanley, Jennifer Aniston, Kiernan from Augie March, Bill Gates, Will Ferrell, Prime Minister of Australia, John Howard, and Matt Damon.

=== Friday Fun Ones ===
As the name suggests, 'Friday Fun Ones' occur every Friday. It is usually accompanied with loose, 'fun' attitudes, Captain Obvious and as of 2006, a new sound effect every week. Often, there is a 'Friday Fun One Acoustic', where a singer or a band would come in and perform an acoustic version of one of their songs. The format of Friday Fun Ones changed after the time slot change. The sound effect was scrapped and Captain Obvious was replaced by Thank Dog You're Here.

=== Missed Opportunity ===
The "Missed Opportunity Podcast" is an exclusive podcast that contains stuff that didn't make it to air and is done every weekend. Marty is known to be extremely reluctant in doing these as he dislikes the extra work. It can be accessed through the usual podcast feed or streamed from the website.

=== Segments ===
- Captain Obvious: This is a segment where callers talk about hearing or seeing something that's just plain obvious, such as the classic "Mixed nuts may contain traces of nuts".
- Cart It Up: is a segment introduced in 2007 which replays the mistakes that Fifi, Marty or Drew have picked up on over the course of the show. The concept is if whoever is talking at the time mispronounces a word or has trouble saying a word, either the co-anchor or themselves say "Cart It Up" to add it to the end-of-show replay segment. Fifi is known for dominating the segment.
- Thank Dog You're Here: This is a segment in which Fifi and Marty take calls from listeners, and try to guess what breed of dog they have, based on their bark. The title is taken from a comedy show, Thank God You're Here, on which Fifi is a regular guest.
- Age of Reason: In this segment, Marty and Fifi try to guess the age of particular public figures. There are also the spin-off segments "Height of Reason", "Weight of Reason" and "Shoe Size of Reason".
- Amazing Facts: One of the few original segments carried over from the drive shift. Listeners ring up with a piece of trivia (an "amazing fact"). The only rule of the segment is that a caller must say the word "Fact" before telling their fact.
- Car Idiosyncrasies: This is where listeners ring up and tell of their "car idiosyncrasies", which are odd habits of their cars. One example is if one's windscreen wipers only worked if the radio was on.
- Fatima Files: Listeners ring up with their supernatural or "other worldly" experiences.
- Fifi's Diary: A new segment where Fifi reads out entries from her old diary that she kept when she was a child.
- Getting to Know You: With Julie Andrews in the opening song, Marty comically tells the listeners about various childhood experiences.
- Ponder This: Marty gives Fifi a conundrum to try to solve such as "Which came first, the chicken or the egg?". If he likes Fifi's answer, he says "Well pondered" and they move on.
- Riddle Me This: Marty and Fifi attempt to solve some riddles but the segment was axed after complaints that it was boring.
- Rulebook: Marty and Fifi identify a facet of life, such as wearing tracksuit pants, and listeners call up with their rules about it.
- Shebanging the World: Listeners take a photo with a Shebang sign in other countries and email them through, which Marty and Fifi read out and put on the website. This is done in an attempt to get a photo from every country in the world.
- Six Billion to One: Listeners call with their stories about unbelievable coincidences. The title is based on the premise that there are approximately six billion people in the world. After several years, Fifi still cannot sing the segment's song correctly.
- Sucked in robbers: Listeners call with their stories about when they have been robbed, but the robbers didn't get what they were expecting, such as: the person didn't have any money in their wallet, or the car that was stolen had no petrol, etc.
- Wake Up Call: Marty and Fifi gives someone an early start to their day.

== Changes ==
Throughout 2006, there were rumours that The Shebang would be moved to the breakfast shift, replacing struggling breakfast show The Cage in the Sydney and Melbourne markets. This was all but confirmed in a report in the Daily Telegraph on 3 November 2006, which suggested the move would be announced shortly for 2007, and would make Box one of the highest-earning women in radio.

It was reported on 29 November 2006 in the Herald Sun, that Fifi and Marty had recently filmed a pilot of The Shebang chat show concept called The Late Night Little Big Show with comedians Glenn Robbins and Tony Martin. The article makes reference also that Nine Network has given it the thumbs-down, but Seven Network is considering it. Also the article mentions that the negotiations between The Shebang and The Cage shows and time slots are still in progress and nothing is confirmed at this stage.

In an article, Fifi Box is understood to have signed a new contract worth $500,000 a year, making her one of the highest paid women on the air.

Austereo had announced on 14 December that The Shebang would move to the morning shift for Triple M Sydney in 2007. Wil Anderson has taken over the drive-time shift as of 2 April 2007 with the show Wil & Lehmo airing from 4pm to 6pm Monday to Friday. (After 2 years and poor ratings Wil and Lehmo were replaced by Roy & HG of Triple J fame at the start of 2009) At the end of 2007, it was announced that Paul Murray would be joining The Shebang in 2008 in a bid to lift soft ratings. The addition of Paul Murray came with a more "newsy" approach. Ironically, The Shebang's ratings plummeted with the addition of Paul Murray.

In 2008, Triple M's Anthony Maroon replaced Drew (who was then put on the morning shift) as anchor. The reason for this is unknown.

Without any promotion or in any way letting the listeners to The Shebang know, Friday 31 October 2008 brought about the final edition of The Shebang. It was sprung without warning, with Fifi Box and Paul Murray left to say goodbye without the presence of Marty Sheargold.

The Shebang Podcast was removed from iTunes on 1 November, with the last seven shows not being available for download.
