= Triple M Melbourne =

Triple M Melbourne (3MMM)
- Melbourne, Victoria; Australia
- Frequency: 105.1 MHz FM
- Branding: Triple M

Programming
- Language: English
- Format: Active rock
- Affiliations: Triple M

Ownership
- Owner: Southern Cross Austereo
- Sister stations: Fox FM

History
- First air date: 11 July 1980 (as 3EON); 27 November 1988 (as 3MMM)
- Former call signs: 3EON (1980–1988)
- Former frequencies: 92.3 MHz FM (1980–1988)

Technical information
- ERP: 56 kW
- Transmitter coordinates: 37.8389°S 145.3453°E

Links
- Website: www.triplem.com.au/melbourne

Triple M Melbourne (callsign 3MMM) is a radio station broadcasting in Melbourne, Victoria, Australia. Its target demographic is the 18-54 age group. Triple M Melbourne is part of Southern Cross Austereo's Triple M Network and broadcasts on the 105.1 MHz frequency.

The station was Australia's first commercial FM station, originally known as Eon FM, broadcasting on 92.3 MHz.

== Station history ==
=== Eon FM: The Birth of Commercial FM Radio ===
In late 1979, a consortium, members of which included recording entrepreneur Bill Armstrong, band manager Glenn Wheatley and stockbroker Bill Conn, successfully bid on one of two Melbourne FM licenses and set about creating a commercial FM radio station. Armstrong headed the consortium, having seen the commercial opportunities of FM radio in the US and the UK.

Despite what their license application read, they had no blueprint at all with regard to marketing, programming, administration or promotion. The next six months was then spent building a radio station from scratch. A makeshift studio was set up in Bank Street, South Melbourne, draped with hessian to deaden the noise. Late-night dummy runs were performed a week before the on-air date to test the equipment.

On 11 July 1980, Australia's first commercial FM radio station, Eon FM, began broadcasting on 92.3 MHz, beating Fox FM to the title by two weeks. Peter Grace, formerly a DJ for 3XY) was the first voice heard on the station; he later said he was given that late night spot by default. "It's one past midnight and this is 92.3, E-O-N FM, I'm Peter Grace and this is the beginning of a long, long time..." The first song was "New Kid in Town" by The Eagles.

Armstrong was the first managing director; Clyde Simpson, the first general manager; Lee Simon, also ex-3XY, the first program director; Billy Pinnell, first music programmer – all names to circulate the Australian music industry for years. Other announcers included Mike Nicholls, Karl Van Est, Joe Miller, John Peters, Andy McLean, Jan Cannon, Paul Cashmere, Kenny The Paper-Boy, Kent Forbes, John Hood, Gavin Wood, Trish Mulholand, Craig Huggins and Mark Irvine. Newsreader Jennifer Keyte also began her career as a cadet at Eon FM.

At first, Eon FM played songs that "would not be played elsewhere", having no playlist and avoiding Top 40 songs. Said Armstrong, "we thought we were going to be the beginning of a new era. It took us a while to realise we were wrong."

Eon FM performed better than the other non-commercial FM stations, but was easily beaten by the AM stations. Management was worried, and shareholders were asked to invest another $1 million between them only a year after the station was launched.

Programme Director Lee Simon then went against the flow of the album rock formats favoured by Australia's FM stations and radically changed Eon's format by playing Top 40 hits and staging outdoor concerts. Molly Meldrum, host of Countdown, was even invited to do a regular breakfast spot with Gavin Wood, the voice-over man of Countdown. Gavin and Molly's partnership included a segment of their own version of the crime fighters "Batman and Robin". They even appeared in the Moomba procession as the crime fighting duo in the Batmobile. The combination of Gavin and Molly proved to be a ratings winner when finally in 1985, Eon FM topped Melbourne's ratings. Ken Gibson was the stations first Advertising and Marketing Manager.

In early 1986, 3EON FM was sold to Triple M for $37.5 million. The deal was reportedly negotiated by Wheatley, who subsequently became the managing director of Hoyts Media. The station was rebranded Triple M on 27 November 1988, and was moved to the current frequency.

=== Triple M Melbourne ===
In 1987, a new style of breakfast show had begun taking shape on Triple M featuring a team of comedians known as The D-Generation. With a successful sketch show on ABC TV behind them and initially hired in 1986 by Lee Simon to write comedy pieces for The John Peters Breakfast Show, the team of Tom Gleisner (1986–92), Santo Cilauro (1986–92), Rob Sitch (1986, 1989–91), Tony Martin (1987–91), Michael Veitch (1987–89), Mick Molloy (1990–92), and Jason Stephens (1990–92), successfully took over the breakfast air waves; even recruiting a member of the news team, Jane Kennedy (1988–92). Marg Downey, Magda Szubanski and Judith Lucy also had small stints on the show. The show had a number of anchors during its run, notably Ian Rogerson (1987), Peter O’Callaghan (1988) and Kevin Hillier (1990–92), but it is the sixteen month 'anchorless' period (September 88-December 89) that is best-remembered by fans.

The show had a popular mix of sketches, characters and clever comedy, producing a number of best-of CDs.

In September 1990, Triple M moved from the original South Melbourne premises to the 8th Floor, 140 Bourke Street in the Melbourne central business district.

The on-air line-up in 1991 consisted of:

| Time | Show name |
|---|---|
| 6:00 am – 9:00 am | Kevin Hillier and The D-Generation |
| 9:00 am – 12:00 pm | Richard Stubbs |
| 12:00 pm – 3:00 pm | Mark Irvine |
| 3:00 pm – 6:00 pm | Rob Elliott |
| 6:00 pm – 10:00 pm | John Peters |

Station Floater: Craig Huggins

In late 1991, the D-Generation team successfully pitched The Late Show (1992–1993) to ABC TV. Sitch and Martin immediately left the radio show to prepare, with the rest of the team following in April to star in it.

Richard Stubbs, another ex-3XY DJ, moved from the morning slot to the newly vacated breakfast position. Tim Smith and then Brigitte Duclos, who, like Jane Kennedy earlier, began working at the station as a newsreader, joined him to form The Richard Stubbs Breakfast Show. Saturday nights hosted Live from the Ivy, a dance music program hosted live from the Ivy Club in Melbourne.

=== Joining Austereo ===
In 1994, the Triple M network, owned by Hoyts, was sold to Village Roadshow, who, on 1 December 1994, sold the network to Austereo, owner of the Today Network, in return for a 53.5% share of Austereo. This gave Austereo, and therefore Village Roadshow, control of two national networks.

The merger of two formerly competing radio stations created some rivalries in each of the capital cities. In Melbourne, it was rumoured that Richard Stubbs received some flack for spending time in the Fox FM offices with his brother, announcer Peter Stubbs, better known as Grubby, who was co-hosting a breakfast show on Fox FM at the time). However, over the years the two stations have regularly swapped stars between themselves when an existing role hasn't suited.

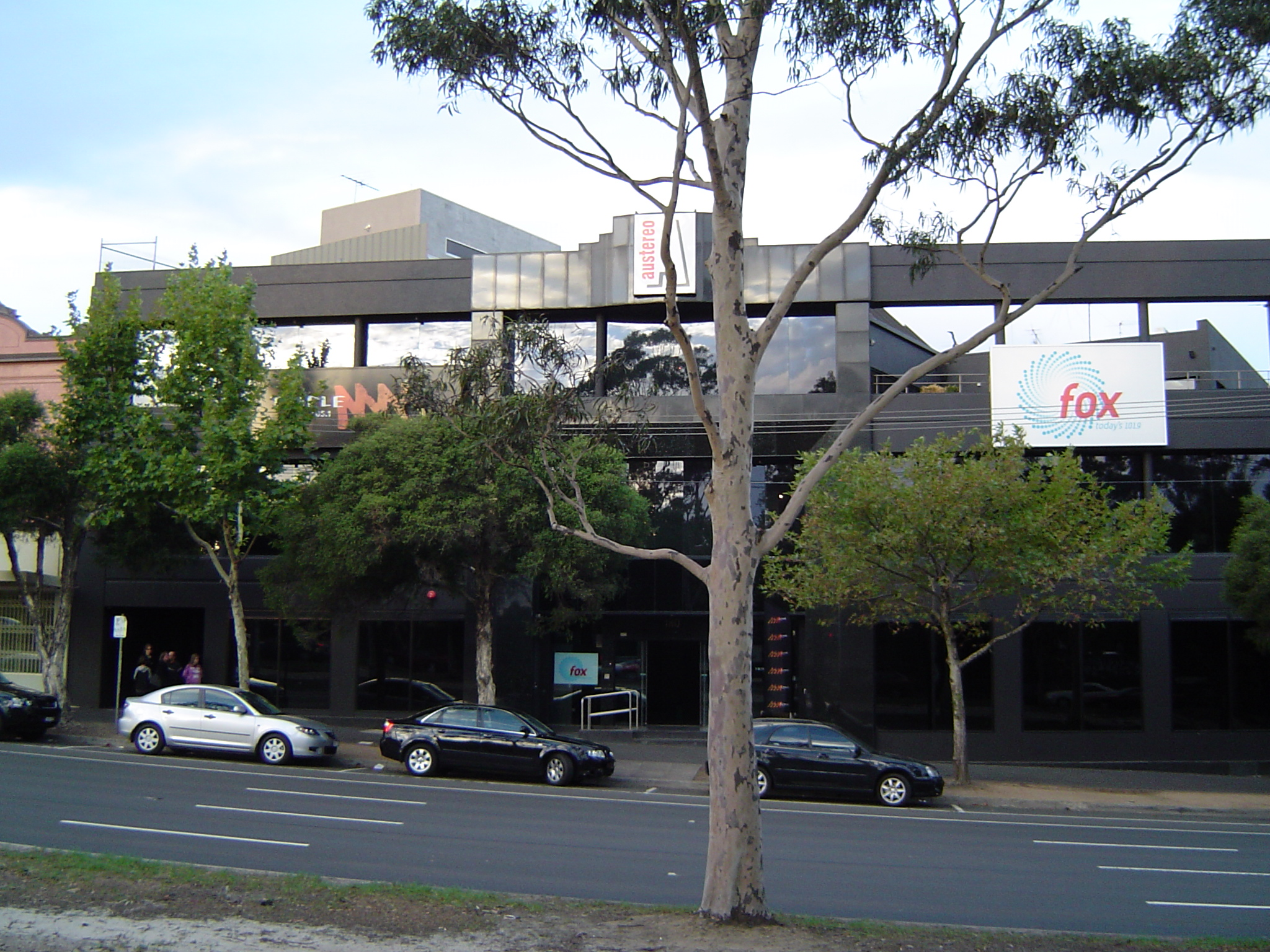
Former Triple M Building (1996–2008) on St Kilda Road

In 1996, Triple M moved from its home in central Melbourne to the first Floor of the Fox FM building at 180 St Kilda Road, St Kilda. Triple M continues to share resources with its sister station, such as the traffic reports.

Meanwhile, The Richard Stubbs Breakfast Show continued to deliver a strong performance for Triple M Melbourne. In 1995, an attempt was made to network the show in Sydney, but it ultimately failed, being replaced by a local team in Sydney headed by Andrew Denton.

At the start of 1996, Tim Smith left the breakfast show to join forces with Steve Bedwell in a morning show called The Squirrel Grippers, while Duclos moved to drive for The Grill Team, a reworking of the original Grill Team format pioneered by Triple M Melbourne in the early 1990s, merging sport, comedy and music – a formula to filter throughout the station. The Grill Team also included ex-footballer Dermott Brereton and future Channel 9 CEO Eddie McGuire.

On breakfast, Richard Stubbs continued with two new team members until the end of 1997, when he retired from radio, much to Triple M's disappointment. (He did, however, return to radio in later years with other networks).

The Squirrel Grippers were chosen as Stubb's replacement, moving from the mornings to breakfast. Renaming themselves as Timbo & Bedders for Breakfast, they continued Stubbs' success from 1998 to 2001.

After The Grill Team departed from the drive slot, Triple M moved the eccentric show Crud with Tony Moclair and Julian Schiller, which began life on community station 3RRR, from the evening slot into drive. Crud became best known for the character of Guido Hatzis, a self-confessed 'adonis' of ethnic descent who would call people with the intention of stirring them up. (A common radio theme)

Triple M tested the concept of FM talkback in 1999 with The Spoonman adding his controversial opinion every weeknight. The program was shelved at the end of the year, but returned in 2005 in almost exactly the same format.

At the start of 2002, seemingly to capitalise on Smith and Bedwell's success, the station moved Smith to the drive slot (following Cruds departure) to create a new show The Cage with previous colleague Brigitte Duclos, leaving Bedwell to head a new breakfast team. Called The Morning Madhouse, it included former Big Brother contestant Rachel Corbett, with ex-cricketer James Brayshaw featuring as a sports reporter. It was a ratings failure.

The Cage involved a revolving door of guests and comedians including Matt Parkinson (Parko), Matt Quartermaine (Quarters) (who together were the Empty Pockets comedy duo) Trevor Marmalade and Russell Gilbert. The show performed well and was moved to the vacant breakfast slot only 3 months after it began. A relay of the breakfast show, with about 20% new content, kept the drive slot warm for the following few months. James Brayshaw remained at breakfast and eventually joined The Cage full-time, which at the same time lost Marmalade and Gilbert.

Triple M eventually decided in July 2002 to concentrate The Cage on breakfast only, and filled the drive slot for next 13 months with a couple of one-announcer shows.

Also in 2002, James 'Turbo' Anderson joined the daytime lineup, promoted from the midnight – dawn position. At the age of 21, 'Turbo' was the youngest announcer in the country at the time to be given a prime time shift in a major metropolitan market. He continued with the network through until 2005, leaving his mark with the number one position across Melbourne in the afternoons time slot with a 13.8 share of the market.

Following the success of outdoor concerts such as Big Day Out and Rumba, Triple M ran their own full-day concert, called M-One. It featured Garbage, Billy Idol, Goo Goo Dolls, Midnight Oil and Nickelback. In Melbourne, it was held at Docklands Stadium) on Saturday 12 October 2002. It was moderately successful, but didn't sell as many tickets as expected. It was therefore seen as a financial failure and not run again.

=== Networked radio ===
While Triple M Melbourne's line-up was proving successful during 2003, the Sydney station was in a ratings dive, partly due to the popularity of a then-new competitor, Nova.

In August 2003, Triple M again tried networking Melbourne's successful breakfast show in Sydney, with The Cage gaining former Sydney breakfast member Peter Berner to ease in the new market. (Matt Quartermaine had departed a few months earlier). Slowly, but surely, Sydney began to accept the new show, which featured local breaks for traffic and news. (Brisbane also has a breakfast show called The Cage, but it is in name only and comprises a different team.)

At the same time a fresh new show began in the drive slot – The Whole Shebang. It starred comedians Marty Sheargold, Jo Stanley and Jodie J. Hill with Fifi Box and Byron Cooke, plus another Sydney breakfast show ex-member, Mikey Robins. The show was initially broadcast into both Sydney and Melbourne, with Brisbane added later and Adelaide receiving it for a brief time.

Triple M also began a new frequent listener's initiative in August 2003 with the Freq Club. It involved listening for code words, which could be accumulated and redeemed for prizes.

At the end of 2003, Matt Parkinson left The Cage to pursue other interests, and The Whole Shebang dropped most of the team (and the 'Whole' part), leaving Sheargold and Box as a duo, with Cooke as anchor (Cooke later moved to the US, to be replaced by Rohan "Brownie" Brown, a morning announcer). Parkinson eventually rejoined The Cage in 2005 when Tim Smith left to try other things at Triple M, before eventually leaving the station after almost 14 years there. (He later moved to rival station Mix 101.1 to host breakfast with Tracy Bartram 3 months later)

In 2004, Mick Molloy returned to Triple M with Tough Love from 10:00 am to 12:00 pm. He was joined by Robyn Butler, Alan Brough and Richard Molloy (aka "Roo"). Alan left the show at the end of 2004 and it shifted to 12:00 pm – 1:00 pm, presumably to allow Molloy to work on other projects. At the end of 2006, Molloy ended the show, sarcastically saying "The relentless grind of a one-hour national radio show has finally taken its toll. The midday starts were also brutal, often playing havoc with my sleeping patterns."

Molloy's sparring partner Tony Martin also re-joined the station in 2006 with Get This. The show was co-hosted by Ed Kavalee with a different guest each day. During 2006, the show ran from 09:00 am – 10:00 am weekdays, moving to 11:00 am – 1:00 pm and then 2:00 pm in 2007.

At the end of 2006, Triple M confirmed that The Shebang would be moved to breakfast in Sydney, while The Cage would focus solely on Melbourne, ending the breakfast networking experiment again. Chas and Dom from The Chaser filled the drive slot during the summer break, with Wil & Lehmo moving in permanently from 2 April 2007, broadcasting to all Triple M stations.

The Freq Club was eventually ended in 2005, replaced with a 'Music Jury' in 2006, where anyone can sign-up and are then sent, on a weekly basis, a survey of 30 songs which are judged by how liked it is and how tired you are of it.

In 2005, Triple M's slogan became "You’ll Never Know What We’ll Play Next". Coupled with this was the suggestion that the music director was a monkey called Barry, and featured an ad campaign where on-air talent were subjected to his mood. By the end of 2006, the Barry aspect featured less in the station IDs. Since that time, it was jokingly mentioned on Get This that 'the monkey is not to be mentioned'.

Starting from 29 January 2007, Triple M began using a new slogan, "At Least We Take The Music Seriously"; however this has been slowly reverted to "You'll Never Know What We'll Play Next".

From 17 September 2007, Get This was moved to the 2-4pm slot – the third move since the program started. The reason was to provide one long stream of talk: from 2pm when Get This starts, until 6pm when Wil and Lehmo finishes. On 15 October 2007, Tony Martin revealed to listeners that "Get This" would be axed at the end of November. This has caused many listeners to voice their unhappy opinions in TV/Radio guides (such as The Age's Green Guide), on petitions. The last show was broadcast on 23 November 2007.

The Cage was also axed at the end of 2007, shortly after member James Brayshaw announced he was leaving. "The Cage had run its cycle in Melbourne," according to Austereo's group programme director Guy Dobson. "It's all a fiscal decision. Nothing is done lightly and nothing is done with malice." The Cage ended on 22 November 2007 after five years, with the Essential 2007 Countdown filling for the usual Friday show.

=== Recent history ===
In December 2007, Triple M revived the slogan "Home of Rock, Sport and Comedy", previously used in the late 1990s, which announcers and advertisements used instead of "You'll Never Know What We'll Play Next".

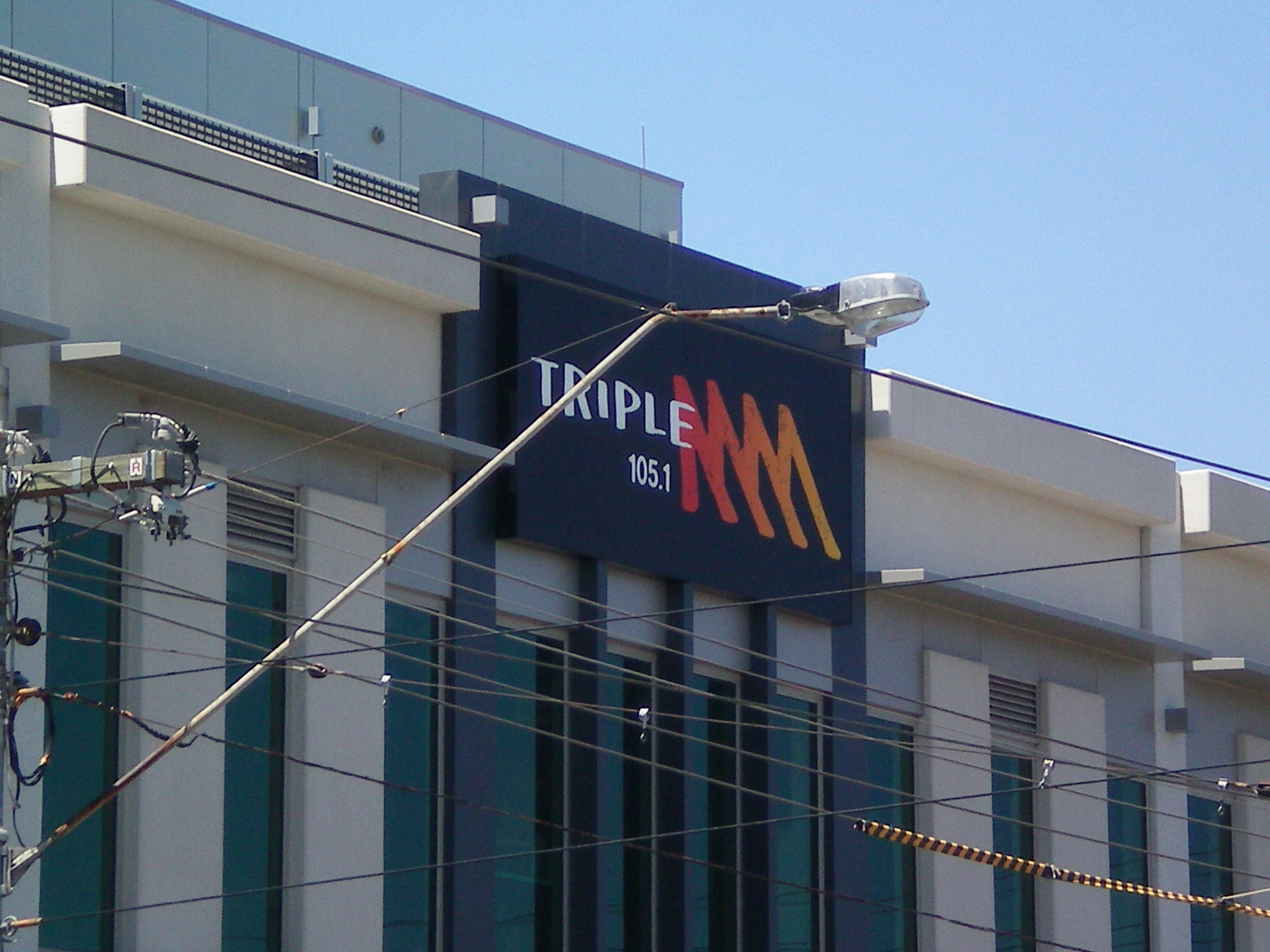
Triple M Building signage (2008–2022), Clarendon Street, South Melbourne

Triple M announced that Peter Helliar had been chosen to lead a new breakfast show in Melbourne in 2008, joined by Myf Warhurst. Pete & Myf began 21 January 2008, with the late Richard Marsland (previously on Get This) joining as anchor from 29 January 2008.

On 11 July 2008, Triple M celebrated their 28th birthday, playing many of the original EON FM jingles throughout the day, with Lee Simon, Peter Grace, Karl Van Est and Jennifer Keyte reminiscing from 12:00 pm to 2:00 pm. During that time, Keyte reprised her role as a news presenter.

In September 2008, Triple M Melbourne re-located from its St Kilda Road studios, to brand new upgraded studios in South Melbourne. In early 2009, the building was named the Richard Marsland Studios, in honour of the popular panel operator and on-air presenter who had taken his own life in December 2008.

At the end of 2008, Wil & Lehmo finished their drive-time show, which was replaced by Roy and HG (Monday and Friday) and local announcers (Tuesday-Thursday).

On Tuesday 7 July 2009, due to low ratings, the station announced that Peter Helliar and Myf Warhurst's breakfast show had been axed, with the last show aired on Friday 31 July.

On 7 September 2009, the new breakfast show, The Hot Breakfast with Eddie McGuire, Luke Darcy and Mieke Buchan commenced broadcasting. Comedian Mick Molloy eventually replaced Buchan and remained on the show until 2017, when he transitioned to a national drive time show, Kennedy and Molloy with Jane Kennedy, with Wil Anderson taking Molloy's place.

In May 2021, Southern Cross Austereo announced that the station with sister station Fox FM would re-locate to 101 Moray Street, South Melbourne from mid-2022 after signing a 10-year lease. The move was completed in June 2022 with the network taking up approximately 3,000sqm on the second floor of the state-of-the-art commercial building.

== Sports coverage ==
In 1992, Eddie McGuire was given the green light and the Saturday morning timeslot to launch The Grill Team, a groundbreaking 3-hour sport show which also featured Jane Kennedy and comedians Trevor Marmalade, Tim Smith, Matt Quartermaine and Sergio Paradise. The Grill Team rapidly gained momentum and ratings with its unique blend of Rock, Sport and Comedy, a format which was rolled out across the entire station in the ensuing years.

The introduction of The Grill Team on Triple M Melbourne in the early 90s is considered by many industry insiders to be the precursor to Channel 9's long running AFL The Footy Show which debuted in 1994 with Eddie McGuire, Trevor Marmalade and former Geelong great, John "Sammy" Newman.

The success of the Saturday morning Grill Team led to the introduction of even more sport based programming on Triple M including The World According to Pig, Jimmy and Rooboy with AFL legends Jason Dunstall, James Hird and Wayne Carey, Dougy and Dunstall, and more recently, The Gospel and Dead Set Legends.

In 1995, Programme Director, Lee Simon noted that Triple M's ratings were dropping off over the weekends in increasing numbers. Most of Triple M's audience were watching or listening to football. (known as footy or AFL)

Simon suggested that Triple M broadcast football on weekends. Triple M's board initially resisted, but Simon was persistent. 3MMM finally won broadcast approval in 1997, and has since become the top-rating AFL broadcaster.

Triple M began using the slogan "Rock, Sport and Comedy" on the back of the gaining of the football rights, until early 2000.

In October 2006, Triple M was granted AFL broadcast rights for a further 3 years.

== Transmission ==
3MMM transmits from the ATV transmission tower on top of Mount Dandenong. It is an NEC FBN-11K10E FM transmitter with a base power of 6 kW.

== Digital radio ==
Triple M is simulcast on digital radio in Melbourne.

Triple M launched High Voltage Radio, a "pop up" Digital Radio station that exclusively plays AC/DC for the duration of the band's 2010 tour of Australia. High Voltage ceased transmission on 15 March 2010.
