= Marty Sheargold Show =

Australian breakfast radio show

The Marty Sheargold Show
- Genre: Comedy
- Running time: 60 minutes (3:00 pm – 4:00 pm)
- Country of origin: Australia
- Language: English
- Home station: Triple M Melbourne
- Syndicates: Triple M Network
- Starring: Marty Sheargold
- Announcer: Troy Ellis
- Executive producer: Matt Thomson
- Recording studio: Melbourne, Australia
- Original release: 18 January 2021 – 25 February 2025
- Audio format: Stereophonic sound
- Podcast: play.listnr.com/podcast/marty-sheargold-show?referrer=triplem

The Marty Sheargold Show was an Australian radio show on Triple M. The show was hosted by Marty Sheargold with anchor Troy Ellis, producers Will Ralston and Loren Barry and executive producer Matt Thomson.

Founded as a breakfast show on Triple M Melbourne in 2021, it also featured an hour long packaged highlights show that aired nationally 3–4pm.

== History ==
In November 2020, Southern Cross Austereo announced that The Marty Sheargold Show would replace The Hot Breakfast in 2021 after Eddie McGuire and Luke Darcy decided to end the show at the end of 2020 after 11 years. Sheargold was part of Nova's national drive show, Kate, Tim & Marty until September 2020 when he departed the show.

In July 2024 Sheargold announced he would be stepping down from the breakfast shift due to his stand-up comedy and TV commitments. The show continued in the afternoon slot between 3-4pm as a pre-recorded show. In November of the same year, it was announced that the show would be expanded to the 3-6pm drive slot on New South Wales and Queensland stations including Triple M Sydney and Triple M Brisbane. The first hour (3-4pm) of the show would remain on-air nationally with the southern states (VIC, TAS, SA and WA) switching to The Rush Hour with JB and Billy from 4pm. It meant he would take on his former Nova show now called Ricki-Lee, Tim & Joel in the northern markets.

Before the end of 2024, producer Loren Barry left the show suddenly but was later announced by SCA and on-air by Sheargold to be working on a new project within SCA. She went on to host The Hot Hits on SCA's Hit Network in 2025.

The daily podcast featured extra exclusive content not heard during the radio show that mainly centred around listener feedback. For the duration of 2024, once the program ceased airing live from July, the On This Day segment was moved to the podcast only. All radio segments featured on-air, including Top 3 at 3, What’s On The Back Page and Three-way quiz are included in the podcast as well.

In February 2025, Sheargold was taken off-air due to two comments that were perceived as sexist & crude by the public. Sheargold's employment with Triple M was subsequently terminated and the program was cancelled the next day.
