= The Cage (radio show) =

Australian radio programs

The Cage is the name of two different breakfast shows on Australian radio network Triple M, broadcasting in Brisbane and Melbourne. Previously Sydney and Adelaide received the Melbourne version, however these cities now have their own individual shows.

The Melbourne Cage finished up at the end of 2007. They broadcast the last show after 6 years in November. It was announced that the team and Triple M have decided not to continue after longtime member James Brayshaw decided not to return. From 2008, comedian Peter Helliar took over the Melbourne breakfast spot with co-host Myf Warhurst. On 7 September 2009, The Hot Breakfast with Eddie McGuire took over the Melbourne breakfast slot.

== The Cage (Brisbane) ==
The Brisbane edition of The Cage , aired weekdays from 5:30 am on Triple M Brisbane. The lineup featured Ian Skippen, Greg “Marto” Martin, Greg “Sully” Sullivan, and Emily Jade O’Keefe—better known to fans as “Skip,” “Marto,” “Sully,” and “EJ.” Known for its sharp wit, local stories, and offbeat segments, the show quickly became a morning staple for Brisbane commuters. After six years on air, The Cage wrapped up in September 2011, following a steady decline in ratings.

== The Cage (Melbourne) ==
The Cage
- Genre: Radio show
- Running time: 180 minutes
- Country of origin: Australia
- Language: English
- Home station: Triple M Melbourne
- Syndicates: Triple M Sydney (2002–2006); Triple M Adelaide (2004–2005)
- Hosted by: Peter Berner; Brigitte Duclos; James Brayshaw; Matt Parkinson; Mike Fitzpatrick
- Original release: 2002 – 22 November 2007
- Audio format: Stereo

The Melbourne edition of The Cage featured a dynamic lineup: Peter Berner, Brigitte Duclos, James Brayshaw, Matt Parkinson and Mike Fitzpatrick—affectionately known to listeners as "Pete," "Brig," "JB," "Parko," and "Fitzy." Airing weekdays from 6:00 am to 9:00 am AEDST, the show delivered a mix of humor, commentary, and quirky segments. Fan favorites included Jason Donovan’s Autobiography, Parko’s Idiot Box, JB’s Spin on Sport, The Duclos Report, JB’s Internet Joke, Happy News, The Great Cage Debate, and musical comedy from the Scared Weird Little Guys with their Song of the Week

As well as celebrity interviews, snap phone polls, music and comical chatter. It featured characters created by Matt Parkinson including Nurry from Frankston, Ivan Inkling of Special Squad, Dr. G.I. Low, Keith McKorkin, Nicky Knuckles, Hugh Jorgen, Gene Creamer, Gavin Spotsworth, Randy Buff, Antonio Banderas, Captain Speaking, Mike Tyson and David "Becks" Beckham. Duclos also contributed her own character in one episode, to gender-balance the characters on the show. Her character was known as Pretty McClitty and Duclos basically talked in a drawn-out bogan style voice.

Regular celebrity guests included Jason Dunstall, Laura Csortan, Peter Rowsthorn and Garry Lyon. Previous regular Cage members were Tim Smith ("Timbo"), Matthew Quartermaine ("Quarters"), Russell Gilbert ("Gilbo") and Trevor Marmalade ("Trev").

=== History ===
The show began in Melbourne at the start of 2002, when Tim Smith was given free rein to put together a new drive time show. When the breakfast show at the time flopped, The Cage was moved to the vacant breakfast slot only three months after it began. A relay of the breakfast show, with about 20% new content, was played in the drive slot. Triple M eventually decided in July 2002 to concentrate The Cage on breakfast only. In October 2006, Sydney radio ratings had 2Day FM winning the FM market and Triple M, with The Cage breakfast team slipping to 6.8 per cent, down 1.2 points and reigniting speculation over whether the show would continue the following year. At the end of 2006, it was reported that the drive-time program The Shebang would replace The Cage in the breakfast shift in Sydney, due to declining ratings, put down the shows inability to be able to talk about local issues due to the Sydney/Melbourne duality of the show. Austereo announced on 14 December 2006 that The Shebang would move to the morning shift for Triple M Sydney in 2007. From January 29, 2007, The Cage has only the morning shift in Melbourne. The cast remained unchanged from 2006. As of November 2007, the Melbourne Cage finished up and from 2008, comedian Peter Helliar and former Triple J/ABC personality Myf Warhurst took over the Melbourne breakfast spot.

=== Events ===
During the period of 16–20 October 2006, The Cage ran a competition where listeners had to travel across Australia to Escape the Cage. Teams of people had to get as far away from either Sydney or Melbourne within 5 days and whoever went the furthest distance would win $5000 cash.

In February 2007, The Cage held a night of stand-up comedy, The Cage on Stage, to raise money for those affected by the Victorian bushfires. Comedians on the night included all the Cagers as well as Wil Anderson, Greg Fleet and Cal Wilson.

In March 2007, The Cage held an exhibition of Brig's "meditation art", consisting of a painting of an orange elephant, an orange lady, a brown bear and a blank canvas for the week Brig missed class. $1850 was raised at auction and donated to the Camp Quality charity. Former comedian and former National Gallery of Victoria President Steve Vizard was one of the bidders.

To coincide with the 12th FINA world championships in Melbourne, The Cage held a Suburban Swim Challenge on 23 March 2007 at the Waves Leisure Centre in Highett, Victoria.
