= The B Team with Peter Berner =

- Genre: Current Affairs, Commentary
- Presented by: Peter Berner
- Country of origin: Australia
- Original language: English
- No. of seasons: 2

Production
- Camera setup: Multi-camera
- Running time: 1 hour (inc. adverts)

Original release
- Network: Sky News Live
- Release: 16 July 2016 – 2 September 2017

The B Team with Peter Berner (also known simply as The B Team) was a twice-weekly Australian current affairs television program which aired on Sky News Live. The program is hosted by comedian Peter Berner.

Berner describes the program as a "unique and lively take on the lighter side of the news and events making headlines."

The show premiered on 16 July 2016 and airs on Saturday nights at 9 pm (AEST), in the timeslot Paul Murray Live airs on weeknights. The program replaced Saturday Live, which aired during the 2016 election campaign. The program added a second weekly edition on Friday nights from 16 September 2016, replacing a compilation episode of Paul Murray Live.

The program was cancelled in September 2017.
