= Owen Blundell =

Australian country music singer

- Origin: Snowy Mountains, New South Wales, Australia
- Genres: Country
- Years active: 1986–present
- Website: Official biography

Owen Blundell is an Australian country music singer. He began to be successful in the mid-1980s, was a five-time finalist at the Australian Country Music Awards in the Male Vocalist category, and received an award from APRA for a most-played country song. Blundell is from the Snowy Mountains in New South Wales. He has toured Australia and New Zealand and appeared on the television programs Sixty Minutes and The Ray Martin Show.

Blundell has recorded 14 albums. He also writes songs, yodels, and does impersonations. Blundell lists Jimmy Barnes and Black Sabbath as two of his influences. He was brought to the attention of Triple M's Wil & Lehmo show, where Lehmo's mother mistook singer Ben Lee for him in a segment of Can Lehmo's Mum guess who the celebrity is?.

== Awards ==
=== Tamworth Songwriters Awards ===
The Tamworth Songwriters Association (TSA) is an annual songwriting contest since 1986 for original country songs. Awards are presented in January at the Tamworth Country Music Festival. Blundell has won three awards.

Year	Nominee / work	Award	Result (wins only)
1988	Owen Blundell	New Songwriter Award	Won
1998	Owen Blundell	Songmaker Award	awarded
2003	"I've Had Eggs for Breakfast" by Owen Blundell	Comedy/Novelty Song of the Year	Won
