= Nightmoves (TV series) =

Australian music television show (1977–85)

Nightmoves is an Australian rock music television show broadcast by Channel Seven from 1977 before moving to Network Ten in 1982. It played film clips, interviews and record reviews and was presented by Lee Simon and produced by Andrew McVitty and Michael Gudinski. In 1985 Simon moved to Channel 9 with the rock music show Rockit.

== See also ==
- List of Australian music television shows
- List of Australian television series
