= Marty Sheargold =

Australian comedian (born 1971)

- Born: Martin Donald Sheargold; 19 June 1971 (age 55); Nowra, New South Wales, Australia
- Presenting career
- Country: Australia
- Previous shows: The Marty Sheargold Show; The Shebang; Meshel, Tim and Marty; Kate, Tim and Marty

Martin Donald Sheargold (born 19 June 1971) is an Australian stand-up comedian, radio broadcaster, and actor.

== Early life and education ==
Martin Donald Sheargold was born in Nowra, New South Wales.

He went to school at Daramalan College in Canberra.

== Career ==
=== Radio ===
Sheargold's first job in radio was replacing Greg Fleet on a breakfast radio show in Adelaide.

From 2003 to 2008, Marty was the co-host of Triple M's The Shebang with Fifi Box and later a third host, Paul Murray, which initially aired as a national drive-time show, before moving to the breakfast slot in Sydney from 2007. The show finished in October 2008.

In May 2010, Sheargold joined Nova 106.9, replacing Ash Bradnam. In August 2011, Meshel, Tim and Marty moved to Melbourne and became the national drive show on Nova FM, replacing Fitzy and Wippa. After Meshel Laurie departed in 2014, Kate Ritchie joined the drive show, which became known as Kate, Tim & Marty.

On 24 July 2020, Sheargold announced his resignation from Kate, Tim & Marty and his last show was on 11 September.

In 2021 the Marty Sheargold Show replaced The Hot Breakfast on Triple M Melbourne.

In February 2025, Sheargold's employment was terminated by Triple M after he made disparaging comments about the Matildas and women's sport.

=== Television ===
Sheargold appeared as a guest comedian on the RMITV show Under Melbourne Tonight on 2 November 1995.

He has also appeared in Australian TV comedy productions such as The Micallef Program in 1998 and The Mick Molloy Show in 1999, where he appeared in the 'Bob's Scrapbook' segment. He was also seen on Russell Gilbert Live (2000) and Russell Gilbert Was Here! (2001), and as host, creator and writer on Hahn Ice Headliners (1997–98) on The Comedy Channel.

In 2003, Sheargold appeared in Bad Eggs, The Forest, and in Welcher & Welcher as The Courier. He returned to television in 2009 as Paolo in The Librarians.

In March 2021, Sheargold joined the cast of Fisk as law partner Ray Gruber.

=== Live comedy ===
In 2019, Sheargold made a return to live standup comedy after 20 years away from the stage. He sold out the initial 11 shows in Sydney, Melbourne, Brisbane, Perth, and Adelaide. He added 27 additional shows to the tour in 2020, returning for more shows in all the major capital cities plus Hobart, Canberra, and Cairns.

=== Other appearances ===
Sheargold has been a panellist on Under Melbourne Tonight, The Micallef Program, The Mick Molloy Show, The Project, Dirty Laundry Live and Have You Been Paying Attention?.

== Controversies ==
=== 2023: Behaviour at the AFL Grand Final ===
In October 2023, a series of details emerged that Sheargold had been swearing at Southern Cross Austereo's advertising clients at the 2023 AFL Grand Final. Sheargold took a break from media commitments following this incident.

=== 2024: Antisemitic comments ===
In March 2024, Sheargold aired comments that were interpreted as antisemitic. The comment by Sheargold that received complaints was "And, of course, I should have known it would rely on what the Jewish people wanted".

=== 2025: Misogynistic comments ===
On 25 February 2025, Sheargold aired comments on The Marty Sheargold Show on Triple M regarding women's sport and the Matildas following their losses in the SheBelieves Cup in the United States. His comments were widely condemned, branded as "misogynistic and offensive", and reported by international media. Football Australia issued a lengthy statement explaining why what he had said was damaging. Prime Minister Anthony Albanese also commented. Sheargold and Triple M later apologised for the remarks; Sheargold's apology, in which he stated "I can see why people may have taken offence to my comments", was widely criticised as weak and not a proper apology. Sheargold's employment was terminated by Triple M on 26 February.

On 27 February 2025, it was revealed that Sheargold had stated on his Tuesday 25 February radio show that he believes that endometriosis is "made up".
