= Viewpoint (Australian TV program) =

- Title card
- Genre: Current affairs, commentary
- Presented by: Chris Kenny
- Country of origin: Australia
- Original language: English

Production
- Production locations: Sydney, NSW
- Running time: 1 hour (inc. adverts)

Original release
- Network: Sky News Australia
- Release: 2012 – 2017

Viewpoint is an Australian television commentary program broadcast on Sky News Australia. The program is hosted by conservative journalist and commentator Chris Kenny. The program, similar to Paul Murray Live, sees Kenny and his rotating panel of usually conservative pundits discuss political news of the week.

The program is broadcast from the Sky News centre in the Sydney suburb of Macquarie Park. Initially broadcast on Sunday nights, the program was expanded to twice weekly in 2015 airing also on Friday nights, replacing Friday Live which Kenny also hosted. A third weekly show was added to Monday nights from 25 April 2016.

The series has been on air in its current format since at least 2012. Sky News has previously aired a program titled Viewpoint which was broadcast between at least 2003 and 2004.

Speculation over the future of the program began when it was omitted from Sky News programming announcements for 2017. It was confirmed that Kenny will move to a new late night format Heads Up in 2017.
