= Lee Simon =

Australian radio personality

- Born: Vassilis Simon; 1954 (age 71–72); Melbourne, Victoria, Australia
- Presenting career
- Show: Nightmoves
- Station: HSV 7
- Network: Seven Network
- Time slot: Midnight–1:00 a.m.
- Style: Adult orientated rock music
- Country: Australia

Vassilis Simon, who worked as Lee Simon (born 1954), is a retired Australian TV presenter and radio DJ, programme director and broadcaster. He hosted adult, album-orientated music show, Nightmoves from 1977 to 1984. As a radio presenter he worked for 3XY (1975–1979), EON FM (1980–2018, rebadged as Triple M Melbourne in 1988). He retired from radio broadcasting in 2018.

== Biography ==
Simon was born in 1954 in Melbourne to Greek immigrant parents. At age five, he changed his first name to Lee, as "it was easier to use." He worked as an audio engineer from 1971 at local radio station, 3AW. His first job as a DJ was for radio 2BE in Bega, New South Wales followed by stints at 7HT (Hobart), 2NX (Newcastle) and 2SM (Sydney).

Simon returned to Melbourne as a DJ and announcer for radio station 3XY (from 1975) and then EON FM (from 1980), where he became their programme director. He hosted Nightmoves, claimed as Australia's first adult and album-orientated music TV program for HSV 7, from 13 May 1977. Initially trialled for six weeks it was subsequently transmitted nationally via the Seven Network for late Friday night programming from about midnight to 1:00 a.m. By 1982 it was being broadcast on Network 10 at about 10:30 p.m. Monday nights. In 1985 it was re-branded as Rockit for the Nine Network.

In 1995 Simon, as Program Director, was instrumental in Triple M Melbourne (formerly EON FM) beginning live radio broadcasts of AFL matches. As from 2010 he presented the retro music programme, Rock of Ages on Triple M. In 2018, he retired and was inducted into the Australian Commercial Radio Awards Hall of Fame later that year.
