= Peter Berner =

Australian comedian and broadcaster (born 1963)

- Born: February 1963 (age 63); Singapore
- Occupations: Television and radio presenter, comedian, cartoonist, painter
- Years active: 1988–present
- Spouse: Yvette Berner
- Children: 1
- Website: peterberner.com

Peter Berner (born February 1963) is an Australian stand-up comedian and television and radio presenter. He hosted The Einstein Factor and Backberner on ABC Television. He previously hosted the news comedy TV series The B Team with Peter Berner on Sky News Australia.

== Early life ==
Berner was born in Singapore to a Danish father and an Australian mother of Scottish descent. He moved to Sydney, Australia, in 1964.

He is a graduate of the National Art School in Sydney, where he majored in painting and was on the student council.

== Career ==
=== 1988–1998: Early stand-up years ===
Berner started his career as a stand-up comedian in 1988. His career grew throughout the early 1990s. He performed at various festivals, including the Melbourne International Comedy Festival, Sydney Comedy Festival and Adelaide Comedy Festival. He wrote and performed many solo shows in Australia and the UK, and established a following of comedy fans. He also made frequent appearances on Australia's Saturday night comedy show Hey Hey It's Saturday.

Berner wrote and performed his one-man stand-up shows, Lonely Guys and Rant, which premiered at the Melbourne International Comedy Festival in 1997.

=== 1999–2003: Backberner ===
In 1999, Berner premiered his new one-man stand-up show, Disturbed, at the Harold Park Hotel in Sydney. He took the show to the Melbourne International Comedy Festival that same year.

Also in 1999, Berner began his first TV hosting role on his own show, Backberner, on the Australian Broadcasting Corporation. The series was a political satire sketch comedy series which parodied the current affairs news format. Character actor Louise Siversen co-hosted alongside Berner. The series premiered on 19 August 1999 and continued for four series before ending in 2002. The series was nominated for Most Outstanding Comedy Series at the Logie Awards in 2000 and 2002.

Berner performed at the gala evening of the Melbourne International Comedy Festival in 2000, which was broadcast on Network Ten.

In 2001, a portrait of Berner, painted by Martine Emdur (sister of TV presenter Larry Emdur) and titled Laughing on the Inside, was one of the finalists for the Archibald Prize.

=== 2004–2009: The Einstein Factor and radio ===
Berner returned to TV and the Australian Broadcasting Corporation in 2004, hosting the quiz show The Einstein Factor. The series involved contestants playing against a panel of three celebrity experts on a range of topics, with Berner as the quizmaster. The Einstein Factor remained on air for six seasons and 244 episodes. It ended in 2009.

Also in 2004, Berner hosted the Australian Film Institute Awards.

In 2007, Berner joined Southern Cross Austereo and was the breakfast host of The Cage on Triple M alongside Brigitte Duclos, James Brayshaw, Matt Parkinson and Mike Fitzpatrick. The breakfast show was networked in Sydney, Melbourne and Brisbane util 2009. During this time Berner also had his own one-man radio show on the Triple M network; The Peter Berner Experiment was on air from 2008 to 2009.

After some years away from the comedy festival scene, Berner returned with his one-man stand-up show Bernerland, which premiered at the Melbourne International Comedy Festival in 2007. In 2008, he performed the show at the Adelaide Fringe Festival in 2008.

In 2008, Berner co-wrote and hosted The Loaded Brush on Australian Broadcasting Corporation. The documentary explored his passion for the craft of painting, and consisted of video diaries Berner filmed of himself painting his own self-portrait for the Archibald Prize, as well as interviews with other artists who had previously entered the Archibald competition.

=== 2010–2014: You Have Been Watching and art exhibitions ===
Berner returned to TV screens in 2011, hosting You Have Been Watching on The Comedy Channel on Foxtel. Based on the U.K. series of the same name, You Have Been Watching is a quiz show on the topic of television, featuring a panel of three celebrity guests and Berner as the quizmaster. It premiered on 17 February 2011 and lasted one series.

In 2011, Berner exhibited a solo show of his paintings at Gallery@28 in Sydney, Australia. His paintings were abstract portraits of lonely figures, using oils, pastel crayons and pencil.

In 2013, Berner joined the third series of The Celebrity Apprentice Australia on the Nine Network. He was the second celebrity contestant to be fired by Mark Bouris on the show, and he raised AUD$10,000 for his nominated charity, ChildFund Australia.

Berner performed at the Brisbane Comedy Festival in 2014.

=== 2015-present: The Book of He and The B Team with Peter Berner ===
Berner published his first book in November 2015. The Book of He (Finch Publishing) is a collection of original cartoons.

In 2016, he appeared on the Nine Network's comedy clip show 20 to One.

Berner returned to TV hosting duties in 2016 with The B Team with Peter Berner, a live weekly news comedy show, on Sky News Australia. The show premiered on Saturday 16 July 2016, and was soon extended to two nights a week.

During this time Berner made appearances on Paul Murray Live, Good News Week, Studio 10 and Hughesy, We Have a Problem.
