= Chris Kenny =

Australian journalist

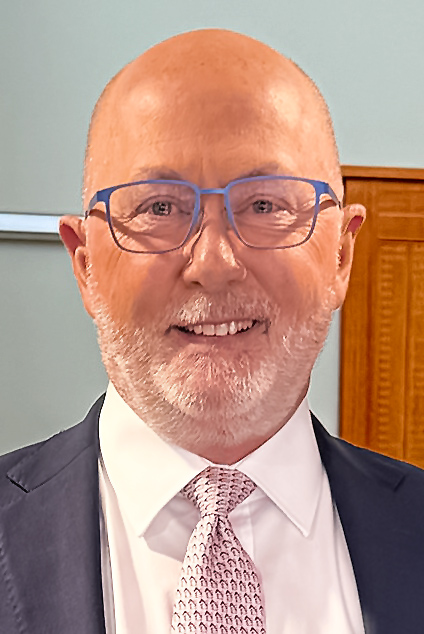
- Kenny
- Born: 28 September 1962 (age 64)
- Occupations: Pundit; TV presenter; columnist
- Employers: Sky News Australia; The Australian

Chris Kevin Kenny (born 28 September 1962) is an Australian conservative political commentator, author and former political adviser. He is a columnist for The Australian newspaper as well as the host of a weeknight current affairs program, The Kenny Report on Sky News Australia.

== Early life and education ==
Chris Kenny was born on 28 September 1962.

He initially studied wildlife and park management in South Australia and worked for the National Parks and Wildlife Service as a fire-spotter and park assistant, before switching his studies to a BA in journalism in 1984.

== Career ==
His first journalism job was at the Murray Pioneer in Renmark. He later worked for the Adelaide newspaper The News, ABC's The 7.30 Report, Channel 10 and Channel 9 in Adelaide. He also wrote columns for The Advertiser, Sunday Mail and The Adelaide Review.

In 2000 he was appointed Director of Strategic Communications for South Australian Liberal Premier John Olsen, before serving as chief of staff to Olsen's successor as premier, Rob Kerin. Kenny was appointed media advisor to foreign minister Alexander Downer in 2002 and became his chief of staff in 2006.

After the defeat of the Howard government in 2007, Kenny worked as a columnist for The Advertiser, as a television reporter for the Adelaide edition of A Current Affair, and as a talkback radio host for 5AA.

In January 2009, Kenny was recruited as chief of staff to then-opposition leader, Malcolm Turnbull. Kenny was Turnbull's chief of staff during the Utegate scandal but has written that he had no contact with Turnbull's mole Godwin Grech, resigning when Turnbull subsequently lost the Liberal leadership to Tony Abbott in 2009. After leaving Turnbull's office, Kenny wrote opinion pieces and analysis for The Australian and ABC's The Drum, and appeared as a commentator on Sky News. In 2010 Kenny was appointed General Manager, External Affairs, for transport giant Asciano, but left at the end of the year to return to media work.

From 2013, Kenny has hosted Viewpoint and Friday Live on Sky News Australia, which are both opinion programs. Friday Live finished on 12 December 2014, replaced by a second weekly edition of Viewpoint. Prior to these formats, Kenny hosted Saturday Agenda.

Kenny has two weekly columns in The Australian. He relinquished his weekly column for Adelaide's Sunday Mail. He has hosted afternoon and evening talkback radio on Macquarie Radio filling in for hosts such as Ben Fordham, Steve Price and Ross Greenwood, as well as hosting his own weekly Friday Feedback show until March 2019.

Kenny has appeared on ABC TV programs such as Insiders and Q&A alongside politicians and community figures.

He is currently a columnist for The Australian newspaper as well as the host of a weeknight current affairs program, The Kenny Report, and formerly, weekly media program, Kenny on Media, on Sky News Australia.

== Opinions and other roles ==
Kenny has been a vocal critic of the Australian Broadcasting Corporation (ABC) for alleged expansionism and bias. In 2020, he referred to the Australian public broadcasters ABC and SBS as "enemies of the people".

He argued in July 2011 that Julia Gillard could not recover as prime minister, that Labor would lose the next general election and that Kevin Rudd could limit the extent of those losses.

Following the 2014 Sydney hostage crisis, Kenny criticised the #illridewithyou campaign and the refusal of many to accept the Islamist motivation of the siege. Kenny had been at the Lindt Chocolate Café, the scene of the hostage crisis, only minutes before it unfolded.

In November 2019, it was announced that Kenny would be one of 20 members of the Senior Advisory Group (SAG) to help co-design the Indigenous voice to government set up by Ken Wyatt, the Minister for Indigenous Australians under the Morrison government. SAG was co-chaired by Wyatt, Marcia Langton, and Tom Calma. Kenny has previously criticised Langton as being "aggressive" towards "perceived ideological enemies".

In 2021, after Prime Minister Scott Morrison started aiming for net zero carbon emissions by 2050, and his employer News Corp changed its position on climate change (having previously denied its existence), Kenny wrote that the founder of the Liberal Party, Sir Robert Menzies, would be "turning in his grave", claiming that "expansion of government power" was responsible for News Corp's change in direction.

In the lead-up to the 2023 Australian Indigenous Voice referendum, Kenny supported the Yes campaign, saying that the No campaign is "overwhelmingly based on fear". He has been criticised by his fan base for his stance, although not by his colleagues at News Corp.

== Defamation case ==
In September 2013, the ABC program The Hamster Decides broadcast a photoshopped image of Kenny having sex with a dog. At the end of 2013, Kenny launched defamation action against the ABC program involved and one of its hosts, Andrew Hansen. In April 2014, the managing director of the ABC apologised to Kenny for the incident, and expressed regret for "the delay in making this apology". In June 2014, a ruling by the Australian Communications and Media Authority found that the skit was a potential source of "deep offence" to Kenny and others, and was "disturbingly bullying" in character. As part of its settlement of Kenny's defamation suit, the ABC agreed to pay Kenny $35,000 and apologise to him on-air. Kenny defended his conduct during the case, telling The Guardian that "I'll be remembered as the journalist called a dog f**ker who stood up for his rights". Nonetheless, sections of the Australian media expressed concern about the ruling, with The Conversation's Mark Rolfe arguing that Kenny "took the skit out of its context" and The Guardian's David Marr saying that the case "raise[d] serious questions about free speech in Australia".

== Personal life ==
Kenny is a keen Australian rules football follower, having played at reserve grade level for SANFL clubs Norwood and West Adelaide. In 2014 he was appointed an official ambassador for AFL club Adelaide.

Kenny is the cousin of political journalist Mark Kenny. His sister Therese Kenny ran unsuccessfully as the Liberal candidate for Torrens in the 2018 South Australian state election.

== Published works ==
- State of Denial (Wakefield Press, 1993, ISBN 978-1862543003) about the 1992 collapse of the State Bank of South Australia
- It Would be Nice if There was Some Women's Business: The Story Behind the Hindmarsh Island Affair (Duffy & Snellgrove, 1996, ISBN 978-1875989102) about the Hindmarsh Island bridge controversy
- Chapter One, "The race card" in The Forgotten People – Liberal and conservative approaches to recognising Indigenous peoples (Melbourne University Press, 2016, edited by Damien Freeman and Shireen Morris)
- Adelaide Crows chapter, Heartfelt Moments in Australian Rules Football, (Connor Court Publishing, 2016. Edited by Ross Fitzgerald ISBN 9781925138948)
