= The Brown Album (Martin/Molloy album) =

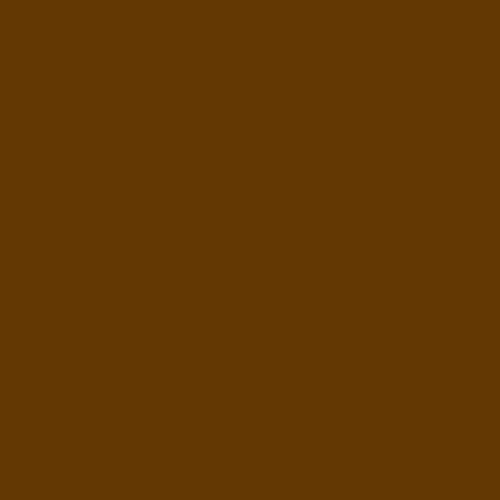

Compilation album by Martin/Molloy
- Released: December 1995
- Recorded: April to October 1995
- Genre: Comedy
- Length: 132:03
- Label: Mushroom
- Producers: Tony Martin, Mick Molloy

Martin/Molloy chronology
The Brown Album (1995)	Poop Chute (1996)

The Brown Album is the debut album of material taken from the Australian radio program Martin/Molloy, by comedians Tony Martin and Mick Molloy. The album was released in December 1995 and peaked at number 17 on the ARIA Charts and was certified gold. At the ARIA Music Awards of 1996, The Brown Album won the ARIA Award for Best Comedy Release.

== Background ==
Martin/Molloy was an Australian radio comedy show (1995–1998) hosted by the duo of Tony Martin and Mick Molloy. Segments which were aired live between April and October 1995 were selected for the 2× CD, The Brown Album, which was released in December of that year. It peaked at number 17 on the ARIA Albums chart and was certified gold by ARIA for shipment of over 35,000 copies. At the ARIA Music Awards of 1996, the album won Best Comedy Release. It was also nominated for Highest Selling Album.

== Track listing ==
Disc One: Pretty Brown

1. "In Conversation with Pete the Clown"
2. "Mick the Clown (No Relation)"
3. "Put Some Pants On"
4. "Poofburger"
5. "Crap-Tel – My Two Annoying Dads"
6. "A Frightful Hoo-Ha"
7. "A Bit of Knife Work"
8. "Martin/Molly Fantasy Line"
9. "Good Plain Fumio!"
10. "Shoko-Licious!"
11. "Urinal Cakes"
12. "These Are a Few of My Favourite Things"
13. "The Female Premier"
14. "Why Black People and White People Are Different"
15. "The Keating Twins"
16. "Pokies, Scones and the Midday Show"
17. "Tum & Phul"
18. "Damn This Actor's Strike to Hell"
19. "The Auld Mug"
20. "Wacky Tabacky"
21. "Martin/Molly Distilleries"
22. "On the Gases"
23. "Formerly"
24. "Histesticles"
25. "Bananas Sans Pyjamas"
26. "3D Radio"
27. "Crichton-Browne"
28. "Mike Tyson and Friends"
29. "A Bit of Chairwork"
30. "The Boom Gate Arm Thing Bloke"
31. "Just Keep Printing the Nudie Photos Hugh"
32. "Micklotto"
33. "Not with Fish!"
34. "Cracker Night"
35. "Tim Forsyth Turns Blue"
36. "That Depressing Voice-Over Man"
37. "Bank Fees"
38. "Ladies and Gentlemen... Pamela Anderson"
39. "Maggots in Black Tie"
40. "ABCFM - Bachtober"
41. "What the Papers Said"
42. "Viva La France"

Disc Two: Browner Still

1. "A Quick Wedgie"
2. "ABCFM – Less Talk, More Mozart"
3. "Spectacular Views"
4. "Shopkeep to the Stars"
5. "A Big Job"
6. "Arthur Tunstall's Answering Machine"
7. "Misleading Newsreel"
8. "Renovations"
9. "Bob Geldof Forgives and Forgets"
10. "Cahootery"
11. "Blue Hats"
12. "Pipes!"
13. "Cold as Ice (Willing to Pay the Price)"
14. "The Obligatory Tribute to Kurt Cobain"
15. "Not Quite Right Funerals"
16. "Bad Cut of Grandad"
17. "What Happens When You Phone Up to Complain"
18. "John Howard – Man of Mystery"
19. "Pretend War Is Hell"
20. "Stephen King's the Flower Seller"
21. "My Chemist Shoots Mine out of a Cannon"
22. "A Bit of Table Work"
23. "A Bun in Someones Else's Oven"
24. "Crap-Tel – Crap New Channels"
25. "B3"
26. "...Citizens"
27. "Docking Their Brains Out"
28. "Don't Shoot Me, I'm Only a Gun Shop Owner"
29. "Saddam Hussein – Still Crazy After All These Years"
30. "Mick 'Live 'n' Kicking"
31. "I Need Toner"
32. "Poop Fiction"
33. "Poofburger 2"
34. "Advanced Supermodelling"
35. "The Longest Word in the English Language"
36. "Jimmy Smits Electricity Corporation"
37. "Good Grief!"
38. "Would You Like Christ with That"
39. "Orenthal"
40. "Where's Tony?"
41. "Where's Mick?"
42. "Gladiators Ready!"
- All material written by Mick Molloy and Tony Martin.
- All material originally aired live between April and October 1995 on the radio show: Martin/Molly.
- Aired in Australia on FOX FM Melbourne, 2DAY FM Sydney, B105 Brisbane, SAFM Adelaide and FM104.7 Canberra.

== Charts ==
Chart performance for The Brown Album
Chart (1995–1996)	Peak position
Australian Albums (ARIA)	17

== Certification ==
Region	Certification	Certified units/sales
Australia (ARIA)	Gold	35,000^{^}
^{^} Shipments figures based on certification alone.
