= Glenn & Mick's Celebrity Intervention =

Australian talk show

- Genre: Talk show; Entertainment
- Presented by: Glenn Robbins; Mick Molloy
- No. of seasons: 1
- No. of episodes: 6

Production
- Executive producers: Mick Molloy; Richard Molloy; Greg Sitch
- Running time: 60 minutes (inc. ads)
- Production company: Molloy Boy Productions

Original release
- Network: Seven Network
- Release: 20 April 2026 – present

Glenn & Mick's Celebrity Intervention is an Australian talk show hosted by comedians Glenn Robbins and Mick Molloy that airs on Seven Network. The series premiered on 20 April 2026.

The series was first announced at Seven's upfronts in October 2025 with no title at the time. In February 2026, the title and format of the series were revealed. In June 2026, the series was in talks to return for a second season which was confirmed in July 2026.

== Format ==
The series sees Glenn, Mick and a guest co-host conduct a comedic mock intervention with a well-known personality. This includes inviting their closest friends, family and colleagues to look back on their life and revisit the highs and the lows of their career.

== Episodes ==
=== Season 1 (2026) ===
No. overall	No. in season	Guest	Guest Host	Original release date	Australian viewers
1	1	Carrie Bickmore	Kate Langbroek	20 April 2026	790,000
2	2	Sam Pang	Lawrence Mooney	27 April 2026	693,000
3	3	Chris Brown	Denise Scott	4 May 2026	685,000
4	4	Guy Sebastian	Lawrence Mooney	11 May 2026	639,000
5	5	Dave Hughes	Kate Langbroek	18 May 2026	585,000
6	6	Mick Fanning	Lawrence Mooney	25 May 2026	544,000
7	7	Jim Jefferies	Lawrence Mooney	1 June 2026	637,000

== Reception ==
=== Viewership ===
The first episode was viewed by an average rating of 790,000 viewers and ranked second in its timeslot behind Nine Network's The Floor (975,000 viewers).
