= Michael Thomson (footballer) =

Australian rules footballer

Personal information
- Full name: Michael Thomson
- Born: 26 November 1961 (age 64)
- Original team: Strathmore Football Club
- Height: 187 cm (6 ft 2 in)
- Weight: 86 kg (190 lb)

Playing career^{1}
| Years | Club | Games (Goals) |
| 1981–1986 | Essendon | 46 (31) |
| 1987–1990 | Richmond | 42 (15) |
| Total | | 88 (46) |
- ^{1} Playing statistics correct to the end of 1990.

Michael Thomson (born 26 November 1961) is a former Australian rules footballer who played with Essendon and Richmond in the Victorian/Australian Football League (VFL/AFL).

Recruited locally, Thomson's career at Essendon coincided one of the club's most successful decades and as a result he found it difficult to command regular selection. He played ten games in 1981, his first season, which included an elimination final. In the opening round of the 1982 season he kicked five goals against Footscray but made just two further appearances that year. He participated in the Essendon reserves premiership in 1983 and put in some good performances in the seniors, including having 42 disposals and kicking three goals in a win over St Kilda. In 1984 he didn't play a single game and a shoulder injury restricted him to just six appearances in 1985, missing out on both of Essendon's premierships.

Thomson, a utility, was used mostly in the back pocket and as a wingman over the course of his career. He was granted a clearance to Richmond in 1987 and was a regular fixture in the team that year, averaging 18 disposals. After adding a 24 more games to his tally over the next three season, Thomson left Richmond.

He is the former husband of radio personality Brigitte Duclos.
