= Mick Molloy =

Australian actor and comedian (born 1966)

- Born: Michael Molloy; 11 July 1966 (age 60); Canberra, Australian Capital Territory, Australia
- Occupations: Comedian; writer; producer; actor; television and radio presenter
- Years active: 1987−present
- Television: The Front Bar
- Children: 2

Michael Molloy (born 11 July 1966) is an Australian comedian, writer, producer, actor and television and radio presenter who has been active in radio, television, stand-up and film.

He currently hosts Mick in the Morning on Triple M radio in Melbourne and football TV talk show The Front Bar with Andrew Maher and Sam Pang on the Seven Network.

== Life and career ==
=== Early years ===
Molloy grew up in the Australian Capital Territory (ACT) before moving to Melbourne in the 1980s. He attended The Peninsula School during his high school period and then studied performing arts at the University of Melbourne, where he wrote and performed in his first live act in 1987. It was there he met the Australian comedy troupe The D-Generation (the future cast of The Late Show) who later formed Working Dog Productions, and with whom Molloy would collaborate on several projects.

=== Television ===
Molloy worked with the D-Generation as a writer-performer on their 1988 Seven Network specials (he had auditioned for the D-Gen in 1986 but it was not until the troupe saw him in the 1987 Melbourne University revue, Laminex on the Rocks, that they signed him). He also worked as a writer on the Australian Broadcasting Corporation's (ABC) The Gerry Connolly Show (1988), the Network Ten series The Comedy Company in its 1989 season and, while working on the (unscreened) pilots for The Late Show, for the Nine Network (1990). Molloy was a cast member of ABC TV's The Late Show (1992–1993) as a writer and performer. As well as pairing up with Tony Martin for each episode's introduction and the "Street Interviews" segment, Molloy co-hosted the segments "Muckrakers" with Jason Stephens and "Commercial Crimestoppers" with Santo Cilauro. He played the thick-witted assistant of stuntman Rob Sitch in "Shitscared" and performed in many other sketches (providing the voices of Sergeant Olden in The Olden Days and Chief Chromedome in Bargearse). He also delivered a series of volatile rants in the "Mick's Serve" segment of Late Show News.

Molloy landed his own late-night TV show, The Mick Molloy Show, which premiered on the Nine Network in 1999. Planned to run for twenty episodes, it was slated by the critics and cancelled after eight. His next involvement with television was the show Any Given Sunday, with Nicole Livingstone, on the Nine Network in 2006. He was involved in the 2006 Commonwealth Games coverage on the Nine Network as a commentator for the lawn bowls events.

In 2007, Molloy filmed a pilot of The Nation, a weekly late-night news-based comedy hour on the Nine Network. The show debuted on 5 June but struggled for ratings, attracting 575,000 viewers nationally for its fourth show. Originally it was on Tuesdays at 9:30 pm, but was moved to Wednesdays at 10:30 pm and ended in August 2007.

In 2008, it was announced that Molloy would replace Peter Helliar on the panel of Channel 10's Before the Game, an AFL themed show, after Helliar had discontinued his position post-2007. On the show, his views as a keen supporter of the Richmond Football Club (Tigers) were often made clear. Molloy is one of the club's more prominent supporters and as well as appearing on Before the Game he has appeared in club membership advertising campaigns. In June 2008, Molloy made comments on the show regarding Nicole Cornes, the wife of former Adelaide coach Graham Cornes, in which he suggested she had slept with footballer Stuart Dew. Nicole Cornes sued the Ten Network for defamation and was awarded A$85,000 in July 2011. Molloy remained with Before the Game until it was axed at the end of the 2013 AFL season.

In 2009, Molloy starred in the sitcom The Jesters which aired on Movie Extra on Foxtel. He played a veteran comic Dave Davies who has become the manager of a group of young, rookie comedians and who has to cope with the behind-the-scenes antics of producing a comedy sketch show. A second series aired in 2011.

In February 2010, it was announced that Molloy and Eddie McGuire would be investigated by the NSW Anti-Discrimination Board following complaints that their on-air coverage of the 2010 Winter Olympics men's figure skating contained homophobic remarks. The complaint was later withdrawn after the complainant met with McGuire.

In February 2014, it was announced by the Seven Network that Molloy would be joining its one-hour AFL match preview show on Saturday nights during the football season. In 2015, Molloy was announced as a host of an online show called Friday Front Bar (subsequently renamed to The Front Bar). In 2016, Channel 7 picked up the show.

=== Radio ===
After writing and performing on The D-Generation Breakfast Show on Triple M Melbourne, from 1990 to 1992, Molloy teamed up with Tony Martin for Triple M's Bulltwang (1990)

After The Late Show finished, Molloy developed, again with Martin, the successful Austereo radio programme, Martin/Molloy (1995–98), which produced three ARIA award-winning compilation albums, The Brown Album (1995), Poop Chute (1996) and Eat Your Peas (1998). Molloy occasionally appeared with his former D-Generation cohorts on Network Ten's The Panel (1998–2004).

Molloy hosted another radio show, Tough Love (2004–06) on Triple M alongside Robyn Butler and Richard Molloy.

In 2011, Molloy returned to radio and to Triple M Melbourne, as a permanent member of The Hot Breakfast. He is also appearing daily at 6:50am on Triple M Brisbane's The Grill Team.

In July 2017, Triple M announced that Molloy would host a new national drive show with Jane Kennedy across the Triple M network in 2018. As a result, he transitioned away from The Hot Breakfast and was replaced by Wil Anderson. Molloy finished on The Hot Breakfast on 6 October 2017 and debuted on the new show, Kennedy Molloy, the following week.

In January 2025, Molloy rejoined Triple M Melbourne to front a new breakfast show, Mick in the Morning, with Nick Riewoldt, Titus O’Reily and Rosie Walton.

=== Film ===
Following the cancellation of The Mick Molloy Show, Molloy returned with a video release, entitled Shonky Golf with Mick Molloy, and he directed the feature-length documentary Tackle Happy (2000). He played Kim's dad Gary Poole on Kath & Kim (2003–04) and co-starred, with David Wenham, in two Murray Whelan telemovies, Stiff and The Brush-Off (both 2004).

He has starred in three movies, Crackerjack (2002) (which he also co-wrote, receiving an AFI nomination), Tony Martin's Bad Eggs (2003), and BoyTown (2006), which, like Crackerjack, he co-wrote with his brother Richard Molloy. During production of the DVD-release for Boytown in 2007, Molloy and his long-time collaborator Tony Martin had a dispute over the proposed extra content for the DVD and the two have not worked together since. In the 2006 Australian feature film Macbeth, Molloy played Brown; it was the second time he has appeared in a production of Macbeth.

He also had a role in the 2019 biographical film based on Michelle Payne's life, Ride Like a Girl.

== Personal life ==
Molloy was the long-term partner of Australian actress Sophie Lee in the 1990s. (Lee regularly appeared on Molloy's nationally syndicated radio show, as well as playing Tracey Kerrigan in the film The Castle, which was made by Molloy's former D-Gen colleague Rob Sitch).

Molloy is also a famous supporter of the Richmond Football Club. His affinity for the Tigers has been a topic on The Front Bar, and he has also turned on the yellow lights at the Richmond Town Hall to celebrate Richmond's 2017 preliminary final victory over Greater Western Sydney and had a street mural outside of Hector's Deli in Richmond depicting him wearing a Richmond guernsey.

In April 2012, at the 54th Logie Awards, Molloy delivered an onstage tribute to friend and colleague Bill Hunter, who died in 2011.

On The Hot Breakfast on 8 June 2012, Molloy announced that his partner was pregnant with twin boys. On 11 July he announced that they had been born the previous day, a month ahead of schedule.

Molloy has used his resemblance to Saddam Hussein to create jokes.

== Television ==
- The D-Generation Goes Commercial (1988) – Various – (also writer)
- The Gerry Connolly Show (1988) – (writer only)
- The Comedy Company (1989) – Various – (also writer)
- The Late Show (1992–1993) – Himself/Various – (also writer)
- Frontline (1997) – Himself (One episode)
- The Mick Molloy Show (1999) – Himself – (also writer/producer)
- Kath & Kim (2003) – Gary Poole (Two episodes)
- Stiff (2004) – Angelo Agnelli
- The Brush-Off (1996) – Angelo Agnelli
- Any Given Sunday (2006) – Himself
- The Nation (2007) – Himself – (also writer/producer)
- Before The Game (2008–2013) – Himself
- The Jesters (2009, 2011) – Dave Davies
- Have You Been Paying Attention? (2013–2019) – Himself – (31 episodes)
- Saturday Night Football (pre-game show) (2014–present) – Himself
- The Front Bar (2015–present) – Himself
- Bluey (2022) – Sparky (One Episode - Guest Voice)
- Do Not Watch This Show (2025) - Ice Cream Guy (1 episode)
- Glenn & Mick's Celebrity Intervention (2026) – Himself (co-host)

== Film ==
- Tackle Happy (2000) – Himself – (also director/producer)
- Crackerjack (2002) – Jack Simpson – (also writer/producer)
- Bad Eggs (2003) – Ben Kinnear
- Stiff (2005) – Angelo Agnelli
- Macbeth (2006) – Brown
- BoyTown (2006) – Tommy – (also writer/producer)
- BoyTown Confidential (2007) – Tommy Boy – (also writer/producer)
- Kath & Kimderella (2012) - Gary Poole
- Ride Like a Girl (2019) - Bairdy

== Radio ==
- The D-Generation Breakfast Show (Triple M Melbourne 1990–1992)
- Bulltwang (Triple M Melbourne 1990)
- Martin/Molloy (Austereo network 1995–1998)
- Tough Love (Triple M network 2004–2006)
- The Hot Breakfast (Triple M Melbourne 2011–2017)
- Kennedy Molloy (Triple M 2017–2021)
- Molloy (Triple M 2021–November 2021)
- Triple M Cricket (2016–2018)
- Mick and MG in the Morning (2023-2024)
- Mick in the Morning, with Roo, Titus and Rosie (Triple M Melbourne 2025–)

== Discography ==
=== Albums ===
Name	Album details	Peak chart positions	Certification
Name	Album details	AUS	Certification
The Brown Album	Released: December 1995; Label: Mushroom Records (D98019); Format: 2xCD	17	ARIA: Gold
Poop Chute	Released: November 1996; Label: Mushroom (D98023); Format: 2xCD	10	ARIA: Gold
Eat Your Peas	Released: November 1998; Label: Mushroom (MUSH33184.2); Format: 2xCD	27	ARIA: Platinum

== Awards ==
=== ARIA Music Awards ===
The ARIA Music Awards is an annual awards ceremony that recognises excellence, innovation, and achievement across all genres of Australian music. Martin/Molloy won three awards, all in the category of ARIA Award for Best Comedy Release.

Year	Nominee / work	Award	Result
1996	The Brown Album	ARIA Award for Best Comedy Release	Won
1997	Poop Chute	ARIA Award for Best Comedy Release	Won
1999	Eat Your Peas	ARIA Award for Best Comedy Release	Won

== Video/DVD only release ==
- Shonky Golf (1999) – Himself (also writer, director, producer)
