= Live from the Ivy =

Live from the Ivy was a radio program that aired on Triple M Melbourne during the early 1990s. The program was hosted live from the Ivy Club in Melbourne and aired on Saturday nights between 10pm - 1am.

DJ Steve Douglas hosted the program which cultivated a large following within Melbourne's dance community, which at the time was in its embryonic stages. The program played a combination of house music, italo house and hip hop and is famous for its use of playing remixes including Ultimix, Funkymix and Street Tracks.

Later in the 1990s, Triple M would subscribe to a "rock music only" format and refrain from playing dance or hip hop music.

Coca-Cola was the program sponsor and a single advertisement was played at the end of each hour.
