= Paul Murray (presenter) =

Australian television and radio presenter

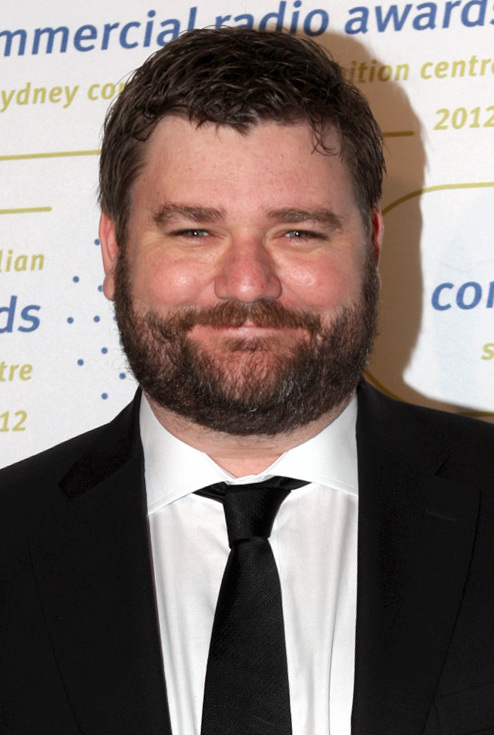
- Murray at the 2012 Radio Awards in Sydney
- Born: 14 July 1978 (age 48); Sydney, Australia
- Occupations: Radio and television presenter
- Years active: 2001–present
- Employer: News24
- Awards: ASTRA Awards – Most Outstanding Performance by a Broadcast Journalist; 2013 Sky News Australia
- Website: Paul Murray Live

Paul Murray (born 14 July 1978) is an Australian conservative political commentator based in Sydney. He was the former regular mornings presenter on 2UE show A Sydney Morning. He also hosts Paul Murray Live on News24, which airs Sunday to Thursday at 9 pm AEST, as well as a Saturday Edition. Murray is also the co-host of Fox Sports’ Motorsport 360.

== Career ==
In 2008, Murray joined The Shebang with Marty Sheargold and Fifi Box on Triple M's Sydney breakfast shift and also co-hosted the short-lived chat show The NightCap on 7HD. The latter program debuted with the first known public discussion of the childhood accident that left him with only nine toes. He also joined Sky News Australia, where he began hosting 180 with Paul Murray (now known as Paul Murray Live).

In November 2010, it was announced that Murray would be moving to AM radio station 2UE. He hosted both drive and morning shows, and in early 2013 he began hosting the morning show Sydney Mornings. In October 2013, Murray openly criticised the decision by 2UE to sack fellow radio host Jason Morrison.

In December 2013, after a period of declining ratings for Murray's show, it was announced that Murray was leaving 2UE (his final show was broadcast on 13 December) and moving to Sky News full-time to host the show Paul Murray Live on weeknights.

In 2019 Murray was the only Australian news anchor given an opportunity to interview President Donald Trump during Prime Minister Scott Morrison’s state visit to the US. He was widely criticised for asking soft questions, including “Have you had a good day with your Aussie mates?” and “What do you want to say to your many Australian supporters who wish you nothing but the best in November 2020?”.

Murray has implored voters to vote for the Liberal Party and admitted that “Sky News at night is a Liberal echo chamber”. He was a strong supporter of former Liberal leader Peter Dutton and a frequent critic of the Australian Labor Party and what he views as "left-wing" policies like action on climate change.

== Radio show formats ==
In January 2013, Murray started working on a new show, A Sydney Morning with Paul Murray, which, unlike other 2UE programs, broadcasts out of the Sydney Morning Herald newsroom.

== Personal life ==
Murray is married and lives in Sydney. He is a lifelong Wests Tigers supporter and a Holden fan. He is an atheist.

Murray is a conservative, often openly criticising the Australian Labor Party and the Australian Greens.
