= Any Given Sunday (TV series) =

- Genre: Sports
- Theme music composer: Franz Ferdinand
- Opening theme: Take Me Out
- Country of origin: Australia
- Original language: English
- No. of seasons: 2

Production
- Running time: 60 minutes

Original release
- Network: Nine Network
- Release: 2005 – 2006

Any Given Sunday was an Australian television program that aired on the Nine Network between 2005 and 2006. The show was not broadcast in NSW, the ACT or QLD, where The Sunday Roast screened instead, and was also not broadcast in WA, due to time difference the live AFL coverage was shown from 11am to 2pm.

The theme music used during both seasons was "Take Me Out" by Franz Ferdinand.

One of the hosts was sports personality James Brayshaw.

== Premise ==
=== Season 1 ===
At the start of the 2005 Australian Football League season, this one-hour panel show was created to air between the Sunday Footy Show and Nine's Sunday AFL game. The panel consisted of Garry Lyon, James Brayshaw and Sam Newman, and in a way it was a sports wrap show in the vein of Wide World of Sports, however the sports results took a back seat to the humour of Sam Newman and James Brayshaw in particular.

=== Season 2 ===
At the start of 2006, due to Eddie McGuire being appointed CEO of the Nine Network, circumstances meant that the regular team of Brayshaw, Lyon and Newman would be appearing on the revamped Footy Show, meaning that a Sunday-morning show with a similar lineup would be redundant. The show returned in Round 2 of the 2006 season with a different lineup, consisting of comedian Mick Molloy, former swimmer and Nine Network commentator Nicole Livingstone and a rotating third panel member. The first of which was Dermott Brereton.

Despite the fact that the show discussed all sorts of sports from around the world, its main focus remained AFL, as it previewed the Sunday matches. It always crossed to a commentator for a live AFL match on Nine.

The show was cancelled soon after the 2006 AFL Season. And all three hosts soon moved on the now popular 'Footy Show' now airing on both Thursday and Sunday nights.

== See also ==
- List of Australian television series
- List of longest-running Australian television series
