= Eat Your Peas =

Compilation album by Martin/Molloy
- Released: November 1998
- Recorded: January 1997 – September 1998
- Genre: Comedy
- Length: 162:48
- Label: Mushroom
- Producers: Tony Martin; Mick Molloy

Martin/Molloy chronology
Poop Chute (1996)	Eat Your Peas (1998)

Eat Your Peas is the third and final album of material taken from the popular Australian radio show Martin/Molloy, by comedians Tony Martin and Mick Molloy. The album peaked at number 27 on the ARIA Charts and was certified platinum. At the ARIA Music Awards of 1999, the album won Best Comedy Release; their third time winning that category.

== Background ==
Martin/Molloy was an Australian radio comedy show (1995–1998) hosted by the duo of Tony Martin and Mick Molloy. Segments which were aired live between January 1997 and September 1998 were selected for the 2× CD, Eat Your Peas. Studio personnel, who also contributed to the album, were Peter Grace (producer, panel operator), Sancia Robinson (assistant producer) and Pete Smith (booth announcer). It peaked at number 27 on the ARIA Albums chart and was certified platinum by ARIA for shipment of over 70,000 copies. At the ARIA Music Awards of 1999, the album won Best Comedy Release; their third win in that category.

== Track listing ==
Disc One – Peas

1. "Daniel" – 4:44
2. "Tum & Phul: Spult Mulk" – 2:29
3. "Two Blind Mice" – 1:22
4. "New Characters for 98" – 3:08
5. "Galaxy of the Stars" - 2:19
6. "Pete's Looking Good" – 2:50
7. "Stand Clear!" – 0:44
8. "Fully Grown Baby" – 3:19
9. "Bag of Sawdust" – 3:13
10. "Top Sorts" – 1:46
11. "Purple Rain" – 0:23
12. "John Laws: In One Bucket" – 1:17
13. "The All-New Blast FM" – 3:25
14. "No Stein!" – 0:51
15. "Yvonne Parts 1 & 2" – 4:09
16. ""Housekeeping!"" – 1:34
17. "Local Lads" – 0:50
18. "In-Flight Entertainment" – 2:22
19. "No Ashtray!" – 2:04
20. "Haughty Mick's Surefire Seduction Tips" – 3:09
21. "The Boatman's Call" – 0:35
22. "Up to Her Elbows" – 1:03
23. "An Enjoyable Chat" – 4:02
24. "Martin/Molloy UK Comedy Channel" – 3:08
25. "Mick Molloy: Ambassador for The Arts" – 3:39
26. "They Hate That" – 0:12
27. "Transplant Games" – 1:10
28. "Phar Lap / Bunkie" – 2:05
29. "One-Arsed Bandit" – 1:59
30. "A Cause for National Shame" – 3:40
31. "The Most Powerful Man in Australia" – 5:52

Disc Two – More Peas

1. "Mrs. Molloy's Birthday Blowout" – 2:34
2. "Don't Look Back!" – 0:20
3. "Mick and the Giant Peach" – 3:42
4. "Idiot" – 0:33
5. "Twenty Sheds" – 3:15
6. "Electric Furniture Warehouse" – 2:33
7. "Human Shield" – 0:15
8. "Location! Location! Location!" – 1:46
9. "Pete's No Dummy" – 2:21
10. "Whoppers" – 0:37
11. "Hefty, Wealthy & Wise" – 0:34
12. "The Horror... The Horror..." – 0:37
13. "The Birthday Boy" – 3:14
14. "84 and Still Pulling Them" – 3:31
15. "Whoppers 2" – 0:12
16. "Gordon Gordon" – 2:49
17. "See You in Hell!" – 4:03
18. "Electronic Underpants" – 2:24
19. "Nerdlingers!" – 1:27
20. "Lost in Velour" – 0:37
21. "The Wrath of Nutbags" – 1:08
22. "Ol' Blue Nads" – 0:30
23. "Advice for the Gentleman Caller" – 3:29
24. "Getting Late" – 0:10
25. "No Questions!" – 0:30
26. "Two Thumbs Down" – 0:57
27. "Mick's Dictaphone" – 3:38
28. "The Cosby Show Trial" – 3:32
29. "Mr. C" – 0:31
30. "The Track Where You Can Hear Simon Morley" – 0:13
31. "Lesbians Ahoy!" – 0:32
32. "Ye Olde Nutbags" – 1:15
33. "Farewell Sweet Princess" – 3:08
34. "Lest We Forget" – 1:32
35. "Yoko" – 2:03
36. "Tum & Phil: Hut, Huts End Stull More Huts" – 2:45
37. "Two Fat Bastards" – 2:51
38. "Next Caller Please" – 11:29
39. "Interview with Steven Wright" (hidden track)
- All material written by Mick Molloy and Tony Martin.
- All material originally aired live between January 1997 and September 1998 on the radio show: Martin/Molly.
- Aired in Australia on FOX FM Melbourne, 2DAY FM Sydney, B105 Brisbane, SAFM Adelaide, FM104.7 Canberra, PMFM Perth, TTTFM Hobart, NXFM Newcastle, POWERFM Ballarat, POWERFM Nowra, B104.9 Albury, 2XL Cooma, HOTFM Cairns, 3GG Traralgon, FM93 Wagga Wagga, 105.9 Orange, EagleFM Goulburn, SeaFM Sunshine Coast, SeaFM Gold Coast and Hot100 Darwin.

== Charts ==
=== Weekly charts ===
Weekly chart performance for Eat Your Peas
Chart (1998–1999)	Peak position
Australian Albums (ARIA)	27

=== Year-end charts ===
Year-end chart performance for Eat Your Peas
Chart (1998)	Position
Australian Albums (ARIA)	84

== Certification ==
Region	Certification	Certified units/sales
Australia (ARIA)	Gold	35,000^{^}
^{^} Shipments figures based on certification alone.
