= Poop Chute =

Compilation album by Martin/Molloy
- Released: November 1996
- Recorded: September 1995 to September 1996
- Genre: Comedy
- Label: Mushroom Records
- Producer: Tony Martin, Mick Molloy

Martin/Molloy chronology
The Brown Album (1995)	Poop Chute (1996)	Eat Your Peas (1998)

Poop Chute is the second album of material taken from Australia's Martin/Molloy radio program, by comedians Tony Martin and Mick Molloy. The album peaked at number 10 on the ARIA Charts and was certified gold.

At the ARIA Music Awards of 1997 the album won the ARIA Award for Best Comedy Release.

== Track listing ==
Disc One – First Load

1. "Classical Gas" – 0:53
2. "Funbags" – 1:02
3. "There He Is, Mr Nude Australia" – 1:44
4. "Off Duty" – 1:42
5. "The First Window" – 2:15
6. "Wacky Campers" – 1:38
7. "Who Made Your Paper Hat?" – 0:18
8. "There's a Wilderness Society Bear in There" – 1:23
9. "Humpy" – 2:30
10. "Bjork's Backyard" – 1:38
11. "Unlawfull Entry" – 1:05
12. "Dinner's Ready John-John" – 0:27
13. "Tum & Phul: Lunt Fulter" – 1:56
14. "Chocolate Makes David Sleepy" – 2:34
15. "Yarning By Numbers" – 2:08
16. "The Babfabbabbs" – 3:40
17. "This'll Get Complaints" – 0:20
18. "Paul Keating -'I've Got Feelings Too'" – 2:07
19. "Just Voting" – 1:26
20. "Gun Disposal Fun Park" – 2:13
21. "Not Much Fun" – 0:16
22. "The Nutty Serial Killer" – 1:00
23. "That Stretchy Liver Eating Bloke" – 0:29
24. "Fat Little Bugger" – 0:17
25. "Lateline: Crisis in Bosnia" – 3:12
26. "The Only Surviving Bit of Tony's 'Ten Pin Bowling' Routine" – 0:29
27. "Hey Botham!" – 1:37
28. "Untitled" – 0:16
29. "Slaque Mole" – 0:48
30. "Mr Average" – 1:07
31. "Bring More Chicken!" – 1:18
32. "Planet Collingwood" – 0:19
33. "It's About the Hat" – 2:35
34. "The New Generation Tamil Tiger GL Hatchback" – 1:55
35. "Stretch Denim in His Veins" – 2:47
36. "A Very Wedgie Christmas" – 3:08
37. "Mr Speaker" – 0:56
38. "Keeping Up the Vicar" – 3:20
39. "The Freak and His Beak" – 4:26
40. "Le Catcheurs D'Bogge" – 1:35
41. "Russian Made Easy" – 1:18

Disc Two – Second Load

1. "Stero Soundcheck" – 2:37
2. "Preferred Method of Payment" – 0:28
3. "The Headlights are on But Nobody's Home" – 0:27
4. "Mrs Vicious" – 0:12
5. "Tools of the Trade" – 0:44
6. "A Big General Lee" – 2:11
7. "Underpants Talk" – 1:01
8. "Blast FM" – 3:10
9. "Eden Gaha's In-Depth Report" – 0:43
10. "Barnyard Introductions" – 2:05
11. "It's a Planey-Wane" – 2:22
12. "Franger Talk" – 1:01
13. "Papal Dipstick" – 1:36
14. "Caution Squad" – 2:31
15. "You're Getting Sleepy" – 0:56
16. "Say No to Neil" – 1:26
17. "Nutbags" – 1:55
18. "The Running-Like-a-Girl Man" – 0:21
19. "Testing for Brylcream" – 0:21
20. "I Left My Heart (The Size of Phar Lap's) in San Fransisco [sic?]" -0:44
21. "Des Renford – 'In My Day'" – 3:23
22. "Reg Barry Motors" – 2:00
23. "Crazy Prices!" – 1:59
24. "Imaginary Rats" – 1:25
25. "Jason Recliner" – 0:50
26. "Martin/Molloy Pharmaceuticals" – 2:18
27. "Take Your Tablets" – 0:34
28. "A Short History of His First Time" – 1:22
29. "Airbags" – 0:31
30. "Lollybags" – 0:52
31. "Martin/Molloy Calendar" – 2:36
32. "Bronzed Beefcake" – 1:36
33. "Tum & Phul: Slup Slop Slep" – 2:07
34. "Andy Thomas Does His Bit" – 0:49
35. "Bad Jobs" – 1:05
36. "Jack" – 1:02
37. "Buried Alive" – 0:34
38. "The Future Is Here" – 1:42
39. "Black You Bastard!" – 1:55
40. "Black & Decker Panty Shield" – 1:58
41. "Sphagnum, Schmagnum!" – 1:13
42. "(What's the Drama) Dalai Lama" – 1:26
43. "Clacker" – 4:15
44. "Critics Corner" – 2:00
45. "100 Glorious Shows!" – 3:00
46. "Michael!" – 2:05
- All material written by Mick Molloy and Tony Martin.
- All material originally aired live between September 1995 and September 1996 on the radio show: Martin/Molly.
- Aired in Australia on FOX FM Melbourne, 2DAY FM Sydney, B105 Brisbane, SAFM Adelaide, FM104.7 Canberra, PMFM Perth, TTTFM Hobart, NXFM Newcastle, POWERFM Ballarat, POWERFM Nowra, B104.9 Albury, 2XL Cooma, HOTFM Cairns, 3GG Traralgon, FM93 Wagga Wagga, 105.9 Orange, EagleFM Goulburn, SeaFM Sunshine Coast, SeaFM Gold Coast and Hot100 Darwin.

== Charts ==
=== Weekly charts ===
Weekly chart performance for Poop Chute
Chart (1996–1997)	Peak position
Australian Albums (ARIA)	10

=== Year-end charts ===
Year-end chart performance for Poop Chute
Chart (1996)	Position
Australian Albums (ARIA)	74

== Certification ==
Region	Certification	Certified units/sales
Australia (ARIA)	Gold	35,000^{^}
^{^} Shipments figures based on certification alone.
