= BackBerner =

Australian television series

- Genre: Comedy / satire
- Starring: Peter Berner; Louise Siversen; Kym Gyngell; Tanya Bulmer
- Opening theme: "Thunderbirds Are Coming Out (5, 4, 3, 2, 1! Mix)" by TISM
- Ending theme: "Thunderbirds Are Coming Out (5, 4, 3, 2, 1! Mix)"
- Country of origin: Australia
- Original language: English

Production
- Running time: 25 minutes

Original release
- Network: ABC TV
- Release: 19 August 1999 – 14 November 2002

BackBerner was an Australian political satire sketch comedy television series, broadcast on and produced by ABC TV with Crackerjack Productions (now Fremantle Australia). The program was hosted by stand-up comic Peter Berner and noted Australian character actor Louise Siversen. The series aired from 19 August 1999 to 14 November 2002.

== Synopsis ==
The show parodied the current affairs format with Berner, but most frequently Siversen engaged in interviews with various representatives and authorities on the subjects of that week's news stories to discuss the issue, with various comedians playing the role of the interviewees. The most common of these characters were Dr Dennis Johnson who covered medical issues and Dexter Pinion, the far-right conservative correspondent for government reconciliation who frequently railed against the supposedly left-leaning "AB-friggin'-C". Numerous other character actors often made return appearances under different names, such as Nicholas Hammond who often appeared as Jack Bloom, a representative for the US Government.

The show was axed in 2002, and poked a last jab by explaining that Dexter Pinion had in fact finally taken control of the "AB-friggin'-C" and shut Berner down.

== Cast ==
The program was hosted by stand-up comic Peter Berner and noted Australian character actor Louise Siversen. Other regulars on the program included Tanya Bulmer and Kym Gyngell, who engaged in pre-recorded external and on-the-street interviews. Imelda Corcoran played Maria for 17 episodes of the show, most of them in series 3 in 2001.

- Peter Berner as Host
- Louise Siversen as Host
- Ian Bliss as various characters (11 episodes)
- Kym Gyngell as Self (10 episodes)
- Nicholas Hammond as various characters (6 episodes)
- Imelda Corcoran as Maria (17 episodes)
- Lynette Curran as Miriam Standwick (2 episodes)
- Denise Roberts as Beryl Todd & various characters (2 episodes)
- Belinda McClory aa Susan Lamb (1 episode)
- Rhiana Griffith as Kristi Taylor (1 episode)
- Jennifer Kent as various characters (1 episode)
- Chris Haywood as Michael Thompson (1 episode)
- Danny Adcock as Tom McLachlan
- Drew Forsythe as Martin (1 episode)
- Alan David Lee as Gary Morris / Mark Hitchens – Labor MP / Gavin Letchkey – Liberal MP
- Russell Dykstra as Mr Dennis McCauley
- Nicholas Opolski
- Christian Manon as Gérard Pétain and other French (6 episodes)
- Rebecca Riggs]
- Tanya Bulmer
- Ally Fowler as Julie (2 episodes)
- Bob Baines as Representative for Liberal Party / Representative for Liberal Party (2 episodes)
- Leon Ford as Blair Fife (1 episode)
- Peter Whitford as Henry Tinkwhistle (1 episode)
- Peter Sumner as Professor Norman Twigg (1 episode)

== Production ==
BackBerner was produced by ABC TV with Crackerjack Productions (now Fremantle Australia).

The music played during the opening and closing credits is an excerpt from TISM's song "Thunderbirds are Coming Out".

== Broadcast ==
The series aired from 19 August 1999 to 14 November 2002.
