= Imelda Corcoran =

Australian actress

Imelda Corcoran is an Australian actress. Active since the 1990s on Australian television and on stage in Sydney, she is perhaps most widely known for her role as Selby in the Marvel 2021 TV miniseries The Falcon and the Winter Soldier.

== Early life and education ==
Imelda Corcoran was born in Australia. She attended the Western Australian Academy of Performing Arts in Perth, Western Australia.

== Career ==
=== Stage ===
Corcoran performed on stage in several plays through the 1990s and up until at least 2002. Her first two recorded performances are in Perth and Fremantle, WA (1990 and 1991), but in the decade following 1992 they are mostly in Sydney.

Most of her performances were well reviewed, and include:

- Evelyn in Absent Friends, by Alan Ayckbourn, directed by Judi Farr at the Marian Street Theatre in the Sydney suburb of Killara, August – September 1993
- Rita in Educating Rita, by Willy Russell, directed by Crispin Taylor at the Ensemble Theatre, Sydney, May 1994
- A character in Bold Girls, by Rona Munro, directed by Ken Boucher Downstairs at the Belvoir Street Theatre, Sydney, March 1996
- Coriolanus, by William Shakespeare, directed by Steven Berkoff for Bell Shakespeare at the Playhouse Theatre, Sydney Opera House, November 1996
- A Game of Golf, by Alan Ayckbourn, directed by Crispin Taylor at the Ensemble Theatre, Sydney, July 2000

=== Film and television ===
Corcoran had a part in the sketch comedy series The Comedy Sale that had a short run on the Seven Network in 1993, and as Maria for 17 episodes of the more successful TV Australian satirical comedy series BackBerner, most of them in series 3 in 2001.

She was first seen internationally playing the character Taylor in the telemovie When Good Ghouls Go Bad in 2001.

Her first major role in an American film was the 2012 film A Perfect Ending, in which she plays one of the major character's best friends, one of a lesbian couple.

She first worked with the Marvel Cinematic Universe in two episodes of Agents of S.H.I.E.L.D. in 2014, as Dr. Goodman. In 2021, she played Selby in the Marvel miniseries The Falcon and the Winter Soldier.

Corcoran appeared in the season 3 episode of The Mandalorian, "Chapter 23: The Spies".

== Personal life ==
Corcoran is gay and married to Argentine film producer Victoria Alonso. Corcoran does not do interviews and prefers to keep her private life private.

== Other activities ==
Corcoran is also a fashion designer.
