= The Comedy Sale =

The Comedy Sale is a short-lived Australian sketch comedy television series, which screened on the Seven Network in 1993. The series featured comedy sketches taking place in a suburban in a suburban shopping mall, but did not rate well against its competitors in the time slot, 60 Minutes and Beverly Hills, 90210, and was axed after three weekly episodes. It aired at 7:30pm on Sundays from 25 July 1993.

== Cast ==
The series' cast included:

- Colin Lane
- Frank Woodley
- Robyn Butler
- Mikey Robins
- Daina Reid
- Celia Ireland
- Ross Daniels
- Steve Abbott (a.k.a. "The Sandman")
- The Umbilical Brothers – David Collins and Shane Dundas
- Imelda Corcoran
- Scott Casley
- Jeanette Cronin
