= Crackerjack (2002 film) =

- Promotional poster
- Directed by: Paul Moloney
- Written by: Mick Molloy; Richard Molloy
- Produced by: Greg Sitch; Mick Molloy
- Starring: Mick Molloy; Bill Hunter; Frank Wilson; Monica Maughan; John Clarke; Judith Lucy; Samuel Johnson; Lois Ramsay; Bob Hornery; Esme Melville
- Cinematography: Brent Crockett
- Edited by: Ken Sallows
- Music by: Gareth Skinner
- Production companies: Macquarie Film Corporation; Molloy Boy Productions
- Distributed by: Roadshow Entertainment
- Release date: 7 November 2002
- Running time: 92 minutes
- Country: Australia
- Language: English
- Budget: $3.5 million
- Box office: $8.6 million

Crackerjack is a 2002 Australian sports comedy film starring Mick Molloy, Bill Hunter, Frank Wilson, Monica Maughan, Samuel Johnson, Lois Ramsey, Bob Hornery, Judith Lucy and John Clarke.

== Plot ==
Jack Simpson is a wisecracking, directionless layabout who works at an inner city telemarketing firm. For years he has been a member at the Cityside Lawn Bowls Club (in fact he has three memberships), but he has never played a single game, having only joined to get the free parking spaces from which he makes extra cash by renting them to his workmates. But Cityside is in dire financial trouble and a greedy developer, Bernie Fowler, wants to turn it into a soulless pokies venue. The Club President, Len, decides that all existing members must now play and Jack reluctantly has to turn up on Saturdays to take part in the bowling matches. Jack proves to be a natural player but he soon annoys and upsets the older club members with his brashness and lack of tact. Veteran player Stan, sensing that Jack only needs some guidance, both in the game and in life, takes him under his wing acts as a father figure, teaching him to think of other people apart from himself.

After losing his girlfriend and his job, the Bowls Club suddenly becomes all Jack has in his life and, despite himself, he grows fond of the older members. His flatmate, Dave, joins the club and he starts a relationship with Nancy, a journalist. Bernie, determined to take over the club, investigates Jack and exposes his illegal car park hiring scam, which almost gets him expelled. Cityside enters a major tournament at Bernie's glitzy club, the prize money from which will save their independence. Jack's selfish showboating almost costs them the first round but Stan and the others make Jack finally realise he is part of a team.

Soon the Police arrive to arrest Len as (in a tip-off from Bernie) they discovered marijuana stored at the club. It turns out the greenkeeper has been secretly growing marijuana but Jack is blamed by the other members. Dave and two of the ladies, Gwen and Eileen, approach the State Governor and convince her to overturn a lifetime ban on Cliff Carew, the club's best player, and the latter takes Len's place. Cityside fights their way into the lead and Stan throws the winning shot but he suffers a severe heart attack as he does so and Bernie lodges a protest, meaning the shot is disallowed. Jack insists that the rules allow the team a re-shot and he takes his special shot, the 'Flipper', which wins the tournament. To rub salt into the wounds, Nancy proves that while spying on the club, Bernie violated a restraining order banning him from the club, an illegal act which disqualifies Bernie from holding a gaming licence.

Cityside experiences both triumph and tragedy; the club is saved and can continue in its old form. However, Stan passes away and the club names the green in his honour. The pot growing greenkeeper is sacked and Jack takes over his job and is comforted by Len who says Stan loved him like a son, he and Nancy begin a new life with their friends at the club. The film's end credits feature a postscript with still images and a narration by Jack describing the later exploits of all the characters.

== Cast ==
- Jack Simpson – Mick Molloy
- Stan Coombs – Bill Hunter
- Dave Jackson – Samuel Johnson
- Nancy Brown – Judith Lucy
- Bernie Fowler – John Clarke
- Len Johnson – Frank Wilson
- Eileen – Monica Maughan
- Gwen – Lois Ramsey
- Norm – Cliff Ellen
- Ron – Bob Hornery
- Cliff Carew – John Flaus
- Edgar – Peter Aanensen
- Mrs Jenkins – Esme Melville
- Mandy – Robyn Butler
- Greenkeeper – Brett Swain
- Supervisor – Christopher Kirby
- Official – Denis Moore
- Governor – Joan Murray
- Announcer – Tony Martin
- Security Guard – Steve Hutchinson

== Reception ==
Paul Byrnes, writing in the Sydney Morning Herald, referred to Crackerjack as "a good-natured comedy...in which there's a nostalgia for our lost honour ... This nostalgia for an Australia of mateship and communal spirit is the film's main surprise. This is a broad comedy with a televisual style – including some dreadful mugging to camera – so who expected social critique as well? The movie is about Jack getting knocked off the donkey, like St Paul. Jack grows to manhood through bowls. This field of green becomes his Gallipoli, in a way, as a bunch of senior citizens teach him about honour, fidelity, and teamwork."

Megan Spencer, reviewing the film for Triple J, gave the film a positive review: "Yes, Crackerjack is a familiar journeyman story, but it is one that rings true with some generously observed comedy and pathos, a film that unlike its Aussie cousins The Dish, Welcome To Woop Woop, The Castle, Siam Sunset etc. etc.... it doesn't patronise its characters, nor over-exploit the 'middle Australia' culture in which it is set."

David Stratton, writing in Variety, was less enthusiastic, referring to Crackerjack as "a middling comedy which fails to live up to its explosive title ... A pleasant enough screen personality, Molloy is, however, barely able to carry such a modest project ... Stronger support comes from a fine ensemble of vets, especially saucy octogenarian Esme Melville ... and John Flaus as the club's most enigmatic member."

When Crackerjack was first screened on free-to-air television, Network Ten ran station promotions over the film's end credits, obscuring most of the postscript narration by the character Jack. Interviewed by ABC TV's Media Watch, Mick Molloy expressed his annoyance.

== Filming ==
The main location for bowls scenes, including the greens, carpark, and interior rooms, were filmed at the Melbourne Bowling Club in Windsor, Victoria. Location shots of other bowls clubs included filming at the Carrum Bowling Club in the Melbourne suburb of Carrum. The Corowa Bowls Club in the NSW town of Corowa was also used for scenes featured in the finale.

== Box office ==
Crackerjack grossed $8,618,107 at the box office in Australia.

Crackerjack was the highest-grossing Australian film of the year and received two AFI Award nominations, for direction (Paul Moloney) and the screenplay (by Mick and brother Richard Molloy). Crackerjack won a GOLD Award for Cinematography at the 2002 Victorian & Tasmanian awards for Director of Photography Brent Crockett ACS

== See also ==
- Cinema of Australia
