= The Squirrel Grippers =

The Squirrel Grippers were an Australian duo made up of Tim Smith and Steve Bedwell. They released one album, which was a compilation of the Triple M morning show and some live material.

== Discography ==
=== Albums ===
Title	Details
Nine Inch Males	Released: 1997; Label: Mushroom Records (MUSH33078.2); Format: CD

== Awards and nominations ==
=== ARIA Music Awards ===
The ARIA Music Awards are a set of annual ceremonies presented by Australian Recording Industry Association (ARIA), which recognise excellence, innovation, and achievement across all genres of the music of Australia. They commenced in 1987.

Year	Nominee / work	Award	Result	Ref.
1998	Nine Inch Males	Best Comedy Release	Nominated	
