= Friday Live =

- Title card of Friday Live
- Also known as: Friday Night Live
- Genre: Current affairs, commentary
- Presented by: Chris Kenny
- Country of origin: Australia
- Original language: English
- No. of seasons: 2

Production
- Production locations: Sydney, NSW
- Running time: 1 hour (inc. adverts)

Original release
- Network: Sky News Australia
- Release: 5 July 2013 – 12 December 2014

Related
- Saturday Live; Sunday Live

Friday Live (originally titled Friday Night Live) is an Australian television commentary program that was broadcast on Sky News Live. The series premiered on 5 July 2013 as an extension of the Paul Murray Live brand. The program is hosted by conservative journalist and commentator Chris Kenny.

Similar to Paul Murray Live, sees Kenny and his rotating panel of pundits discuss political news of the week. Shortly after its debut, the series was retitled as simply Friday Live.

The program was broadcast live from the Sky News centre in the Sydney suburb of Macquarie Park. The program ended on 12 December 2014 and was replaced by a second weekly edition of Viewpoint, which Kenny also hosts.

== Spin-offs ==
A spin-off of the format titled Saturday Live premiered on 10 August 2013, designed as a short-run format in the lead up to the 2013 federal election. The initial season ran for four weeks, wrapping up on 31 August 2013. The show returned on 30 April 2016 ahead of the 2016 election. Additionally, it was joined by another spin-off the following night titled Sunday Live.

However, unlike the original format, both spin-offs are hosted by Janine Perrett.

A segment from Saturday Live was extended to its own program in 2016, titled So You Want To Be A Politician? in which Perrett interviews minor party and independent candidates hoping to be elected.
