= Richard Molloy =

Australian radio host

Richard 'Roo' Molloy is the younger brother of Mick Molloy and was the co-host of Tough Love radio show on Triple M.

Molloy also co-wrote the Australian films Crackerjack and BoyTown with his brother.

Molloy is an executive producer of Mick's TV talk show, Glenn & Mick's Celebrity Intervention, under their production company Molloy Boy Productions.
