= Wil & Lehmo =

Radio Show by Will & Lehmo

- Genre: Comedy (drive time)
- Running time: 120 minutes
- Country of origin: Australia
- Language: English
- Home station: Triple M Sydney
- Syndicates: Triple M Melbourne; Triple M Brisbane; Triple M Adelaide
- Starring: Wil Anderson; Anthony "Lehmo" Lehmann
- Created by: Wil Anderson
- Original release: 2 April 2007 – 21 November 2008
- Opening theme: Blue Orchid – The White Stripes
- Website: Official Sydney Site
- Podcast: Wil & Lehmo

Wil & Lehmo was an afternoon drive time radio program broadcast nationally on Triple M and was hosted by Wil Anderson and Anthony "Lehmo" Lehmann. It began broadcasting on 2 April 2007.

The timeslot for this show was previously held by The Shebang who had moved to the breakfast slot on Triple M Sydney. Liz Ellis was the first guest on their first show.

The sponsor for the show was Holden.

On 3 November 2008 it was announced that Wil & Lehmo would not be returning in 2009. The Wil & Lehmo show had its last show on Friday 21 November 2008.

== Segments ==
- Liz Ellis was part of a weekly segment called "Liz's World of Balls" discussing sport. Andrew Gaze filled in for Ellis over several weeks due to her sporting commitments.
- Justin Hamilton was in a weekly segment called "Hammo Time", where they discussed minor trivial matters.
- "Highway to Helliar" – Pete Helliar came in to talk to Wil and Lehmo.
- "World Record Wednesday" – to celebrate a record from the Guinness World Record Book.
- "The Caruso Quiz" was a segment that involved the opening scene from CSI: Miami being played, in which Lieutenant Horatio Caine played by David Caruso, sums up the crime that has occurred with a single one liner. Callers were then asked to guess what David Caruso said, with the callers' lines often being better than the actual line.
- "Can Lehmo's Mum Guess Who the Celebrity is?" Australia's 7th most popular Game Show – Lehmo's Mum, Jenny Lehmann tried to guess who the celebrity guest in the studio was; participants included Rove McManus, Grant Denyer, The Rock, Nikki Webster, Missy Higgins, and Angry Anderson.
- "Black Thunderbelly" – a parody of the Australian crime drama Underbelly, based around Michael Dickson, a fictional character who works in the back of a Triple M Black Thunder, and works his way up through the ranks.
- "I'm Not Whinger But..." – listeners called up and were asked to state trivial matters that annoy them and start the sentence with the phrase "Im Not a Whinger But..."
- "The Golden Caruso" – named after David Caruso, it was awarded every Friday to the person or thing that had given Wil and Lehmo the most entertainment for the past week
- "Sam Mac's Gladiators Review" – panelist Sam Mac gave a weekly wrap of the weekend's episode of Gladiators, much to the disapproval of Wil and Lehmo
- "Life For Dummies" – a set of rules was created for everyday situations, such as "Rules For a First Date".
- "Radio Eye-Spy" – inspired by the "Confidential" pages in various newspapers, listeners rang the show after spotting a celebrity.

== Ratings ==
In the radio ratings for November 2007, Wil & Lehmo finished 5th in Sydney, Melbourne and Adelaide and third in Brisbane.

== Awards ==
Wil Anderson was nominated for "Best Radio Newcomer" in the 2008 ACRA awards. As the awards are for work on commercial radio, Anderson's five years of work on government funded radio station Triple J did not count, making him a newcomer to commercial radio.
