= Rockit (TV series) =

Australian music television show (1985)

Rockit was an Australian rock music television show broadcast by Channel 9 in 1985. It was presented by Lee Simon who previously hosted Nightmoves. The hour long show played at 11 am on Saturday mornings. It showed film clips and interviews and gave information on concerts.

== See also ==
- List of Australian music television shows
- List of Australian television series
