= Justin Hamilton (comedian) =

Australian comedian

- Other name: Hammo

Comedy career
- Medium: Stand-up, radio, television
- Website: www.justinhamilton.com.au

Justin Hamilton, also known as Hammo, is an Australian comedian, writer, radio host, actor, and director.

== Early life ==
Justin Hamilton grew up in Adelaide, South Australia.

== Career ==
=== Standup ===
Hamilton is a standup performer who started his comedy career in Adelaide in 1994 as part of a duo called The Bunta Boys with schoolmate Damien. They wrote and performed songs such as "Red Necked Boy" and "I Wanna Be Hip", the latter a tribute to Rick Astley.

Hamilton has been involved in shows at the Adelaide Fringe since 1994. He appeared in the 1995 Adelaide Fringe parade as the second half of "Buttman and Throbbin'": a comedy crime fighter, wearing red fishnets and a yellow cape.

He has performed at the Sit'n'Spin in Seattle and the Gershwin Room in New York. He has also been a regular at the Melbourne International Comedy Festival and its Roadshow, and been a support act for Wil Anderson's live stand-up shows.

In 2014 he presented his show Johnny Loves Mary Forever 1994.

=== Television ===
Hamilton has appeared on various TV programmes, including The Librarians in 2007. In 2019 he was a cast member of the short-lived Saturday Night Rove. Hamilton was the head writer and regular guest on Whovians, an ABC panel show hosted by Rove McManus that discussed the latest episodes of cult BBC show Doctor Who. He was also the head writer on the inaugural season of Network 10's quiz show, Show me the Movie.

=== Radio and podcast ===
Hamilton has been the regular movie reviewer for the Perth Mix FM Breakfast Show and was a regular guest on the Triple M radio program Wil & Lehmo.

He had a twice weekly podcast from 2010 to 2017 called Can You Take This Photo Please?, in which he chats to other comedians including Simon Pegg, Marc Maron, Judith Lucy, Tony Martin and Dave Anthony about their craft. The name comes from when Hamilton would be hanging out with his famous friends, and people would invariably ask him to take their photo.

=== Other activities ===
Hamilton has also directed comedy shows and written and acted in his own play. He has directed shows by Tommy Dassalo, Nelly Thomas, and Halley Metcalfe, and directed Geraldine Quinn in the 2014 Melbourne International Comedy Festival (MICF).

He has been a judge on the panel of the Moosehead Awards, which are given each year to an emerging comic at MICF.

=== Awards ===
- 2003 MICF Piece of Wood Award for Justin Sane
- 2007 Moosehead Award for Three Colours Hammo
- 2007 MICF Directors' Award for Three Colours Hammo
- 2008 Adelaide Fringe Festival Advertiser Overall Fringe Award for Three Colours Hammo
- 2008 MICF Barry Award nomination for The Killing Joke
- 2011 Equity Award for Most Outstanding Performance by an Ensemble in a Comedy Series for The Librarians
- 2011 The Monthly "Comedian of the Decade"
- 2019 Adelaide Fringe Festival Best Comedy for The Ballad of John Tilt Animus
