= The Hot Breakfast =

- Genre: Sport, Comedy and Music (Breakfast)
- Running time: 180 minutes
- Country of origin: Australia
- Language: English
- Home station: Triple M Melbourne
- Starring: Eddie McGuire; Luke Darcy
- Executive producer: Michael James
- Original release: 7 September 2009 – 27 November 2020
- Website: Official site

The Hot Breakfast was an Australian breakfast radio show on Triple M Melbourne hosted by Eddie McGuire and Luke Darcy. The show began on Monday, 7 September 2009. Former SBS sports broadcaster Mieke Buchan and comedian Tony Moclair were part of the inaugural team.

The show aired from 6 am to 9 am on weekday mornings and merged sport, comedy and music with a more talkback style of radio. The show finished on 27 November 2020.

== Format ==
The Hot Breakfast format is based on the Grill Team format pioneered by Triple M Melbourne in the early 1990s, merging sport, comedy and music with a more talkback style of radio. AFL football is often a popular topic on the show given that the show is based in Melbourne and that the hosts are all involved with clubs or as AFL broadcaster – McGuire is Collingwood president and an analyst and commentator, while Darcy not only played for the Western Bulldogs but is an AFL broadcaster for Triple M and Seven Network.

Former Australian Prime Minister Kevin Rudd and Victorian Premier John Brumby were the first guests on the show.

Steve Vizard filled in for McGuire for two weeks whilst McGuire was hosting the Nine Network's coverage of the 2010 Winter Olympics.

Mick Molloy filled in for Luke Darcy in October 2010 while he was hosting the 2010 Commonwealth Games and joined the show permanently in 2011.

In July 2017, Triple M announced that Molloy would host a new national drive show with Jane Kennedy called Kennedy and Molloy across the Triple M network in 2018. Molloy finished on the show on Friday 6 October 2017.

In September 2017, Wil Anderson was announced as Molloy's replacement. Anderson started on the show on 23 October. He remained on the show until his resignation on 6 December 2019.

The Hot Breakfast finished on Friday 27 November after 11 years. It was later announced that the Marty Sheargold Show would replace the show commencing from 18 January 2021.

Mieke Buchan, Mick Molloy, Tony Moclair and Wil Anderson have previously hosted the show during its tenure.

== Regular Segments ==
Triple M Report with Seb Costello airs throughout the show with the latest news and traffic.

Finance with The Barefoot Investor is a segment where Scott Pape chats about all things Finance, each Thursday.

Crime with Adam Shand is a segment where Herald Sun journalist Adam Shand keeps his pulse on crime in Melbourne, each Wednesday.

Music News with Nui Te Koha is a segment where Herald Sun writer Nui Te Koha each week delivers news on musical artists from home and abroad, each Tuesday.

Technology with Lior Rauchberger is a segment covering the latest news on technology and gaming, appearing around once a fortnight.

Live from Eddie's Desk is a segment where musical artists from home and abroad come into the show and play music.

== Audience and ratings ==
In June 2013, The Hot Breakfast finished No.1 in the Melbourne FM radio ratings survey for the first time.
