= Brigitte Duclos =

Australian television and radio presenter

Brigitte Duclos (born 13 December 1964) is an Australian television and radio presenter.

== Personal life ==
Duclos, one of three sisters, was educated at Shelford Girls' Grammar.

In December 2007, Duclos announced that she had split with husband Michael Thomson. They have two children together.

Most recently her partner was Sam Westaway, a renowned Melbourne media power broker.

== TV career ==
Duclos began her media career in television in 1986 when she joined ATV-10 after finishing an Applied Science degree at the Footscray Institute of Technology.

Her major in Physical Education led to her immediate appointment as sports reporter, establishing herself as among the first female sports journalists in Australia. Specialising in tennis and golf, she covered all major tournaments, including the Australian Open in both sports.

Duclos spent two years as an on-the-road reporter for Ten Eyewitness News. She also presented weather, national news updates and, occasionally, Ten's Morning News.

Duclos also reviewed movies on Network Ten's national Saturday morning show "Video Hits", and has established a successful career as a host and guest speaker at many business and entertainment functions and has been a regular columnist with the Herald Sun's Sunday Magazine.

She is also famous for pulling yellow cards or red cards on her co-hosts or guests when they say anything that could be construed as bad language (especially around school drop-off times).

In 2006, Duclos was one of the contestants on the Network Ten special Australia's Brainiest Radio Star.

== Radio career ==
=== Triple M ===
In April 1992, Duclos took on the role of morning news reader for Melbourne's Triple M radio breakfast show, The Richard Stubbs Breakfast Show, and with her fun sense of humour and natural "chatty" personality she became part of the Breakfast Show team within four months.

After four years of breakfast radio on Triple M, Duclos in 1997 joined drive show, The Grill Team, sharing the microphone with Dermott Brereton and her former Network Ten colleague Eddie McGuire. She quickly established herself as a strong, quick witted, lovable "lady" of the trio, not afraid to give her opinion and equally not afraid to joust with the boys.

The Cage was a long-running breakfast radio show which aired in Australia (in Melbourne) on Triple M, part of the Austereo Radio Network. Each host (Peter Berner, Brigitte Duclos, James Brayshaw, Matt Parkinson and Mike Fitzpatrick), had a nickname which they use as their on-air moniker, although they also use their real names. Brigitte is sometimes known as 'Bridge' or 'Top Flight' by her co-hosts.

=== Mix 1011 ===
In 2008, Duclos joined Mix 1011 breakfast show titled Two Women & a Metro alongside Tom Gleeson. In early 2010 Gleeson left the morning breakfast show and was replaced by Anthony 'Lehmo' Lehmann.

=== Gold 104.3 ===
In December 2011, Australian Radio Network announced that Lehmann and Duclos would move to present Brig & Lehmo for Breakfast on Gold 104.3 replacing Grubby & Dee Dee. In November 2015, it was announced that Duclos' contract at Gold 104.3 would not be renewed. She was replaced by FOX FM presenter Jo Stanley.

=== ABC Radio Melbourne ===
In November 2024, ABC announced that Duclos will host Afternoons on ABC Radio Melbourne replacing Trevor Chappell.
