= Paul Murray Live =

- Paul Murray on set
- Genre: News, Current Affairs, Commentary
- Presented by: Paul Murray
- Country of origin: Australia
- No. of seasons: 15

Original release
- Network: News24
- Release: 2010 – present

Related
- 180: The Dark Side

Paul Murray Live is an Australian television current affairs and commentary program, shown on News24 and hosted by broadcaster Paul Murray. It airs Sunday to Thursday nights.

The show revolves around public X discussions and the slogan "this is a show where we tell you what happened today and hopefully by the end of it you'll know what really happened today".

News updates are presented by Sharon McKenzie.

== History ==
Originally a spin-off from Murray's previous Sky News program 180: The Other Side of the News, Paul Murray Live debuted in 2010 and presents the days news, offering commentary and a panel discussion on what has happened in the last 24 hours.

From 2015, Paul Murray Live will air weeknights, rather than its previous timeslots of Sunday to Thursday evenings throughout 2014, to make way for Hinch Live, which will air Saturday and Sundays as a continuation of the Paul Murray Live brand. From July 2016, the program airs a highlights edition on Friday evenings to allow Murray to host new format Saturday Edition on Saturdays.

The program has expanded to 2 hours in 2017, following the ending of SportsNight with James Bracey in 2016. Also in 2017, Paul Murray Live held programs from locations outside the studio with a live audience.

In the first half of 2018, Paul Murray Live was the most watched program in its timeslot across all subscription television channels.

In 2019, Paul Murray made international headlines for his interview with U.S. President Donald Trump. In 2019, Paul Murray Live Our Town tour travelled across the nation celebrating, supporting and showcasing local communities. The tour kicked off in February and raised a total of $400,000 for Australian regional communities in Launceston, Townsville, Toowoomba, Tamworth, Whyalla, Thredbo, Broome, Alice Springs and Newcastle.

== See also ==
- List of Australian television series
