= List of Australian comedians =

This is a list of comedians who were born in Australia, or have spent part of their careers performing in Australia. Some of these are known by stage names; these alter egos are listed in brackets.

== A B C ==
- Steve Abbott
- Anthony Ackroyd
- Craig Anderson
- Wil Anderson
- Pam Ann
- Anyone for Tennis?
- David Argue
- Aunty Donna
- Joe Avati
- Axis of Awesome
- Tom Ballard
- Eric Bana
- Carl Barron
- Tracy Bartram
- The Bedroom Philosopher
- Dick Bentley
- Rachel Berger
- Peter Berner
- Carrie Bickmore
- Big Al
- Jonathan Biggins
- Tahir Bilgiç
- Mark Bin Bakar
- Billy Birmingham
- Hamish Blake
- Dave Bloustien
- Grahame Bond (Aunty Jack)
- Shane Bourne
- Fifi Box
- Paul Brasch
- Scott Brennan
- Noeline Brown
- Brendon Burns
- Dave Callan
- David Callan
- Damian Callinan
- Michael Chamberlin
- Doug Chappel
- The Chaser
  - Charles Firth
  - Andrew Hansen
  - Dominic Knight
  - Chas Licciardello
  - Julian Morrow
  - Craig Reucassel
  - Chris Taylor
- Santo Cilauro
- John Clarke
- Club Veg
- Gerry Connolly
- Jan Cornall
- Mary Coustas
- Joel Creasey
- Raymond Crowe
- Andrew Curry
- Stephen Curry
- Lance Curtis

== D E F ==
- Ross Daniels
- Darren & Brose
- Tommy Dassalo
- Christina Davis
- Bryan Dawe
- Andrew Denton
- Catherine Deveny
- Anh Do
- George Dodd
- Scott Dooley
- Doug Anthony All Stars
- Jon Doust
- Des Dowling
- Marg Downey
- John Doyle
- Denise Drysdale
- Jamie Dunn
- Matthew Dyktynski
- Gary Eck
- Craig Egan
- Joff Ellen
- Col Elliott
- Ben Elton
- Jon English
- Mary-Anne Fahey
- The Fantastic Leslie
- Randy Feltface
- Tim Ferguson
- Noel Ferrier
- Richard Fidler
- Marty Fields
- Maurie Fields
- Kitty Flanagan
- Greg Fleet
- Drew Forsythe
- Chris Franklin
- Heath Franklin
- Alice Fraser
- Ron Frazer
- Gen Fricker

== G H I ==
- Hannah Gadsby
- Sandy Gandhi
- Jim Gerald
- Nick Giannopoulos
- Russell Gilbert
- Amos Gill
- Max Gillies
- Tom Gleeson
- Tom Gleisner
- Elliot Goblet
- Reg Gorman
- Libbi Gorr
- The Gorskys
- Corinne Grant
- Ugly Dave Gray
- Leo Grills
- GUD
- Kym Gyngell
- Imaan Hadchiti
- Jane Hall
- Justin Hamilton
- Hamish & Andy
  - Hamish Blake
  - Andy Lee
- Happy Hammond
- Tommy Hanlon, Jr.
- Andrew Hansen
- Mary Hardy
- Wendy Harmer
- Tracy Harvey
- Guido Hatzis
- Peter Helliar
- Geraldine Hickey
- Tegan Higginbotham
- Adam Hills
- Paul Hogan
- Claire Hooper
- Dave Hughes
- Steve Hughes
- Barry Humphries
- Simon Hunt
- Nazeem Hussain
- Dan Ilic

== J K L ==
- Sammy J
- Hugh Jackman
- Steven Jacobs
- Cameron James
- Clive James
- Jim Jefferies
- Jimeoin
- Matthew Johns
- Pommy Johnson
- Ed Kavalee
- Peter Kelamis
- Sarah Kendall
- Graham Kennedy
- Jane Kennedy
- Justin Kennedy
- Gretel Killeen
- King Billy Cokebottle
- Jean Kittson
- Cameron Knight
- Dominic Knight
- The Kransky Sisters
- Tania Lacy
- Dawn Lake
- Colin Lane
- Don Lane
- Lano and Woodley
- Demi Lardner
- Meshel Laurie
- Dave Lawson
- Josh Lawson
- Andy Lee
- Lehmo
- Jack Levi (Elliot Goblet)
- Lawrence Leung
- Chas Licciardello
- Chris Lilley
- Mark Little
- Paul Livingston (Flacco)
- Los Trios Ringbarkus
- Bruno Lucia
- Judith Lucy
- Ciaran Lyons

== M N O ==
- Trevor Marmalade
- Richard Marsland
- Tony Martin
- Paul McCarthy
- Lulu McClatchy
- Campbell McComas
- Julie McCrossin
- Paul McDermott
- Garry McDonald (Norman Gunston)
- Kate McLennan
- Rove McManus
- Garth Meade
- Merrick and Rosso
- Shaun Micallef
- Mikey Mileos
- Gabby Millgate
- Tim Minchin
- Tony Moclair
- Mick Molloy
- Peter Moon
- Anthony Morgan
- Julia Morris
- Julian Morrow
- Mr. Flotsam and Mr. Jetsam
- Andy Muirhead
- Maureen Murphy
- Paul Nakad
- Brian Nankervis (Raymond J. Bartholomeuz)
- Glynn Nicholas
- Joy Nichols
- Ross Noble
- Fiona O'Loughlin
- Dave O'Neil
- Ben Oxenbould
- Joel Ozborn

== P Q R ==
- Celia Pacquola
- Simon Palomares
- Sam Pang
- Matt Parkinson
- Eddie Perfect
- Charlie Pickering
- Greig Pickhaver
- Sue-Ann Post
- Terri Psiakis
- Puppetry of the Penis
- Rod Quantock
- Geraldine Quinn
- David Quirk
- Jordan Raskopoulos
- Carol Raye
- Roy Rene ("Mo")
- Craig Reucassel
- Harry Rickards
- Gina Riley
- Glenn Robbins
- Victoria Roberts
- Mikey Robins
- Drew Rokos
- Alex Romano
- Gabriel Rossi
- Peter Rowsthorn
- Roy and HG
- Rodney Rude
- Jim Russell

== S T U ==
- John Safran
- Akmal Saleh
- Terry Scanlon
- Scared Weird Little Guys
- Denise Scott
- Phillip Scott
- Yahoo Serious
- Jordan Shanks
- Max Sharam
- Marty Sheargold
- Ryan Shelton
- Sam Simmons
- Sketchmen
- George Smilovici
- Reuben Solo
- Vince Sorrenti
- Adam Spencer
- Andrew Startin
- Steady Eddy
- Jason Stephens
- Gregor Stronach
- Richard Stubbs
- Nick Sun
- Magda Szubanski
- Jenny Talia
- Chris Taylor
- Austen Tayshus
- Josh Thomas
- Dave Thornton
- Kai Tier
- Matt Tilley
- Emma Tom
- Mark Trenwith
- Mark Trevorrow (Bob Downe)
- Tripod
- Jane Turner
- The Twelfth Man
- The Umbilical Brothers

== V W X Y Z ==
- Michael Veitch
- Steve Vizard
- Stuart Wagstaff
- John Walker
- Tom Walker
- George Wallace
- George Wallace Jnr
- Felicity Ward
- Angela Webber
- Lindsay Webb
- Garry Who
- Kevin Bloody Wilson
- Rebel Wilson
- Andrew Wolfe
- Frank Woodley
- Working Dog
  - Santo Cilauro
  - Tom Gleisner
  - Jane Kennedy
  - Rob Sitch
- Jenny Wynter
- John Xintavelonis
- Julia Zemiro

== See also ==
- List of Australian stand-up comedians
- List of comedians
