= List of Australian stand-up comedians =

This is a list of notable stand-up comedians from Australia.

- Wil Anderson
- Tom Ballard
- Eric Bana
- Carl Barron
- Tracy Bartram
- Big Al
- Tahir Bilgiç
- Shane Bourne
- Gary Bradbury
- Paul Brasch
- Brendon Burns
- Damian Callinan
- Sam Campbell
- Michael Chamberlin
- Karl Chandler
- Aaron Chen
- Joel Creasey
- Ross Daniels
- Tommy Dassalo
- Anh Do
- Craig Egan
- Col Elliott
- Randy Feltface
- Marty Fields
- Kitty Flanagan
- Greg Fleet
- Chris Franklin
- Alice Fraser
- Hannah Gadsby
- Russell Gilbert
- Tom Gleeson
- Justin Heazlewood
- Peter Helliar
- Adam Hills
- Claire Hooper
- Dave Hughes
- Steve Hughes
- Nazeem Hussain
- Sammy J
- Jim Jefferies
- Jimeoin
- Justin Kennedy
- Gretel Killeen
- King Billy Cokebottle
- Cameron Knight
- Neel Kolhatkar
- Lano and Woodley
- Demi Lardner
- Dave Lawson
- Chris Lilley
- Mark Little
- Ciaran Lyons
- Judith Lucy
- Tony Martin
- Paul McDermott
- Rove McManus
- Tim Minchin
- Julia Morris
- Fiona O'Loughlin
- Celia Pacquola
- Simon Palomares
- Charlie Pickering
- Rod Quantock
- Aamer Rahman
- Jordan Raskopoulos
- Rodney Rude
- Akmal Saleh
- Denise Scott
- Sam Simmons
- Reuben Solo
- George Smilovici
- Vince Sorrenti
- Steady Eddy
- Nick Sun
- Jenny Talia
- Austen Tayshus
- Josh Thomas
- Matt Tilley
- Tom Walker
- Merrick Watts
- Garry Who
- Kevin Bloody Wilson
- Rebel Wilson
- Friendlyjordies

== See also ==
- List of Australian comedians
- List of stand-up comedians
