= Australian comedy =

Comedy in Australia

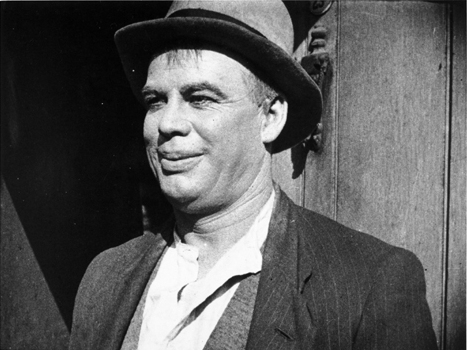
Arthur Tauchert, in the 1919 film The Sentimental Bloke

Australian comedy (or Australian humour) refers to the comedy and humour performed in or about Australia or by the people of Australia. Australian humour can be traced to various origins, and today is manifested in a diversity of cultural practices and pursuits. Writers like Henry Lawson and Banjo Paterson helped to establish a tradition of laconic, ironic and irreverent wit in Australian literature, while Australian politicians and cultural stereotypes have each proved rich sources of comedy for artists from poet C. J. Dennis to satirist Barry Humphries to iconic film maker Paul Hogan, each of whom have given wide circulation to Australian slang.

Vaudeville larrikinism in the style of Graham Kennedy and parochial satire and self-mockery has been a popular strain in Australian comedy, notably in the work of such as Norman Gunston (Garry McDonald), The D-Generation, Roy & HG and Kath & Kim. Acclaimed Australian comic character actors have included John Meillon, Leo McKern, Ruth Cracknell, Geoffrey Rush and Toni Collette. Sardonic political satire like that of The Chaser and social and cultural commentary provided by broadcasters like Clive James and Andrew Denton has been another hallmark. Multiculturalism has also contributed to a diversity in Australian comedy, from the work of migrant comedians like Mary Coustas and Anh Do to Aboriginal performers like Ernie Dingo. Australian stand-up comedy has a wide following and the Melbourne Comedy Festival is a major international comedy event.

== Australian sense of humour ==
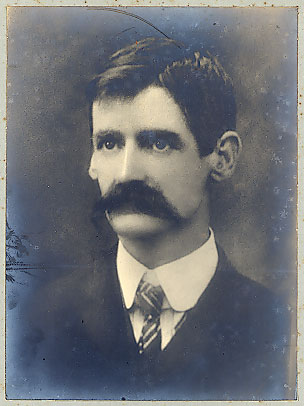
Henry Lawson

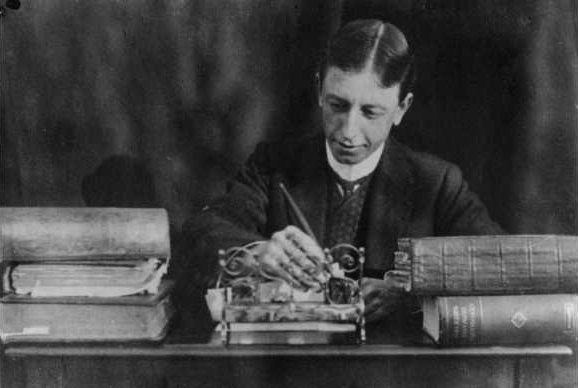
C.J. Dennis, poet and humourist of the Australian vernacular

The "Australian sense of humour" is often characterised as dry, irreverent and ironic, exemplified by some of the works of performing artists like Barry Humphries and Paul Hogan and by character creations such as mock-talk-show hosts Norman Gunston (Garry McDonald) and Roy and HG (John Doyle and Greig Pickhaver). Australian humour was influenced by the convict origins of European Australian history. It is today expressed in Australian slang as well as throughout Australian film, literature, and other media. While outback and "bronzed Aussie" stereotypes are a rich source of Australian comedy, so are the urban rituals and exuberant cosmopolitanism of much of contemporary Australia, as expressed by auteurs like Baz Luhrmann in the 1993 film Strictly Ballroom. The quirks of Australian multiculturalism have also provided fodder for comedy: from They're a Weird Mob (1957) about an Italian immigrant adapting to Sydney life; to the works of Vietnamese refugee Anh Do and Egyptian born Akmal Saleh; the Guido Hatzis parody and Nick Giannopoulos' Wog Boy 2: Kings of Mykonos (2010) about second-generation Australian Greeks returning to their ancestral home. Actor Ernie Dingo is perhaps the best known Aboriginal Australian comedic performing artist. In recent years, comedy duo Hamish & Andy have dominated radio ratings with cross-medium programming showcasing larrikin ideals and spirited curiosity.

== Formative years: early Australian comedy ==
While the convicts of the early colonial period helped establish anti-authoritarianism as a hallmark of Australian comedy, Watkin Tench, an officer of the marines on the First Fleet, reflected on the irreverent humour of his friends among the Aboriginal Australians of Sydney.

Influential in the establishment of stoic, dry wit as a characteristic of Australian humour were the bush balladeers of the 19th century, including Henry Lawson, author of The Loaded Dog. His contemporary Banjo Paterson contributed such classic comic poems as "Mulga Bill's Bicycle", "The Geebung Polo Club" and "A Bush Christening".

Early novelist Joseph Furphy wrote in the Australian vernacular and the poet C. J. Dennis reflected a sense of Australian identity and humour in the Australian vernacular – notably in "The Songs of a Sentimental Bloke", which chronicles the courtship and marriage of a larrikin called Bill and his girl, Doreen: including a trip to the theatre: "This Romeo 'e's lurkin' wiv a crew – A dead tough crowd o' crooks – called Montague". The Dad and Dave series about a pioneer farming family was an enduring hit of the early 20th century.

Australia's ANZAC troops of World War I were said to often display a streak of irreverence in their relations with superior officers and dark humour in the face of battle. Books like Norman Lindsay's The Magic Pudding use humorous anthropomorphism to transform the animals of the Australian bush into a classic work of Australian children's literature.

Vaudeville stars like Roy Rene 'Mo' toured with the Tivoli Circuit prior to the arrival of radio. Mo, in baggy trousers and battered top hat and using Australian English catchphrases like "Strike me lucky" and "Don't come the raw prawn with me" became Australia's most successful variety star and began performing on radio in 1946. The arrival of television in 1956 assisted in the demise of the large vaudeville theatres and a switch to small venue "comedy revues" – notably the Melbourne University Revues.

== Modern Australian comedy ==
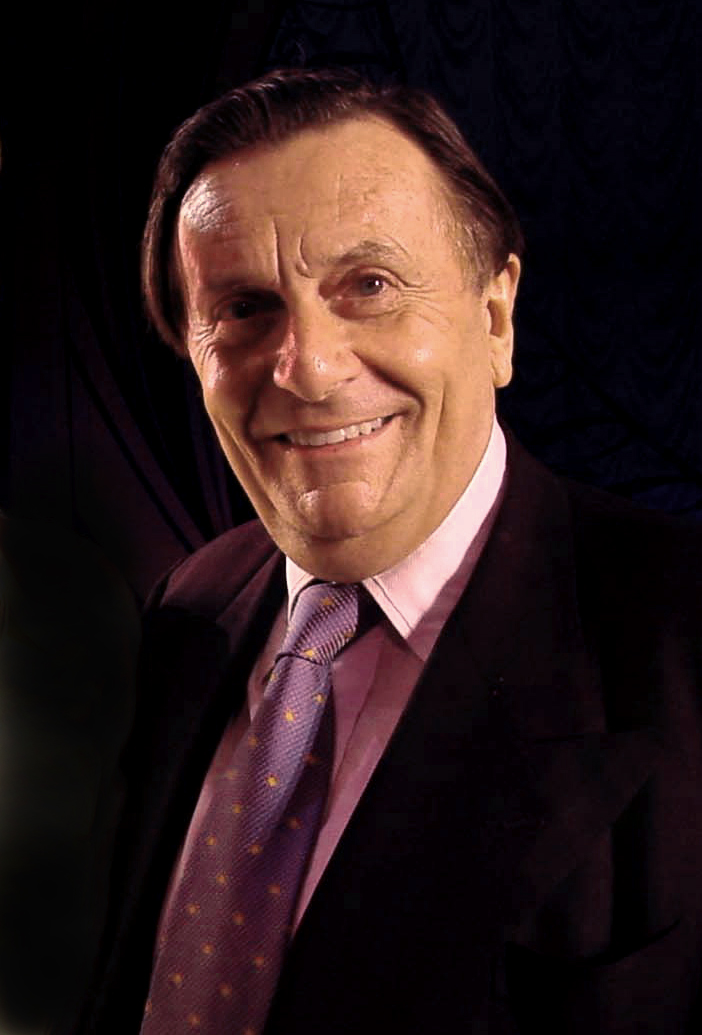
Satirist Barry Humphries in 2001

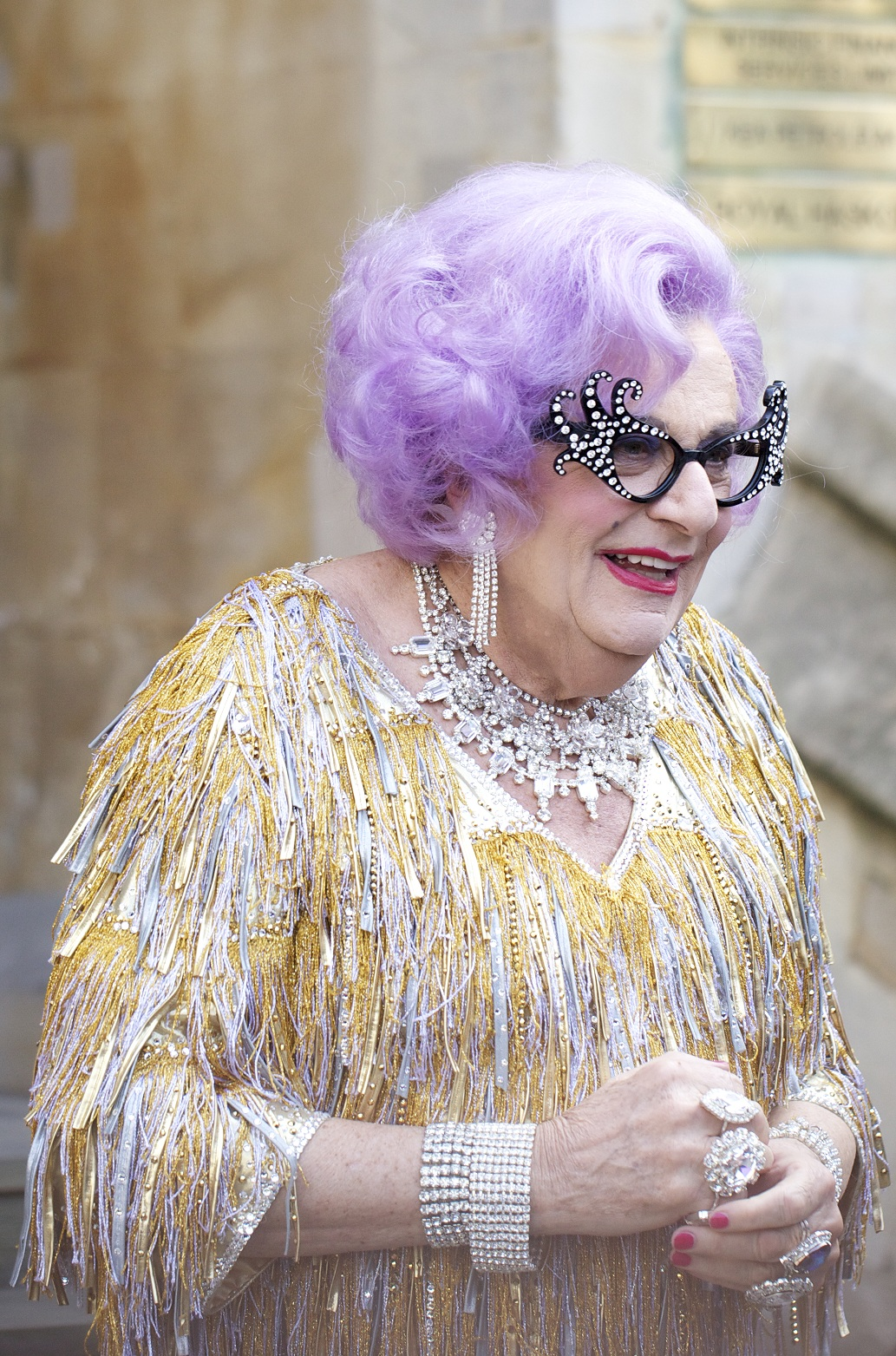
Humphries in character as "Dame Edna Everage" in 2011

=== Character creations ===
The satirical character creations of Barry Humphries include housewife and "gigastar" Dame Edna Everage; and "Australian cultural attaché to the Court of St James's" Sir Les Patterson, whose interests include boozing, chasing women and flatulence. Edna made her first appearance in a Melbourne University's UTRC revue at the end of 1955, as the city prepared for the 1956 Olympic Games. Humphries says his creations "encourage people to look at Australia critically and with affection and humour". Humphries first performed the Edna character to a London audience in 1969 and after initial bewilderment, British audiences came to adore the antipodean house-wife parody. Humphries honed the character to satirise vices from snobbery to celebrity-worship and later succeeded in the United States. For his delivery of dadaist and absurdist humour to millions, biographer Anne Pender described Humphries in 2010 as not only "the most significant theatrical figure of our time … [but] the most significant comedian to emerge since Charlie Chaplin".

Impersonators of the famous with wide followings have included Gerry Connolly, Max Gillies and Billy Birmingham (The Twelfth Man). Conolly's best known impersonation is of the Queen, while Gillies has made a career out of political impersonations on programs such as The Gillies Report and Birmingham has had success sending up well-known Australian sports commentators, notably Richie Benaud and the Channel Nine cricket commentary team. The flamboyant "Bob Downe" character is a cheesy, safari-suit-wearing lounge singer and exponent of camp humour. Elliot Goblet delivers quirky deadpan stand up. Representatives of the "bawdy" strain of Australian comedy include Rodney Rude and Austen Tayshus. Tayshus' first single "Australiana" became the biggest selling single in Australian recording history. A spoken word piece, it is filled with Australian puns:

Sittin' at home last Sunday mornin' me mate Boomerrang. Said he was havin' a few people around for a barbie, Said he might Kookaburra or two. I said, "Sounds great, will Wallaby there?" He said "Yeah and Vegemite come too". So I said to the wife "Do you wanna Goanna?". She said "I'll go if Dingos". So I said "Wattle we do about Nulla?" He said "Nullabors me to tears, leave him at home."

=== Song ===
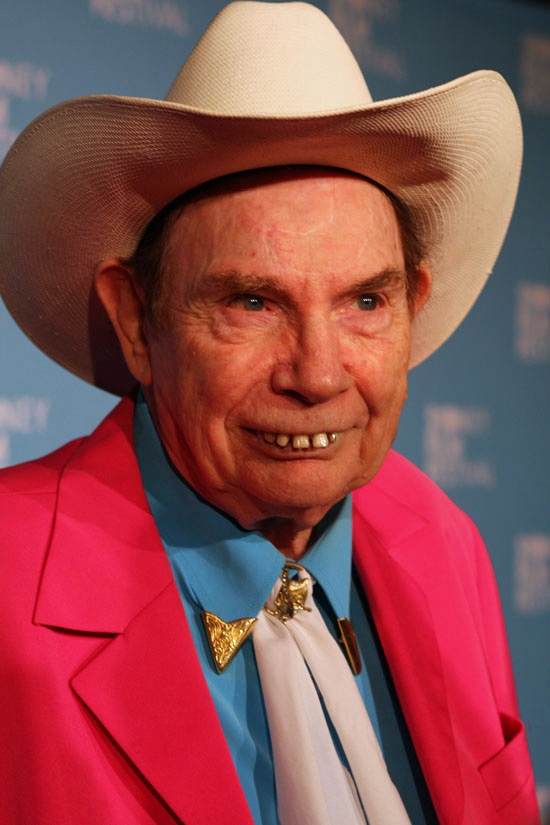
Chad Morgan, the Sheik of Scrubby Creek

Chad Morgan (The Sheik of Scrubby Creek) has been a popular exponent of vaudeville Australian country music for several decades. His songs are peppered with Australian slang: sheilas, drongos, dills and geezers. The breakthrough hits of leading Australian country music stars Slim Dusty and John Williamson might both be considered comic novelty songs: Dusty's "Pub With No Beer" (1957) and Williamson's "Old Man Emu" (1970). Dusty's hit was the first Australian single to reach the international pop charts. It begins with mock profundity:

It's a lonesome away, from your kindred and all
By the campfire at night, where the wild dingoes call –
But there's-a nothing so lonesome, morbid or drear,
Than to stand in the bar, of a pub with no beer

Williamson was influenced by Australian folk-singer, artist and broadcaster Rolf Harris and his novelty hit "Tie Me Kangaroo Down Sport". Harris built an extraordinarily successful career in Britain as a broadcaster and entertainer. "Tie Me Kangaroo Down Sport" is one of his many Australian themed comic hits and tells the sorry tale of a dying stockmen instructing his comrades on what to do upon his passing:

Tan me hide when I'm dead, Fred,
tan me hide when I'm dead.
So we tanned his hide when he died Clyde,
(Spoken) And that's it hanging on the shed.
Altogether now!

Popular novelty hits of recent decades have included The Twelfth Man (Billy Birmingham)'s sports commentary parody "Marvellous"; the Pauline Hanson send up "I Don't Like It" by Pauline Pantsdown; and the "bogan anthem" "Bloke" by tattooed, mulleted stand-up comic Chris Franklin.

=== Cinema ===
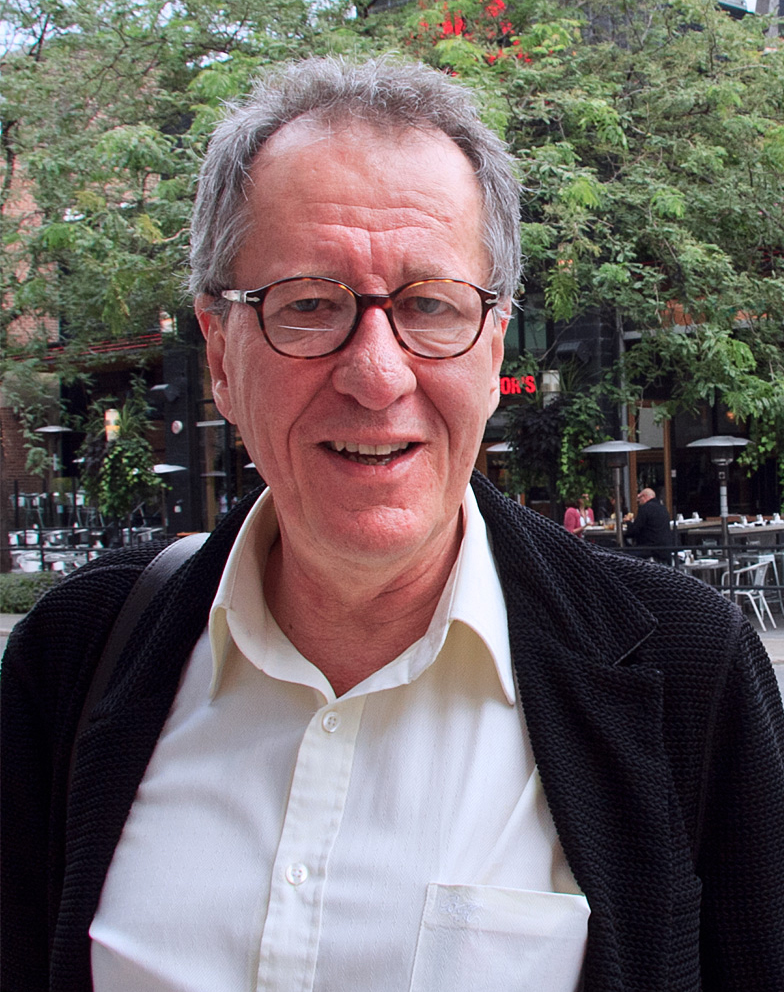
Geoffrey Rush

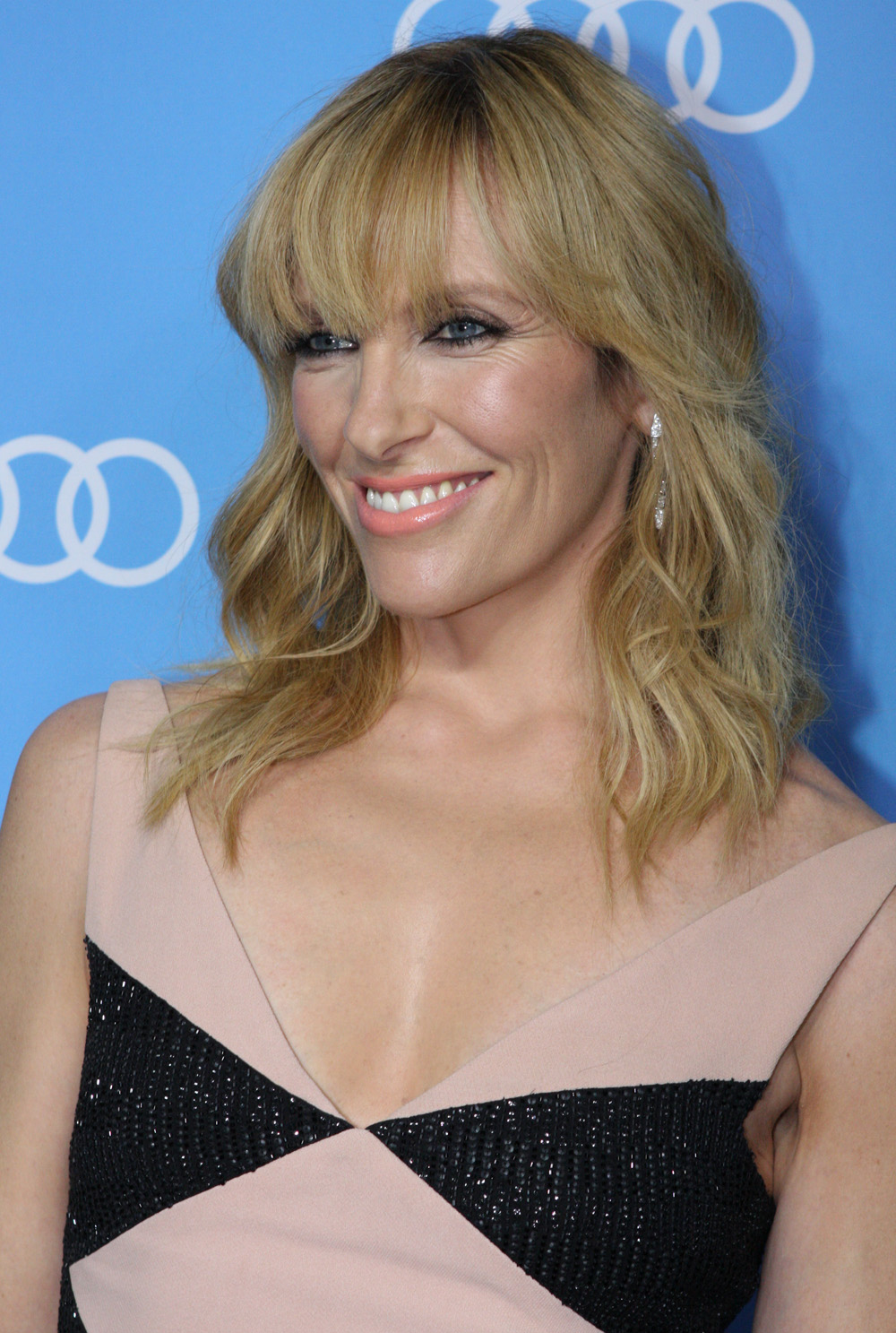
Toni Collette

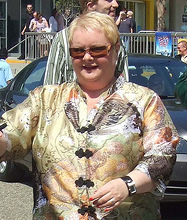
Magda Szubanski

The cinema of Australia has a long history and Australia was a pioneer in the production of feature films. Among early hits of Australian cinema were silent classics like Raymond Longford's The Sentimental Bloke (1919) and the Cinesound series of films based on Steele Rudd's Dad and Dave characters of the 1930s. A century of Australian film was marked in 1995 with an homage remake of Steele Rudd's On Our Selection featuring Joan Sutherland and some of Australia's most acclaimed character actors: Leo McKern, Geoffrey Rush and Noah Taylor.

Australians have a strong tradition of self-mockery in their comedy, from the outlandish Barry McKenzie expat-in-Europe movies of the 1970s, to the quirky outback characters of the Crocodile Dundee films of the 1980s and the Working Dog Productions' 1997 homage to suburbia The Castle.

Paul Hogan's Aussie bushman-in-New York/fish-out-of-water comedy romance Crocodile Dundee was a huge international hit – becoming the most successful foreign film ever released in the United States. Other than Hogan in the lead role, the film series features such veteran Australian comedic actors as John Meillon, David Gulpilil and Ernie Dingo. Australian cinema's all-time top-ten box-office hits include several other comedies: the barn yard animation Babe (1995), directed by Chris Noonan; George Miller's animation Happy Feet (2006); Baz Luhrmann's musical Moulin Rouge! (2001); Crocodile Dundee II (1988); Strictly Ballroom (1992); Rob Sitch's The Dish (2000); and Stephan Elliott's dragqueens-in-the-outback comedy drama The Adventures of Priscilla, Queen of the Desert (1994).

Other successes at the Australian box office include: 1966's They're a Weird Mob; the Alvin Purple and the Barry Humphries–Bruce Beresford Barry McKenzie movies of the 1970s (of the "Ozploitation" genre); 1987's Young Einstein; 1990's The Big Steal, 1992's Spotswood 1994's Muriel's Wedding; 1994's The Sum of Us; 1999's The Craic and Nick Giannopoulos' Wog Boy comedies. Clayton Jacobson's successful 2006 comedy debut Kenny, starring Shane Jacobson followed the life of a Melbourne plumber working for a corporate bathroom rental company called Splashdown. Crackerjack is a 2002 film starring Mick Molloy and Bill Hunter in which a wisecracking layabout (Molloy) joins a seniors lawn bowls club to be allowed to use a free parking space and discovers a villainous plot against the club. The 2009 clay-animation black comedy Mary and Max brought together the voices of Australian comic character actors Barry Humphries, Eric Bana and Toni Collette.

The 2006 comedy-drama Ten Canoes, directed by Rolf de Heer and Peter Djigirr, is notable for its setting in pre-European Australia.

=== Television ===
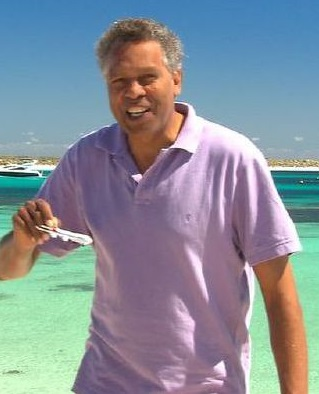
Ernie Dingo

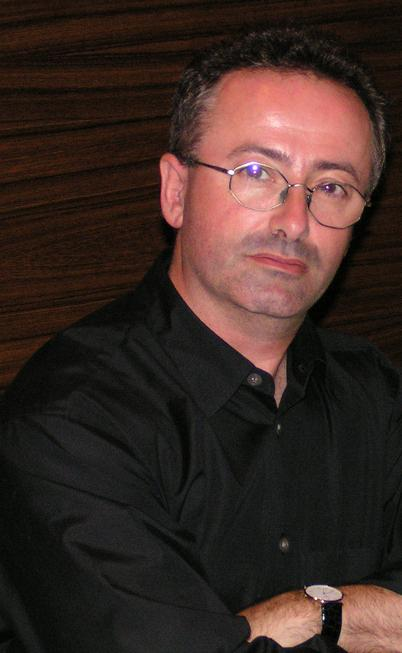
Andrew Denton

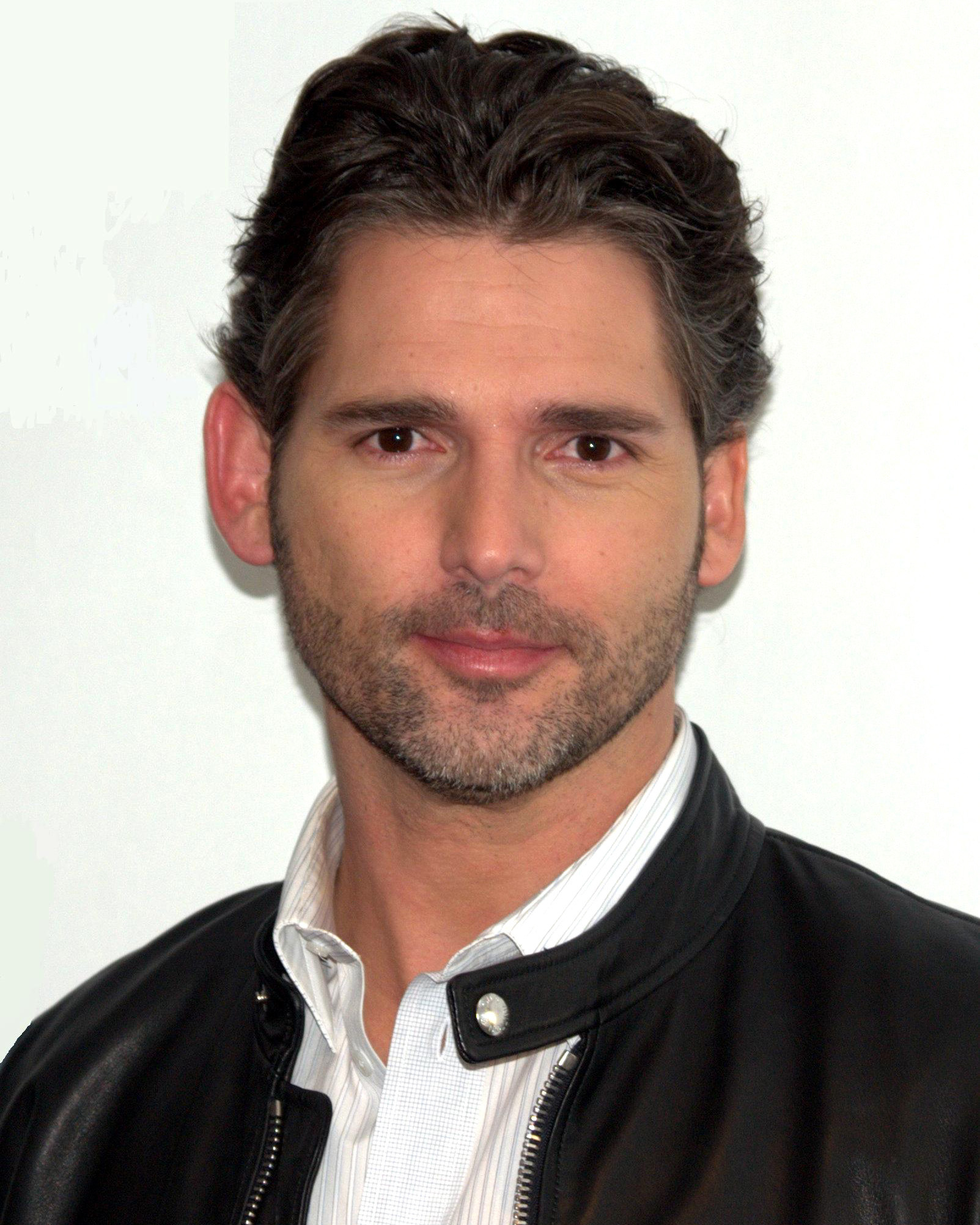
Eric Bana

The vaudeville talents of Graham Kennedy, Don Lane and Bert Newton earned popular success during the early years of Australian television. Kennedy hosted the groundbreaking In Melbourne Tonight (IMT) from 1957 to 1970, becoming known as "The King of Australian Comedy". He also hosted the popular innuendo-laden 1970s game show Blankety Blanks. His quick witted IMT offsider Bert Newton remains one of the most enduring comic talents of Australian television, presenting a string of programs and hosting the Logie Awards more often than any other presenter. The variety show Hey Hey It's Saturday, hosted by Daryl Somers screened for three decades and featured the ever-popular amateur comedian segment: "Red Faces" in which often bizarre and occasionally skilled acts would perform before celebrity judges.

My Name's McGooley, What's Yours? was a popular sitcom of the 1960s. Among the best loved Australian sitcoms was Mother & Son, about a divorcee (played by Garry McDonald) who had moved back into the suburban home of his mother (Ruth Cracknell). Sitcom Kingswood Country depicted the shifting face of Australia in the 1980s with bigoted patriarch "Ted" Bullpitt (Ross Higgins) having to come to terms with his migrant son-in-law. Acropolis Now further reflected the ongoing demographic changes, set amongst the inner working of a Greek Cafe with a cast of exaggerated "Aussie-Greeks": Nick Giannopoulos as "Jim" and Mary Coustas as the memorable "Effie". Ethnic humour also formed a central plank of the comedy in SBS television's offbeat Pizza TV series, which included regular Arab and Asian characters and presented pizza delivery in the suburbs of Sydney as "one of the most dangerous jobs in the world".

Nevertheless, sketch comedy rather than the sitcom formula has been a popular stalwart of Australian television. The Mavis Bramston Show and later The Naked Vicar Show and The Paul Hogan Show achieved great popularity in the 1970s. Notable programs of recent decades have included The Comedy Company in the 1980s, which featured the comic talents of Mary-Anne Fahey, Ian McFadyen, Mark Mitchell, Glenn Robbins, Kym Gyngell and others. The show focussed on suburban life with regular characters: the Greek fruit shop owner Con, the inarticulate and unemployed Col'n Carpenter, school girl Kylie Mole and elderly Uncle Arthur became household names. The shows catchphrases such as Con's "coupla days" and "bewdiful" entered the Australian vernacular. In August 1989, then Prime Minister Bob Hawke appeared in a The Comedy Company sketch with Mitchell on the premise of presenting Con with Australian citizenship. In reply to Con's question as to when Hawke was going to fix up the country, Hawke took delight in responding "a coupla days".

Growing out of Melbourne University and The D-Generation came The Late Show (1992–1993), starring the influential talents Santo Cilauro, Tom Gleisner, Jane Kennedy, Tony Martin, Mick Molloy and Rob Sitch; and during the 1980s and 1990s Fast forward (Steve Vizard, Magda Szubanski, Marg Downey, Michael Veitch, Peter Moon and others) and successor Full Frontal – which launched the career of Eric Bana and featured Shaun Micallef. The D-Gen team formed Working Dog Productions who have produced a string of hit films and television series, including the talk show The Panel, the mockumentary series Russell Coight's All Aussie Adventures and the improvisation comedy show Thank God You're Here.

Rove McManus is a three-time winner of the Gold Logie award as comedic host of his self-titled chat-variety show. The cerebral wit of such as Clive James, Clive Robertson and Andrew Denton has been employed to great acclaim in the talk-show interview style.

The Australian tradition of self-mockery runs thick in television comedy. The dysfunctional suburban mother–daughter sitcom Kath & Kim pokes fun at the accents and attitudes of Australian suburbia. Roy and HG provide an affectionate but irreverent parody of Australia's obsession with sport. The Dream with Roy and HG has been a regular feature of Olympic television coverage in Australia since the 2000 Sydney Olympics. Actor/writer Chris Lilley has produced a series of award-winning "mockumentary" style television series about ordinary Australian characters since 2005.

Cynical satire has had enduring popularity in Australian comedy. Rubbery Figures was a satirical rubber puppet series that screened in Australia in various forms from 1984 to 1990 and featured puppet caricatures of leading politicians and businesspeople. The Doug Anthony All Stars musical comedy group featured Paul McDermott, who later hosted the satirical news-based quiz show Good News Week. The television series Frontline lampooned the inner workings of Australia's "news and current affairs" TV journalism; The Hollowmen (2008) was set in the office of the Prime Minister's political advisory (spin) department. The Chaser's War on Everything cynically examines domestic and international politics. Satirists John Clarke and Bryan Dawe performed together in a long running mock-interview segment on ABC Television's current affairs flagship The 7:30 Report.

American series like M*A*S*H, Seinfeld, Friends and The Simpsons achieving devoted followings in Australia also British comedies suchas Fawlty Towers, Dad's Army, The Goodies, Blackadder and The Office.

=== Australian stand-up ===
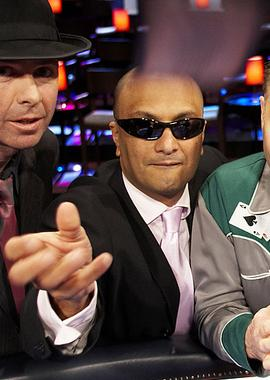
Akmal Saleh

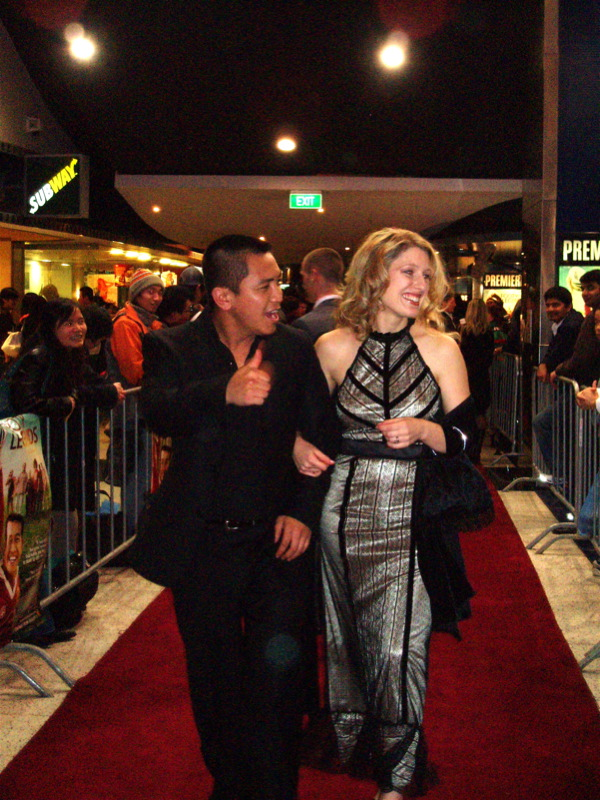
Anh Do (left)

Australian stand-up comedy is an important aspect of contemporary Australian comedy. Show-piecing the art is the Melbourne International Comedy Festival, which began in 1987 with Barry Humphries as patron and British comic Peter Cook as guest of honour and has grown to attract over 350,000 visitors annually. Stand-up is performed at live venues of all sizes across the nation – from small Pubs to major auditoria. Various television programs such as Hey Hey It's Saturday and Rove Live have provided additional exposure to stand-up comics.

Among the best known of contemporary comedy performers in Australia are Wil Anderson, Carl Barron, Jimeoin, Dave Hughes, Wendy Harmer, Peter Helliar, Russell Gilbert, Tony Martin, Jim Jefferies, Anh Do, Judith Lucy, Mick Molloy and Adam Hills.

=== Radio ===
Australian radio has long provided a popular outlet for Australian comedy, since the days of the vaudevillians like Roy Rene in the 1940s. In recent years, popular comedy DJ duos have included Roy & HG and Merrick and Rosso beginning on JJJ Radio and Martin/Molloy, Akmal and Kate Ritchie and the radio show Hamish & Andy on the commercial networks.

=== Cartoons ===
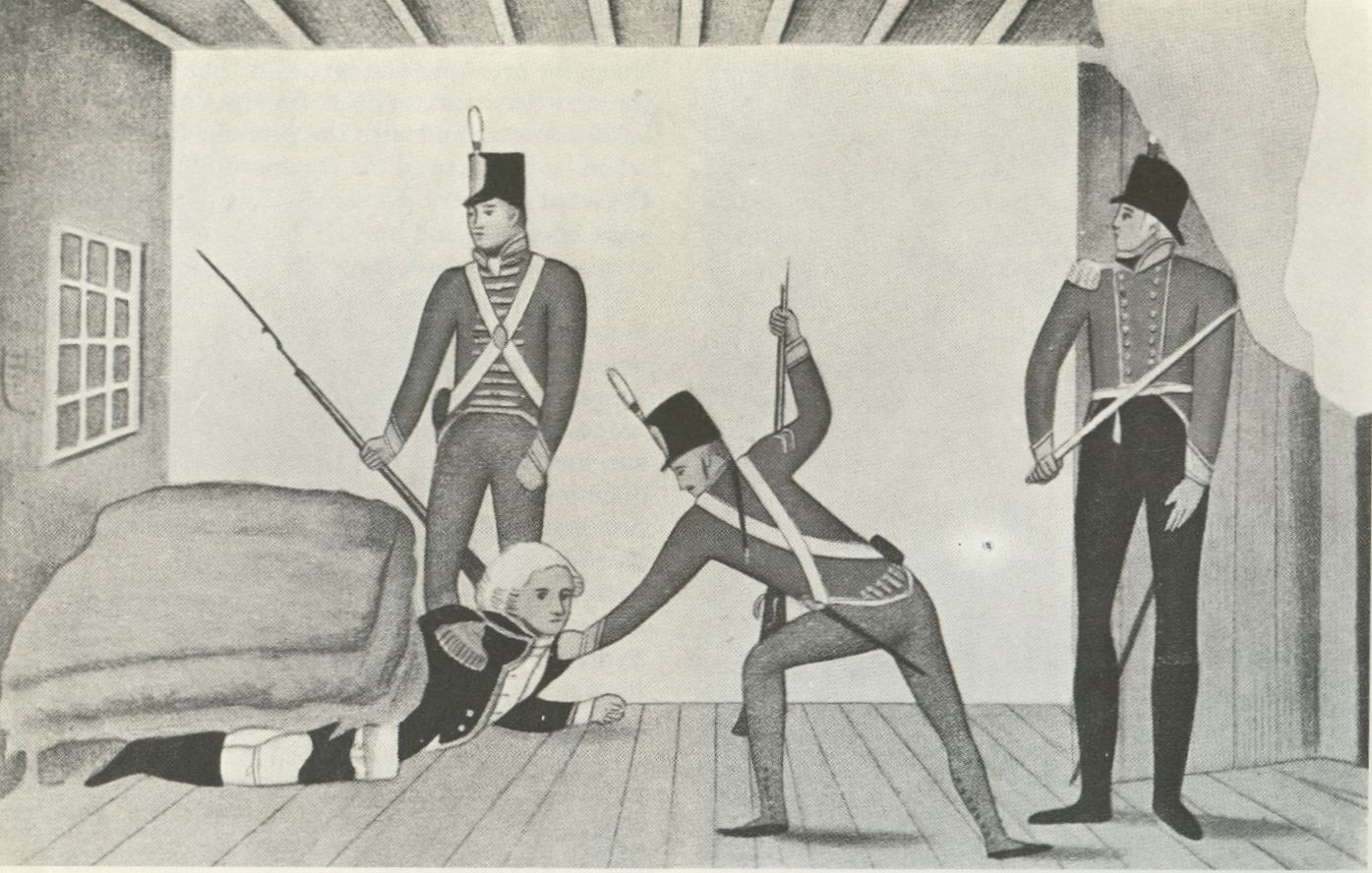
A political cartoon of the arrest of Governor William Bligh during the Rum Rebellion of 1808. The governor is depicted as a coward, hiding under his bed.

Australian cartoons have a long history dating back to colonial times. Political cartoons began appearing in Australian newspapers in the 1830s and The Bulletin magazine used political cartoons to great effect from the 1880s. Will Dyson took the Australian style of satirical cartooning to London before the First World War. Later internationally influential Australian cartoonists included Pat Oliphant and Paul Rigby. Ginger Meggs, a popular long-run Australian comic strip, was created in the early 1920s by Jimmy Bancks. The strip follows the escapades of a red-haired prepubescent mischief-maker who lives in an inner suburban working-class household. Stan Cross is famous for his iconic 1933 "For gorsake, stop laughing: this is serious!" cartoon.

Cartoons are today an integral part of political commentary and analysis in Australia. The lyrical cartoons of Michael Leunig provide a quirky take on social issues. Patrick Cook, Alan Moir, Warren Brown and Cathy Wilcox are prominent contemporary political cartoonists.

== Awards and festivals ==
The annual Melbourne International Comedy Festival (MICF) is one of the largest comedy festivals in the world, and a popular fixture on the city's cultural calendar. More recently The Sydney Comedy Festival and Brisbane Comedy Festival were launched.

Raw Comedy Award, supported primarily by the MICF and Triple J, is Australia's longest running and well-known national competition for emerging comedians. Heats are held annually around the country and the grand final is held in Melbourne during the festival and recorded for broadcast nationally on Australian Broadcasting Corporation television later in the year.

World's Funniest Island began as an Australian comedy event held on the third weekend in October on Cockatoo Island, on Sydney Harbour in 2009. The Bald Archy art prize (a parody of the Archibald Prize) includes cartoons or humorous works making fun of celebrities and current affairs and is allegedly "judged by a cockatoo".

The annual TV Week Logie Awards recognise television comedy in the category of "Most Popular Light Entertainment/Comedy" and the Australian Film Institute offers the annual Australian Film Institute Award for Best Television Comedy Series.

== Australian comedies and comedians ==
=== Notable comedians ===
- List of Australian comedians
- List of Australian stand-up comedians

=== Notable television comedies ===
See Australian Film Institute Award for Best Television Comedy Series

=== Notable film comedies ===
- The Adventures of Barry McKenzie
- The Adventures of Priscilla, Queen of the Desert
- Alvin Purple
- Babe
- Babe: Pig in the City
- Bad Boy Bubby
- Bad Eggs
- Barry McKenzie Holds His Own
- The Big Steal
- Bran Nue Dae
- The Cars That Ate Paris
- The Castle
- Crackerjack
- The Craic
- Crocodile Dundee
- Crocodile Dundee II
- The Crocodile Hunter: Collision Course
- On Our Selection
- Dirty Deeds
- The Dish
- Don's Party
- Gettin' Square
- He Died with a Felafel in His Hand
- Hercules Returns
- Kenny
- Malcolm
- Muriel's Wedding
- The Odd Angry Shot
- Spotswood
- Strictly Ballroom
- They're a Weird Mob
- Wog Boy 2: Kings of Mykonos

== See also ==
- List of Australian comedians
- Australian English
- Australian cinema
- Television in Australia
- Australian literature
- Australian culture
- Australian history
- Theatre in Australia
- Henry Hoke, the central character in a comedic look at invention in Australia
