= Pilbeam Theatre =

Indoor performance venue in Rockhampton

- The Pilbeam
- Interactive map of Pilbeam Theatre
- Location: 64B Victoria Parade, Rockhampton, Qld, 4700
- Coordinates: 23°22′22.8″S 150°30′33.119″E
- Owner: Rockhampton Regional Council
- Operator: Rockhampton Regional Council
- Capacity: 979

Construction
- Opened: 6 June 1979

The Pilbeam Theatre is an indoor performance venue in Rockhampton, Queensland, Australia.

== History ==
The Pilbeam Theatre was officially opened by Australian Governor-General Sir Zelman Cowen on 6 June 1979 and was named after the city's mayor at the time, Rex Pilbeam.

Located on the corner of Cambridge Street and Victoria Parade in the city directly opposite the Fitzroy River, the theatre was designed by local architect, Neil McKendry.

The venue has a maximum capacity of just under 1000 people.

A life-sized sculpture of explorer Charles Archer on his horse Sleipner, designed by Australian artist Arthur Murch, was installed in front of the theatre and unveiled in 1980.

A special seven-night program was held in the theatre's opening week with the opening night concert broadcast live on ABC Radio along with the ceremonial speeches. Anthony Doheny, a Rockhampton-born violinist featured on opening night as a soloist with the Queensland Symphony Orchestra.

== Notable performances ==
Early in his career, Australian film director Baz Luhrmann directed a community musical called Crocodile Creek at the Pilbeam Theatre in 1986, vision of which was unearthed by a film historian in 2014.

Among the many popular Australian musical artists that have used the Pilbeam Theatre over recent years have been Tina Arena, Guy Sebastian, Boy & Bear, Angus & Julia Stone, Kasey Chambers, Jimmy Barnes, Xavier Rudd, Lee Kernaghan, Melinda Schneider, Beccy Cole, Paul Kelly, Adam Harvey, Troy Cassar-Daley, Graeme Connors, Marina Prior and David Hobson.

Comedians who have performed at the theatre over recent years include Kitty Flanagan, Jimeoin, Carl Barron, Dave Hughes, Kevin Bloody Wilson, Arj Barker and Akmal Saleh.

It was reported in 2015 that Carl Barron holds the record for the fastest selling adult show in the Pilbeam Theatre's history.

Akmal Saleh was scheduled to perform at the Pilbeam Theatre again in 2011, with proceeds from the show destined for the victims of the 2010-11 Queensland floods. However, he cancelled the show after claiming he had received threats from local residents, following his controversial comments about Rockhampton on Network Ten's Good News Week in 2009 when he said the city should be removed from Australia and relocated to Afghanistan. Saleh claimed he was angry after being assaulted and racially abused by a woman who had accused of being a paedophile after allegedly observing Saleh film children on an amusement ride at the 2009 Rockhampton Show while Saleh and two friends, including Joel Ozborn, were filming a "Borat-esque" skit dressed in traditional Arabian outfits.

Rockhampton Regional Council also uses the Pilbeam Theatre to host their Morning Melodies concerts for senior citizens which has attracted notable Australian performers including Lucky Starr, Kamahl, Rhonda Burchmore, Ian Stenlake, Little Pattie, James Blundell, Rachael Beck and Karen Knowles.

Flamboyant Australian entertainer Peter Allen infamously damaged the Pilbeam Theatre's Steinway piano by dancing atop of it during a concert in 1980.

== Special events ==
Along with numerous musical, cultural and comedic performances, the Pilbeam Theatre has also hosted a number of special events.

This includes a three-day sitting of Queensland Parliament in 2005, prompting strict security measures to be employed around the venue. The cost of holding the parliamentary sitting at the Pilbeam Theatre in Rockhampton also attracted criticism.

ABC Television's Q&A program hosted by Tony Jones was broadcast live from the Pilbeam Theatre in 2014, featuring a panel of guests which included Patrick McGorry, Josh Thomas and Bob Katter.

The Pilbeam Theatre has also hosted auditions for reality talent programs, Australian Idol and The X Factor.
