= Moosehead Awards =

Australian comedy awards

The Moosehead Awards, formerly The Brian McCarthy Memorial Moosehead Awards and commonly known as The Mooseheads, are awards given to performers at the Melbourne International Comedy Festival, although it is not an official part of the festival.

== Background ==
The award is named after Brian McCarthy, a young comedian, actor, and fringe comedy producer killed in a car accident in 1987 aged 23. He had previously studied drama at Rusden College, was one of the early practitioners of improv in Melbourne, and ran fringe comedy events at a pub in Collingwood to provide a platform for young comedians. He was a performer at the inaugural Melbourne Comedy Festival in 1987.

The Brian McCarthy Memorial Trust was established in 1987 by friends of McCarthy, and is the source of the Moosehead grant, which is issued to Australian comedians wishing to premiere new works as part of the Melbourne International Comedy Festival (MICF).

== Description ==
The Trust aims to support working comedians, whose shows are "innovative, unusual, and often ill-advised". The awards are known as the Mooseheads because Moosehead beer was McCarthy's favourite.

Each year benefit performances (Moosehead Awards Benefit) are held in Melbourne on the final night of MICF each year. The lineup for the show is kept secret by tradition. McCarthy's favourite song, "I Heard It Through the Grapevine", is traditionally performed by the closing act of every Moosehead Award benefit show.

In the past (2006–2010?) the award also received sponsorship from The Comedy Channel.

The award is open to emerging working comedians who are Australian permanent residents and currently performing to small audiences. The selection committee changes each year, and comprises managers, producers, festival programming staff, and comedians.

To the winner of a Moosehead, the Brian McCarthy Memorial Trust pays the MICF registration fee, the first A$3,000 of their venue rental, up to A$2,500 for creative support around the show, and up to A$2,000 towards accommodation costs if the recipient lives outside of Melbourne.

== Award recipients ==
The Mooseheads alumni include Judith Lucy, Lano & Woodley, Tom Ballard, Laura Davis, David Quirk, Kate McLennan, Hannah Gadsby, Anthony Morgan, Dave O'Neil, Alan Brough, and Corinne Grant.

Other past recipients include:

- 1994: Stef Torok & Brad Oakes - Telephoney Men
- 1995: Andrew Goodone - He, Comedian
- 1996: Tim Harris - An Illustrated Lecture by Dr Alexander Buchanan; The Rhonda Movement - Dumhead; Denise Scott - Life of the Party
- 1997: Jim Lawson & Trevor Major - Bega Than Cheesus; Miss Itchy - I Can't Stop Burrowing; Alan Brough - Generation XXL
- 1998: Crazy E - The Madness Tour; Adam Richard - Tragedy; Meshel Laurie - The Virgin Mary 2 - This Time It's Personal
- 1999: Tim Harris - The Neville Chamberlin show; Corinne Grant - Waiting for Munro; The 4 Noels - The Magnificent Seventeen
- 2000: Damian Callinan & Lawrence Mooney - Out and About; Gerard McCulloch - An Englishman An Irishman and a Sootsman Walk Into a Documentary; Emotional People - Rockothello
- 2001: Kim Hope - Sing Your Arse Off; Stephen Hall & Michael Ward - I Said, I Said
- 2002: Claire Bartholomew - One Man's Business; Scott Brennan - Glen Bush Teenage Superstar; Barfoot & Cantone
- 2003: Sam Simmons - The Steve Promise Story; John Knowles - Saddle Sore; Fiona Harris and Katrina Mathers - Footy Chicks
- 2004: Damian Clark - The Bandit; Krisztian Bagin - The Beginning and End of Fin Begin; Monica Dullard's Concert After Tea
- 2005: Gavin Baskerville - As Seen on TV; Rebecca De Unamuno - Open to Suggestion; Tanya Losanno - Trophy Wife
- 2006: Richard McKenzie - Digger; Penny Tangey - Kathy Smith Goes to Maths Camp; Damian Callinan - Spazznuts
- 2007: Justin Hamilton in Three Colours Hammo; Alison Bice in The Wizard of Bice; Amelia Jane Hunter is Keith Flipp (The Girl from Belkendowns Flat)
- 2008: Sammy J in the Forest of Dreams (with Heath McIvor); The Axis of Awesome Comeback Spectacular!; Meat the Musical (Hannah Gadsby and Amelia Jane Hunter); Allsopp & Henderson‘s The Jinglists
- 2009: Asher Treleaven - Open Door; Wes Snelling in Kiosk; Dave Bloustien - The Social Contract; Lou Sanz - Who Is Priscilla Irving?
- 2010: Adrian Calear - Code Grey; Sam Simmons & David Quirk - The Incident; Steve Sheehan - Stevl Shefn and His Translator Fatima
- 2015: David Quirk – Thrasher; Jonestown – Guinea Pigs

== See also ==
- List of Australian comedians
- Melbourne International Comedy Festival
