= Henry Hoke =

Henry Hoke may refer to:

- Henry Hoke (author), American author
- Henry Hoke (fictional inventor), a fictitious Australian scientist, engineer, and inventor
