= Filthy Rich and Homeless =

- Narrated by: Colin Friels
- Country of origin: Australia
- Original language: English
- No. of seasons: 3
- No. of episodes: 9

Production
- Editors: Steven Robinson; Mark Atkin
- Running time: 60 minutes

Original release
- Network: SBS
- Release: 27 June 2017

Filthy Rich and Homeless is an Asian Academy Creative Awards-nominated Australian TV documentary series produced by Blackfella Films and broadcast in 2017 (Season 1) and 2018 (Season 2) on SBS.

The series follows five wealthy Australians who swap their life of privilege for homelessness.

== Series overview ==
=== Season 1 ===
The five participants were self-made millionaire Tim Guest; Kayla Fenech, daughter of boxing champion Jeff Fenech; rags to riches beauty entrepreneur Jellaine Dee; third generation pub baron Stu Laundy; and model and Sydney socialite Christian Wilkins, son of television presenter Richard Wilkins.

=== Season 2 ===
The five participants were socialite Skye Leckie, wife of media company executive director David Leckie; actor-broadcaster Cameron Daddo; author Benjamin Law; politician and activist Alex Greenwich; and Instagram star Alli Simpson.

=== Season 3 ===
The five participants were Dr. Andrew Rochford, Deputy Lord Mayor of Melbourne Arron Wood, Restaurateur Pauline Nguyen, Comedian Ciaran Lyons, and Model Ellie Gonsalves.

== See also ==
- Go Back to Where You Came From
- First Contact
