= Steven Robinson (film editor) =

Australian film editor

Steven Robinson is an Australian film editor, who works in drama and documentary, features and television. He has won two AACTA/AFI awards for Best Editing and is notable for his work on the Kath & Kim comedy series and the feature film Kath & Kimderella (2012) and the feature documentary John Farnham Finding the Voice (2023)

He won the AACTA award for Best Editing on the feature documentary In the Shadow of the Hill (2016) and the AFI Award for Best Editing for Inside the Firestorm (2010), and Best Editing at the Australian Screen Editors Awards for Choir of Hard Knocks (2007). He won Best Editing at the 2023 Valencia International Film Festival - Cinema Jove for the Comedy-Drama Web Series “Triple Oh !” He has been nominated ten times for Best Editing at the Australian Screen Editors Awards.

Other significant credits include:

- Putuparri and the Rainmakers (feature documentary)
- First Contact, Alone Australia (factual series)
- It's a Date "Whatever Happened to that Guy"; "Driven Crazy" (comedy series)
- M.D.A., Silversun, Bed of Roses, "Neighbours" "Something in the Air" (drama series)
- Da Kath & Kim Code (television feature film)
- "Frank & Jerry" (independent comedy feature film)

Year	Film	Notes
1989	Pesto: A Death Sentence	Short film. Also Director & Writer with John Nicoll
1990	The Magistrate	International drama min-series starring Franco Nero
1991	The Monk, the Princes and the Forest	60 min Documentary ABC Natural History Unit
1992	Wombats: Bulldozers of the Bush	30 min Documentary ABC Natural History Unit
1993	Attitude	Youth Current Affairs Program ABC Television
1993	MRA 15th Anniversary Toy Run	Documentary for the Motorcycle Riders Association. Also Director & Writer
1994	TVTV	Media & Pop Culture Magazine Program
1995	World Regional Geography	Open Learning ABC TV Education Unit Also Producer & Writer
1995	Bookchat	Arts Magazine Program ABC Television Also Field Producer
1996	Recovery	Youth Magazine Program ABC Television Segment Editor
1996	Home Truths	Documentary Series ABC TV Feature
1997	Rule 61: The Case Against Radovan Karadzic	Feature Documentary
1998	They Shoot Crocodiles Don’t They?	60 min. Documentary ABC Natural History Unit
1998	Driven Crazy	Children's Drama Series
1999	Eye of the Storm: Monsoon	60 min. Documentary ABC Natural History Unit
1999	Survival of the Species	3 x 30 min. Documentaries Dept.of Education, Employment & Training Also Director & Writer
2000	Something in the Air Season 1	Drama Series ABC Television
2001	Something in the Air Season 2	Drama Series ABC Television
2001	Kath & Kim Season 1	Comedy Series ABC Television
2002	MDA Season 1	Drama Series. ABC Television
2002	The Art of Bill Henson	Documentary ABC Television Arts.
2003	Inside the Square	Documentary ABC Television Arts.
2003	KISS Symphony	Music Concert ABC Arts Television
2003	From the Heart: The Kimberleys	Documentary ABC Natural History Unit
2003	MDA Season 2	Drama Series ABC Television
2003	The Company You Keep	Documentary ABC Television
2003	Kath & Kim Season 2	Comedy Series ABC Television
2004	Made in Heaven	Documentary ABC Television
2004	Silversun	Drama Series. ABC Television
2004	Kath & Kim Season 3	Comedy Series ABC Television
2005	Outback House	Documentary Series ABC Television
2005	MDA Season 3	Drama Series ABC Television
2005	Da Kath & Kim Code	Television Feature Film
2006	Dusty: Little by Little	Documentary Series ABC Television Also Associate Producer
2006	Beyond the Backyard	Documentary ABC Television
2007	Choir of Hard Knocks	Documentary Series ABC TV Winner Best Editing 2077 Australian Screen Editor
2008	Menzies & Churchill at War	Drama-Documentary
2008	Monash: The Forgotten Anzac	Drama-Documentary
2008	Embedded with the Murri Mob	Documentary SBS TV
2008	Whatever Happened to That Guy?	Comedy Series Foxtel
2008	Kath & Kim Season 4	Comedy TV Series
2009	Alone in a Crowded Room	Documentary ABC Television
2009	Bed of Roses Season 2	Drama Series ABC Television
2009	The Trial	Also Co-Writer Documentary SBS TV Nominated Best Editing Australian Screen Editor
2009	Inside the Firestorm	Feature Documentary Winner Best Editing 2010 AFI Awards Nominated Best Editing Australian Screen Editor
2010	Frank & Jerry	Feature Film
2010	Penguin Island	Documentary Series ABC Television
2010	The Ball	Documentary ABC TV Nominated Best Editing Australian Screen Editor
2010	Charles Bean’s Great War	Drama-Documentary
2010	Bed of Roses Season 3	Drama Series ABC Television
2011	Donydji	Short Documentary Also Director, Writer & Cinematographer
2011	The Family	Documentary Series SBS TV
2011	Neighbours	Drama Series Channel 10
2012	Gallipoli from Above	Documentary ABC Television
2012	Kath & Kimderella	Feature Film
2012	Dirty Business: How Mining Made Australia	Documentary Series SBS TV
2013	Possum Wars	Documentary Series ABC TV
2013	Slide Show	Sketch Comedy Series Channel 7 Television
2013	It’s a Date Season 1	Comedy Series Nominated Best Editing Australian Screen Editor
2013	Dancing with the Stars	Reality Series
2014	Little Stars	Feature Documentary
2014	First Contact Season 1	Documentary Series SBS TV
2015	Open Slather	Sketch Comedy Series - Foxtel
2015	Sperm Donors Anonymous	Documentary SBS TV Nominated Best Editing Australian Screen Editor
2015	Putuparri and the Rainmakers	Feature Documentary Nominated Best Editing Australian Screen Editor
2016	Long Lost Family	Documentary Series Channel 10
2016	DNA Nation	Documentary Series SBS TV Nominated Best Editing Australian Screen Editor
2016	First Contact Season 2	Documentary Series SBS TV
2016	In the Shadow of the Hill	Feature Documentary Winner Best Editing AACTA Awards 2016 Nominated Best Editing Australian Screen Editor
2017	Filthy Rich & Homeless Season 1	Documentary Series SBS TV Nominated Best Editing Australian Screen Editor
2017	Heroes	Documentary ABC Television
2017	From Music into Silence	Feature Documentary
2018	Filthy Rich & Homeless Season 2	Documentary Series SBS TV
2018	Outback Rabbis	Feature Documentary
2018	Nolan: Australia’s Maverick Artist	Documentary ABC TV
2018	Every Family has a Secret	Documentary Series SBS TV
2019	House Rules Season 7	Reality Series
2019	Secrets of Our Cities : Footscary	Documentary Series SBS TV
2019	Filthy Rich & Homeless Season 3	Documentary Series SBS TV Nominated Best Editing Australian Screen Editor
2019	Playing For Keeps Season 2	Drama Series Channel 10
2020	Lady Lash	Short Documentary
2020	Addicted Australia	Documentary Series SBS TV
2020	Wild Things	Feature Documentary Nominated Best Sound AACTA Awards 2020
2021	Conquering Cancer	Feature Documentary
2021	Books That Made Us	Documentary Series SBS TV
2022	The Endangered Generation ?	Feature Documentary
2022	I Am Kanaka	Short Documentary
2023	Meet the Neighbours	Documentary Series SBS TV
2023	Triple Oh!	Comedy/Drama Web Series Winner Best Series & Best Editing 2023 Valencia International Film Festival - Cinema Jove
2023	Alone Australia	Documentary Series SBS TV
2023	John Farnham Finding the Voice	Feature Documentary Winner Best Documentary AACTA Awards 2024
2024	Welcome to Yiddishland	Feature Documentary Also Co-Writer Premiere Sydney Film Festival 2024
2024	Killjoy	Feature Documentary
