= Col Elliott =

Australian comedian

Col Elliott (born 1949) is an English-born Australian stand-up comedian who has been active since the early 1970s, based mainly on character-based comedy. He has released more than 20 albums, 6 DVDs and many performances in thousands of live shows.

== Charting discography ==
=== Albums ===
List of albums, with Australia chart positions
| Title | Album details | Peak chart positions |
| Title | Album details | AUS |
|---|---|---|
| Hey You Bloody Mug | Released: October 1982; Format: LP; Label: Sundown (SUN0020) | 56 |

=== Singles ===
List of singles, with selected chart positions
| Year | Title | Peak chart positions |
| Year | Title | AUS |
|---|---|---|
| 1983 | "Gotta Give the Grog Away" | 29 |

== Awards ==
=== Mo Awards ===
The Australian Entertainment Mo Awards (commonly known informally as the Mo Awards), were annual Australian entertainment industry awards. They recognise achievements in live entertainment in Australia from 1975 to 2016. Col Elliott won two awards in that time.

| Year | Nominee / work | Award | Result (wins only) |
|---|---|---|---|
| 1995 | Col Elliott | Variety Comedy Performer of the Year | Won |
| 1996 | Col Elliott | Variety Comedy Performer of the Year | Won |
