= Dave Bloustien =

Australian comedian

Comedy career
- Medium: stand-up, impro, television (as writer)
- Subjects: Africa, celebrity, violence, law, philosophy
- Website: http://bloustien.com

Dave Bloustien (born 7 December 1975, in Adelaide) is an Australian comedian, improviser and comedy writer.

Living and working in Sydney, New South Wales, Bloustien has written for many Australian television comedies, including ABC's The Glass House, The Sideshow and Randling, and Channel Ten's Good News Week. He has won five Australian Writers Guild awards, or AWGIES, for his work on Good News Week.

As a stand-up comedian and improviser Bloustien has performed across Australia and internationally, including many shows as part of the Melbourne International Comedy Festival, Edinburgh Fringe Festival, Adelaide Fringe Festival, Cracker Comedy Festival and New Zealand Comedy Festival. In 2009 he was a recipient of a Moosehead Award for The Social Contract, an account of how a client tried to sue him on the grounds that his act wasn't funny. His more recent shows include the "improvised rumble" Puppy Fight Social Club, A Complete History of Western Philosophy and Dave Bloustien's Grand Guignol.

Bloustien is also founder and co-producer of Sydney-based comedy production company Wit Large.
