= Jenny Talia =

Australian comedian and singer

- Also known as: T.J. Dennis
- Born: Tammy-Jo Bryant
- Origin: Kalgoorlie, Western Australia, Australia
- Genres: Comedy, country
- Occupations: Singer-songwriter, entertainer
- Instruments: Vocals, guitar
- Label: Both Barrels
- Website: jennytalia.com

Jenny Talia (born as Tammy-Jo Bryant) is an Australian-born U.S.–based comedy singer-songwriter. She also performs country music as T. J. Dennis. Talia is the daughter of Kevin Bloody Wilson, an Australian comedian and entertainer, for whom she is an occasional support act. Her comedy is similar in style to her father's but is from a female perspective. Talia, originally from Kalgoorlie, relocated to Nashville in 1999 and has been based in Chicago where she lives with her husband and children.

Her stage name is a play on the word "genitalia".

== Biography ==
Jenny Talia was born as Tammy-Jo Bryant and grew up in Kalgoorlie. Her father is Kevin Bloody Wilson (born as Dennis Bryant in 1947), a comedian and entertainer, who also performed as Bryan Dennis; her mother is Betty. They married in 1970 and besides Talia, they have a son, Travis Bryant, who became a pilot.

From 1996, Talia released three country music albums as T. J. Dennis. She toured Australia, New Zealand, and the United Kingdom and occasionally performed shows in the United States. Her debut album, My Way ... or no Way at All (1996), was issued on the Both Barrels Music label based in Perth. For the recording sessions she used Martin Jenner, Lucky Oceans and Denise DeMarchi. In June 1999 she performed at Nashville's Fun Fair. Her third country music album, Tjdennis.com (2000), was recorded in that city.

Talia described how she evolved from straight forward country music to bawdy comedy, when first living in Nashville, "I did gigs around town and I was always asked to play an Australian song. For me, the first 'Australian' song that popped into my head was always one of my Dad's... I would change the words around a bit and make it from a girl's point of view. This quickly took on a life of its own and within months, I had written and recorded a comedy album, which went on to outsell my three previous country albums in a matter of months. I joined Dad on a 72-date tour of Europe as his opening act, which turned out to be a huge success." Her first album as a comedian was Jenny Talia from Australia in 2003.

In June 2014, Talia issued her fifth comedy album, F.O.C.U.S (Fuck Off 'Cause You're Stupid), which Brooke Hunter of femail.com.au described as "an apt representation of the way [she] approaches life, and the inspiration behind her songs. She melds quirky themes, tongue-in-cheek situations and a down-to-earth approach, her tracks mirror the ridiculous realities of life." In August 2016 she supported her father on his second farewell tour of Australia.

== Discography ==
T. J. Dennis

- My Way... or no Way at All (1996) Both Barrels Music
- T J's Diner was Released in 1998
- Tjdennis.com (2000) Both Barrels Music

Jenny Talia

- Jenny Talia from Australia (2003) Both Barrels Music
- Tunnel Vision (2004) Both Barrels Music
- Without Adult Supervision (10 July 2007) Tamado Music
- The Blonde Leading the Blonde (1 September 2009)
- F.O.C.U.S. (Fuck Off 'Cause You're Stupid) was released on September 4, 2012.
- Christmas was officially released on October 1, 2014.
- Jenny Talia's Greatesthits! (alternately titled Greatest Hits!) was released in 2016 and was a compilation album
- Whiskey Dick (2019)
- Jenny In A Bottle (01/10/2023, according to Deezer)
- Champ was released on October 17, 2025.
