= Anyone for Tennis? =

Two-man Australian musical comedy band

- Also known as: AFT?
- Origin: Melbourne, Australia
- Genres: Comedy; Musical comedy Sketch comedy
- Years active: 2005–2012
- Members: Andrew (Doody) Doodson (vocals, guitar); Jason English-Rees (guitar, vocals)

Anyone for Tennis? was a two-man Australian musical comedy band, writing team and performance duo. Before splitting up in 2012, the two created musical comedy, video sketches, and stand-up comedy routines.

== History ==
Anyone for Tennis? (Andrew (Doody) Doodson & Jason English-Rees) formed in 2005 while studying advertising at RMIT University in Melbourne. After working in the Melbourne advertising industry together for just over 3 years and winning an MADC award the creative team downed pens and pads and began as a full-time comedy duo in 2006. They played around the Australian comedy scene for a while but it was not until 2007 when they made it through to the national final of the Raw Comedy Award, a nationwide open mic competition, that they started to get widely recognized on the mainstream comedy scene.

Anyone for Tennis? performed shows in the Melbourne International Comedy Festival, recorded an EP 'Acey Deucey' and released numerous YouTube clips including 'Let's get Famous', a parody of the famous OK Go treadmill video. Anyone for Tennis recorded their first and only full-length album in June 2011 titled "Prepare to be tuned" which is a live recording of the 2011 Melbourne and Edinburgh Comedy Festival show of the same name.

As a writing team Andrew Doodson and Jason English-Rees contributed material to numerous Melbourne publications such as Melbourne street press Beat Magazine, and wrote comedy sketches for Channel 31 comedy variety programme Planet Nerd in which they also appeared.

== Live shows ==
Year	Show Details
2007	RAW Comedy National Final – Melbourne International Comedy Festival
2008	Take Your Time – Melbourne International Comedy Festival
2009	CUTTHROAT – Melbourne International Comedy Festival, Melbourne Fringe Festival
2009	Music, Mirth & Mayhem, Mirabel – Kids Benefit – Melbourne International Comedy Festival
2010	Abacus Birdcage Gramophone Lamp – Melbourne International Comedy Festival
2011	Prepare To Be Tuned – Melbourne International Comedy Festival, Edinburgh Festival Fringe, Melbourne Fringe Festival
2011	Anyone For Tennis? at the Butterfly Club
2011	The Polyphonic Comic Frolic – Melbourne Fringe Festival

== Musical releases ==
- Very PE (Single) (2005)
- Coincidentally Ramsey Street (single) (2006)
- Bad Morning (single) (2008)
- Acey Deucey! EP (2008)
- Five Pence ('Five Cent', Aus' Title) (single) (2009)
- Marg (single) (2008)
- My Future Wife (Single) (2010)
