= Mark Trenwith =

Australian comedian

Mark Trenwith is a Melbourne-based Australian comedian and actor. He played "Bounce Back Man" in the ABC television series Being Me and starred alongside Adelaide comedian Big Al in comedy show Give Us A Hug at the 2006 Adelaide Fringe Festival. He won the Adelaide Comedian of the Year and the People's Choice Award at the 2010 Adelaide Comedy Awards.
