= Joel Ozborn =

Australian comedian

Joel Ozborn is an Australian comedian. He's the former road manager for The Amazing Johnathan.

== Biography ==
When Ozborn was in high school he won a public-speaking competition; he also won the 1998 "Street performer Of The Year", presented by the Sydney Opera House live on 2Day FM.

Ozborn is also known to have travelled and performed with Akmal Saleh and American comedian Arj Barker in a sellout season of Sydney shows. In 2006, he took part in the Adelaide Fringe Festival, Sydney Cracker Comedy Festival, and the Melbourne International Comedy Festival. Ozborn also performed at the 2007 Adelaide Fringe Festival, the Melbourne International Comedy Festival, and continued the rest of the year on another national theatre tour. In 2008, Ozborn was back at the Adelaide Fringe Festival, the Sydney Cracker Festival, and a sold-out season of shows at the Melbourne International Comedy Festival.

Ozborn is known for his professional and personal relationship with the world renowned comedian/magician The Amazing Johnathan.

Ozborn recalls, “When I was a 12-year-old kid my dad took me to see The Amazing Johnathan in Sydney and I had no idea what to expect and I was just blown away. It was an experience I’d never had before. . . Because I’d never experienced the roar of an audience like that before."

Johnathan was impressed with Ozborn's tenacity and dedication, and he helped mentor Ozborn for several years as Johnathan's career in Australia was flourishing. Johnathan decided to settle in Australia and marries his first wife. At 19 years old, Ozborn had become Johnathan's manager, with Johnathan recognizing Ozborn's dedication and organisational skills. After securing a nightly Vegas set, Johnathan was making US$40,000–$50,000 per week from merchandising sales alone. After accomplishing everything Ozborn wanted to do with Johnathan, Ozborn dabbled in prop-based comedy magic —like Johnathan—before pivoting to stand-up comedy.

Ozborn continued to headline comedy clubs across the Australia until the COVID-19 pandemic devastated the live performing arts industry. Like many comedians and magicians, Ozborn responded by doing live virtual performances for his clients. He continues to perform in theatres and comedy clubs around the world.
