= George Smilovici =

Australian comedian

George Smilovici is a Cuban-born Australian comedian. He is the son of Romanian-Jewish immigrant parents who left Romania and first settled in Cuba, from 1946 till 1959 when they fled Fidel Castro's revolution to El Salvador, and Guatemala, and later moved to Sydney, Australia when Smilovici was 6 years old. Smilovici is best known for his comic monologue "I'm Tuff”, which peaked at number 1 on the Australian singles chart knocking off Stevie Wonder.

== Discography ==
=== Studio albums ===
List of albums
Title	Album details
Son of Tuff... Wimp	Released: 1985; Format: LP; Label: Mushroom (L 27162)
Uncensored	Released: 1985; Format: LP; Label: Festival (L 38307)
Hot	Released: 1990; Format: CD; Label: Polydor (CDBC1)

=== Singles ===
List of singles, with selected chart positions
Year	Title	Peak chart positions
Year	Title	AUS
1984	"I'm Tuff"	10
1985	"Popularity"	—
1985	"Spewing"	—
1985	"Beyond Tuff"	—
1990	"Happiest Man"	—
