= Reuben Solo =

Australian comedian

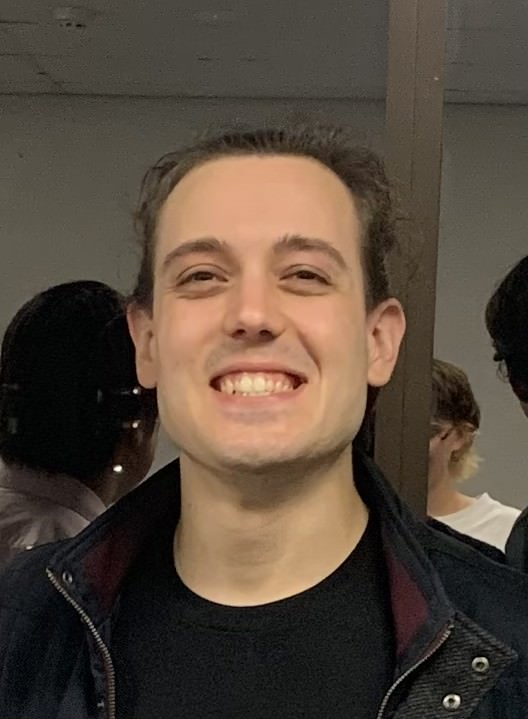
- Solo in May 2023
- Born: 26 January 1997 (age 29); Melbourne, Australia

Comedy career
- Years active: 2020–present
- Medium: Stand-up; sketch
- Website: reubensolo.com

Reuben Solo (born 26 January 1997) is an Australian stand-up and sketch comedian. He rose to prominence via social media starting in 2020, becoming known for his use of self-referential and surreal humour. He lives in Los Angeles.

== Career ==
Solo studied film and television in university. He then worked as an editor and producer on the Luke and Lewis comedy podcast until 2021. He rose to prominence via social media videos. As of May 2024, he has 572,000 subscribers on TikTok and his videos have garnered 28 million likes. In 2021, he hosted a podcast called Stick to the Script.

His humour incorporates self-referential and surreal elements, such as a routine in which he draws a graph plotting the audience's reaction to the routine as it unfolds.

In 2024, Solo auditioned for the nineteenth season of America's Got Talent where he performed a comedy routine using a white board and finished his performance by pressing the golden buzzer himself. He received four red buzzers and did not progress to the next round.

=== Tours ===
- 2022: Good Boy
- 2023: Palindrome
- 2024: Please Clap
- 2025: Someone In This Crowd Will Betray Me

=== Filmography ===
- Feedback Loop (2023), an adaptation of Palindrome
- Please Clap (2025), an adaptation of the eponymous tour

== Reception ==
Jo Laidlaw of The List described Solo's comedy as "teenage bedroom", "absurd(ist)", surreal, discombobulating, Jedi mind-controlling, and brilliant, writing, "This show makes no sense, and it doesn't need to. It's a wild ride through Solo's brain."

Jay Richardson of The Scotsman, reviewing Palindrome, described his act as "craftily intricate and exceptionally showy, nakedly, hungrily so. Yet the Australian commits to his nerdily sketchy, cinematically-framed hour with such vein-bulging energy, sprightly imagination and crowd-pumping zeal that you're swept along in its looping, mind-bending journey." He added that the show is also "an effective satire on pretentious comedians' egotistical delusions and their self-inflicted punishment".

Dan McInnes, reviewing for the Australian Arts Review, wrote that "Solo is the kind of guy who seems to persist with paradox past the point that most of us give up", adding that, "along with his bumbling enjoyment of his own material, awkward moments are also part of his charm." Fynn Ryan wrote for Isolated Nation that "Solo's brand of comedy is a chaotic and inclusive event which is at its best when the audience are in on the joke." However, he noted that some audience members "may be put-off by Solo's hyperactive and post-modern" style. Kym Clayton, of The Barefoot Review, described Solo in Palindrome as eccentric, unconventional, and intelligent. She praised his ability to "turn sharp observation and oh-so-funny acidic comment on the seemingly ordinary things we do and the trite things we say in our daily lives".

Solo won the best comedy weekly award at the 2023 Adelaide Fringe and the 2024 Fringe World in Perth.

== Personal life ==
Solo lives in Melbourne, Australia. He has ADHD and is colourblind. Solo is vegan, having given up meat at the age of 3, when he was eating bacon with his family, and his sister told him they were eating a dead pig.
