= Henry Hoke (fictional inventor) =

Henry Hoke (20th century) was a fictitious Australian scientist, engineer, and inventor.

== Early life and education ==
Hoke was the son of Dr Silas Hoke and Beryl Hoke, and lived in the small outback town of Hoke's Bluff.

Silas Hoke operated a pharmacy, and invented a medication called Willing’s Suspension of Disbelief, and Beryl Hoke was an accomplished blacksmith.

== Career ==
Many of Hoke's inventions were lost but are now being rediscovered. He is considered to have been fifty years ahead of his time.

Hoke first worked as a fencer, starting his career as an inventor by developing pre-dug fence post holes.

Hoke established a tool manufacturing company, Hoke's Tool Company.

=== Notable inventions ===
Some of Hoke's more notable inventions are now known to include:

- Packaged half baked ideas
- A hammer which works around corners
- Boxed spark plug sparks
- A clock work motor vehicle
- The wooden magnet
- Bottled spirit level bubbles
- The random excuse generator
- Tartan paint
- Dehydrated water pills

== Recognition ==
Hoke has been immortalised in various media.

Many of his invented tools have been researched and are now documented in the publication, Henry Hoke’s Guide to the Misguided, and in the publication, The Lost Tools of Henry Hoke.

Hoke's work has been featured in exhibitions and festivals, for example by the Australian Network for Art and Technology as part of National Science Week in 2010, and for example in South Australia's 2018 History Festival.

In 2013 Questacon featured an exhibition of Hoke's inventions, The Lost Tools of Henry Hoke.

He was the subject of a twenty-one episode documentary television series by the Australian Broadcasting Corporation first broadcast in 2014 and repeated in 2016. The audio was rebroadcast as part of The Science Show by the ABC in 2018.
