= Elliot Goblet =

Australian comedian

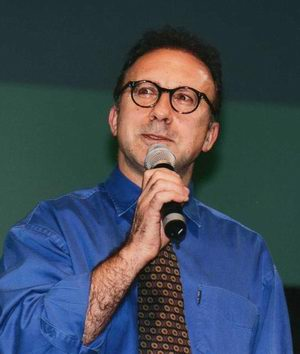
- Jack Levi as Elliot Goblet
- First appearance: 1981
- Last appearance: Present
- Created by: Jack Levi
- Portrayed by: Jack Levi

Elliot Goblet is a comedy character created by the Australian comedian Jack Levi. The character is known for the deadpan delivery of one-line jokes. The style compares with the American comedian Steven Wright but developed independently. At first Goblet appeared with round glasses and a goatee beard, but the beard was later removed.

Jack Elliott Levi was born in Melbourne on 6 September 1950 and he created the character of Elliot Goblet in June 1981 with assistance from Australian comedy teacher Pete Crofts. The Goblet character was launched onto the comedy scene with numerous TV performances on The Daryl Somers Show, Hey Hey It's Saturday, The Midday Show, The Eleventh Hour, The Footy Show, Neighbours and other Australian TV variety and sketch shows.

As Goblet, Levi recorded the ARIA award-nominated CD Internally Berserk, wrote the book Business According To Goblet and has appeared in short films as well as the feature film Fat Pizza. He has also hosted the Qantas comedy audio program on all of their flights worldwide.

Levi has performed as Goblet around Australia as well as in seven other countries, including the United States and England.

Together with Mitchell Faircloth (aka "Slim Whittle"), Levi created the Crimson Goat Cabaret Club and they produced over 30 variety and cabaret shows.

In April 2015 a new comedy album, Goblet's Greatest Bits, was released and a portion of the proceeds from the album are going to two causes, the Father Bob Maguire Foundation and the Les Twentyman Foundation.

These days he is a wedding master of ceremonies and corporate comedian.

== Discography ==
=== Albums ===
List of compilations albums, with selected chart positions
Title	Album details
Internally Berserk	Released: 1999; Format: CD; Label: Streetwise Music Group (SW99017)
Goblet's Greatest Bits	Released: 2015; Format: CD, DD; Label: Sony Music Australia (88875092042)

=== Singles ===
Year	Title
1984	"A Change of Pace"
1989	"Friday on My Mind"

== Awards and nominations ==
=== ARIA Music Awards ===
The ARIA Music Awards are a set of annual ceremonies presented by Australian Recording Industry Association (ARIA), which recognise excellence, innovation, and achievement across all genres of the music of Australia. They commenced in 1987.

Year	Nominee / work	Award	Result	Ref.
2000	Internally Berserk	Best Comedy Release	Nominated	
