= Big Al (comedian) =

Australian comedian

Big Al is a stand-up comedian who lives in Adelaide, South Australia. He starred alongside fellow Adelaide comedian Mark Trenwith in the comedy show Give Us A Hug in the 2006 Adelaide Fringe Festival.

He was one of the finalists in FHM's Search for Australia's Funniest Man.

Big Al hosted a weekly radio program on Fresh 92.7 for several years.

== Live shows ==
- Scott and Big Al's Big Night Out – 2004 Adelaide Fringe Festival
- Give Us a Hug – 2006 Adelaide Fringe Festival
- Best of Adelaide Comedy – 2006 Melbourne International Comedy Festival
- Best of Adelaide Comedy – 2007 Adelaide Fringe Festival
- Life on a Budget – 2008 Adelaide Fringe Festival
- Big Al & Scott John's Big Night In – 2020 Adelaide Fringe Festival
