= Craig Egan =

Australian comedian

Craig Egan is a stand-up comedian who lives in Adelaide, South Australia. He has appeared in numerous shows in the Adelaide Fringe Festival and Melbourne International Comedy Festival and also on Stand Up Australia.

Egan currently runs Adelaide Comedy.

== Live shows ==
- Craig Egan's Summer of Rock Tour (2004 Adelaide Festival Fringe)
- Make Some Noise (2006 Adelaide Fringe Festival)
- Best of Adelaide (2006 Melbourne International Comedy Festival)

== TV appearances ==
- Stand Up Australia
