= Ciaran Lyons =

Australian stand up comedian and presenter

- Born: 13 December 1996 (age 29); Dublin, Ireland
- Occupations: Comedian; Radio host Television presenter
- Years active: 2012 - present

Ciaran Lyons (born 13 December 1996) is an Australian stand up comedian, television, radio presenter and cryptocurrency commentator. He is best known for his work as a presenter on national radio network triple j as well as his television appearances on The Project, Talkin' 'Bout Your Generation and the latest series of SBS Filthy Rich and Homeless.

== Personal life ==
Lyons was born in Dublin, Ireland in 1996 where he lived for seven years before moving with his family to Perth, Australia.

== Career ==
Lyons did his first gig aged 14 years old at the Laugh Resort Comedy Club in Perth, and began performing at major comedy venues around Australia. Whilst underage for the first few years of his career, his parents had to take him to all his shows. In 2012 he appeared in the WA Raw Comedy Finals, before winning "Next Gen Comedian" the following year at the 2013 Perth International Comedy Festival.

At 18 years old, Lyons debut solo show at the Perth Fringe was nominated for "Best Comedy" award. That same year he was selected to be part of the 2015 Melbourne International Comedy Festival "Comedy Zone" Show. He has made appearances at Triple J's Good Az Friday, Splendour in the Grass and ABC Comedy Bites Gala (Hamer Hall, Melbourne).

Lyons was a regular Perth Metro Whip presenter for Network Ten's The Project, covering what was happening in Perth over the weekend.

In 2016 The Sunday Times included Lyons in their Hottest 100 WA People List.

Lyons now resides in Sydney and can be heard regularly presenting on national youth station Triple J. Over the 2018 Summer he was heard filling in for weekday breakfast presenters Ben and Liam, hosting Triple J Breakfast.

Lyons has been heard hosting various shows across Triple J including weekday breakfast, lunch and Drive as well as across the weekends on Breakfast and Afternoons.

He has opened for some of the biggest names in comedy including Ron Funches, Demetri Martin and Theo Von.

In 2019, Lyons was invited to headline a weekend of shows at Malaysia's largest comedy venue, The Joke Factory.

He is currently signed to Mushroom Group and Frontier Touring and recently appeared on Channel Nine's new series of Talkin' Bout Your Generation as part of the Gen Z team.

On 12 May 2020 it was announced that Lyons was one of the five high profile Australians in the new season of the SBS series Filthy Rich and Homeless. Lyons experienced homelessness for ten days and it will be broadcast nationally over three episodes on SBS in June 2020.

He has since moved into the cryptocurrency industry, hosting major conferences around the world, including Blockchain Life in Dubai, Token2049 Singapore, Paris Blockchain Week, and Consensus Hong Kong.

He has interviewed some of the biggest names in the industry including Michael Saylor, Justin Sun, and Adam Back. He currently serves as the global head of multimedia for Cointelegraph. He has also served as a contributor on the topic of cryptocurrency to News.com.au.

== Fundraising ==
During the devastating 2019-20 Australian bushfire season Lyons produced, organised and hosted a Bushfire Relief Comedy Gala at The Astor Theatre in Perth to great success. Featuring high profile names Peter Rowsthorn and Matt Dykinski, the night raised over $10,000 for Australian Red Cross.
