= King Billy Cokebottle =

Australian comedian (1949–2019)

- Born: 23 July 1949; Holland, Netherlands
- Died: 26 September 2019 (aged 70); Perth, Western Australia

Comedy career
- Years active: 1972–2014

Louis Beers (23 July 1949 – 26 September 2019) was an Australian comedian who performed under the stage name King Billy Cokebottle. He attracted controversy at his performances by wearing blackface to impersonate an Aboriginal Australian. Beers was born in Holland and his family migrated to Australia when he was 3 years old, where he grew up in the Perth suburb of Riverton in Western Australia. He began performing as King Billy on Perth radio in the 1970s and moved to Townsville, Queensland in the early 1990s. Changing attitudes towards the use of blackface and towards racism in Australia led Beers to receive less work in his later years. Despite the contents of his performance, Beers denied allegations of racism and claimed to have Aboriginal family members.

In July 2002, the Crown Casino cancelled a scheduled Beers performance after receiving complaints from various Aboriginal and other ethnic community groups. In the same month Aboriginal activist John Kelly-Country lodged a complaint against Beers with the Human Rights and Equal Opportunity Commission. After the Commissioner terminated the complaint in March 2003, Kelly-Country commenced proceedings against Beers in the Federal Magistrates Court in Darwin, claiming that Beers' performance breached Section 18C of the Racial Discrimination Act. Amongst the orders sought by Kelly-Country were a prohibition against Beers making recordings or performing live shows, a public apology, financial penalty and compensation for humiliation. Beers successfully represented himself in the case, which ended in May 2004 with the determination that while his performance was offensive, it was exempted under Section 18D of the Act as an artistic work. The case has subsequently been discussed in relation to the operation of the Act and proposed revisions would remove Section 18C. It was reported that leaders of other Aboriginal interest groups had not taken issue with Beers' performance.

== Live albums ==
- The Lighter Shade of Dark
- Billy Cokebottle 2 - Australia Nil (Bohle Barn, Townsville, Queensland)
- Free and Fully Grunted
- 1993 - Four Play (Bellevue Hotel, Townsville, Queensland)
- 1994 - Gibbit Five! (Townsville Rugby League Club, Townsville, Queensland)
- 1995 - Six Pack (Raffles Hotel, Perth, Western Australia)
- 1996 - Seventh Heaven (Townsville Rugby League Club, Townsville, Queensland)
- 1997 - No. 8 Out the Gate
- 1998 - No. 9 and Still Being Fined (Herbert Hotel, Townsville, Queensland)
- 1999 - The 10 Committments (Reef Gateway Hotel, Cannonvale, Queensland)
- 2000 - Legs Eleven (Dalrymple Hotel, Townsville, Queensland)
- 2001 - The Dirty Dozen (Dalrymple Hotel, Townsville, Queensland)
- 2003 - Black Magic (Dalrymple Hotel, Townsville, Queensland)
- 2005 - One For the Road (Dalrymple Hotel, Townsville, Queensland)
- 2007 - Ward 15

=== Compilations ===
- The King Billy Cokebottle Trifecta
- 1996 - The Best of Tapes One to ~~Sex~~ Six
- The Six Pack Collection
- 2002 - Best of No. 2
- 2002 - Black Label
- 2014 - Blew Label
