= Paul Brasch =

Australian comedian

Paul Brasch is a stand-up comedian from Brisbane, Australia. He has appeared on The Midday Show, Hey Hey It's Saturday, The Comedy Channel's Headliners and Stand Up Australia, and various other television shows, as well as a stint on radio in The Paul Brasch Comedy Hour on Triple M.

He collaborates occasionally with comics Chris Wainhouse and Davo on side projects. One of these projects was Diablo, which was performed at the Adelaide Comedy Festival in 2006. Diablo was a show based on hate and had people walking out mid-performance. Brasch has been quoted as saying that some people are never meant to get some comedy or what would be the point. He completed a trilogy of shows at the 2012, 2013 and 2014 Brisbane Comedy Festivals: Brisbane (2012), Superheroes (2013) and Haunted House (2014). Brasch has since worked almost exclusively on cruise ships around the world as well as live performances in L.A. and Las Vegas. He also completed a Rock n Roll Comedy trilogy, combining comedy with the music of the 1950s, 1960s, 1970s and 1980s. A fourth part was delayed by the COVID-19 pandemic.
