= Derrida Today =

- Discipline: Philosophy
- Language: English
- Edited by: Nicole Anderson

Publication details
- History: 2008–present
- Publisher: Edinburgh University Press (United Kingdom)
- Frequency: Triannual

Standard abbreviations
- ISO 4: Derrida Today

Indexing
- ISSN: 1754-8500 (print); 1754-8519 (web)

Links
- Journal homepage

Derrida Today is a triannual academic journal published by Edinburgh University Press in February, June, and October of each year, devoted to the works of French philosopher Jacques Derrida (1930-2004).

The aim of Derrida Today is to see Derrida's work in its broadest possible context and to argue for its keen and enduring relevance to our present intellectual, cultural and political situations. Its aim is not to conceive of Derrida's work as merely a major development in thinking about textuality, nor as simply belonging to the specific philosophical discussions in the name of which some philosophers have reclaimed it. Derrida Today attempts, therefore, to have the broadest possible reference, from the philosophical and theoretical through the most aesthetically innovative to the most urgently political. The founders of the journal are Nicole Anderson (Macquarie University, Sydney) and Nick Mansfield (Macquarie University, Sydney). The General Editor is Nicole Anderson.

Authors published in Derrida Today have included: Karen Barad, Andrew Benjamin, Geoffrey Bennington, Tom Cohen, Claire Colebrook, Vicki Kirby, Niall Lucy, J. Hillis Miller, Christopher Norris, H. Peter Steeves, Bernard Steigler, Adrian Johnston, among others.

== Conference ==
Attached to, and named after, the journal is the Derrida Today biennial international conference, the executive director is professor Nicole Anderson. The 1st conference was held in Sydney (sponsored by Macquarie University) in 2008. The keynotes were Catherine Malabou, Andrew Benjamin, Martin McQuillan. The 2nd Derrida Today Conference in 2010 was held in London and co-sponsored by Kingston University and Macquarie University (Nicole Anderson). The keynotes at this conference included: Geoffrey Bennington, Peggy Kamuf, Nicholas Royle and Marian Hobson. The 3rd Derrida Today Conference in 2012 was held at the University of California Irvine (with Stephen Barker), and the keynotes included: David Wills, Claire Colebrook and Penny Deutscher. The 4th Derrida Today Conference was held Fordham University, New York (with Sam Haddad), and the keynotes included: Karen Barad, Elizabeth Grosz, Michael Naas, and Martin Hagglund. The 5th Derrida Today Conference was held at Goldsmiths University of London (with Lynn Turner), and the keynotes included: Kelly Oliver, Paul Patton, Julian Wolfreys, and David Wills. The 6th Derrida Today Conference was held at The University of Montreal, Montreal, Canada (with Matthais Fritsch and Stella Gaon), the keynotes included: Tom Cohen, Drucilla Cornell, Alexander Garcia-Düttmann, Ginette Michaud, and Elizabeth Rottenberg.
