= Catherine Malabou =

French philosopher

- Malabou in 2025
- Born: 18 June 1959 (age 67); Sidi Bel Abbès, French Algeria

Education
- Thesis: L'avenir de Hegel ou : de la plasticité temporelle en dialectique (1994)
- Doctoral advisor: Jacques Derrida

Philosophical work
- Era: Contemporary philosophy
- Region: Western philosophy
- School: Continental philosophy Deconstruction (early)
- Institutions: Kingston University; European Graduate School; University of California, Irvine; New York University
- Main interests: Continental philosophy, biology, psychoanalysis, political philosophy, feminist philosophy, philosophy of technology
- Notable ideas: Plasticity

Catherine Malabou (French: [malabu]; born 18 June 1959) is a French philosopher. She is a professor at the Centre for Research in Modern European Philosophy (CRMEP) at Kingston University, at the European Graduate School, and in the department of Comparative Literature at the University of California, Irvine, a position formerly held by Jacques Derrida.

== Education ==
Malabou graduated from the École Normale Supérieure Lettres et Sciences Humaines (Fontenay-Saint-Cloud). Her agrégation and doctorate were obtained, under the supervision of Jacques Derrida, from the École des hautes études en sciences sociales. Her dissertation became the book L'Avenir de Hegel: Plasticité, Temporalité, Dialectique (1996).

== Work ==
Central to Malabou's philosophy is the concept of "plasticity", which she derives in part from the work of Georg Wilhelm Friedrich Hegel, but also from medical science, for example, from work on stem cells and from the concept of neuroplasticity. In 1999, Malabou published Voyager avec Jacques Derrida – La Contre-allée, co-authored with Derrida. Her book, Les nouveaux blessés (2007), concerns the intersection between neuroscience, psychoanalysis, and philosophy, thought through the phenomenon of trauma.

Coinciding with her exploration of neuroscience has been an increasing commitment to political philosophy. This is first evident in her book What Should We Do With Our Brain? and continues in Les nouveaux blessés, as well as in her book on feminism (Changer de différence, le féminin et la question philosophique, Galilée, 2009), and in her forthcoming book about the homeless and social emergency (La grande exclusion, Bayard).

Malabou is co-writing a book with Adrian Johnston on affects in Descartes, Spinoza and neuroscience, and is preparing a new book on the political meaning of life in the light of the most recent biological discoveries (mainly epigenetics). The latter work will discuss Giorgio Agamben's concept of "bare life" and Michel Foucault's notion of biopower, underscoring the lack of scientific biological definitions of these terms and its political meaning.

In May 2022, Edinburgh University Press published the first authorized collection of Malabou's shorter writings, entitled Plasticity: The Promise of Explosion (ed. Tyler M. Williams with an introduction by Ian James).

In February 2026 she received an honorary doctorate from Leiden University.

== Bibliography ==
=== Books ===
- Plasticity: The Promise of Explosion (Edinburgh: Edinburgh University Press, 2022, ed. Tyler M. Williams).
- Au voleur! Anarchisme et philosophie (Paris: P.U.F., 2022)
  - (English translation) Stop Thief!: Anarchism and Philosophy (Cambridge: Polity, 2024, trans. Carolyn Shread)
- Le plaisir effacé: Clitoris et pensée (Paris: Rivages, 2020)
  - (English translation) Pleasure Erased: The Clitoris Unthought (Cambridge: Polity, 2022, trans. Carolyn Shread)
- Avant demain. Épigenèse et rationalité (Paris: P.U.F., 2014)
  - (English translation) Before Tomorrow: Epigenesis and Rationality (Cambridge: Polity Press, 2016, trans. Carolyn Shread) ISBN 978-0-7456-9150-3.
- Self and Emotional Life: Merging Philosophy, Psychoanalysis, and Neuroscience (with Adrian Johnston; New York: Columbia University Press, 2013).
- Sois mon corps, with Judith Butler (Paris: Bayard, 2010).
  - (English translation) You Be My Body For Me, For, Corporeity, Plasticity in Hegel's Phenomenology of Spirit (London: Blackwell, forthcoming).
- La Grande Exclusion, l'urgence sociale, thérapie et symptômes (Paris: Bayard: 2009).
- Changer de différence, le féminin et la question philosophique, (Paris: Galilée 2009).
  - (English translation) Changing Difference, (Cambridge: Polity Press, 2011, trans. Carolyn Shread).
- La Chambre du milieu, de Hegel aux neurosciences, collected, (Paris: Hermann 2009).
- Ontologie de l'accident: Essai sur la plasticité destructrice (Paris: Éditions Léo Scheer, 2009).
  - (English translation) The Ontology of the Accident: An Essay on Destructive Plasticity (Cambridge: Polity Press, 2012).
- Les Nouveaux Blessés: de Freud a la neurologie: penser les traumatismes contemporains (Paris: Bayard, 2007).
  - (English translation) The New Wounded: From Neurosis to Brain Damage (New York: Fordham University Press, 2012).
- La Plasticité au soir de l'écriture (Paris: Éditions Léo Scheer, 2004).
  - (English translation) Plasticity at the Dusk of Writing: Dialectic, Destruction, Deconstruction (New York: Columbia University Press, 2009, trans. Carolyn Shread).
- Que faire de notre cerveau? (Paris: Bayard, 2004).
  - (English translation) What Should We Do With Our Brain? (New York: Fordham University Press, 2009, trans. Sebastian Rand).
- Le Change Heidegger, du fantastique en philosophie (Paris: Éditions Léo Scheer, 2004).
  - (English translation) The Heidegger Change: On the Fantastic in Philosophy (New York: SUNY Press, 2012).
- Plasticité (Paris: Éditions Léo Scheer, 1999).
- Voyager avec Jacques Derrida – La Contre-allée, with Jacques Derrida (Paris: La Quinzaine littéraire-Louis Vuitton, 1999).
  - (English translation) Counterpath: Traveling with Jacques Derrida (Stanford: Stanford University Press, 2004, trans. David Wills).
- L'Avenir de Hegel: Plasticité, Temporalité, Dialectique (Paris: Vrin, 1996).
  - (English translation) The Future of Hegel: Plasticity, Temporality, and Dialectic (New York: Routledge, 2004, trans. Lisabeth During).
- Le temps (Paris: Hatier, 1996).

=== Articles (selection) ===
- "The Brain of History, or, The Mentality of the Anthropocene," South Atlantic Quarterly 116:1 (2017): 39–53.
- Anthropocene, a new history? Transcription of a lecture presented at Moderna Museet in Stockholm on 20 September 2015.
- "Emotional Life in a Neurobiological Age: On Wonder" Transcription of a lecture presented at the School of Criticism and Theory (Cornell Univ.) on 16 July 2013.
- "Post-Trauma: Towards a New Definition?", in Tom Cohen (ed.), Telemorphosis: Theory in the Era of Climate Change, Volume 1 (Ann Arbor: Open Humanities Press, 2012), pp. 226–38.
- "Plasticity and Elasticity in Freud's 'Beyond the Pleasure Principle'," parallax 15:2 (2009): 41–52.
- "A Conversation with Catherine Malabou", Journal for Cultural and Religious Theory 9 (2008): 1–13.
- "The End of Writing? Grammatology and Plasticity," The European Legacy: Toward New Paradigms 12 (2007): 431–441.
- "An Eye at the Edge of Discourse," Communication Theory 17 (2007): 16–25.
- "Another Possibility," Research in Phenomenology 36 (2006): 115–129.
- "The Form of an 'I'," in John D. Caputo & Michael J. Scanlon (eds.), Augustine and Postmodernism: Confessions and Circumfession (Bloomington: Indiana University Press, 2005): 127–137.
- "History and the Process of Mourning in Hegel and Freud," Radical Philosophy 106 (2001): 15–20.
- "Plastic Readings of Hegel," Bulletin of the Hegel Society of Great Britain 41-42 (2000): 132–141.
- "The Future of Hegel: Plasticity, Temporality, Dialectic," Hypatia: A Journal of Feminist Philosophy 15 (2000): 196–220.
- "Who's Afraid of Hegelian Wolves?," in Paul Patton (ed.), Deleuze: A Critical Reader (Oxford: Blackwell, 1996): 114–138.
