= Niall Lucy =

Australian writer

Professor Niall Lucy
- Born: 11 November 1956
- Died: 5 June 2014 (aged 57)
- Spouse: Samantha Lucy-Stevenson
- Children: Dylan, Hannah and Jakeb
- Relatives: Judith Lucy

Academic background
- Education: University of Sydney (PhD); University of Western Australia (BA, MA)

Academic work
- Discipline: Arts
- Sub-discipline: Deconstruction, literary theory and cultural criticism

Niall Lucy (11 November 1956 – 5 June 2014) was an Australian writer and scholar best known for his work in deconstruction.

== Career ==
Niall Lucy served as a professor in the School of Media, Culture & Creative Arts at Curtin University, and a former Head of the School of Arts (1998–2003) at Murdoch University. In 1997, he was a visiting scholar in the School of English, Communication and Philosophy at the University of Wales, Cardiff. He worked mainly in the fields of deconstruction, literary theory and cultural criticism.

His latter work (much of it collaborative) brought a deconstructive approach to contemporary Australian events and figures. Niall Lucy was one of the original grantees for the Australian Research Grant exploring "Why is there no Noongar Wikipedia". There being no direct or near translation of the English-language computer term User, the community decided that contributors would be identified as "Niall", honoring his life's work of sharing knowledge.

== Education ==
Lucy gained a BA and MA (English) from the University of Western Australia, and a PhD (English) from the University of Sydney.

== Works ==
In Postmodern Literary Theory: An Introduction (1997), Lucy identifies postmodernism as a continuation (albeit not by conscious or deliberate means) of romanticism, especially in the form of ideas associated with the Jena romantics in Germany in the late-18th and early-19th centuries. His discussion is influenced by the work of French philosophers Philippe Lacoue-Labarthe and Jean-Luc Nancy. Lucy argues that postmodernism should be distinguished from poststructuralism, and especially from deconstruction as associated with the work of Jacques Derrida.

Lucy's work is notable for its sense of humour, and for taking popular culture no less seriously than philosophy. The increasing tendency in his later work towards a philosophical engagement with contemporary events is strongly informed by Derrida's Specters of Marx and the idea of democracy-to-come, which is the linchpin of Lucy's account of the importance of deconstruction in A Derrida Dictionary (2004).

Much of Lucy's recent work has been collaborative, and directly concerned with contemporary Australian cultural events and figures. His book with Steve Mickler, The War on Democracy: Conservative Opinion in the Australian Press (2006), pits a hard-left Derridean concept of democracy against what the authors argue are the "undemocratic" interests represented in the work of several prominent Australian media commentators (whom they refer to collectively as "Team Australia"), including Miranda Devine, Gerard Henderson, Janet Albrechtsen and Andrew Bolt. The book was shortlisted for the Gleebooks Prize for Critical Writing at the 2008 New South Wales Premier's Literary Awards.

Among other recent works, Lucy's co-edited collection (with Chris Coughran), Vagabond Holes (2009), is a tribute to his idol, David McComb, lead singer and songwriter for Australian rock band The Triffids, which defies the conventions of a rock biography in its deconstruction of the notion of an autonomous self or identity. Contributors include Nick Cave, Mick Harvey, John Kinsella, DBC Pierre, and Lucy's own adopted sister, Judith.

His book, Pomo Oz: Fear and Loathing Downunder (2010), engages with (among other issues) debates surrounding secondary-school English teaching in Australia, while taking a deconstructive slant on the Bill Henson scandal, the Children Overboard Affair and The Chaser's prank motorcade at the 2007 APEC Australia summit in Sydney. A significant section of the book is devoted to a discussion of John Kinsella's poetry in relation to deconstruction, with reference to Kinsella's friendship with Derrida. Ranging across diverse topics, and working in multiple styles, the book offers a further elaboration of Lucy's work on democracy-to-come.

His final book, A Dictionary of Postmodernism, was published posthumously by Wiley-Blackwell in 2015. The book, edited by John Hartley (academic), was completed by Lucy's friends and colleagues Robert Briggs, Claire Colebrook, John Hartley, Tony Thwaites, Darren Tofts, and McKenzie Wark.

== Critical reception ==
Lucy has been lauded internationally for his work in deconstruction. His Debating Derrida is described by Peggy Kamuf as "an excellent guide" and by Juliana De Nooy as "lucid and pedagogical". Writing for The Times Literary Supplement, Anthony Elliot says of A Derrida Dictionary that it "ranges with considerable flair from Hegel to Geri Halliwell, fascism to Francis Fukuyama, the philosophy of consciousness to celebrity". "It [A Derrida Dictionary] is the kind of book whose wit makes one want to read excerpts to colleagues, and it is precisely this lightness of tone that makes Lucy's book so pedagogically useful", a reviewer writes in Choice. Claire Colebrook commends Postmodern Literary Theory: An Introduction as "a critical account of the difference between postmodernism and poststructuralism".

Lucy's work is widely cited across many disciplines and in several languages. Among those who refer to his work are John D. Caputo John Hartley, Peggy Kamuf, Keith Jenkins, and McKenzie Wark.

The critical reception in Australia to his book with Steve Mickler, The War on Democracy, has been divided. Kitty van Vuuren, writing in Media International Australia, says she was "unable to put the book down" and found it to be "lively, sardonic and entertaining". In 'Overland, Georgina Murray claims the book was "crying out to be written". By contrast, one of the figures whose work is critiqued in The War on Democracy, education journalist Luke Slattery, describes the book as "blood sport" and decries Lucy as "a parish priest in the much-diminished postmodern church". Another figure of critique in the book, columnist Christopher Pearson, condemns what he calls the book's "unusually vicious polemic".

== Other writing ==
Lucy wrote liner notes for the re-issue of The Triffids album Calenture (2007) and for the retrospective collection, Crossing Off the Miles, by Australian rock band Chad's Tree.

== Media ==
Lucy wrote freelance music journalism in the 1980s for On the Street (Sydney), 5 O'Clock News (Perth) and other publications. He was a regular music broadcaster on 6UVS-FM (now RTR-FM) in Perth and 2SER-FM in Sydney. He occasionally wrote for The West Australian and On Line Opinion, and hosted the weekly music show The Comfort Zone on 720 ABC Perth.

Lucy was interviewed for the documentary about his idol David McComb, Love in Bright Landscapes, directed by Jonathan Alley.

== Affiliations ==
Lucy served as a member of the consultancy board of Derrida Today and a member of the editorial board of Fibreculture Journal.

He was a member of the Curriculum Council of Western Australia's Literature Reference Panel.

He was the founding co-director of The Centre for Culture and Technology (CCAT) at Curtin University.

== Personal life ==
Lucy lived in Fremantle, Western Australia, with his children Dylan, Hannah and Jakeb. He was married to Samantha Lucy-Stevenson. He was the adoptive brother of professional comedian Judith Lucy.

Lucy was a committed member and supporter of the Fremantle Football Club.

== Death ==
Niall Lucy, a heavy smoker, died at his home in Fremantle in June 2014, aged 57, 11 months after being diagnosed with lung cancer.

There have been many tributes in response to Lucy's death throughout the international scholarly community. Poet John Kinsella wrote the official obituary, 'Vale Free-Flowing Niall', published in The West Australian. The international journal Derrida Today dedicated its 2014 issue "In memoriam" to Niall Lucy, who had previously been on their editorial board. The international, peer-reviewed journal that Lucy founded and co-edited, Ctrl-Z: New Media Philosophy, included the tribute piece "Who will have come to have read this? - In memory of Niall Lucy (1956-2014)", written by his co-editor Dr. Robert Briggs. Briggs' piece appears in the last issue of the journal Lucy edited. Prior to Lucy's death, he had contributed a chapter on 'Politics' to a forthcoming book on Jacques Derrida edited by Claire Colebrook, Jacques Derrida: Key Concepts (Routledge, 2015); Colebrook dedicated the completed book to his memory. The 2015 edition of Vlak Magazine, edited by Prague-scholar Louis Armand, also includes contributions in Lucy's memory by Armand, Kinsella and Swinburne academic Darren Tofts.

Lucy was presented with a posthumous Certificate of Recognition by the School Curriculum and Standards Authority for his contributions across 20 years to the English and Literature course and examination materials in Western Australia.

In December 2014, a concert celebrating Lucy's life was also held with guest Australian musicians, including Martyn P. Casey (Nick Cave and the Bad Seeds, Grinderman); Jill Birt, Alsy MacDonald and Rob McComb (The Triffids); James Baker (The Scientists, Beasts of Bourbon, Le Hoodoo Gurus); and Richard Lane (The Stems); amongst many others.

Niall's adopted sister Judith Lucy dedicated her critically acclaimed television show, Judith Lucy Is All Woman, to her brother's memory. Her 2015 Helpmann Award winning comedy show, Ask No Questions of the Moth, also discusses how she dealt with the impact of her brother's death.

The Chad's Tree song 'The Flood Johanna', which appears on The Blackeyed Susans's Robert Snarski's 2015 solo album, Low Fidelity: Songs by Request Volume 1, is dedicated to Niall Lucy; Niall's wife, Sam; and his sister, Judith.

The 2017 novel Sanctuary, by Australian writer and actor Judy Nunn, is also dedicated to his memory.

At the time of his death, Lucy was Professor of Critical Theory at Curtin University. In 2015, Curtin University announced The Niall Lucy Award, commemorating the anniversary of Niall's death. The inaugural winner of the $5,000 award was Dr. Matthew Chrulew, from The Centre of Culture and Technology (CCAT). Chrulew won the award for his work on philosophical ethology, posthumanism, and French scholar Dominique Lestel.

== Publications ==
- A Dictionary of Postmodernism (Wiley-Blackwell, 2015).
- Setting Up the Tent Embassy: A Report on Perth Media by Thor Kerr and Shapan Cox (Crtl-Z Press, 2013), co-edited with Robert Briggs and Steve Mickler.
- The Ballad of Moondyne Joe (Fremantle Press, 2012), with John Kinsella.
- Pomo Oz: Fear and Loathing Downunder (Fremantle Press, 2010).
- Activist Poetics: Anarchy in the Avon Valley, by John Kinsella (Liverpool University Press (2010), editor.
- Vagabond Holes: David McComb and The Triffids (Fremantle Press, 2009), co-edited with Chris Coughran.
- Beautiful Waste: Poems by David McComb (Fremantle Press, 2009), co-edited with Chris Coughran.
- Plagiarism! (From Work to Détournement), special issue of Angelaki: Journal of the Theoretical Humanities (Routledge, 2009), co-edited with John Kinsella.
- The War on Democracy: Conservative Opinion in the Australian Press (University of Western Australia Press, 2006), with Steve Mickler.
- A Derrida Dictionary (Wiley-Blackwell, 2004).
- Beyond Semiotics: Text, Culture and Technology (Continuum, 2001).
- Postmodern Literary Theory: An Anthology (Wiley-Blackwell, 2000), editor.
- Philosophy and Cultural Studies, special issue of Continuum: Journal of Media and Culture (1998), editor.
- Postmodern Literary Theory: An Introduction (Wiley-Blackwell, 1997).
- Debating Derrida (Melbourne University Press, 1995).

== See also ==
- List of deconstructionists
- Deconstruction
- Jacques Derrida
- Postmodernism
- Poststructuralism
