= Edward Casey =

Edward Casey may refer to:

- Eddie Casey (1894–1966), American football player and coach
- Edward S. Casey (born 1939), American philosopher
- Edward Pearce Casey (1864–1940), American designer and architect

== See also ==
- Ed Casey (1933–2006), Australian politician
- Edgar Cayce (1877–1945), American mystic
