= Simon Morgan Wortham =

British academic

Simon Morgan Wortham is Professor in Humanities at Kingston University, London, and co-director of The London Graduate School. He is a literary critic and theorist, best known as an expert on deconstruction and the writings of Jacques Derrida. Recent work concentrates on rearticulating post-structuralist thought to Marxist and realist traditions in philosophy.

Morgan Wortham completed a BA Hons in English literature in 1988 and an MA in English literature (critical theory) in 1989, both at the University of Sussex. He then completed a DPhil in English Literature at the University of Sussex in 1994.

Selected bibliography:

- Wortham, Simon (2025). Reading Robert Walser: Criticism, creativity, correspondence. UCL Press. ISBN 9781800088269.
- Morgan Wortham, Simon (2013) The poetics of sleep: from Aristotle to Nancy. London, U.K. : Bloomsbury. 192p. ISBN 9781441124760 (In Press)
- Morgan Wortham, Simon (2010) The Derrida Dictionary. London, U.K. : Continuum. 272p. (Continuum Philosophy Dictionaries) ISBN 9781847065261
- Morgan Wortham, Simon (2008) Derrida: writing events. London, U.K. : Continuum. 145p. (Continuum studies in philosophy) ISBN 9781847062475
- Weiner, Allison and Morgan Wortham, Simon, eds. (2007) Encountering Derrida: legacies and futures of deconstruction. London : Continuum. 215p. (Continuum studies in continental philosophy) ISBN 9780826498939
- Morgan Wortham, Simon and Hall, Gary, eds. (2007) Experimenting: essays with Samuel Weber. New York : Fordham University Press. 274p. ISBN 9780823228157
- Morgan Wortham, Simon (2006) Counter-institutions: Jacques Derrida and the question of the university. New York : Fordham University Press. 164p. (Perspectives in continental philosophy) ISSN (print) 1089-3938 ISBN 9780823226665
- Morgan Wortham, Simon (2003) Samuel Weber: acts of reading. Aldershot : Ashgate Publishing Ltd. 147p. ISBN 0754631222
