= H. Peter Steeves =

Howard Peter Steeves is an American academic and author who is Emeritus Professor of Philosophy and Emeritus Director of the Humanities Center at DePaul University. He specializes in phenomenology, ethics, and philosophy of science.

Steeves received his Ph.D. in philosophy from Indiana University Bloomington in 1995. He has authored several books, including Founding Community: A Phenomenological-Ethical Inquiry (Kluwer, 1998); The Things Themselves: Phenomenology and the Return to the Everyday (SUNY Press, 2006); Beautiful, Bright, and Blinding: Phenomenology and the Life of Art (2017); Being and Showtime (Sawbuck Press, 2021); Up From Under the Rulers: The Anarchic Phenomenological Communitarian Manifesto (RPI, 2024); and is the editor of, and contributor to, Animal Others: On Ethics, Ontology, and Animal Life (SUNY Press, 1999) and Political Animal(s): By Nature and Culture (Mosaic, 2021).

He has published more than 140 book chapters and journal articles, and has presented more than 220 public and academic professional lectures. Steeves has also been the recipient of a Fulbright Program Fellowship and an National Endowment for the Humanities grant. He has been a Fellow at Princeton and Stanford, and was a member of an astrobiology research group at NASA's Ames Research Center.

In 2011, the website Rate My Professors announced that based on their research culled from more than 1,500,000 professors in their database, Steeves was one of the “Top 15 Best Professors in the United States.”

His current research focuses primarily on cosmology and astrobiology—on the origin events of both the cosmos and life—and on APC (anarchic phenomenological communitarianism).

== Books authored ==
- Steeves, H. Peter (1998) Founding Community: A Phenomenological-Ethical Inquiry USA: Springer
- Steeves, H. Peter with Regan, Tom (1999) Animal Others: On Ethics, Ontology, and Animal Life USA: State University of New York Press
- Steeves, H. Peter (2006) The Things Themselves: Phenomenology and the Return to the Everyday USA: State University of New York Press
- Steeves, H. Peter (2017) Beautiful, Bright, and Blinding: Phenomenological Aesthetics and the Life of Art USA: State University of New York Press
- Steeves, H. Peter (2020) Being and Showtime USA: Sawbuck Books

== Papers published ==
- Steeves, H. Peter (1996) 'Moral Categoriality and Moral Being' International Philosophical Quarterly 36 (1): 65-83.
- Steeves, H. Peter (1996) 'Constituting the Transcendental Community. Some Phenomenological Implications of Husserl's Social Ontology In Lenore Langsdorf' in Stephen H. Watson & E. Marya Bower (eds.), Phenomenology, Interpretation, and Community, State University of New York Press. pp. 83–100.
- Steeves, H. Peter (2003) 'Humans and Animals at the Divide: The Case of Feral Children' Between the Species 13 (3): 7.
- Steeves, H. Peter (2005) 'Lost Dog' Between the Species 13 (5): 5.
- Steeves, H. Peter (2007) 'The Phenomenology of Bigfoot' Between the Species 13 (7): 9.
- Steeves, H. Peter (2009) 'The Man Who Mistook His Meal for a Hot Dog' Between the Species 13 (9): 5.
- Steeves, H. Peter (2010) 'Something to Come' Derrida Today 3 (2): 269-294.
- Steeves, H. Peter with Anderson, Nicole (2010) 'Introduction: The Meeting of Deconstruction and Science' Derrida Today 3 (2): 175-177.
- Steeves, H. Peter (2013) 'Information, Self-Reference, and the Magical Realism of “Life”' in Scott M. Campbell & Paul W. Bruno (eds.), The Science, Politics, and Ontology of Life-Philosophy, Bloomsbury Academic. pp. 67.
- Steeves, H. Peter (2016) 'Quantum Andy: Andy Kaufman and the postmodern turn in comedy' Angelaki 21 (3): 115-136.
- Steeves, H. Peter with Ford, Russell (2023) 'Reimagining the Future: Comedy and Hope' in Ramona Mosse & Anna Street (eds.), Genre Transgressions: Dialogues on Tragedy and Comedy, Routledge. pp. 147–164.
- Steeves, H. Peter (2024) 'A World of Pain' Oxford Literary Review 46 (2): 229-258.
