= Adrian Johnson =

Adrian Johnson may refer to:

- Adrian Johnson (umpire) (born 1975), umpire in Major League Baseball
- Adrian Johnson (screenwriter) (1883–1964), screenwriter during the silent film era
- Adrian Johnson (Oz), a character on the American drama series Oz

== See also ==
- Adrian Johnston (disambiguation)
