= Judith Lucy Is All Woman =

Television series

Judith Lucy Is All Woman is a six-part Australian television comedy documentary series starring Melbourne comedian Judith Lucy. It first screened on Wednesday 11 February 2015 at 9pm on the ABC. The series follows on from Judith Lucy’s Spiritual Journey.

== Overview ==
Lucy explores women's issues, and the implications for men, in modern Australia.

- Season 1, Episode 4: Anna Bligh, Annabel Crabb, Deborah Lawrie, and Mick Molloy

== "I Am Woman" ==
In the final episode, Lucy recorded a version of Helen Reddy's "I Am Woman" and it was released by ABC Music. This rendition is credited as Judith Lucy featuring Deborah Conway, Ella Hooper, Vika and Linda Bull, Kylie Auldist, Bertie Blackman, Liz Stringer, Lisa Miller, Jen Cloher, Monique Brumby, Angie Hart, Justine Clarke, Rebecca Barnard, Evelyn Morris, Antonia Sellbach & Karla Way. Suzie Ahern coached the choir.
