= Peter Brunette =

American journalist

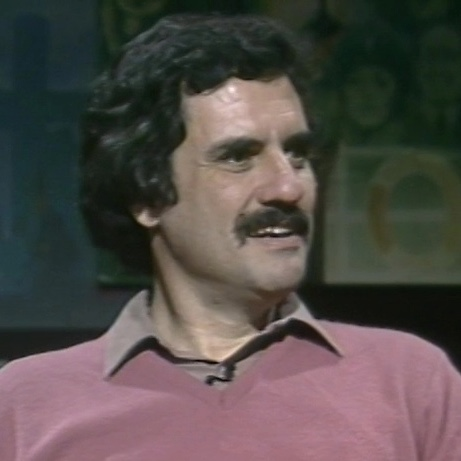
- Brunette on CUNY TV's Cinema Then, Cinema Now (1987)
- Born: September 18, 1943; Richwood, West Virginia
- Died: June 16, 2010 (aged 66); Taormina, Sicily, Italy
- Education: Duquesne University; University of Wisconsin–Madison
- Occupations: Journalist; Film historian

Peter Brunette (September 18, 1943 – June 16, 2010) was a film critic and film historian who taught Film Studies. During his long career he was as an instructor at the University of Maryland and at George Mason University, and finally at Wake Forest University starting in 2004 until his death in 2010. He was the author of several books, including studies of Italian directors Roberto Rossellini and Michelangelo Antonioni, and of Hong Kong director Wong Kar-wai. Brunette’s last book was about Austrian director Michael Haneke, published in February 2010.

== Selected bibliography ==
- Roberto Rossellini (Oxford, 1987)
- (co-author) Screen/Play: Derrida and Film Theory (with David Wills), Princeton, 1989).
- (co-editor) Deconstruction and the Visual Arts (with David Wills, Cambridge, 1994)
- The Films of Michelangelo Antonioni (Cambridge, 1998)
- Wong Kar-wai (Urbana and Chicago, 2005)
- Michael Haneke (Urbana and Chicago, 2010)
