= Gary Hall (academic) =

Philosopher

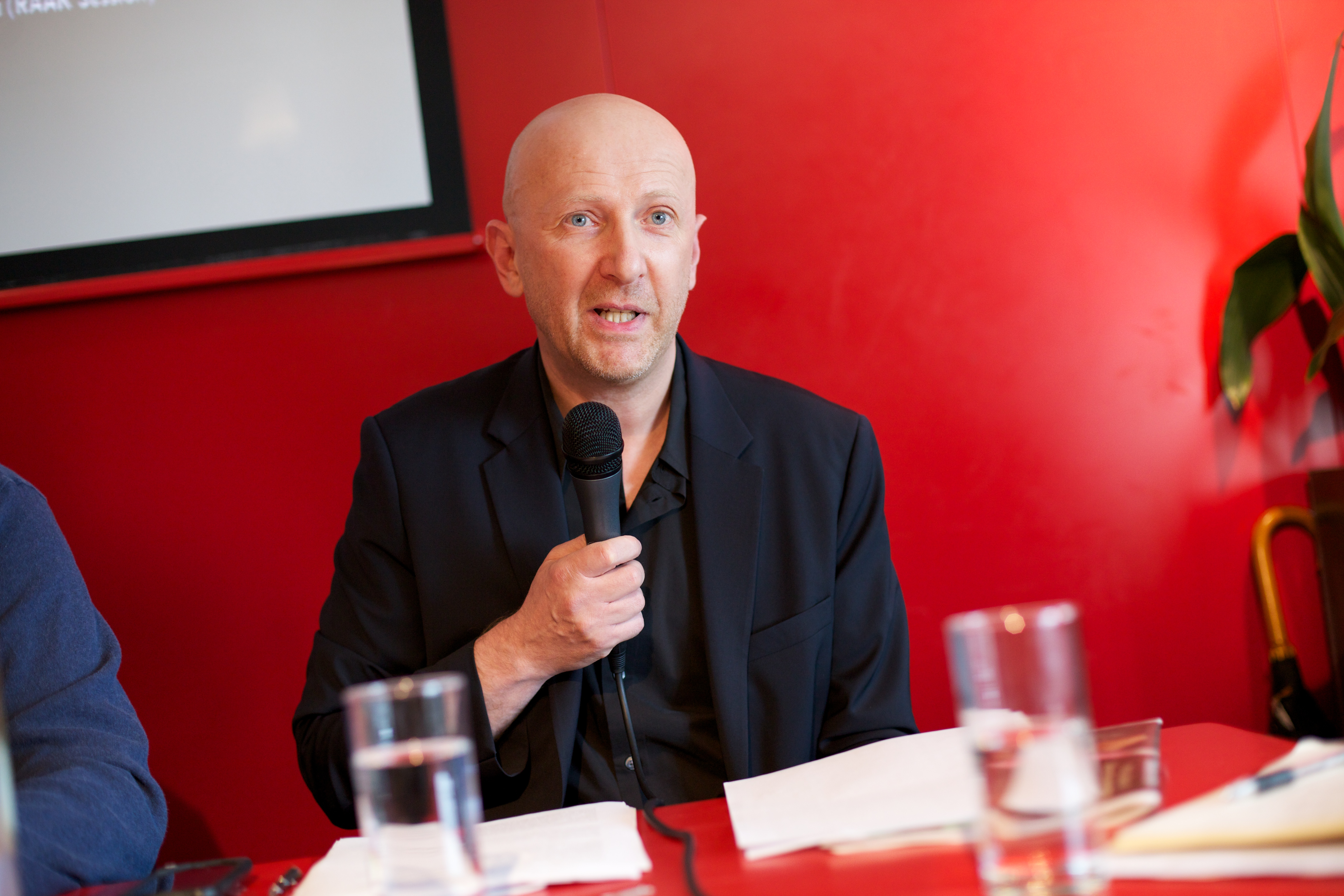
- Hall in May 2011
- Born: 21 March 1962 (age 64)

Academic work
- Discipline: Cultural and media theorist
- Institutions: Coventry University
- Website: www.garyhall.info

Gary Hall (born 21 March 1962) is a British cultural and media theorist and Professor of Media and Performing Arts in the Coventry University Department of Media, UK.

== Career ==
Hall is a cultural and media theorist working on continental philosophy, cultural politics, cultural studies, new media technologies, and the digital humanities. In 2008 he authored Digitize This Book!: The Politics of New Media, or Why We Need Open Access Now. Published by the University of Minnesota Press, it was the first book on open access publishing and archiving written specifically from a critical theory perspective.

Together with Clare Birchall, Joanna Zylinska and Open Humanities Press, Hall created the Jisc-funded project LivBL: Living Books about Life, a sustainable series of electronic open access books about life - with life understood both philosophically and biologically - providing a bridge between the humanities and the sciences.

In 1999, along with Dave Boothroyd, Hall founded the online, open access, peer-reviewed journal of cultural studies and cultural theory, Culture Machine. In 2006, together with Steve Green, he established the first open access archive for cultural and media studies research, CSeARCH (Cultural Studies e-Archive), and in 2006, working with Sigi Jottkandt, David Ottina, and Paul Ashton, he founded Open Humanities Press in response to the perceived crisis in academic publishing.

== Open Humanities Press ==
Open Humanities Press was founded In 2006 by Sigi Jottkandt, David Ottina, and Paul Ashton alongside Gary Hall. OHP is the first open-access publishing ‘house’ explicitly dedicated to critical and cultural theory with the aim to develop a new sustainable business model for the open publication and dissemination of academic research and scholarship in the arts and humanities. In 2009 OHP launched the 'monograph project'. Designed to publish monographs in an open access manner, this project is run in collaboration with the University of Michigan Library’s Scholarly Publishing Office, University of California, Irvine, University of California, Los Angeles Library, and the Public Knowledge Project headed by John Willinsky at Stanford University.

== Published books ==
- Digitize This Book!: The Politics of New Media, or Why We Need Open Access Now (University of Minnesota Press, 2008), the first book on open access publishing and archiving written specifically from a critical theory perspective.
- Experimenting: Essays with Samuel Weber (Fordham University Press, 2007), edited with Simon Morgan Wortham, the first book of its kind on the work of the theorist of technology Samuel Weber.
- New Cultural Studies: Adventures in Theory (Edinburgh University Press, 2006), edited with Clare Birchall, exploring some of the new directions being mapped out across the intersections of cultural studies and cultural theory by a new 'post-Birmingham School' generation of writers. Themes and issues addressed in this volume include the relation of cultural studies to new media, the posthumanities, German media theory, anti-capitalism, ethics, and the transnational, as well as to the philosophy of Agamben, Badiou, Deleuze, Kittler, Žižek and others.
- Culture in Bits (Continuum, 2002), in which Hall argues for a rethinking of attitudes toward cultural theory within media, communication and cultural studies.
