= Nicole Anderson (philosopher) =

Professor at Macquarie University, Australia

Education
- Education: University of Sydney (PhD)

Philosophical work
- Era: 21st-century philosophy
- Region: Western philosophy
- Institutions: Arizona State University, Macquarie University, Warsaw University
- Main interests: cultural theory, continental philosophy

Nicole Anderson is an Australian philosopher who is Professor and Director of The Institute for Humanities Research (IHR) at Arizona State University. She is also Honorary Professor at Macquarie University and Professor Honoris Causa for the International Institute for Hermeneutics at Warsaw University. Anderson is known for her works on Derrida's thought and is the co-founder and chief editor of the journal Derrida Today.

== Books ==
- Derrida: Ethics Under Erasure (2014)
- Cultural Theory in Everyday Practice (2009)

== Articles ==
- With H. Peter Steeves (2010) Introduction: The Meeting of Deconstruction and Science Derrida Today 3 (2): 175–177.
