= Jean-Claude Guédon =

French academic

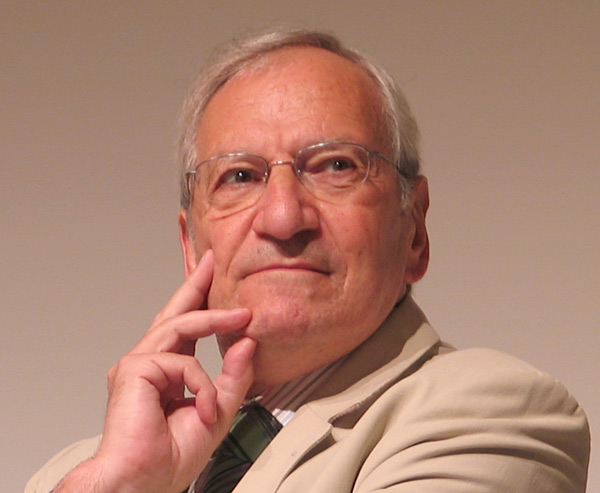
- Jean-Claude Guédon at Writers' and Literary Translators' International Conference (Stockholm, June 30, 2008)
- Born: 1943 (age 82–83); Le Havre, France
- Education: Clarkson University; University of Wisconsin, Madison
- Scientific career
- Fields: History of science

Jean-Claude Guédon (born 1943 in Le Havre, France) is a Quebec-based academic.

== Education ==
In 1960–61, he was an American Field Service exchange student in Kenmore East Senior High School in Tonawanda, New York (US). He went on to study chemistry at Clarkson University in Potsdam, New York and earned a Ph.D. in history of science at the University of Wisconsin, Madison in 1974.

== Academic career ==
He began his career at Glendon College (York University) in Toronto, Ontario in 1970. He has been a professor at the Université de Montréal since 1973, first in the Institut d'histoire et de sociopolitique des sciences and, since 1987, in the Département de littérature comparée. He is a long-time member of the Internet Society serving as co-chair of the program committee in 1996, 1998 and 2000, and member of the same committee in 1997, 1999 and 2002.

== Scholarly activities ==
Between 1998 and 2003, he was chair of the advisory board for CNSLP (Canadian National Site Licence Project, now known as CRKN (Canadian Research Knowledge network). From 2002 until 2006, he was a member of the Open Society Institute's Information Program sub-board. From 2003 to 2007 he was a member of the advisory board of eIFL (Electronic Information for Libraries). In 2006 he was elected (until November 2008) Vice-president of the Canadian Federation for the Humanities and Social Sciences. His portfolio is "dissemination of research".

He has advised numerous governmental bodies, including the Ministère de la Recherche (France) for their e-publication project in the humanities and the social sciences; the Agence de la francophonie for matters pertaining to new technologies; the Quebec Minister of Communication in charge of the information highway; and the Quebec Ministry of education for the integration of the new technologies into the curriculum.

He was also named "Leiter Lecturer" at the National Library of Medicine in 1998. He is the founder of the first Canadian scholarly electronic journal Surfaces (started in 1991) and a Steering Group member of Open Humanities Press, an international open access publishing collective specializing in critical and cultural theory. He is also on the Academic Steering & Advocacy Committee of the Open Library of Humanities. He has won academic prizes such as Prix International Charles Hélou de la francophonie (1996) and the Excellence Prize of the Canadian Society for Digital Humanities/Société canadienne des humanités numériques (formerly known as COSH-COCH) in 2005. In 2018, the Jean-Claude Guédon Prize was established to reward "the best article on the issues of scholarly publications and/or open access."

== Publications ==
- Guédon, Jean Claude (2001), In Oldenburg's Long Shadow : Librarians, Research Scientists, Publishers, and the Control of Scientific Publishing, Association of Research Libraries, ISBN 0-918006-81-3
- Guédon, Jean Claude (2007), Open Access and the divide between “mainstream” and “peripheral” science , in "Como gerir e qualificar revistas científicas", 2008.
- Interview with Guédon (2015). Crystals of Knowledge Production. An Intercontinental Conversation about Open Science and the Humanities, in Nordic Perspectives on Open Science 1.
