= Nick Mansfield =

Australian philosopher

- Born: 1959

Philosophical work
- Era: Contemporary philosophy
- Region: Western philosophy
- School: Continental
- Main interests: subjectivity aesthetics radical sexuality

Nick James Mansfield (born 1959) is an Australian philosopher and Dean of Higher Degree Research at the Macquarie University. He is known for his research on subjectivity and sovereignty. Mansfield is one of the founding general editors of the journal Derrida Today.

== Bibliography ==
- The God who Deconstructs Himself: Sovereignty and Subjectivity Between Freud, Bataille, and Derrida
- Subjectivity: Theories of the Self from Freud to Haraway
- Cultural Studies and Critical Theory
- Masochism: The Art of Power
- Theorizing war: From Hobbes to Badiou
- Subjectivity: a Theoretical Introduction
