= The Mick Molloy Show =

Australian TV program

- Created by: Mick Molloy
- Starring: Mick Molloy; Tony Martin; Bob Franklin; Judith Lucy; Paul Hester; Leigh Paatsch
- Country of origin: Australia
- Original language: English
- No. of seasons: 1
- No. of episodes: 8

Production
- Executive producers: Mick Molloy; Greg Sitch
- Running time: 120 minutes

Original release
- Network: Nine Network
- Release: 10 July – 28 August 1999

The Mick Molloy Show is a television program that appeared on the Nine Network in Australia for just eight weeks during 1999, debuting on 10 July 1999. The host, Mick Molloy, was a widely acclaimed comedian from The Late Show and Martin/Molloy. The program's running time (less commercial breaks) was approximately 1 hour 50 minutes.

The show essentially took a laidback, easygoing chat variety format, with a set comprising a couple of couches, a coffee table and resident band. The regular weekly guest band, featuring acts not normally seen on commercial television, added to the musical interludes. All this was combined with some pre-recorded sketches, movie reviews, a sport segment, regular guests and local comedians to create a relaxed, urban/warehouse vibe. The lead-in shows were Hey Hey It's Saturday and The Pretender.

The premise of the show was that some mates would gather together on a pair of couches on a Saturday night. It was a variety show, with comedy and musical performances.

At the time The Mick Molloy Show was in pre-production, the popular comedy movie Austin Powers: The Spy Who Shagged Me had just been released, featuring the character Mini-me. In the debut episode, Tony Martin brought many gifts for Mick for his first show, including a new sidekick for Mick called Mini-Mick, a vertically challenged replica of Mick, parodying Mini-me. Mini-Mick was played by Arthur Serevetas (often credited as 'Arthur Penn'). Mini-Mick's catchphrase was "Blow it out your arse!" and was generally a more vulgar version of Mick, often yelling obscenities at people. Mini-Mick appeared in all eight episodes of The Mick Molloy Show.

Assisting Molloy in this live-to-air two-hour shambles were his comedy cronies Tony Martin, Judith Lucy, Bob Franklin and Dave O'Neil, bandleader Paul Hester and The Largest Living Things, film critic Leigh Paatsch, Puppetry of the Penis star Simon Morley and Channel Nine stalwart Pete Smith.

Some of the show's guests included Glenn Robbins, Mark Little, Alan Davies, Stephen Curry, Ben Folds Five, Spiderbait, The Fauves, Mach Pelican, Colin Hay and Stephen Cummings. In its short time on air, the program caused considerable controversy. The very first sketch of the show portrayed Molloy appearing to be drunk, and supposedly urinating on the set with his back to camera. The show was widely panned by critics, and generated many complaints.

The show was originally contracted for 20 episodes, but was taken off air after the eighth. In that time, Molloy was reportedly paid over A$1 million.

== Axing ==
The Mick Molloy Show was unconventional compared to many other mainstream live variety shows on Australian television at the time. Many speculate that it was the infamous "pilot" sketch during episode one which caused so much controversy. The show was axed after eight episodes on 1 September 1999. It is believed that the cast and crew were informed of the axing by Nine management during the week following episode eight, although this has not been confirmed. Another setback for the final show was that Tony Martin and Judith Lucy were still in Edinburgh for the Comedy Festival and, although they appeared live via satellite, many viewers believed it would have been appropriate to have them in the studio, given their enormous contribution to the show.

In 2005, Molloy was quoted in an interview with The Sydney Morning Herald in saying: "It must be perceived as a failure but I still look on it as one of the most informative periods," he says. "I'm still very proud of it and, in a perverse way, I enjoyed it. It's good to pick yourself up out of the rubble, dust yourself off and wonder, 'What now?' "

== Sketches & Segments ==
=== The Pilot ===
This one-off viewing of the pilot was a mock-up of a pilot episode which was recorded and replayed on the first episode. This sketch contains the infamous scene of an alcohol-affected Mick urinating on the set, with his back to camera. Many who did not even see the sketch assumed Molloy to actually be drunk whilst live to air, and numerous complaints were raised in the media in the following days.

=== Checking on the Neighbours ===
With a distinct inner-city vibe and armed with a pair of binoculars, Mick was tempted to look "beyond the set" and peer into the windows of his neighbours. At the rear of the set was some large windows which looked out onto the neighbourhood. The end result was pure visual comedy. Some of Mick's neighbours were less than appealing, and most were just freaky.

=== In Search of the Couches ===
This pre-recorded sketch was aired during episode one to set up the story of how the two couches were selected for the show's set. This involved Mick and Simon Morley "testing" various couches (jumping on them, sleeping in them, etc.). The sketch was recorded at "The Couch Potato" in Melbourne, which is no longer trading.

=== How Delightful ===
Bob Franklin introduced a single pre-recorded sketch, with a live introduction around the coffee table covered with a full complement of cups of tea and cucumber sandwiches. As the weeks progressed, the evening supper expanded to include cakes and an array of other finger food, even doilies. Paul Hester became caught up in the elegant atmosphere and began serving the refreshments in an apron, in an effeminate manner. One sketch involved Stephen Curry being gunned down for using sandwich bread when making toast.

=== "Who would you sleep with if you were gay?" ===
A one-off sketch from episode one, it involved Mick posing the above question to various members of the show's cast and crew. Bob Franklin promptly reminded Mick that the word "gay" could also mean bright and cheerful.

The following responses from the cast and crew were:

- Mick: Detective Andy Sipowicz (Dennis Franz) from NYPD Blue.
- Bob Franklin: Geoff Jansz, but only if Kerri-Anne Kennerley was watching.
- Tony Martin: President Bill Clinton to see what all the fuss was about. Also Ricardo Montalbán (Mr. Roarke from Fantasy Island).
- Kram (Spiderbait): Homer Simpson, as he had "a thing about his butt crack".
- Paul Hester: "The Super Woodies" (Todd Woodbridge and Mark Woodford).
- Barry Stockley: Pigsy from Monkey Magic.
- Kevin Garant: Kim Beazley.
- Judith Lucy: Probably just about anything, Pat Benatar or Agnes Moorehead.
- Mini-Mick: Daryl Somers.
- Archie S. (Floor Manager): "I don't know whether I should say it, but I'd reckon I'd go you!"

=== Entertainment News ===
Leigh Paatsch (Paatschy) presented an "entertainment news" segment. One of his exclusives was the screening of the Australian premiere of "Weird Al" Yankovic's "The Saga Begins" in episode two.

== Largest Living Things ==
Resident band Largest Living Things was a local Melbourne band formed in 1995 and disbanded in 2000.

The members were Paul Hester (vocals and drums), Kevin Garant (guitar), and Barry Stockley (bass). The band was positioned to the left of stage. They provided the musical ambience, as well as playing in and out of the commercial breaks.

Outside The Mick Molloy Show, the group released two albums and one EP, all produced by Paul Hester and Barry Stockley.

== Episode guide ==
Produced by Radiant Industries, the show went out live at 9:30 Saturday nights on the Nine Network from GTV 9's Studio 2 in Melbourne, and was broadcast to Sydney and Adelaide. Although the show has never been repeated, Tony Martin has indicated numerous times that he would like The Mick Molloy Show to be released on DVD with a front cover depicting a burning couch (the show's logo) and the quote "a televisual shitheap" taken from one of several negative reviews the show received.

=== Episode 1 ===
Broadcast: 10/07/1999 Run time: 110 minutes

- "The Pilot Episode" - Band Leader Paul Hester remarks how he thought they didn't nail the pilot episode. In response, Mick cuts to a sequence from the pilot where a drunk Molloy starts sobbing on stage and goes searching for new beer after he vomited in the one he was carrying at the time.
- My photo's up the foyer - Mick decides to take a mobile camera out of the studio to walk to reception to see his photo in the foyer. Jokes ensue including remarks about Glenn Ridge's photo making him look like he's on the crapper doing number two's, and the photo Marcus Graham looking like something out of a porn advertisement saying call me, call me now. Upon arriving in the foyer he converses with switchboard staff before panning across at the photos of Eddie McGuire, Daryl Somers, and then himself - standing up near naked in a pair of blue Y Fronts.
- Musical act - Spiderbait
- Guest - Judith Lucy and Molloy talk about their earlier TV performance days, including a sketch on The Late Show involving scenes from The Blue Lagoon where Lucy was wearing a coconut bra, and Molloy was in a loincloth.
- Couches - As part of the promos for the show, there was significant focus on the couches as part of recreating a lounge room feel for the set. To the tune of Save Tonight by Eagle Eye Cherry, Molloy and three of the writing staff show their travels in search of the couches for the set including visits to the Psychologist, antics in Furniture Stores including interrupting the shooting of an advertisement, a couch on the bucking bull at a local saloon, couch crash testing, and interrupting a stage show of Todd McKenney in The Boy from Oz during Rio where Molloy rides onto stage with a wheeled couch being pushed by Brazilian dancers.
- Guest - Judith Lucy talks about piss, and how people ruin perfectly good alcohol by pouring it into coffee or other drinks resulting in a series of advertisements for Frangecillo. This is before cutting to a sketch about the placement of Government health warnings on bottles of alcoholic beverages.
- Guest - Bob Franklin and Molloy discuss turning down offers to advertise and participate in advertisements for the Adult Literacy Board, before Lucy and Roz Hammond appear on stage as part of a faux advertisement for the same board. Then moves to a sketch titled Bob's Scrapbook covering the life and times of Bob Franklin. Flashbacks include a job interview, a discussion with the local investigative team of the police force about not wanting a girl to join in the investigation, and a taxi ride where he is asked by the driver if he has ever engaged in homosexual sex.
- Musical Number - House band
- Guest - Tony Martin talking politics and commenting on John Howard's can-do country. They then cut to footage as a present to Molloy for his first show, of a live show sequence from In Melbourne Tonight. The sequence, ordered destroyed by the Nine Network at the time of its broadcast, which Martin is alleged to be in possession of the only known copy, depicts Bert Newton watching over two persons on stage participating in a challenge to see whom could finish drinking from a yard glass first. As the challenge was being completed, the contestant on the right was unable to hold his liquor after five minutes and subsequently vomited. Segment host Newton took it in his stride, and moves across frame front of the vomiting contestant with perfect timing and simply carried on with the segment. Mick then gets to presenting his second present, a midget to be known as Mini Mick (Played by Arthur Serevetas), enters stage with Victoria Bitter in his hand muttering "[indechiperable]... stuff the lot of ya" before removing a pack of Winfield Blues and Molloy commenting if he would like to join him and Ros for a "two and a halfsome".
- Midget Selection - A sketch showing the selection of Mini Mick, including a number of tasteless midget jokes before the entry of a tuxedo wearing Pete Smith wanting to audition as a midget before leaving unhappy and uttering the lines "blow it out your bot-bot". The sketch continues with interviews of the three candidates performing impressions of Molloy, before re-enacting the strip sequence from The Full Monty where towards the end one of the midgets is mauled by a menacing dog seen at the start of the sequence which scared the candidates.
- Musical act - Spiderbait
- How Delightful
- Interview - Mark Maher (Kram) from Spiderbait
- Who would you sleep with if you were gay - Molloy, Franklin, Martin, Maher and Hester discuss who they would sleep with if they were gay while eating cucumber sandwiches from a previous segment. Molloy comments he would sleep with Andy Sipowicz, Franklin with Jeff Jansz in a threesome with Kerri-Anne Kennerley, Molloy with Bill Clinton just to find out what all the fuss is about, or Ricardo Montalbán because he knows just how to treat you right, and Maher with Homer Simpson because he's always had this fascination with cartoon characters and transferring that into sexuality. Hester, commenting he's a hog during sex and likes to be pleasured from head to toe, would like to be in a Woody Sandwich with Todd and Mark, before making a number of sexually related innuendos involving the game of Tennis. Molloy then continues to pose the question to members of the house band, where the guitar player comments he would seek some big love in Kim Beazley. Mini Mick selects Daryl Somers, before the producer comments he would sleep with Molloy.
- Guest - Lee Paatch on Entertainment, who refuses a cucumber sandwiches on account he does not eat cylindrical fruit or vegetables. He then continues to talk about film and movie news, before conducting a vox pop on why women go for older men in light of the release of the film Entrapment that week.
- Guest - Pendo covering Sport, joined by Maher and Patch.

=== Episode 2 ===
- Broadcast 17 July 1999

=== Episode 3 ===
- Broadcast 24 July 1999

=== Episode 4 ===
- Broadcast 31 July 1999

=== Episode 5 ===
- Broadcast 7/08/1999

=== Episode 6 ===
- Broadcast 14 August 1999

=== Episode 7 ===
- Broadcast 21 August 1999

=== Episode 8 ===
- Broadcast 28 August 1999

== Reception ==
Shane Danielsen in the Australian said, "Molloy treads a fine line: at once intelligent enough to offer sophisticated, satirical humour -- yet blokey enough to conform to Nine's preferred archetype." Robin Oliver in The Sydney Morning Herald's The Guide said "But the new face on the Saturday night block is Mick Molloy, who, like Daryl Somers earlier in the evening, gets two hours to play with - though he will have to be good to last 26 years."
