= Alec McHoul =

British/Australian sociologist

Alexander William McHoul (born 14 June 1952) is a British-Australian sociologist. He is an emeritus professor at Murdoch University in Perth, Australia.

== Early life and education ==
McHoul was born in Wallasey, a town on the Wirral Peninsula, England. In 1973, he graduated from the University of Lancaster, with a Bachelor of Arts (Hons) in Literature and Linguistics and, in 1974, a Master of Arts. In 1975, he moved to Australia. In 1978, he received a PhD from Australian National University, with a thesis titled Telling how texts talk: from readings of Wittgenstein, Schutz, ethnomethodology and the sociology of literature to the analysis of readings.

== Criticism and Culture ==
McHoul's work spans a range of academic fields such as linguistics, cultural theory, continental philosophy and literary theory. Robert Eaglestone, for example, says of McHoul's' Semiotic Investigations: Towards an Effective Semiotics: 'The book is no less ... an attempt to work in at least three fields at once, and McHoul seems at home dealing with analytic philosophy, continental philosophy, semiotics, and linguistics'. Douglas Ezzy says, 'His [McHoul's] theoretical range is wide, drawing on Wittgenstein, Saussure, ethnomethodology [and] phenomenology'..

== Work ==
=== Books ===
- Telling How Texts Talk: Essays on Reading and Ethnomethodology. London: Routledge and Kegan Paul, 1982
- Wittgenstein on Certainty and the Problem of Rule in Social Science. Toronto: Toronto Semiotic Circle, 1986
- (with David Wills) Writing Pynchon: Strategies in Fictional Analysis. London: Macmillan, 1990; Urbana: University of Illinois Press, 1990
- (with Wendy Grace) A Foucault Primer: Discourse, Power and the Subject. Melbourne University Press, 1993, 1995, 1997, 1998; University College London Press, 1995; New York University Press, 1997, 1998; University of Otago Press, 1998
- Semiotic Investigations: Towards an Effective Semiotics. University of Nebraska Press, 1996
- (with Toby Miller) Popular Culture and Everyday Life. London: Sage, 1998, 1996
- (with Susan Hansen and Mark Rapley; contributions from Hayley Miller and Toby Miller) Beyond Help: A Consumer’s Guide to Psychology. Ross–on–Wye: PCCS Books, 2003

=== Edited volumes ===
- (edited with Mark Rapley) How to Analyse Talk in Institutional Settings: A Casebook of Methods. London and New York: Continuum, 2001

=== Translation ===
- (with Pierre Van Osselaer) Jean–Marie Floch, Visual Identities. London and New York: Continuum, 2000. Translation of Identités visuelles. Paris: Presses Universitaires de France, 1995.
