= Adrian Johnston =

Adrian Johnston may refer to:

- Adrian Johnston (musician) (born 1961), British musician and composer
- Adrian Johnston (philosopher), American philosopher
