= Vicki Kirby =

Australian anthropologist (born 1950)

Vicki Kirby (born 1950) is an Australian anthropologist and Professor Emeritus of Sociology and Anthropology at the University of New South Wales in Sydney.

== Life ==
Kirby received her BA (Hon) from the University of Sydney and her PhD from the University of California, Santa Cruz. In addition to numerous visiting professorships and research visits she has taught and researched in many countries, including an appointment as Erasmus Mundus professor at Utrecht University.

She is a founding member of the Digital Semiotics Encyclopedia Advisory Board. She is also a member of the International Editorial Advisory Board of the Borderlands Journal.

== Work ==
Kirby's research explores the opposites: nature / culture, body / mind, body / technology, humanities / natural sciences and their deconstruction. Kirby pursues these oppositions in terms of social and political conflicts and their effects. She sees the separation of mind and body as the basis for a number of political problems, such as climate change and gender-specific oppression. Kirby's research is significantly influenced by the work of Jacques Derrida.

Her work is archived by Brown University as it was considered critical to feminist theory.

=== Judith Butler: Live Theory ===
Kirby's 2006 publication, Judith Butler: Live Theory, introduces the work of feminist theorist Judith Butler. In it, Kirby examines Butler's contributions to gender theory and offers new perspectives on Butler's work, particularly on sexuality, identity, politics, language and power. She also explores Butler's work in relation to other theorists, including Georg Wilhelm Friedrich Hegel, Simone de Beauvoir and Monique Wittig.

== Publications ==
=== Monographs ===
- Quantum Anthropologies: Life at Large. Durham, North Carolina: Duke University Press 2011, ISBN 978-0-8223-9444-0 .
- Vicki Kirby (2006). Judith Butler: Live Theory. Bloomsbury Publishing. doi:10.5040/9781472545688. ISBN 978-0-8264-6292-3. OL 8168652M. Wikidata Q108595853.
- Vicki Kirby (2011) Judith Butler: Pensamiento en Accion, 1st, Edicions Bellaterra, Barcelona.
- Vicki Kirby (1997), Telling Flesh: the substance of the corporeal, New York City, OL 2646304W, Wikidata Q108595904

=== Essays (selection) ===
- Vicki Kirby (1997), Telling Flesh: the substance of the corporeal, New York City, OL 2646304W, Wikidata Q108595904
- Vicki Kirby (22 March 2018). "Originary différance : "A quantum vitalism"". Journal for the Theory of Social Behaviour. 48 (2): 162–166. doi:10.1111/JTSB.12164. ISSN 0021-8308. Wikidata Q108596069.
- Vicki Kirby (2 January 2017). "Autoimmunity: the political state of nature". Parallax. 23 (1): 46–60. doi:10.1080/13534645.2016.1261661. ISSN 1353-4645. Wikidata Q108596081.
- Vicki Kirby (1 January 2015). "Transgression: Normativity's Self-Inversion". differences. 26 (1): 96–116. doi:10.1215/10407391-2880618. ISSN 1040-7391. Wikidata Q108596091.
- Vicki Kirby (2002). "When all that is solid melts into language: Judith Butler and the Question of Matte". International Journal of Sexuality and Gender Studies. 7 (4): 265–280. doi:10.1023/A:1020382712385. ISSN 1566-1768. Wikidata Q108596098.
- Vicki Kirby (March 1989). "Capitalising difference: Feminism and anthropology". Australian Feminist Studies. 4 (9): 1–24. doi:10.1080/08164649.1989.9961631. ISSN 0816-4649. Wikidata Q108596111.
