= David Wills (writer) =

American translator (born 1953)

David Robert Wills (born 1953) is a noted translator of Jacques Derrida, including The Gift of Death, Right of Inspection, Counterpath, and The Animal That Therefore I Am. Currently, Wills is a professor of French at Brown University.

To date much of Wills's own original and published work "has concentrated on literary theory, especially the work of Derrida, film theory, comparative literature" with an emphasis on how and where we think through (and with) technology and politics. As noted, Wills's writing "rethinks not only our nature before all technology but also what we understand to be technology."

Wills began teaching at University at Albany, SUNY in 1998 and moved to Brown University in 2013. He has degrees from the University of Auckland, and received his doctorate from the Université de Paris III-Sorbonne Nouvelle.

== Selected bibliography ==
Translator

- Works by Jacques Derrida:
  - Derrida/Marie-Françoise Plissart, Right of Inspection (Monacelli, 1998).
  - Catherine Malabou/Derrida, Counterpath (Stanford, 2004).
  - The Gift of Death (2nd edition) & Literature in Secret (Chicago, 2008, [1st edition, 1995])
  - The Animal That Therefore I Am (Fordham, 2008)
  - Theory and Practice (Chicago, 2018)

Single author

- Self (De)construct: Writing and the Surrealist Text (James Cook University Press, 1985).
- Prosthesis (Stanford, 1995; Editions Galilée, 1997, 1998 [author's translation]).
- Matchbook: Essays in Deconstruction (Stanford, 2005).
- Dorsality: Thinking Back Through Technology and Politics (Minnesota, 2008)

Co-author

- Screen/Play: Derrida and Film Theory (with Peter Brunette, Princeton, 1989).
- Writing Pynchon: Strategies in Textual Analysis (with Alec McHoul, Illinois, 1990).

Editor/co-editor

- Deconstruction and the Visual Arts (with Peter Brunette, Cambridge, 1994)
- Jean-Luc Godard’s Pierrot le fou (Cambridge, 2000)

Essays and articles

- "Thinking Back: Towards Technology, via Dorsality," Parallax 10, 3 (2004).
- "Techneology or the Discourse of Speed," in Marquard Smith and Joanne Morra (eds.), The Prosthetic Impulse (MIT, 2006).
- "Notes Toward a Requiem or the Music of Memory," Mosaic 39, 3 (2006).
- "Dorsal Chances: An Interview with David Wills," Parallax 13, 4 (2007).
