= Judith Lucy =

Australian comedian

Judith Lucy AM
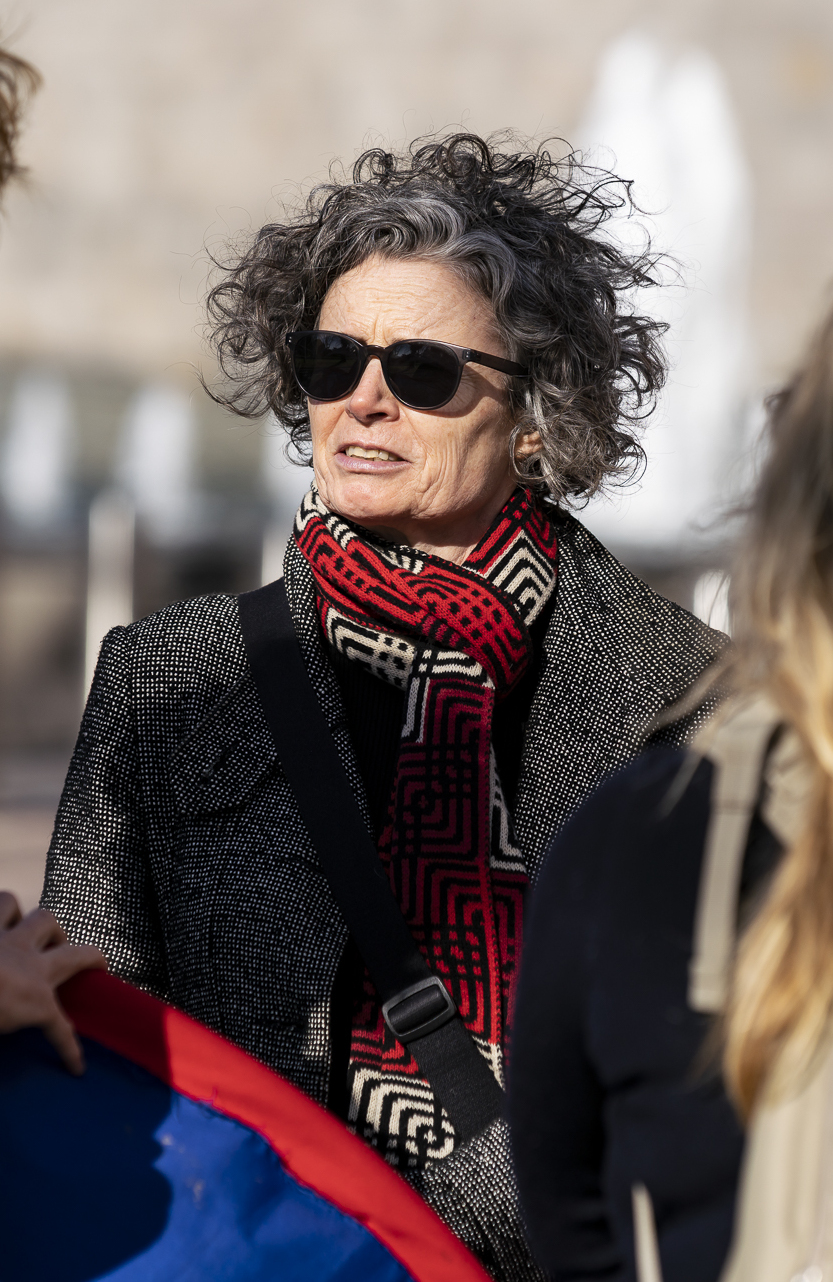
- Lucy in 2022
- Born: Judith Mary Lucy; 25 March 1968 (age 58); Perth, Western Australia, Australia
- Occupations: Comedian; actress; author; television presenter; radio presenter
- Years active: 1982–present
- Television: The Weekly with Charlie Pickering
- Relatives: Niall Lucy (1956–2014) (brother)

Comedy career
- Years active: 1989–2022
- Medium: Stand-up

Judith Mary Lucy AM (born 25 March 1968) is an Australian comedian and actress, known primarily for her stand-up comedy. Lucy joined the team of the ABC's The Weekly with Charlie Pickering in 2019.

== Early life ==
Lucy's adoptive parents emigrated from Ireland to Perth in the early 1950s, and she was born and raised in Perth. She is the sister of Australian writer and scholar Niall Lucy. Lucy attended Curtin University and studied theatre, moving to Melbourne at the age of 20.

At 25, she discovered she was adopted and later made contact with her biological mother. Lucy is quoted as saying they have a good relationship.

== Career ==
=== Live comedy ===
After arriving in Melbourne, Lucy embarked on a career as a stand-up comedian, leading to a series of highly successful one-woman shows, including No Waiter I Ordered the Avocado (1991), King Of The Road (1995), An Impossible Dream (1996), The Show (1998), The Show 2 (1999), Colour Me Judith (2000), I'm Going to Learn How to Fly (2001), I Failed! (2006) (based on her short-lived career on the 2Day FM breakfast show), and Judith Lucy's Not Getting Any Younger (2009).

Her 1998 comedy album King of the Road was nominated for an ARIA Award.

Lucy also co-starred with Denise Scott and Lynda Gibson in the award-winning stage spectaculars Comedy Is Not Pretty (1999) and Comedy Is Still Not Pretty (2003). Lucy toured nationally in 2009 with her ninth one-woman show, Judith Lucy's Not Getting Any Younger. The tour visited Sydney twice for the return season along with Melbourne, Brisbane, Canberra, Newcastle, Wollongong, Adelaide, Perth and regional cities Albury, Warragul and Ballarat. That tour marked 20 years in stand up comedy since she performed her first gig in Melbourne at Le Joke in 1989.

In 2012, Lucy took her new show Nothing Fancy to Perth, Brisbane, Sydney and regional NSW. In 2013, Lucy and Denise Scott teamed up for a new live show The Spiral which made its debut at the Melbourne Comedy Festival before touring nationally.

In 2015, Lucy performed a solo show Ask No Questions of the Moth which won the award for best live comedy at the 2015 Helpmann Awards. The show toured nationally in 2015-2016. The show was inspired by her memories of 2014 which she described as "the worst year of my life", a year which included the death of her brother Niall.

In 2017, Lucy teamed up with Denise Scott again for a new live show entitled Disappointments which commenced touring Australia in March 2017. The show was performed in Melbourne in April 2017 as part of that city's annual International Comedy Festival.

In February 2019, Lucy was appointed one of three Fringe Ambassadors for the Adelaide Fringe, and presented her show Judith Lucy Vs Men there. Lucy retired from stand-up in December 2022.

=== Film and television ===
Lucy has appeared on The Mick Molloy Show, Rove, Saturday Night Rove, Studio 10, The Project and Hughesy, We Have a Problem.

In 1993, Lucy joined the cast of the live ABC TV comedy The Late Show. She has since co-starred with Mick Molloy in two movies, Crackerjack (2002) and Bad Eggs (2003), the latter directed by Tony Martin (both Martin & Molloy were fellow cast-members on The Late Show). Lucy also appeared on the short-lived and controversial The Mick Molloy Show.

In August 2009, Lucy began appearing on Rove, replacing Dave Hughes after he left the show, remaining a regular cast member until the program ended three months later in November 2009. In 2011, she appeared in a series Judith Lucy's Spiritual Journey on ABC Television, directed by her old friend and Late Show colleague Tony Martin.

In 2012, Lucy was the patron of Perth's annual Revelation Film Festival, and had a small role in the film The Sapphires. In July 2013, Lucy teamed up with film critic Jason Di Rosso to serve as temporary hosts for ABC TV's At the Movies.

In 2015, the series Judith Lucy Is All Woman, a look at the role of women in present-day Australian society, aired on ABC Television.

In 2019, Lucy joined the cast of The Weekly with Charlie Pickering in series 5, replacing Kitty Flanagan and cast as a "wellness expert" to look at some of the products offered by the booming wellness industry.

In August 2019, Lucy resumed her role as the "voice of reason" on Rove McManus' new comedy show on Network Ten Saturday Night Rove. The show was cancelled on 31 August 2019.

=== Radio ===
Lucy was a regular on Mick Molloy and Tony Martin's radio show Martin/Molloy (1995–1998), and over the following decade she co-hosted several popular radio programmes, including Triple J's The Ladies Lounge (with Helen Razer) (1997) and the Today Network's Foxy Ladies (with Kaz Cooke) (1998), The Friday Shout (with Peter Rowsthorn) (2003), The Judith Lucy Show (with Peter Helliar) (2004) and The Arvo (with Peter Helliar) (2005).

=== Books ===
In May 2008, Lucy's first book The Lucy Family Alphabet was published. Lucy wrote the book about life with her Irish-born adoptive parents and not knowing she was adopted until age 25. The book has been described as "a riotous take on Lucy's childhood [and] the lunatics who made her who she is today".

In October 2012, her second book (and follow-up to her earlier memoir) Drink, Smoke, Pass Out was published. One reviewer called it both funny and sad but "worth it ... because like a true champion Judith finds a way through her self-absorbed mire. Not in a righteous religious way but in an honest way."

Lucy's third book Turns out, I'm fine was published in 2021 and covers her childhood, the death of her brother Niall Lucy and the pitfalls of menopause.

== Personal life ==
Lucy announced a breast cancer diagnosis in October 2026 and underwent a double mastectomy that same month.

== Filmography ==
Year	Title	Role	Notes
1992–93	The Late Show	Various	21 episodes
1993	Bargearse	Ann Bourke	
1995	Gorgeous	Hermione	Short
2002	Crackerjack	Nancy Brown	
2003	Bad Eggs	Julie Bale	
2003	Kath & Kim	Bettina	1 episode
2005	Da Kath & Kim Code	Santa's Helper	TV Movie
2012	The Sapphires	Merle	
2013	Being Brendo	Brandi Abbott	3 episodes
2015	Judith Lucy All is Woman	Self	6 episodes
2018–21	How to Stay Married	Audrey Price	10 episodes
2019–22	Julia Zemiro's Home Delivery	Self	2 episodes-Guest
2020	Combat Wombat	CeCe	Voice, Animated film
2021	Broad Radio	Self	Podcast Series 1 episode
2021	Only the Shit You Love	Self	6 episodes
2022	One Plus One	Self	1 episode-Guest
2023	Crazy Fun Park	Ms Wiest	7 episodes
2023	Thank God You're Here	Judge (herself)	1 episode

== Discography ==
=== Albums ===
Title	Details
King of the Road	Released: 1998; Label: Grudge (UMD73150); Note: Recorded live in October 1997 at The Continental, Melbourne.
The Lucy Family Alphabet	Released: 2008; Label: Bolinda Audio (BAB 120329)

== Awards and nominations ==
Lucy was appointed a Member of the Order of Australia in the 2023 King's Birthday Honours for "significant service to the performing arts as an entertainer".

=== ARIA Music Awards ===
The ARIA Music Awards are a set of annual ceremonies presented by Australian Recording Industry Association (ARIA), which recognise excellence, innovation, and achievement across all genres of the music of Australia. They commenced in 1987.

Year	Nominee / work	Award	Result	Ref.
1999	King of the Road	Best Comedy Release	Nominated	
