= Philosophical ethology =

Field of multidisciplinary research

Philosophical ethology is a field of multidisciplinary research which gathers natural sciences, social science, human studies and is dedicated to the issue of animal subjectivity. It is about an ontological concept needing a philosophical place rather than a descriptive issue. With precursors in the 19th century, it emerged in its current in the 2010s.

== History ==
Philosophical ethology develops from the thought of continental philosophers, whose researches involve ethology, philosophy and anthropology. Those authors had taken up the challenges coming from biology, phenomenology, critical theory, the Animal Studies and post-human philosophy. These are all disciplines dealing, each in its own way, with non-human animals and the interactions among living beings, in order to propose a new paradigm able to go beyond the limits of the anthropocentrism, which underlay traditional theories.

The mean critics by those authors is the Cartesian heiress of automata: whereas the classical ethology and behaviourism have described how the animal machine would work and which were the mechanisms regulating processes, nevertheless these authors did not challenge the mean idea, that is an animal is not a machine. Hence the need to elaborate a new multidisciplinary approach able to interpret the animal subjectivity ontologically speaking, and the different ontology correlated issues, such as the cultural dimensions, symbolism and materiality in non-human animals and their intra and interspecific relationship.

== Leading figures ==
Three recent issues of magazine Angelaki. Journal of the Theoretical Humanities have explored the thought of three scholars considered among the most influential voices in the field of philosophical ethology by the editors of the magazine, Brett Buchanan, Jeffrey Bussolini and Matthew Chrulew: the three authors are Vinciane Despret, Dominique Lestel and Roberto Marchesini.

=== Vinciane Despret ===
Belgian philosopher and professor at the University of Liège, Vinciane Despret has written many essays and articles about the history of ethology, psychology and human-animal relationship. All along her career, Despert has worked together with few authors from different disciplines (ethology, arts, literature) and with many non-human animals (elephants, mice, rats, monkeys). These encounters allowed her to build a unique research path.

In Despret’s writings, what is peculiar is the methodological approach and her anecdotal and idiosyncratic style: the author chooses to tell stories about animals (or, better, stories of relationship among animals, humans included) rather than to write about animals. Focal point to the authors is asking the right questions to non-human animals. This means that animals are not texts to hermeneutically interpret, not object to quest via scientific experiments, but they are subjects able to provide their own answers to the questions interesting to them.

Within philosophical ethology, Despret has stressed the repetivity of any interspecific dialogue: non-human animals are being transformed by the encounter with the human beings, and, in the same way, human beings result transformed by the dialogue with the non-human. Despret’s stories are full of examples got by researchers, farmers, trainers – along with likewise important autobiographical reports – proving the enrichment coming from the encounter with the non-human animals.

=== Dominique Lestel ===
A French philosopher and ethologist, Lestel is "Maître de conférences" at École Normale Supérieure of Paris and director of a research team about eco-anthropology and ethnology at the Muséum national d’histoire naturelle.

His credit is stressing how a cultural phenomenon is not a human peculiarity. To Lestel, it necessary to see at anthropo-poiesis with an evolutionary and pluralist lens and at culture as a domain no longer apart from nature. It is necessary to become aware that we live in a multi-species society where each species produces their own kind of culture. This proximity of space and time among beings from different species allows the emergence of few sincere friendship and relationship, that have a historical, ethical and political importance, to Lestel.

In 2016, during the International days of study GIS about human-animal held in Bologna, Lestel has rolled out his zoo-futurism, a philosophical artistic trend aiming to "re-animalise" the human being.

=== Roberto Marchesini ===
An Italian philosopher, ethologist and zooanthopologist, Marchesini is director of School of Human-Animal interaction, of Study Centre of post-human philosophy and professor at few Italian universities. For over 20 years, he is leading a multidisciplinary project research about zooanthropology, posts-human philosophy and bioethics to demonstrate that non-human animals have a referent role during the identity structuring (anthropo-poiesis) and the philosophical consequences coming from this kind of relationship.

Main concepts in Marchesini’s thought are zootropism and animal epiphany. With the term zootropism, Marchesini underlines the natural human tendency to turn to non-humans, like a kind of biophilia rooted in our species that see in ethero-specifics some social counterparts able to contribute to anthropo-poiesis processes.

On the other side, with the concept of "animal epiphany", Marchesini points out the characteristic of enunciation and revelation coming from humans-non humans relationship. Animal diversity let human being imagine new existential paths – in the flight of a bird, human being cannot see just the phenomenon per se, but perceive a new dimension of the thinking it is possible to fly – and experiment an hybridational tension leading to identity slidings.

With the essay Philosophical ethology, Marchesini focus on subjectivity. To him, subjectivity is foundation to conscience, not the opposite. Animals get constantly engaged from the external world through new occurrences asking for creativity and initiative not explicable with any automatism. From this point of view, to Marchesini, desire connects animals and the world, desire make them acting in their present.
