= Scott Campbell (philosopher) =

American philosopher

Scott M. Campbell

Philosophical work
- Era: Contemporary philosophy
- Region: Western philosophy
- School: Continental philosophy; Phenomenology
- Institutions: Nazareth University
- Language: English
- Main interests: Martin Heidegger; phenomenology; hermeneutics; philosophy of history
- Notable works: The Early Heidegger’s Philosophy of Life

Scott M. Campbell is an American philosopher and Professor and chair in Philosophy at Nazareth University. His research focuses on phenomenology, Heidegger, hermeneutics, and the philosophy of history.

== Books ==
- The Early Heidegger’s Philosophy of Life: Facticity, Being, and Language (Fordham University Press, 2012).
- Scott M. Campbell and Paul W. Bruno (eds.), The Science, Politics, and Ontology of Life-Philosophy. Bloomsbury, 2013.
