= Edward S. Casey =

American academic (born 1939)

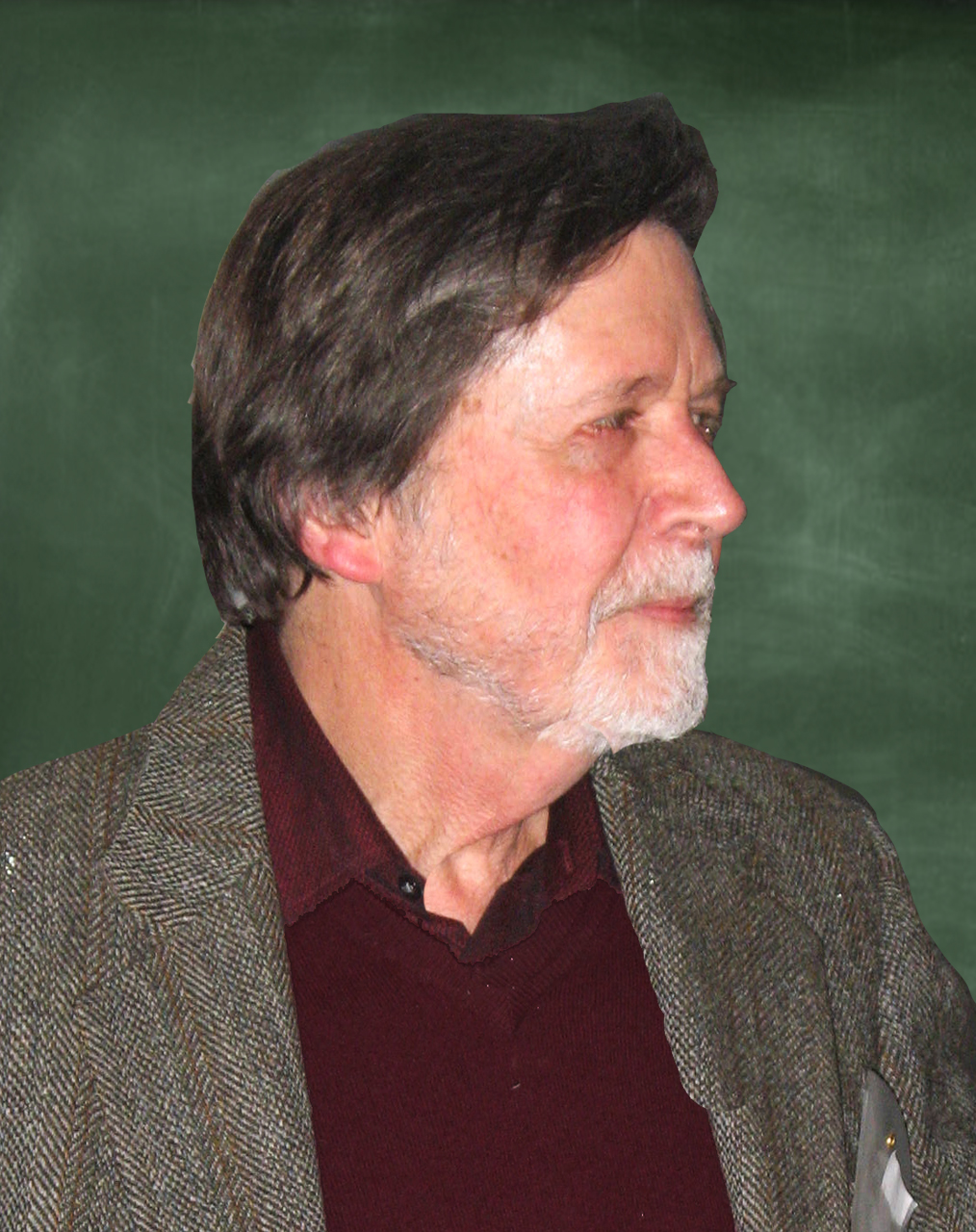
- Casey in 2014
- Born: February 24, 1939 (age 87); Topeka, Kansas, US

Education
- Education: Northwestern University; Yale University

Philosophical work
- Era: Contemporary philosophy
- Region: Western philosophy
- School: Continental philosophy, phenomenology
- Institutions: Stony Brook University
- Doctoral students: Adrian Johnston
- Main interests: Aesthetics, philosophical psychology, psychoanalytic theory, philosophy of mind
- Notable ideas: Phenomenology of imagination, edges, the glance, place vs. space, phenomenology of remembering
- Website: www.escasey.com

Edward S. Casey (born February 24, 1939) is an American philosopher and university professor. He has published several volumes on phenomenology, philosophical psychology, and the philosophy of space and place. His work is widely cited in contemporary continental philosophy. He is currently distinguished professor emeritus of philosophy at Stony Brook University in New York and distinguished visiting faculty at Pacifica Graduate Institute.

== Career ==
Casey received his Ph.D. in philosophy from Northwestern University in 1967, after studying at Yale University (B.A., 1961). Prior to Stony Brook University, he taught at Yale, Pacifica Graduate Institute, and the University of California at Santa Barbara. He has held visiting appointments at Rutgers University, the New School for Social Research, Emory University, Amherst College, and Williams College.

Casey has cited as primary influences Immanuel Kant, the phenomenologists Maurice Merleau-Ponty, Edmund Husserl and Martin Heidegger, as well as his teachers William A. Earle at Northwestern University and Paul Ricoeur, with whom he studied at the Sorbonne over several years on a Fulbright Fellowship.

Casey was president of the American Philosophical Association (Eastern Division) from 2009 to 2010, dean of the Faculty of Arts at Stony Brook University, and chairman of the Department of Philosophy at Stony Brook University. He conducts research in aesthetics, the philosophy of space and time, ethics, perception, psychoanalytic theory, and the philosophy of emotion.

Overall, Casey's philosophical work is broadly descriptive and attempts to bear out the nuances of basic phenomena and peri-phenomena of human experience that have been neglected in earlier philosophical accounts.

== Books ==
- (2023) Plants in Place: A Phenomenology of the Vegetal (with Michael Marder). Columbia University Press.
- (2021) Turning Emotion Inside Out: Affective Life Beyond the Subject. Northwestern University Press.
- (2017) The World on Edge. Indiana University Press.
- (2014) Up Against the Wall: Re-Imagining the U.S.-Mexico Border (with Mary Watkins). University of Texas Press.
- (2007) The World at a Glance. Indiana University Press.
- (2005) Earth-Mapping: Artists Reshaping Landscape. University of Minnesota Press.
- (2002) Representing Place: Landscape Painting and Maps. University of Minnesota Press.
- (1996) The Fate of Place: A Philosophical History. University of California Press.
- (1993) Getting Back into Place: Toward a Renewed Understanding of the Place-World. Indiana University Press.
- (1991) Spirit and Soul: Essays in Philosophical Psychology. Spring Publications.
- (1987) Remembering: A Phenomenological Study. Indiana University Press.
- (1976) Imagining: A Phenomenological Study. Indiana University Press.

== Edited volumes ==
- (2017) Eugene Gendlin, Saying What We Mean: Implicit Precision and the Responsive Order (with Donata Schoeller). Northwestern University Press.
- (2017) Adventures in Phenomenology: Gaston Bachelard (with Eileen Rizo-Patron and Jason M. Wirth). SUNY Press.
- (2015) Philosophical Intimations: Uniform Edition of the Writings of James Hillman, Vol. 8. Spring Publications.
- (1986) The Life of the Transcendental Ego (with Donald Morano). SUNY Press.
- (1974) Explorations in Phenomenology, co-editor with David Carr. Nijhoff.

== Translated books ==
- Mikel Dufrenne, The Notion of the A Priori (Northwestern Univ. Press, 1966; new edition, 2009)
- Mikel Dufrenne, The Phenomenology of Aesthetic Experience (Northwestern Univ. Press, 1973)

== Articles and chapters in print ==
=== On memory ===
- "Imagining and Remembering", Review of Metaphysics (1977)
- "Perceiving and Remembering", Review of Metaphysics (1978)
- "Freud and Piaget on Childhood Memory", Piaget, Philosophy, and the Human Sciences, ed. H.J. Silverman (1980)
- "The Memorability of the Filmic Image", Quarterly Review of Film Studies (1981)
- "Keeping the Past in Mind", Review of Metaphysics (1983)
- "Commemoration and Perdurance in the Analects, Books I and II", Philosophy East and West (1984)
- "Habitual Body and Memory in Merleau-Ponty", Man and World (1984)
- "Memory and Phenomenological Method", Phenomenology in Practice and Theory, ed. W.S. Hamrick (1985)
- "Early on Memory and the Past", in The Life of the Transcendental Ego, eds. E.S. Casey & D.V. Morano (1986)
- "The World of Nostalgia", Man and World (1987)
- "Memory and Reason", Phenomenological Inquiry (1989)
- "Levinas on Memory and the Trace", in The Collegium Phaenomenologicum, eds. J.C. Sallis, G. Moneta, & J. Taminaux (1988)
- "Remembering Resumed: Pursuing Buddhism and Phenomenology in Practice", In the Mirror of Memory: Reflections on Mindfulness and Remembrance in Indian and Tibetan Buddhism, ed. J. Gyatso (1992)
- "Forgetting Remembered", Man and World (1992)
- "On the Phenomenology of Remembering: The Neglected Case of Place Memory", in Natural and Artificial Minds, ed. R. Burton (1993)
- "Memory", in Encyclopedia of Phenomenology, ed. L. Embree et al. (Kluwer, 1997)
- "Remembering the Place of the Other within Oneself", 'translated into German by Antje Kapust, in Der Anspruch des Anderen, eds. B. Waldenfels & I. Därmann (1998)
- "Stompin' on Scott: Reflections on Memory in Relation to Time and the Flesh", Research in Phenomenology (2000)
- "Public Memory in Place and Time", in Public Memory, ed. Kendall Phillips (2004)
- "Remembering John Wild", Continental Philosophy Review (2011)

=== On imagination ===
- "Imagination: Imagining and the Image", Philosophy and Phenomenological Research (1971)
- "Toward a Phenomenology of Imagination", Journal of the British Society for Phenomenology (1974)
- "Comparative Phenomenology of Mental Activity: Memory, Hallucination, and Fantasy Contrasted with Imagination", Research in Phenomenology (1976); reprinted with minor changes in Imagination and its Pathologies, ed. J. Phillips & J. Morley (2003)
- "Imagination and Phenomenological Method", in Husserl: Expositions and Appraisals, eds. F. Elliston & P. McCormick (1977)
- "Sartre on Imagination", in The Philosophy of Jean-Paul Sartre, ed. P.A. Schilpp (1981)
- "L'imagination comme intermédiare", in Vers une esthétique sans entrave, ed. G. Lascault (1975)
- "Imagining, Perceiving, and Thinking", Humanitas (1978)
- "The World of the Imagination: Sum and Substance", Review of Metaphysics (1992)
- "Imagination", 'co-written entry in The Encyclopedia of Phenomenology, ed. L. Embree et al. (1997)
- "Imagination, Fantasy, Hallucination, and Memory", Imagination and its Pathologies, eds. J. Phillips & J. Morley (2003)

=== Psychoanalytic theory ===
- "Freud's Theory of Reality: A Critical Account", Review of Metaphysics (1972)
- "The Image/Sign Relation in Husserl and Freud", Review of Metaphysics (1976); reprinted in Cross-Currents in Phenomenology, eds. R. Bruzina & B. Wilshire (1978)
- "Hegel, Heidegger, Lacan: The Dialectic of Desire" (with J.M. Woody) in Interpreting Lacan, eds. J.H. Smith & W. Kerrigan (1983)
- "The Subdominance of the Pleasure Principle", in Pleasure Beyond the Pleasure Principle, eds. R.A. Glick & S. Bone (1983)
- "The Subdominance of the Pleasure Principle", in Pleasure Beyond the Pleasure Principle, eds. R.A. Glick & S. Bone (1983)
- "Toward a Archetypal Imagination", Spring (1974); Italian translation in L'immaginale (1984)
- "Jung and the Postmodern Condition", in Spring (1988); reprinted in C.G. Jung and the Humanities, eds. K. Barnaby & P. D'Acierno (1990); Italian translation in Anima (1988)
- "Back of 'Back to Beyond' and Creeping Dichotomism", in Archetypal Process, ed. D.R. Griffin (1989)
- "Anima Loci", Sphinx: A Journal for Archetypal Psychology and the Arts (1993)
- "The Unconscious Mind and the Pre-reflective Body", in Merleau-Ponty, Interiority and Exteriority, Psychic Life and the World, eds. D. Olkowski & J. Morley (1999)

=== Philosophy of art ===
- "Meaning in Art", in New Essays in Phenomenology, ed. J.M. Edie (1969)
- "Truth in Art", Man and World (1970)
- "Expression and Communication in Art", Journal of Aesthetics and Art Criticism (1971)
- "Le Poétique", Revue d'Esthétique (1972)
- "L'Esthéthique aux Etats-Unis", Revue d'Esthétique (1972)
- "Art, Imagination, and the A Priori, Analecta Husserliana (1974)
- "Literary Description and Phenomenological Method", Yale French Studies (1981)
- "Imagination and Repetition in Literature: A Reassessment", Yale French Studies (1976)
- "Place, Form, and Identity in Postmodern Architecture and Philosophy", in After the Future, ed. G. Shapiro (1990)
- "Retrieving the Difference between Place and Space", Journal of Philosophy and the Visual Arts (1992)
- "Reality in Representation: Earth and World", Landscape, Painting, and Maps (1993)
- "The Place of the Sublime", in Analecta Husserliana, ed. A.T. Tymieniecka (1997)
- "Art and Cartography", in KartenWissen: Territoriale Räume zwischen Bild und Diagramm, eds. S. Günzel & L. Nowak (2011)
- "Visibilizing the Invisible in Painting", Chiasmi International (2017)

=== Place, time, and history ===
- "Man, Self, and Truth", The Monist (1971)
- "Reflections on Man's Relation to Truth", Philosophy Today (1971)
- "Expression and Manifestation in Sellars and Dufrenne", Language and Human Nature, ed. P. Kurtz (1971)
- "Time in the Soul", Spring (1979)
- "Time Out of Mind", in Dimensions of Thought: Current Explorations in Time, Space, and Knowledge, ed. R.H. Moon & R. Randall (1980)
- "Commemoration in the Eucharist", God: Experience or Origin? eds. A. de Nicolas & E. Moutsopolous (1985)
- "Reflections on Ritual", Spring (1985)
- "Origin(s) in (of) Heidegger/Derrida", Journal of Philosophy (1984)
- "Findlay's Philosophy of Mind", in Studies in the Philosophy of J.N. Findlay, eds. R.S. Cohen et al. (1985)
- "The Place of Space in the Birth of the Clinic", Journal of the Philosophy of Medicine (1986)
- "Derrida's Deconstruction of Heidegger's Views on Temporality: The Language of Space and Time", in Phenomenology of Temporality: Time and Language (1987)
- "Heidegger In and Out of Place", in Heidegger: A Centenary Appraisal (1990)
- "The Element of Voluminousness: Depth and Place Re-Examined", Merleau-Ponty Vivant, ed. M. Dillon (1991)
- "Embracing Lococentrism", Human Studies (1996)
- "Sym-Phenomenologizing", Human Studies (1997)
- "Joseph Margolis on Interpretation", Man and World (1997)
- "How to Get from Space to Place in a Fairly Short Stretch of Time: Phenomenological Prolegomena", in Senses of Place, ed. S. Feld & K. Basso (1997); German translation by T. Staehler in Phänomenologische Forschungen (2003)
- "Cityscape and Landscape: Place and Site in Urban Life", Sphinx (1998)
- "The Ghost of Embodiment: Is the Body a Natural or a Cultural Entity?" in Body and Flesh, ed. D. Welton (1998)
- "Smooth Spaces and Rough-Edged Places: The Hidden History of Place", Review of Metaphysics (1998)
- "Body, Self, and Landscape: A Geophilosophical Inquiry into the Place-World", in Textures of Place: Exploring Humanist Geographies, eds. P. Adams, S. Hoelscher, & K. Till (2001)
- "Between Geography and Philosophy: What Does It Mean to Be in the Place-World?", Annals of the Association of American Geographers (2001)
- "On Habitus and Place: Responding to My Critics", Annals of the Association of American Geographers (2001)
- "Espaces lisses et lieux bruts: L'historie cachée du lieu", Revue de Métaphysique et de Morale (2001)
- "Mapping the Earth Otherwise, in Encounters with Alphonso Lingis, eds. A.E. Hooke & W.W. Fuchs (2003)
- "The Difference an Instant Makes", Philosophy Today (2003)
- "Nature in/as Sublime", Studies in Practical Philosophy (2004)
- "Mapping the Earth in Works of Art", Rethinking Nature: Essays in Environmental Philosophy, eds. Bruce Foltz & Robert Frodeman (2004)
- "Abyssal Absences: Body and Place in Altizer’s Atheology", in Thinking Through the Death of God, eds. L. McCullough & B. Schroeder (2004)
- "Phenomenon and Place: Toward a Renewed Ethics of the Environment" Spring (2006)
- "David Carr on History, Time, and Place", Human Studies (2006)
- "Public Memory in the Making: Ethics and Place in the Wake of 9/11", in Architecture, Ethics, and the Personhood of Place, ed. Gregory (2007)
- "Looking around the Edge of the World: Contending with the Continuist Principle and the Plenarist Passion", Chora (2007)
- "Boundary, Place, and Event in the Spatiality of History", Rethinking History (2007)
- "The Place of the In-Between", PhaenEx: Journal for Existential and Phenomenological Theory and Culture (2008)
- "Going Wireless: Disengaging the Ethical Life", in Mobile Technology and Place, eds. R. Wilken & G. Goggin (2012)
- "Space", in The Routledge Companion to Phenomenology, eds. S. Luft and S. Overgaard (2012)
- "On Speaking Matter, Boundary, and Place: Reflections on John McCumber’s On Philosophy: Notes from a Crisis", Philosophy Today (2014)
- "Place in Landscape Archaeology: A Western Philosophical Prelude", in Handbook of Landscape Archaeology (2016)
- "Implacement and Displacement in the Light of Confucian Thought", International Communication of Chinese Culture (2017)
- "The Complex Identity of Built Place", LA+ Interdisciplinary Journal of Landscape Architecture (2017)
- "Prologue: Brief Ruminations on Borders, Boundaries, and Border Walls", Journal of Chinese Philosophy (2017)
- "From Perishing in the Shadows of Walls to Renewed Life in Vital Borderlands: Walls Beget Walls, Walls Beget "Better" Walls" with Mary Watkins, Journal of Chinese Philosophy (2018)

=== On the glance ===
- "The World at a Glance", in Chiasms, eds. by F. Evans & L. Lawlor (1999)
- "The Time of the Glance: Toward Becoming Otherwise", in Becomings, ed. E. Grosz (2000)
- "Glancing at the Natural Environment", Research in Phenomenology (2000)
- "Taking a Glance at the Place of Soul in the Environment", in Psychology at the Threshold, eds. D.P. Slattery & L. Corbett (2000)
- "Taking a Glance at the Environment: Preliminary Thoughts on a Promising Topic", Eco-Phenomenology: Back to the Earth Itself, eds. C.S. Brown & T. Toadvine (2003)
- "Attending and Glancing", Continental Philosophy Review (2004)
- "The Ethics of the Face to Face Encounter: Schroeder, Levinas, and the Glance", The Pluralist (2006)
- "In the Twinkling of the Eye", in Disturbances in the Field: Essays in Honor of David L. Miller (2006)
- "Fashion at a Glance", in Fashion Statements: On Style, Appearance, and Reality, eds. Ron Scapp & Brian Seitz (2010)
- "Shapiro (On) Seeing: An Encomium", New Nietzsche Studies (2015)

=== On the edge ===
- "Art and Edge", Angelika (2004)
- "Looking around the Edge of the World: Contending with the Continuist Principle and the Plenarist Passion", Chora (2007)
- "Borders and Boundaries: Edging into the Environment", in Merleau-Ponty and Environmental Philosophy: Dwelling on the Landscapes of Thought, eds. S.L. Cataldi & W.S. Hamrick (2007)
- "Keeping Art to its Edge", in Rethinking Facticity, eds. Fr. Raffoul & E.S. Nelson (2008)
- "Taking Bachelard from the Instant to the Edge" Philosophy Today (2008)
- "Limit and Edge, Voice and Place", Radical Philosophy Review (2009)
- "Bataille: Discerning Edges in the Art of Lascaux", in The Obsessions of Georges Bataille: Community and Communication, eds. A.J Mitchell & Jason (2009)
- "Do Landscapes have Edges? A Study in Limenology", in The Place of Landscape: Concepts, Contexts, Studies, ed. J. Malpas (2011)
- "Do Places Have Edges?" in Envisioning Landscapes, Making Worlds: Geography and the Humanities, eds. S. Daniels, D. DeLyster, J.N. Entrikin, & D. Richardson (2011)
- "Strangers at the Edge of Hospitality", in Phenomenologies of the Stranger, eds. Richard Kearney & Kascha Semonovitch (2011)
- "At the Edge(s) of My Body", in A Phenomenology Handbook, ed. Dan Zahavi (2012)
- "At the Edges of my Body", in The Oxford Handbook of Contemporary Phenomenology, ed. Dan Zahavi (2012)
- "Opening Out the Boundaries: Homage to the Journal of Chinese Philosophy", Journal of Chinese Philosophy (2013)
- "Hamlet on the Edge", in Shakespeare and Continental Philosophy, ed. J. Bates (2013)
- "Shaking at the Edge: Ontology and the Event", in Being Shaken: Ontology and the Event, eds. M. Marder & S. Zabala (2014)
- "Going to the Edge", Oxford Literary Review (2014)
- "Finding Architectural Edge in the Wake of Merleau-Ponty", in Merleau-Ponty: Space, Place, and Architecture, eds. P. Locke & R. McCann (2015)
- "Edges of Time, Edges of Memory", in Time, Memory, Institution: Merleau-Ponty’s New Ontology of Self, eds. D. Morris & K. McLaren (2015)
- "Place and Edge", in The Intelligence of Place: Topographies and Poetics, ed. Jeff Malpas (2015)
- "Skin Deep: Bodies Edging into Place", in Carnal Hermeneutics, eds. Richard Kearney & Brian Treanor (2015)
- "Phenomenology at the Edge of its Orbit", Journal of Chinese Philosophy (2015)
- "Edges of Landscape" in The Intelligence of Place, ed. J. Malpas (2016)
- "Being on the Edge: Body, Place, Climate" in Place, Space, and Hermeneutics: Contributions to Hermeneutics, ed. B. Janz (2017)

=== On emotion ===
- "Emotion at the Edge", Eidos. A Journal for Philosophy of Culture (2018)
- "Lawlor Laid Out: Between Space and Emotion", Southern Journal of Philosophy (2018)
- "The World on Edge: Reply to Birmingham/Lawlor", Research in Phenomenology (2022)
- "Heart and Beyond: Following Emotion Farther Out", Journal of Chinese Philosophy (2023)

=== Other ===
- "Presence and Absence: Scope and Limits", Review of Metaphysics (1982)
- "Sym-Phenomenologizing: Talking Shop", Human Studies (1997)
- "Finding (Your Own) Philosophical Voice", Proceedings and Addresses of the American Philosophical Association (2010)
- "Random Reflections of a Founding Witness", The Journal of Speculative Philosophy (2012)
- "A Life in Philosophy in Several Stages", Proceedings and Addresses of the American Philosophical Association (2016)
- "The Gift of Voice", Dewey Studies (2023)
