= Culture Machine =

- Discipline: Cultural studies
- Language: English

Publication details
- History: 1999-present
- Publisher: Open Humanities Press
- Frequency: Annually
- Open access: Yes

Standard abbreviations
- ISO 4: Cult. Mach.

Indexing
- ISSN: 1465-4121
- LCCN: 2008204052
- OCLC no.: 43808209

Links
- Journal homepage; Online access; Online archive

Culture Machine is a peer-reviewed open access academic journal of culture and theory that was established in 1999. It is published by Open Humanities Press.
