= Open Humanities Press =

Open access publishing initiative

- Founded: 2006
- Founder: Paul Ashton, Gary Hall, Sigi Jöttkandt and David Ottina
- Country of origin: United Kingdom
- Headquarters location: London
- Publication types: Books, Journals
- Nonfiction topics: Humanities
- Official website: openhumanitiespress.org

Open Humanities Press is an international open access publishing initiative in the humanities, specializing in critical and cultural theory. OHP's editorial board includes scholars like Alain Badiou, Jonathan Culler, Stephen Greenblatt, Jean-Claude Guédon, Graham Harman, J. Hillis Miller, Antonio Negri, Peter Suber and Gayatri Spivak, among others.

From 2010-2015, Open Humanities Press collaborated with the University of Michigan Library's MPublishing branch to fund the production of monographs. Open Humanities Press is currently collaborating in a similar way with the University of Illinois Urbana-Champaign's Main Library.

== History ==
The Open Humanities Press (OHP) is a scholar-led publishing initiative founded by Paul Ashton (Australia), Gary Hall (UK), Sigi Jöttkandt (Australia) and David Ottina (US). Its aim is to raise awareness of open access publishing in the humanities and to provide promotional and technical support to open access journals that have been invited by OHP's editorial oversight group to join the collective.

OHP launched in May 2008 with seven open access journals and was named a "beacon of hope" by the Public Library of Science. In August, 2009 OHP announced it will begin publishing open access book series edited by senior members of OHP's board.

== Works ==
=== Books ===
The monograph series are:

- New Metaphysics edited by Graham Harman and Bruno Latour
- Critical Climate Change edited by Claire Colebrook and Tom Cohen
- CCC2 Irreversibility edited by Tom Cohen and Claire Colebrook
- Fibreculture Books edited by Andrew Murphie
- Liquid Books edited by Gary Hall and Clare Birchall
- Immediations edited by the SenseLab
- Technographies edited by Steven Connor, David Trotter and James Purdon
- MEDIA: ART: WRITE: NOW edited by Joanna Zylinska

=== Journals ===
Open Humanities Press also hosts several open access journals, including the following:

- Cosmos and History
- Culture Machine
- International Journal of Žižek Studies
- Vectors: Journal of Culture and Technology in a Dynamic Vernacular

== See also ==
- Open Book Publishers
- Punctum Books
