= Parallax (journal) =

- Discipline: Cultural studies, critical theory, philosophy
- Language: English
- Edited by: Elspeth Mitchell, Dominic O'Key, Rebecca Starr, Ruth Daly, Agnieszka Jasnowska (reviews editor)

Publication details
- History: 1995–present
- Publisher: Routledge
- Frequency: Quarterly
- Impact factor: 0.349 (2016)

Standard abbreviations
- ISO 4: Parallax

Indexing
- ISSN: 1353-4645 (print); 1460-700X (web)
- OCLC no.: 34934848

Links
- Journal homepage; Online access; Online archive

Parallax is a quarterly peer-reviewed academic journal publishing work in cultural studies, critical theory and philosophy. Each issue has a theme and issues are regularly compiled by guest-editors. The journal was established in 1995 by Adrian Rifkin, Marq Smith and Joanne Morra, and is now published by Routledge. The editors are Elspeth Mitchell, Dominic O'Key, Rebecca Starr, and Ruth Daly (University of Leeds). The reviews editor is Agnieszka Jasnowska.

== Abstracting and indexing ==
The journal is abstracted and indexed in

- Arts & Humanities Citation Index
- Current Contents/Social & Behavioural Sciences
- Dietrich's Index Philosophicus
- International Bibliography of the Social Sciences
- MLA International Bibliography
- Social Sciences Citation Index
- Scopus
- Sociological Abstracts
