= Claire Colebrook =

Australian cultural theorist

- Born: Claire Mary Colebrook; 25 October 1965 (age 60)
- Education: University of Edinburgh
- Known for: Cultural theorist

Claire Colebrook (or Claire Mary Colebrook) (born 25 October 1965), is an Australian cultural theorist, currently appointed Cecile Parrish Memorial Chair of English Literature, Monash University and was formerly the Edwin Erle Sparks Professor of English at Pennsylvania State University. She has published numerous works on Gilles Deleuze, visual art, poetry, queer theory, film studies, contemporary literature, theory, cultural studies and visual culture. She is the editor (with Tom Cohen) of the Critical Climate Change Book Series at Open Humanities Press and (with Jami Weinstein and Myra Hird) the Critical Climate Change book series at Columbia University Press.

== Education ==
Colebrook hold a Bachelor of Arts from the University of Melbourne (1987), a Bachelor of Letters at Australian National University (1989) and a Doctor of Philosophy from the University of Edinburgh (1993).

== Publications ==
Books

- Who Would You Kill to Save the World? (2023)
- Death of the PostHuman: Essays on Extinction, Volume 1 (2014)
- Sex After Life: Essays on Extinction, Volume 2 (2014)
- William Blake, Deleuzian Aesthetics, and the Digital (2011)
- Deleuze and the Meaning of Life (2010)
- Milton, Evil and Literary History (2008)
- Irony (2004)
- Gilles Deleuze (2002)
- Understanding Deleuze (2002)
- Irony in the Work of Philosophy (2003)
- Ethics and Representation: From Kant to Postructuralism (1999)
- New Literary Histories: New Historicism and Contemporary Criticism (1997)
- Deleuze: A Guide for the Perplexed (1997)

Co-authored

- Twilight of the Anthropocene Idols with Tom Cohen and J. Hillis Miller (2016)
- Agamben with Jason Maxwell (2016)
- Theory and the Disappearing Future with Tom Cohen and J. Hillis Miller (2011)

Co-edited

- Posthumous Life: Theorizing Beyond the Posthuman with Jami Weinstein (2017)
- Deleuze and Gender with Jami Weinstein (2009)
- Deleuze and Law with Rosi Braidotti and Patrick Hanafin (2009)
- Deleuze and History with Jeff Bell (2008)
- Deleuze and Feminist Theory with Ian Buchanan (2000)

== Grants and awards ==
- British Academy Overseas Conference Award (2004)
- British Academy/Australian Academy Joint Award (with Dr David Bennett) (2006)
- Carnegie Trust Fund (2006)
- British Academy Small Grant (2006)
- Huntington Library Fellowship (2007)
- Arts and Humanities Research Council Leave Scheme (2007)
- Goldsmiths College (2008)
- Archive and Knowledge Transfer (2008)
- Distinguished Visiting Professor, Friedrich Schlegel Graduate School, Free University, Berlin (2010)
- Hugh J. Silverman Book Prize in Philosophy and Literature (2023).
