= Tom Cohen =

American media and cultural theorist

- Born: Tom Dana Cohen; August 13, 1953 (age 72)
- Education: University of Chicago (MA); Yale University (PhD)
- Occupation: Cultural theorist

Tom Dana Cohen (born August 13, 1953) is an American media and cultural theorist, currently a professor at the University at Albany, State University of New York. He has published books on film studies, comparative literature, theory, cultural studies, Alfred Hitchcock, and Paul de Man. Cohen has also published broadly on American authors and ideology, including Edgar Allan Poe, Walt Whitman, Mikhail Bakhtin, William Faulkner and pragmatism, as well as on Alfred Hitchcock, Greek philosophy and continental philosophy.

He is the editor (with Claire Colebrook) of the Critical Climate Change Book Series at Open Humanities Press and has lectured and taught internationally, including in China and Fulbright sponsored work in Thailand. He has been awarded a Distinguished Visiting Professorship by Shanghai Municipality in Shanghai.

== Biography ==
Cohen's education consists of a M.A. from the University of Chicago in Comparative Literature and a Ph.D. from Yale University in Comparative Literature. Thus Cohen’s work began in literary theory and cultural politics but he has then explored as a philosopher areas of critical theory, cinema studies, digital media and climate change.

== Selected bibliography ==
=== Books ===
- Cohen, Tom (1994). Anti-mimesis from Plato to Hitchcock. Cambridge New York, NY, USA: Cambridge University Press. ISBN 9780521465847.

Reviewed in: Szalay, Michael (1995). "Book review: Anti-mimesis from Plato to Hitchcock". MLN. 110 (4): 983–985. doi:10.1111/edth.12034.

- Cohen, Tom (1998). Ideology and inscription: "cultural studies" after Benjamin, de Man, and Bakhtin. Cambridge, UK New York: Cambridge University Press. ISBN 9780521599672.
- Cohen, Tom (2001). Jacques Derrida and the humanities a critical reader. Cambridge, U.K. New York: Cambridge University Press. ISBN 9780521625654.
- Cohen, Tom; Miller, J. Hillis; Cohen, Barbara; Ardrzej, Warminski (2001). Material events: Paul de Man and the afterlife of theory. Minneapolis: University of Minnesota Press. ISBN 9780816636143.
- Cohen, Tom (2005). Hitchcock's cryptonymies: volume 1 secret agents. Minneapolis: University of Minnesota Press. ISBN 9780816642069.
- Cohen, Tom (2005). Hitchcock's cryptonymies: volume 1 war machines. Minneapolis: University of Minnesota Press. ISBN 9780816641710.
- Cohen, Tom; Colebrook, Claire; Miller, J. Hillis (2012). Theory and the disappearing future: on De Man, on Benjamin. Milton Park, Abingdon, Oxon New York: Routledge. ISBN 9780415604536.
- Cohen, Tom (2012). Telemorphosis: theory in the era of climate change. Vol. 1. Ann Arbor: Open Humanities Press. ISBN 9781607852377.
