= Adrian Johnston (philosopher) =

American philosopher

- Born: 1974 (age 51–52); Crewe, England

Education
- Education: Stony Brook University
- Thesis: Time Driven: Metapsychology and the Splitting of the Drive (2001)
- Doctoral advisors: Edward S. Casey, Slavoj Žižek

Philosophical work
- Era: Contemporary philosophy
- Region: Western philosophy
- School: Continental philosophy Freudo-Marxism; Lacanianism; Speculative realism
- Notable ideas: Transcendental materialism

Adrian Johnston (born 1974) is an American philosopher. He is Distinguished Professor in the Department of Philosophy at the University of New Mexico at Albuquerque and a faculty member at the Emory Psychoanalytic Institute in Atlanta.

== Philosophical work ==
Influenced by Slavoj Žižek and his readings of German idealism, Johnston's work is guided by what he calls “transcendental materialism”: an ontology that is materialist while nevertheless refusing to reduce away the gap that is human subjectivity. Johnston argues for retooling Freud and Lacan after the success of the natural sciences in recent decades, while also arguing that Freud and Lacan presaged many of these successes. Johnston is critical of the thinkers of immanence whom he believes can only give us subjectless substance.

== Bibliography ==
Adrian Johnston has published and co-edited a number of books, listed here. He is also a co-editor of the book series Diaeresis at Northwestern University Press.

- Time Driven: Metapsychology and the Splitting of the Drive (Northwestern University Press, 2005)
- Žižek’s Ontology: A Transcendental Materialist Theory of Subjectivity (Northwestern University Press, 2008)
- Badiou, Žižek, and Political Transformations: The Cadence of Change (Northwestern University Press, 2009)
- Prolegomena to Any Future Materialism, Volume One: The Outcome of Contemporary French Philosophy (Northwestern University Press, 2013)
- Self and Emotional Life: Philosophy, Psychoanalysis, and Neuroscience (Columbia University Press, 2013, with Catherine Malabou)
- Adventures in Transcendental Materialism: Dialogues with Contemporary Thinkers (Edinburgh University Press, 2014, with Todd McGowan and Slavoj Žižek)
- Irrepressible Truth: On Lacan’s ‘The Freudian Thing’ (Palgrave Macmillan, 2017)
- A New German Idealism: Hegel, Žižek, and Dialectical Materialism (Columbia University Press, 2018)
- Prolegomena to Any Future Materialism, Volume Two: A Weak Nature Alone (Northwestern University Press, 2019)
- Objective Fictions: Philosophy, Psychoanalysis, Marxism (Ed., Edinburgh University Press, 2022, with Boštjan Nedoh and Alenka Zupančič)
- Infinite Greed: The Inhuman Selfishness of Capital (Insurrections: Critical Studies in Religion, Politics, and Culture) (Columbia University Press, 2024)
- Prolegomena to Any Future Materialism, Volume Three: Substance Also as Subject (forthcoming)
- God is Undead: Psychoanalysis Between Agnosticism and Atheism (forthcoming, with Lorenzo Chiesa)
