= The Chaser APEC pranks =

Pranks performed by the Australian satire group The Chaser

The Chaser APEC pranks were a series of comic stunts coordinated and performed by the Australian satire group The Chaser for the television series The Chaser's War on Everything. Pranks were done at the Asia-Pacific Economic Cooperation (APEC) Leaders Summit (2–9 September 2007) in Sydney. The most prominent prank was the breach of an APEC restricted zone in the heart of the Sydney central business district on 6 September. Julian Morrow directed a fake Canadian motorcade, which was allowed through the restricted zone by police and not detected until Chas Licciardello alighted, dressed as Osama bin Laden.

Although pranks that involved public locations, figures, and organisations were always a feature of the series, the APEC pranks yielded unprecedented local and international publicity, both positive and negative. Some team members faced charges for breaching the APEC zone, but these were dropped because police had allowed their entry into the restricted zone. Other less controversial and less publicised stunts were also shown on The Chaser's War on Everything, with ratings peaking at almost three million Australian viewers for the APEC wrap-up episode.

== Background ==
=== APEC ===
APEC Australia 2007 comprised a series of political meetings between representatives of the 21 member governments of the Asia-Pacific Economic Cooperation. This culminated in a week-long summit meeting: Leaders Week, 2 to 9 September, when heads of the member governments gathered in Sydney. The significance of the APEC summit called for stringent and expensive security arrangements. The Protective Security Coordination Centre, of the National Security and Criminal Justice Group from the Australian Attorney-General's Department, oversaw security planning through the APEC 2007 Security Branch, formed expressly for the APEC meetings. To secure and monitor the summit, the New South Wales Police Force instituted the APEC Police Security Command. Many public roads in Sydney were closed, as leaders, officials, and personnel travelled in motorcades around the city centre. Figures released by the state government at a Senate committee hearing show that security measures at APEC cost A$170 million.

=== The Chaser ===
The Chaser group's founding members were Charles Firth, Dominic Knight, Craig Reucassel, and Julian Morrow. In 1999 they started The Chaser, a fortnightly satirical newspaper. Chas Licciardello, Andrew Hansen, and Chris Taylor later joined the group; and in 2006, after various ventures in radio, stage, and television, this line-up created The Chaser's War on Everything, its most successful program, which screened on the Australian Broadcasting Corporation (ABC) station ABC1. By its second season in 2007, the show had forged a reputation for ambush-style stunts and deliberate controversy.

The group had been warned about the dangers of irresponsible behaviour during the Sydney lockdown for the APEC summit. According to New South Wales Police Minister David Campbell, the police understood that "parody and satire are entertaining and fun", but The Chaser must understand the "seriousness of this matter [APEC] and take caution". A later police statement reiterated that producers of The Chaser's War on Everything had been warned about the "ramifications of stunts during APEC".

"	We want to get a working majority arrested and we want to get Chas (Licciardello) shot. At this stage I think we're on target.	"
—Julian Morrow, speaking before the stunt

The Chaser was unfazed by police warnings. Before the summit, Julian Morrow commented on radio that "the eyes of the world and the eyes of Al-Qaeda are on us". Morrow hinted that their challenge was to perform a stunt that would "make Osama bin Laden feel a little incompetent".

== Breach of APEC restricted zone ==
On 6 September 2007, eight members of the team (including five runners dressed as bodyguards) and three hired chauffeurs manned a fake Canadian motorcade consisting of two motorcycles, two black four-wheel drive vehicles, and a black sedan. The group—including Chas Licciardello dressed as Osama bin Laden, and Julian Morrow—drove the motorcade through the Sydney central business district and breached the APEC security zone. The premise of the stunt was that bin Laden should have been invited to the summit as a world leader, to discuss the war on terror, with another motive being to test the event's security. The stunt was approved by ABC lawyers under the assumption that the motorcade would be stopped at the first security checkpoint and denied entry.

Imitation insecurity passes used by The Chaser to breach the APEC Australia 2007 restricted zone

In the following episode of The Chaser's War on Everything, the team emphasised that their only realistic attempt to disguise the vehicles was the use of a Canadian flag. Taylor later said that there was "no particular reason we chose Canada, we just thought they'd be a country who the cops wouldn't scrutinise too closely, and who feasibly would only have three cars in their motorcade—as opposed to the 20 or so gas guzzlers that Bush has brought with him". There were many deliberate indications that the motorcade was not genuine, particularly on the fake credentials used by the team; members' security passes were printed with JOKE, Insecurity, and It's pretty obvious this isn't a real pass all clearly visible, while the APEC 2007 Official Vehicle stickers included both the name of the series and the text This dude likes trees and poetry and certain types of carnivorous plants excite him. In addition, some of the runners were holding camcorders and one of the motorcyclists was wearing jeans, both highly unusual for an official motorcade.

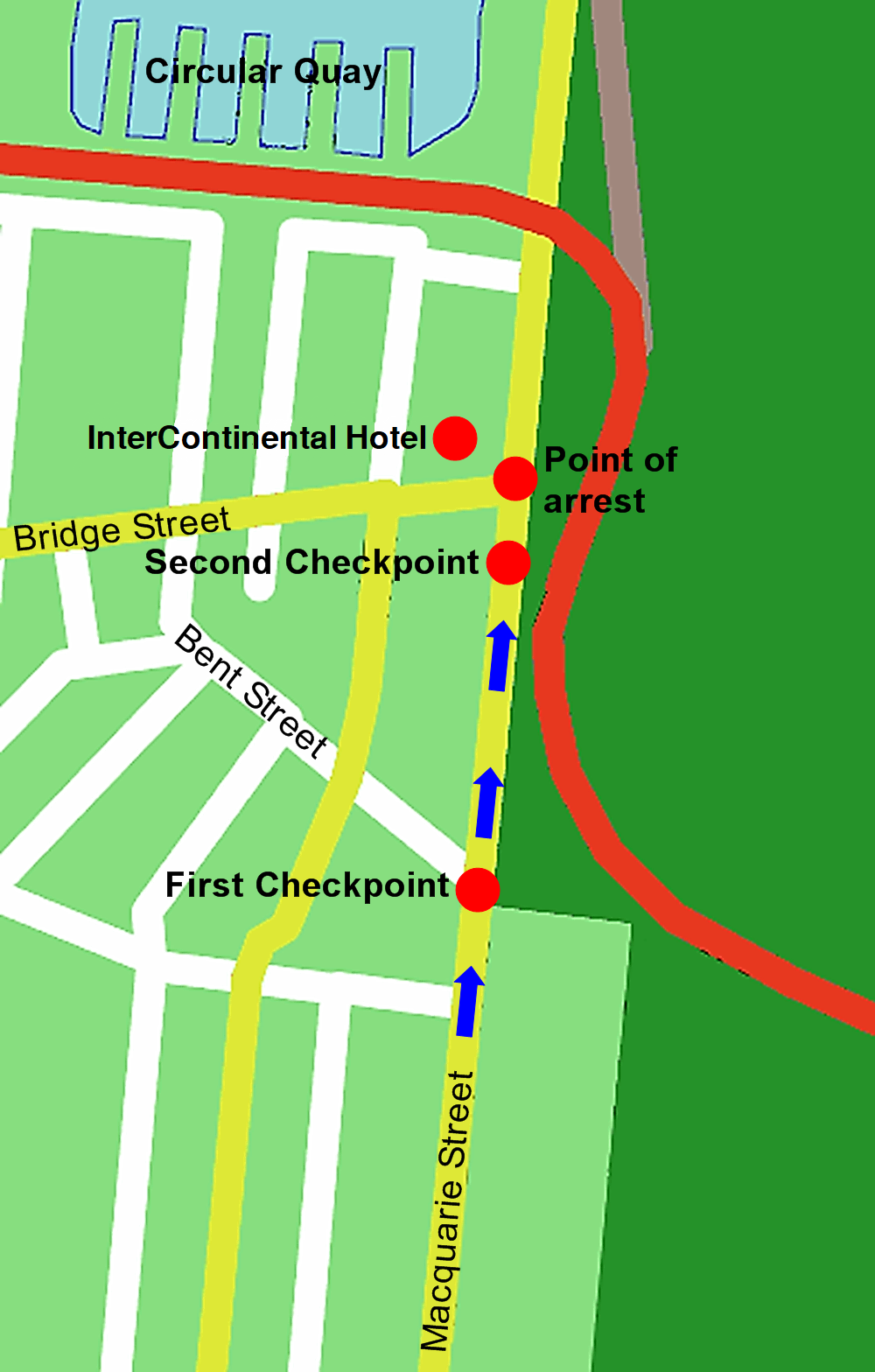
Map of the route taken by the motorcade, indicated by the blue arrows.

At 11:30 am (AEDT), the motorcade began its journey towards the "ring of steel", a fenced area at the intersection of Bent and Macquarie Streets. The vehicle (or vehicles) stopped for a red light and the police became aware of the motorcade's presence, but waved them towards the checkpoint. The convoy travelled through the first checkpoint without inspection and proceeded in a northerly direction to a second security checkpoint in the prohibited "red zone", just before Bridge Street. Both motorcyclists had by now separated from the motorcade, which was waved through the second checkpoint by police officers. It travelled further into the restricted area before stopping outside the InterContinental Hotel.

Morrow ordered the motorcade to turn around at the Bridge Street intersection because he realised that they had proceeded further than expected, and because the police officers were not going to stop them. With the motorcade partially turned, Licciardello alighted onto the street and complained, in character as bin Laden, about not being invited to the APEC Summit. At this point, the police requested Morrow's identity. After inspecting his fake pass, officers realised that Morrow was from The Chaser and took all eleven members of the motorcade into custody. Surprisingly, as pointed out by the team on their television show, the officers initially ignored Licciardello (Osama Bin Laden) and only arrested Morrow.

The arrested cast and crew were immediately taken to Surry Hills Police Station, where they were questioned and charged with entering a prohibited area under the APEC Meeting (Police Powers) Act 2007. Their cameras were confiscated, with Morrow believing that they had lost the footage. Nathan Earl (the programme's producer/director) then revealed to Morrow that he had hidden a tape recorder behind his scrotum. It was not discovered by police, and he removed it when the group returned to the ABC. All were released on bail to appear in court on 4 October 2007. Under the new legislation, the crew members would each face a maximum penalty of six months' imprisonment if they were convicted or up to two years if they were in possession of a "prohibited item".

== Aftermath ==
Following the breach of the APEC restricted area, the actions of The Chaser became the subject of intense debate among sections of the media, senior police officers, and government ministers.

=== Public response ===
Despite strong condemnation from some officials, the stunt was mostly well received by the public. A Sydney correspondent for the BBC reported that the Chaser team had become "folk heroes" after the prank, while 87% of the 28,451 respondents to a Sydney Morning Herald internet poll found the stunt "funny".

However, the ABC received more than 250 complaints, outweighing the 177 positive submissions. A spokesperson for the national broadcaster said that the results were misleading because people who enjoyed the show typically do not make comments. Around the country, around 80% of callers to talkback radio were supportive; and one third of all calls regarding APEC mentioned the stunt.

=== Political reactions ===
There were many critics among politicians and officials. Representatives of the police force in Sydney were among the most severe, and New South Wales Police Commissioner Andrew Scipione, the head of APEC's lead security agency, was angered because the comedians could have been shot by police snipers, who were "clearly ... there because they mean business. They're not there for show." In response, Licciardello expressed his faith in the snipers' professional ability: "They are highly trained, competent people and they're not going to shoot people if they're in an Osama bin Laden costume if they clearly don't pose a threat".

Many politicians, mostly from the Labor government of New South Wales, reacted to the security breach with concern and unease. Police Minister David Campbell expressed disappointment and concern over the stunt, arguing that there were "21 world leaders arriving in the city at the one time and it needs to be taken seriously". Then New South Wales Premier Morris Iemma said that while he was a fan of the show, those involved would have to face the full force of the law. The then Federal Opposition Leader Kevin Rudd, also from the Labor Party, voiced similar concerns, saying "I'm a fan of The Chaser ... but I think these guys have crossed the line".

Alexander Downer, the Minister for Foreign Affairs in Australia's Coalition government, was amused when asked to comment on the incident. He said the arrests proved that the security system had functioned properly, adding that "whatever you think of the humour of The Chaser ... they were clearly not going to harm anybody in a physical way". The incident also generated debate during Question Time in the Senate.

=== International recognition ===
The APEC security breach captured international attention and acclaim. A local newspaper in Canada saw the humorous side, despite the pranksters posing as Canadian officials. In the United States media reviews were mixed. Newsreaders from American networks such as the Fox News Channel, National Broadcasting Company, and CBS Broadcasting either "raised their eyebrows" or "had smiles on their faces over the stunt". After the high ratings for the episode and international recognition derived from the stunt, the program began screening in countries such as Israel, South Korea, and New Zealand; and other countries, especially in the Middle East, began negotiating with the ABC. The stunt was named the Best Television Moment at the 2008 MTV Australia Awards. Australian scholar Niall Lucy analyses the prank's political significance as an important act of deconstruction in his book Pomo Oz: Fear and Loathing Downunder.

=== Current affairs ===
On 6 September 2007, the tabloid current affairs program Today Tonight from the Seven Network aired a story headed "Dangerous Fools", specifically devoted to the APEC stunt. Host Anna Coren asserted that The Chaser were wasting taxpayers' money, and will "need more of those funds [in legal costs to the government-funded ABC] to defend their actions in court". Coren claimed that the ABC chiefs were too arrogant to reply to the program's inquiries. A media commentator interviewed in the report condemned the APEC stunt as "over the top", and said he could not see the humour of it. A security expert presented his view, saying that there was a serious risk of injury, not just to the crew members, but to onlookers outside the security zone, even though the breach was discovered by police officers well inside the prohibited area.

Today Tonight's broadcast criticised The Chaser's approach to the APEC event, describing the stunt as "[stretching] the boundaries yet again". The program quoted Morrow's radio comments about wanting "a stunt that can really hit the headlines across the world" as evidence of irresponsibility. The show also presented Craig Reucassel from The Chaser, responding to questions and claiming that the comedians were "hardly sorry" for their actions. Ironically, the report was made by Dave "Sluggo" Richardson, notorious for his hoax story "In Barcelona Tonight"; but Richardson, unlike The Chaser crew, had not gone through roadblocks in his stunt.

The rival Nine Network's current affairs program A Current Affair also aired a report. A Nine cameraman had seen the stunt unfold, and managed to capture it on tape. The report revolved around the incompetence of the police and security personnel, in contrast to Today Tonight's criticism of The Chaser's actions, and spoke of the group executing "their grandest gag yet", bringing together "the world's most powerful man and the world's most wanted, in the same place, at the same time", referring to US president Bush and terrorist bin Laden.

=== Legal action ===
After their arrest and questioning by police, all eleven participants in the stunt (eight production members of The Chaser's War on Everything and three hired drivers) were charged with "entering a restricted area without special justification" under the APEC Meeting (Police Powers) Act 2007. All eleven were granted bail, on the condition that they refrain from entering any of the APEC secured areas, and ordered to appear at the Downing Centre Local Court on 4 October 2007. Those charged were Esteban Alegria, Nathan Earl, Giles Hardie, Lauren Howard, Mark Kordi, Chas Licciardello, Geoffrey Lye, Alexander Morrow, Julian Morrow, Rodrigo Pena and Benson Simpson. After numerous adjournments, all charges were dropped by the New South Wales Director of Public Prosecutions (DPP) on 28 April 2008.

It was decided that the police, failing to notice that the presented security badges were fake, had given "tacit" permission for the group to enter the restricted zone. Further, the actions of the police on the scene, who themselves may have been unaware of where, exactly, the legally restricted area began, caused the Chaser team to proceed much further into the heart of the security zone than they had intended to or realised. This meant their breach of the law had happened largely due to an exculpating mistake of fact on the part of Morrow, who intended to end the stunt before crossing into restricted territory, but who received no explicit indications as to where that territory began − and was indeed waved farther into it by the police. The ABC welcomed this development; Morrow commented: "I think it's just great that justice hasn't been done". The police remained unapologetic.

The DPP argued that it was never the intention of The Chaser to breach security and that they were allowed into the restricted area only because of the mistakes of the police. The laws enacted for the summit meant that entry into the restricted zone needed justification, which could include police permission. The DPP stated that by waving The Chaser through, they had granted permission to be in the restricted zone. A further defence was available: all members charged, except Morrow, could argue that they were present for work-related purposes, and part of their employment was to be with Morrow, who was directing the stunt.

=== Show ratings ===
With all the hype and media attention directed at this stunt, the following episode of The Chaser's War on Everything on 12 September 2007, initially intended to be called The Chaser's War on APEC, was the program's highest-rating ever. In Australia there was a total of 2.981 million viewers: 2.245 million viewers in the capital cities, and 736,000 regional viewers. This stunning success made it the most watched ABC1 television program since 2000, and broke the show's own record of 1.491 million viewers in capital cities, set by the preceding episode.

The 12 September episode was downloaded one million times from the ABC's website, and in late February 2008 it was nominated for the Rose d'Or international television award for comedy, on behalf of The Chaser's War on Everything. The stunt depicted won the "TV moment award" at the 2008 MTV Australia Video Music Awards, and Nine Network's show 20 to 1 Pranks and Pranksters ranked it first in its list of "greatest pranks in Australian history".

=== The Chaser's response ===
The stunt that went horribly right.

— Julian Morrow, of The Chaser,

After the successful breach of APEC security, the comedians expressed their bewilderment at the incompetence of the security forces. Morrow and Reucassel went on radio to augment the initial reactions they had aired on the 12 September episode of The Chaser's War on Everything. Morrow pointed out that while they did extensive planning for the stunt, the one thing they "didn't plan for was success"; the participants were confused by the unexpected permission to enter the area, and unsure how to proceed; they clearly sensed danger, but the atmosphere was actually very quiet and subdued.

Licciardello stated that they did not know they had entered the red zone, and "we had the advice of our lawyers ring in our ears; 'Do NOT go into the red zone. You can go into the green zone if they let you, but DO NOT go into the red zone.' " He said that they "were absolutely sure we would never get past the first checkpoint. It was panic stations when we realised", adding that it was a "stupid gag that backfired". Morrow said that the purpose of the stunt was "an attempt to satirise in a silly way the very heavy security and the spin surrounding that security, it was a test of the old adage that if you want to get in somewhere the best way is right through the front door. I didn't want the stunt to happen in a way that resulted in people getting arrested. If we've made a mistake and crossed into the green zone, I'm very regretful about that." He said the only reason they impersonated bin Laden was because they needed a joke to get out of the stunt that they always assumed would never have passed security.

== Other stunts ==
In addition to The Chaser's major APEC security breach, the team performed stunts at the APEC Summit that received far less coverage in the media.

=== Pantomime horse at APEC protests ===
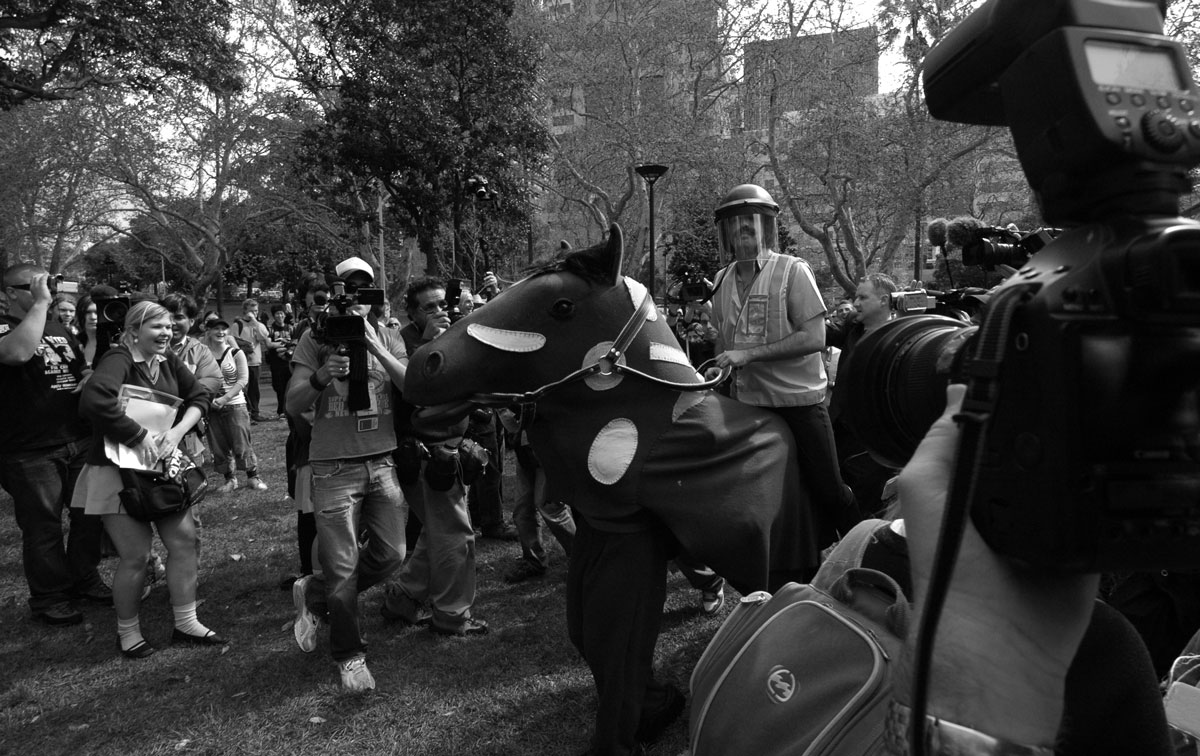
Chris Taylor rides the pantomime horse.

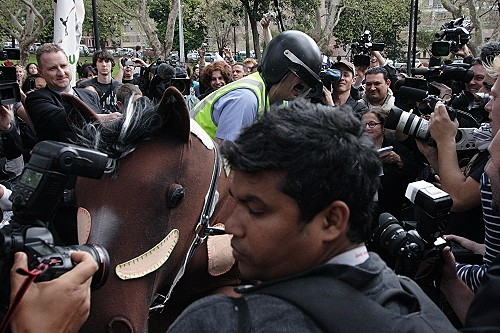
Taylor dismounts from the pantomime horse.

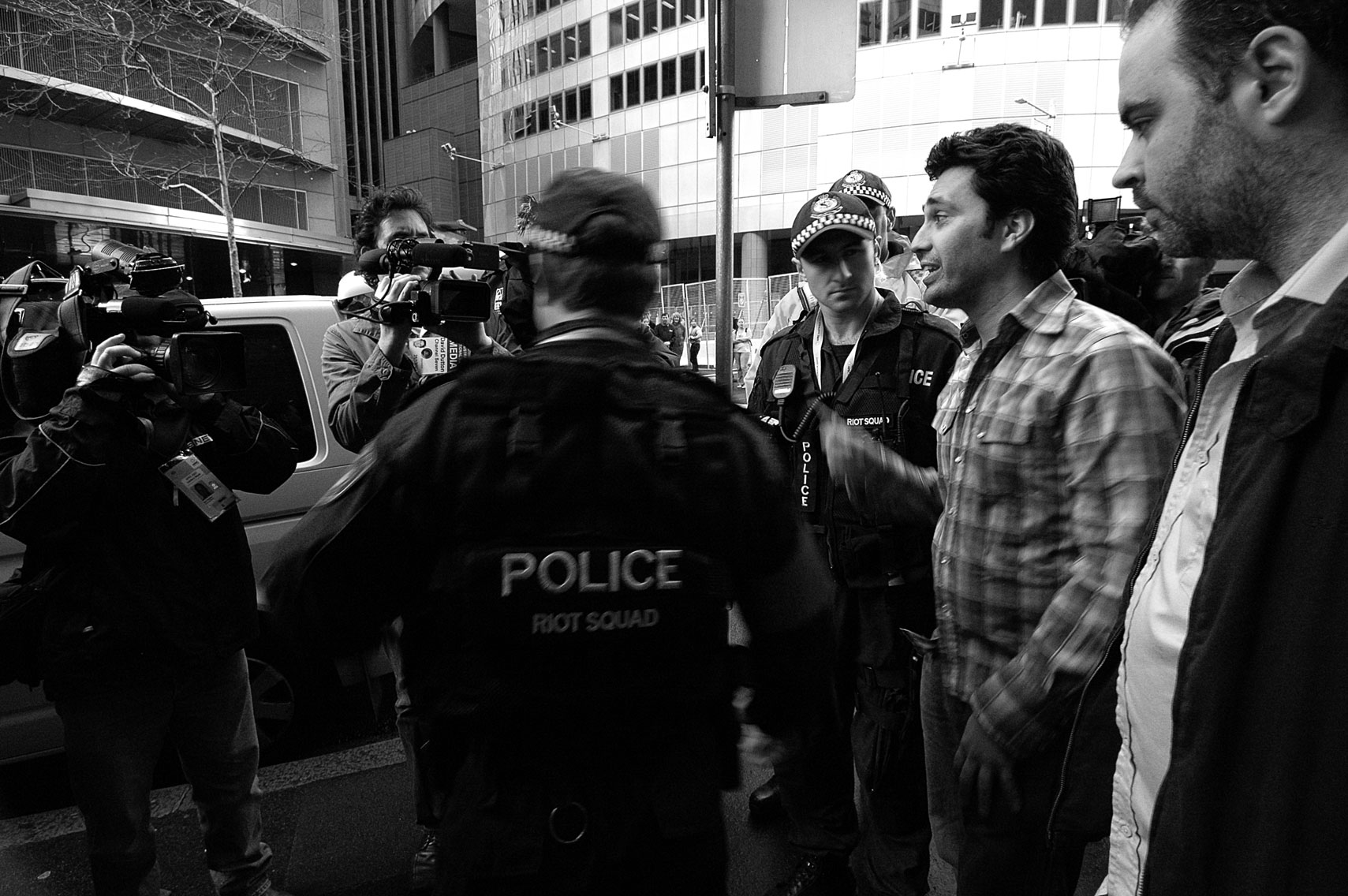
The Chaser cardboard motorcade: Chris Taylor and Dominic Knight (right) are questioned over the stunt, with the media looking on.

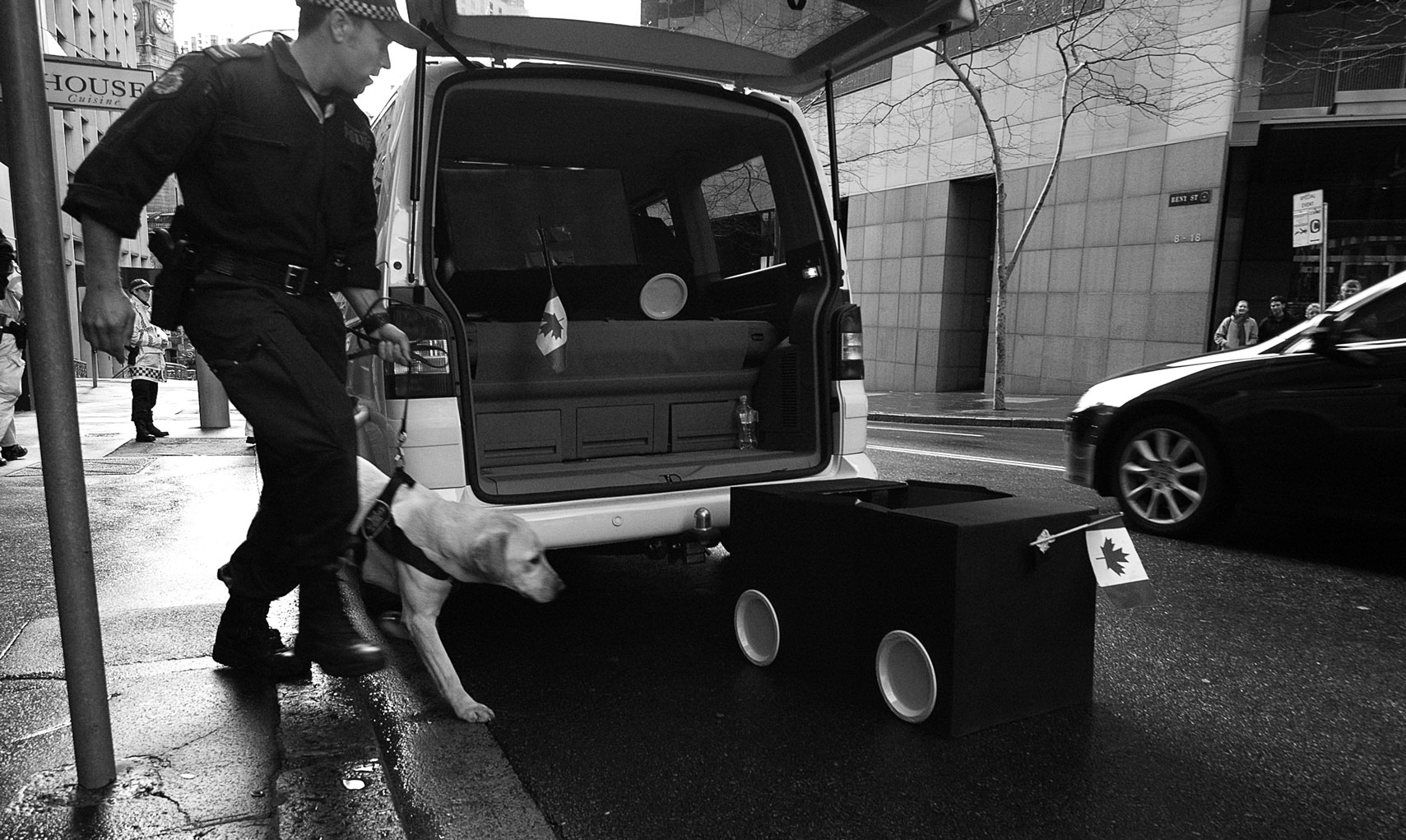
The Chaser cardboard motorcade: the cardboard motorcade used by one of the Chaser members involved is investigated by police.

On 5 September 2007, Chris Taylor, mounted on a pantomime horse, confronted police officers, who were on foot, and asked them if they needed any reinforcements against APEC protesters. When his offer was refused, Taylor took the horse for a stroll anyway, and was met by amused onlookers and media personnel. He was later asked by police officers to remove his clothing for examination, since it resembled a police uniform; but no charges of impersonating police were laid. The reference was to the horse flu outbreak, which forced police officers to face APEC protesters on foot. This stunt aired on the 12 September 2007 episode.

=== Canadian cardboard motorcade ===
On 7 September 2007, following the security breach on the previous day, Taylor, Reucassel, Dominic Knight and their film crew were detained and questioned over a follow-up stunt. This incident involved running near and attempting to enter the APEC protected zone dressed in cardboard cars mounted with Canadian flags, a reference to the flags' earlier use to disguise the successful breach by the real motorcade. Police had no choice but to release all members involved in this stunt, as they were outside the prohibited area. This stunt also aired on the 12 September episode.

=== Clothing for APEC photo ===
Shortly before 5 September 2007, Reucassel approached several APEC security personnel and offered a selection of clothing, inspired by the traditional official photograph of all the attending leaders wearing matching outfits. This stunt aired on the 5 September 2007 episode.

=== Assassination of Hu Jintao ===
Shortly before 12 September 2007, as part of Chinese President Hu Jintao's visit to Australia, Reucassel went to the Chinese Consulate and asked for them to prepay the bullets he was going to use to assassinate Hu, in reference to China's policy of requiring the family of a condemned prisoner to pay for bullets used in their relative's execution. This stunt aired on the 12 September 2007 episode.

=== APEC security checks ===
Shortly before 5 September 2007, Licciardello, who was dressed as a police officer, performed random security checks and procedures on members of the public to demonstrate the glorification of the tough APEC security measures. These procedures included random frisking, taking hair samples, telling tram riders in Melbourne to stand and turn their heads, and erecting secure areas in public toilets and near escalators. When Licciardello was approached by real security officers, he said that all of these measures were "classified". This stunt aired on 5 September 2007 episode.

=== Radio prank call ===
On 10 September 2007, Licciardello rang a talkback radio station pretending to be someone else, and complained about the stunt, claiming that it was stupid and anyone involved at the ABC, including Kerry O'Brien, should be jailed for ten years. This stunt aired on the 12 September 2007 episode, and Licciardello said he wished he had made the call on the evening of the security breach because talkback radio discussion would not have already died down.

=== RSL attempted entry ===
Sometime between 6 and 12 September 2007, Licciardello and Morrow tried to enter a Returned and Services League (RSL) building using the same fake passes that had gained them entry to the restricted area. The manager did not let them enter, which was proof, according to the team, that "RSLs are harder to get into than APEC". This stunt aired on the 12 September 2007 episode. However, in the DVD commentary of the episode, The Chaser stated that they were actually let into many RSL buildings with the fake passes. They claimed that acting as if one is meant to be present is usually enough.

=== Rival fireworks show ===
On 8 September 2007, Chaser members Taylor and Andrew Hansen launched a competing fireworks display to coincide with the official APEC fireworks display, which was only to be viewed by the APEC officials. The two displays were close to each other, with the official fireworks launched at the Sydney Harbour Bridge, while the rival fireworks were fired from Woolwich. The team lit up a large screen with the text Screw APEC. This stunt aired on the 12 September 2007 episode; and in the DVD commentary on the episode Morrow said the display was hard to orchestrate and not cheap.

=== Animals at Taronga Zoo ===
Shortly before 5 September 2007, Reucassel, equipped with suitable costumes, went into Taronga Zoo and impersonated real Australian native animals, in reference to the temporary relocation of some animals for private viewing by spouses of APEC leaders. This stunt aired on the 5 September 2007 episode.

=== Proposed nautical red zone breach ===
A planned stunt that was never executed was an attempt to breach the nautical red zone. Morrow and Licciardello were to perform it after the motorcade stunt on 6 September 2007; but it never went ahead, since they were detained by police after the surprising success of the earlier stunt. The plan was to breach APEC nautical security in "funny" boats, such as a gondola. Licciardello also stated on an episode of Rove Live that there was to be an attempt to breach APEC security "by lilo".
