= The Chaser's Media Circus =

Australian comedy and game show

- Genre: Comedy; Political satire; Game show
- Starring: Craig Reucassel; Chris Taylor; Andrew Hansen; Julian Morrow; Chas Licciardello
- Country of origin: Australia
- Original language: English
- No. of seasons: 2
- No. of episodes: 20

Production
- Executive producers: Julian Morrow; Martin Robertson
- Running time: 30 minutes
- Production company: Giant Dwarf

Original release
- Network: ABC TV
- Release: 15 October 2014 – 26 November 2015

The Chaser's Media Circus is an Australian television comedy quiz show which was broadcast on the Australian Broadcasting Corporation (ABC) television station ABC. The series was produced by the Australian satirical group, The Chaser, consisting of Chris Taylor, Julian Morrow, Craig Reucassel, Andrew Hansen and Chas Licciardello.

The show was a panel-like game and quiz show, with contestants using their knowledge about current media events to win. It was hosted by Craig Reucassel and featured Chas Licciardello interjecting occasionally with 'fact-checks'. The Chaser team members Chris Taylor, Julian Morrow and Andrew Hansen appeared as contestants. Guests throughout the series included celebrities, politicians and journalists such as Anthony Albanese, Hannah Gadsby, Lawrence Mooney, John Safran, Waleed Aly, Dave Hughes, Mia Freedman, Lewis Hobba, Peter Berner, Nick Xenophon, Tom Gleeson, Susie Youssef, Chris Kenny, Zoë Coombs Marr, Annabel Crabb, Alex Lee, Karl Chandler, Kirsten Drysdale, Zoe Norton Lodge, Stephen K. Amos and Tom Ballard. Formerly imprisoned Al Jazeera Journalist Peter Greste was on the show when he learned his fellow journalists had been pardoned by Egypt. It also featured pre-recorded satirical segments about news events and media coverage between live segments.

In June 2015 it was announced that the show had been renewed for a second season which would consist of eight to ten episodes, airing in the second half of 2015.

== Origins ==
In November 2013, the ABC confirmed a new series under the working title, We'll Have to Leave It There. Hansen announced on Twitter that the series will be filmed from 14 October to 2 December 2014. The show was renamed The Chaser's Media Circus and premiered on 15 October 2014. A second and final season aired on 10 September 2015.
