= The Chaser's Age of Terror Variety Hour =

Australian conedy tour show

- Company: The Chaser
- Genre: Comedy, satire
- Date of premiere: 2008
- Location: Australia

The Chaser's Age of Terror Variety Hour was a touring stage show by Australian comedian team The Chaser. It was produced by Laughing Stock and was the second stage show the Chaser team have produced.

== Production ==
The Chaser were originally formed by Charles Firth, Dominic Knight, Craig Reucassel, and Julian Morrow, and in 1999, they ran a fortnightly newspaper entitled The Chaser. Since then, they were joined by Chas Licciardello, Andrew Hansen, and Chris Taylor, who helped them with the satirical publication. Through the help of Andrew Denton, an ABC personality, the Chaser team produced various shows for the ABC since 2001, most notably The Chaser's War on Everything.

It was revealed on 4 December 2007, that The Chaser would not be continuing on with a third season of the War on Everything in the first half of 2008. They would be performing a new stage production entitled The Chaser's Age of Terror Variety Hour. The show's title comes from a working title used in the early production of the War on Everything, which was The Age of Terror Variety Hour. The show ran between March and July 2008. It stars Andrew Hansen, Dominic Knight, Chas Licciardello, Julian Morrow, and Craig Reucassel. As for the other members of the Chaser, Charles Firth had left the group, and Chris Taylor was not performing in the show as he was writing a new television series for the ABC.

It's going to be a hilarious jape of all descriptions that I can't tell you much more about because we haven't written it yet.

— Chaser member Julian Morrow.

The Chaser members in a promotional picture for the stage show. (Left to Right) Dominic Knight, Andrew Hansen, Chas Licciardello, Craig Reucassel, and Julian Morrow. It is the second stage show The Chaser has performed.

The Chaser's Age of Terror Variety Hour was the second stage show produced by The Chaser, the first being Cirque du Chaser, which was performed in 2005 and was highly successful. The show was produced and presented by the small stage company "Laughing Stock", which also produced and presented Cirque du Chaser. The Age of Terror Variety Hour was made in the same format, with sketches, songs, presentations, and interactive audience segments. The tour covered Adelaide, Ballarat, Brisbane, Canberra, Cairns, Darwin, Geelong, Hobart, Launceston, Melbourne, Newcastle, Parramatta, Perth, Sydney, and Townsville. Tickets for the show went on sale on 10 December 2007 for all shows except for the Melbourne shows, which went on sale on 12 December 2007.

Part of the appeal of doing a live show is that we can have a suite of material that we don't have to renew each week. But compared to the War On Everything, it will be a lot easier.

— Chaser member Craig Reucassel.

== Performances ==
The Chaser team performed the show at the following places and dates:

Dates	City	Theatre	Notes
26 March - 27 March	Wollongong	Illawarra Performing Arts Centre	Preview performance
28 March - 29 March	Canberra	Canberra Theatre Centre	First performance
2 April - 5 April	Parramatta	Riverside Theatres	Except 4 April
9 April - 10 April	Townsville	Townsville Civic Theatre	
11 April - 12 April	Cairns	Cairns Civic Theatre	
15 April - 19 April	Perth	His Majesty's Theatre	
20 April - 21 April	Darwin	Darwin Entertainment Centre	
28 April - 29 April	Ballarat	Her Majesty's Theatre	
30 April	Launceston	Princess Theatre	(Second show scheduled at 9.30 due to demand)
1 May - 3 May	Hobart	Theatre Royal	
6 May - 11 May	Sydney	Enmore Theatre	
14 May - 17 May	Adelaide	Thebarton Theatre	
22 May - 23 May	Canberra	Canberra Theatre Centre	Return performances
29 May - 30 May	Geelong	Costa Hall	
3 June - 14 June	Melbourne	The Athenaeum	
25 June - 28 June	Brisbane	Lyric Theatre	
1 July - 2 July	Newcastle	Newcastle Civic Theatre	
4 July	Sydney	Penrith Panthers	
5 July	Sydney	Blacktown RSL	
6 July	Sydney	Souths Juniors, Kensington	

== The Show ==
Some segments were:

- Anna Coren Segue Challenge: Hansen and Licciardello are challenged by members of audience to link two subjects together in a segue.
- Frank Forde: The Musical: In a parody of Keating!, The Chaser performed a short musical based upon the life of Frank Forde, known for being Australia's shortest serving Prime Minister, having a term of only eight days. Hansen portrayed Forde, with the rest of The Chaser playing various other members of parliament.
