= Andrew Hansen =

Australian comedian, actor and musician (born 1974)

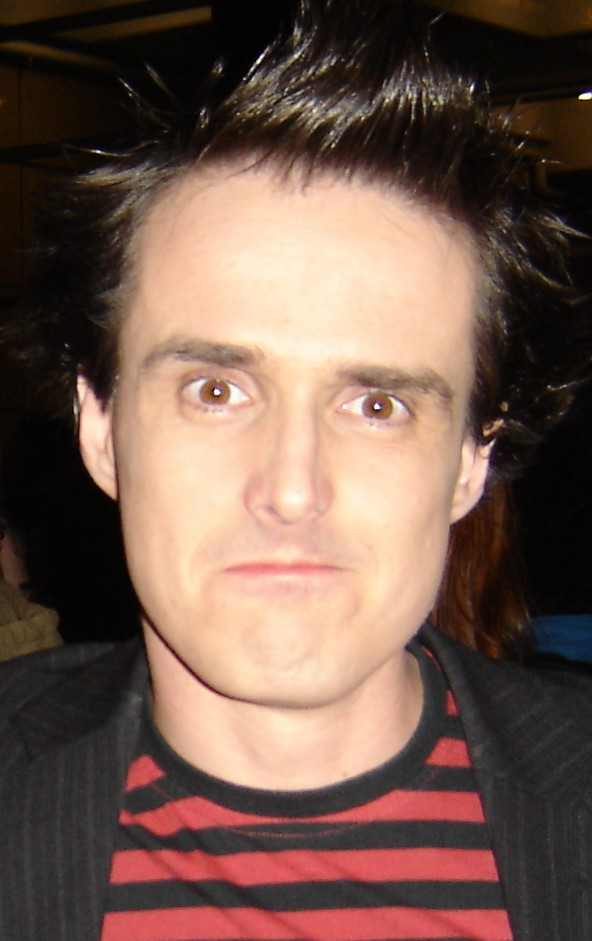
- Hansen in 2007
- Born: Andrew John Hansen; 18 September 1974 (age 52); Australia
- Notable work: The Chaser; CNNNN (2002–2003); The Chaser's War On Everything (2006–2009); The Hamster Wheel (2011–12); The Chaser's Media Circus (2014–15); Australian Epic (2023)

Comedy career
- Years active: 1999–present
- Medium: Print, television, radio and stage
- Genres: Satirical and musical comedy
- Website: MrAndrewHansen.com

Andrew John Hansen (born 18 September 1974) is an Australian comedian, musician and author, best known for being a member of satirical team The Chaser. As a member of The Chaser, Hansen's television work includes co-writing and starring in ABC Television shows CNNNN (2002–2003), The Chaser Decides (2004, 2007), Chaser News Alert (2005), The Chaser's War On Everything (2006–07, 2009), Yes We Canberra! (2010), The Hamster Wheel (2011–12), The Hamster Decides (2013) and The Chaser's Media Circus (2014–2015). He was co-showrunner of Australian Epic (2023).

He was a producer and regular panellist on The Unbelievable Truth (2012). He has also co-written and performed in The Chaser's stage shows, Cirque du Chaser (2005) and The Chaser's Age of Terror Variety Hour (2008). With Chaser colleague Chris Taylor, Hansen starred in a scripted radio comedy series on triple j titled The Blow Parade, which was released on CD and the iTunes Store.

== Early life and education ==
Andrew Hansen was born on 18 September 1974.

He was school captain of The Hills Grammar School in Kenthurst, and is a graduate of the University of Sydney, with honours in Australian literature and Australian history.

In 1996, he appeared as a subject in Simon Target's documentary Uni, about three students studying at the University of Sydney (Hansen later satirised Target in CNNNN, where he played the network's British correspondent who was also called Simon Target). Soon-to-be fellow Chaser member Charles Firth was one of the other two students featured, with Craig Reucassel and Chas Licciardello also making occasional background appearances. During the documentary it was revealed that Hansen suffered from clinical depression while attending the university.

== The Chaser ==
=== CNNNN ===
Hansen starred in The Chaser's satirical American news show CNNNN as the leader of the "newsband". He was also characters Rudi J Blass, director of "Newstainment", and Simon Target, an English reporter. Hansen's performance in the first season of CNNNN earned him the Australian Comedy Award for Outstanding Television Newcomer.

=== The Chaser's War on Everything ===
Hansen has been a regular writer and performer on The Chaser's War on Everything since the pilot episode.

Hansen is a pianist and guitarist and in addition to his songwriting, Hansen composed the show's theme music, which received the APRA-AGSC Screen Music Award for Best Television Theme (2006).

For Season 1 of the program, he received the Australian Film Institute Award for Best Performance in Television Comedy (2006).

==== "The Eulogy Song" ====
The most controversial song that Hansen has performed was "The Eulogy Song", which was originally written for Chris Taylor's play Dead Caesar, with music by Hansen and lyrics by Taylor. On the 17 October 2007 episode of The War, Hansen performed the song which satirised the lives of several deceased celebrities, including Peter Brock, Stan Zemanek, Princess Diana, Donald Bradman, Steve Irwin, John Lennon, Jeff Buckley and Kerry Packer, expressing the view that people with flaws during life are often disproportionately hailed as "top blokes" after death. The song became the target of significant media attention, with several radio and television personalities saying the song was in "bad taste", and both the prime minister of Australia, John Howard, and the leader of the opposition, Kevin Rudd, expressing negative views.

Hansen performed an updated version of "The Eulogy Song" in his 2020 tour. From 10 April 2021, performances of the song included a reference to Prince Philip, who had died the day prior.

== Radio and audio ==
Hansen composed the music for and starred in The Blow Parade, a scripted radio comedy series he made with Chris Taylor. It premiered on triple j on 28 April 2010. The series was released on CD and through the iTunes Store with bonus tracks. This album won the 2010 ARIA Award for Best Comedy Release.

Hansen co-presented Radio Chaser, a daily comedy show on Triple M, throughout 2017–19. The show spawned an album of 100 sketches, released in 2020.

He currently co-presents the comedy podcast The Chaser Report, produced by Nova Entertainment.

Hansen has occasionally hosted programs on ABC Radio Melbourne, including the summer and Easter seasons of its Breakfast show in 2019–20.

== Stage shows ==
Hansen co-wrote and appeared in the live show Cirque du Chaser, which toured Australia in 2005.

Hansen composed and performed the music for the Sydney Theatre Company's 2007 musical comedy Dead Caesar, which was written by Chaser colleague Chris Taylor. He also played the roles of Marc Antony and Lucius.

In 2008, Hansen toured Australia with The Chaser's second stage show, The Chaser's Age of Terror Variety Hour.

In October 2009, Hansen hosted The Goodies: Before, During and After, a live show by British comedy trio The Goodies at Sydney's Riverside Theatre (Parramatta) and at the World's Funniest Island comedy festival.

In 2011, Hansen joined various combinations of The Chaser team's members for a series of live shows in Sydney entitled The Chaser's Empty Vessel.

In 2014, Hansen and Chris Taylor toured Australia with a revue show of new songs and sketches entitled One Man Show. In 2015, they toured In Conversation with Lionel Corn, a parody of writers festival sessions.

In 2020, Hansen began touring Solo Show, a set of sketches and songs about people going it alone, performed on guitar, piano and iPad. He presented the show in Adelaide and Brisbane before postponing the remaining dates due to the COVID-19 pandemic in Australia.

In 2022, he toured Everyone Else Is Wrong, another show of sketches and songs. He followed that in 2023 with Andrew Hansen is Cheap, a show about the cost of living.

In 2025, he is touring Let's All Panic.

Hansen has appeared in multiple versions of the live quiz show Good Game Live at the EB Games Expo.

== Other productions ==
Hansen was the guitarist and one of the vocalists for independent Sydney band The Fantastic Leslie. The Fantastic Leslie was composed of Cameron Bruce, Tom Gleeson, James Fletcher and Hansen. In July 1999 the band released their 6-track EP A Tiny Mark which was distributed through MGM Distribution. He was also a member of independent alternative band Mending.

Hansen co-wrote the short film Garbage Man with Charles Firth and British comedian Henry Naylor. It was a Tropfest finalist in 2005 and a prizewinner at Germany's Ohne Kohle festival.

Hansen has had writer/performer contributions to the Nine Network's Comedy Inc. and the ABC's My Favourite Album. He has performed occasional voice-overs for ABC programs including First Tuesday Book Club and Media Watch. He composed the music for Nickelodeon's Sarvo and Napman, and songs for the Sesame Street character Ollie. Hansen appeared and presented at the 2007 MTV Australia Awards and the 2007 and 2011 ARIA Music Awards. In 2007, he made a guest appearance on Nine's The Nation. In 2008, he appeared in a sketch on SBS's Newstopia, as well as an episode of the Australian gaming TV show Good Game on the ABC, challenging the hosts to a 'Roffle Cup'. He also made an appearance as a guest host on the program in 2010, filling in for host Steven O'Donnell, again in 2011 filling in for host Stephanie Bendixsen and 2012 filling in for O'Donnell. He also made an appearance as a special guest in Good Game 10th year birthday special in 2016. In 2009, he made guest appearances on Network Ten's Rove and Good News Week. He appeared again on Good News Week in 2010, this time with Chris Taylor, in the guise of characters from their radio show The Blow Parade.

Hansen was the host of Strictly Speaking, a speechmaking competition series, which aired on ABC1 in 2010.

Hansen was a guest star in the Australian science fiction audio drama Night Terrace, playing the role of Horatio Gray in the second season, following a brief cameo appearance in the first season. Originally available only as a digital download, the series was later broadcast on BBC Radio 4 Extra as part of their "7th Dimension" programme.

Hansen has worked with Benjamin Maio Mackay twice, once on stage in 2016's Great Detectives of Old Time Radio Live and again in 2017 as a supporting role in the audio drama adaptation of The Phoenix Files.

== Bibliography ==
=== As author ===
- Hansen, Andrew; Roberts, Jessica (2018). Bab Sharkey and the Animal Mummies: The Weird Beard. Walker Books Australia. ISBN 9781760650001.
- Hansen, Andrew; Roberts, Jessica (2018). Bab Sharkey and the Animal Mummies: The Giant Moth Mummy. Walker Books Australia. ISBN 9781760650018.
- Hansen, Andrew; Roberts, Jessica (2019). Bab Sharkey and the Animal Mummies: The Spongy Void. Walker Books Australia. ISBN 9781760651183.
- Hansen, Andrew; Roberts, Jessica (2020). Bab Sharkey and the Animal Mummies: The Prickly Battle. Walker Books Australia. ISBN 9781760651190.

== Discography ==
=== Albums ===
List of albums
Title	Album details
The Blow Parade (with Chris Taylor and Craig Shuftan)	Released: April 2010; Label: Triple J, ABC (2740476); Formats: 2xCD, download

List of albums
Title	Album details
Australian Epic (Original Cast Recording) (with Chris Taylor)	Released: November 2023; Label: Australian Broadcasting Corporation; Format: Digital

== Awards ==
=== ARIA Music Awards ===
The ARIA Music Awards are a set of annual ceremonies presented by Australian Recording Industry Association (ARIA), which recognise excellence, innovation, and achievement across all genres of the music of Australia. They commenced in 1987.

Year	Nominee / work	Award	Result	Ref.
2010	The Blow Parade (with Chris Taylor and Craig Shuftan)	Best Comedy Release	Won	

=== AACTA Awards ===
The AACTA Awards are presented annually by the Australian Academy of Cinema and Television Arts. Before 2011, they were called the AFI Awards.

Year	Nominee / work	Award	Result	Ref.
2006	Andrew Hansen	Best Performance in Television Comedy	Won	
