= The Unbelievable Truth (TV series) =

Australian comedy panel game show (2012)

- Created by: Graeme Garden; Jon Naismith (original radio format)
- Presented by: Craig Reucassel
- Starring: Andrew Hansen; Julian Morrow
- Opening theme: "Would I Lie to You?" by Eurythmics
- Country of origin: Australia
- Original language: English
- No. of series: 1
- No. of episodes: 10

Production
- Executive producers: Julian Morrow; Maryanne Carroll
- Producers: Martin Robertson; Craig Reucassel; Andrew Hansen
- Running time: 30 minutes
- Production company: Giant Dwarf Pty. Ltd.

Original release
- Network: Seven Network
- Release: 11 October – 13 December 2012

Related
- The Unbelievable Truth (radio show)

The Unbelievable Truth is an Australian comedy television series on the Seven Network, based on a British radio show of the same name. The series is produced by members of The Chaser and Graeme Garden's Random Entertainment, and was first screened in October 2012.

The show is hosted by Craig Reucassel with fellow Chaser members Julian Morrow and Andrew Hansen appearing in alternate episodes. The show features guests spinning lies about a given topic, while slipping in truths which they hope will be undetected by their fellow players.

== Guests ==
- Episode 1: Toby Truslove, Kitty Flanagan and Sam Simmons
- Episode 2: Graeme Garden, Merrick Watts and Sarah Kendall
- Episode 3: Shane Jacobson, Kitty Flanagan and Sam Simmons
- Episode 4: Cal Wilson, Toby Truslove and Scott Dooley
- Episode 5: Scott Dooley, Celia Pacquola and Stephen K. Amos
- Episode 6: Virginia Gay, The Umbilical Brothers and Akmal Saleh
- Episode 7: Tom Gleeson, Scott Dooley and Claudia O'Doherty^{a}
- Episode 8: Scott Dooley and Kitty Flanagan^{b}
- Episode 9: Tom Gleeson, Virginia Gay and Toby Schmitz^{c}
- Episode 10: Jimeoin, Sarah Kendall and The Umbilical Brothers

^a Craig Reucassel replaced Andrew Hansen for his speech.
^b Third guest was replaced by a member of The Chaser.
^c Episode 9 was uploaded to the Seven website on 23 November, a week before the original airdate. The episode was taken down by Seven and replaced by episode 8.
