= Chaser News Alert =

2005 Australian TV program

- Created by: The Chaser
- Presented by: Julian Morrow
- Starring: Andrew Hansen; Dominic Knight; Chas Licciardello
- Country of origin: Australia
- Original language: English
- No. of seasons: 1
- No. of episodes: 10

Production
- Executive producer: Julian Morrow
- Running time: 4 minutes

Original release
- Network: ABC2
- Release: 22 September – 24 November 2005

Chaser News Alert is an Australian satirical news program which ran in the form of ten 4-minute episodes produced by satire group The Chaser. It aired on ABC2 from 22 September 2005 to 24 November and was also available via the Australian Broadcasting Corporation's broadband site.

== Episodes ==
No.	Original release date
1	22 September 2005
2	29 September 2005
3	6 October 2005
4	13 October 2005
5	20 October 2005
6	27 October 2005
7	3 November 2005
8	10 November 2005
9	17 November 2005
10	24 November 2005
