= Today Today =

- Genre: Satire
- Running time: 150 minutes
- Country of origin: Australia
- Language: English
- Home station: Triple J
- Hosted by: Craig Reucassel; Chris Taylor
- Created by: The Chaser
- Original release: May 2004 – 6 December 2005
- Website: Official Website

Today Today was a drivetime radio show on Australia-wide radio station Triple J, broadcast between 3:00 pm and 5:30 pm weekdays during 2004 and 2005. The title is a parody of the Australian current affairs program Today Tonight on Channel Seven.

It was hosted by Chaser members Chris Taylor and Craig Reucassel ("Chris and Craig"). The theme music to the show was the opening riff to the song "She Says What She Means" by Canadian band Sloan

The show combined political satire, comedic discussion of the day's events, and talkback from listeners with funny anecdotes on a given topic. Reucassel and Taylor also created satirical skits to play between program segments which lampoon commercial radio stations, current TV shows and topical world events. Other regular segments included the Small Talk Challenge, Two Types of People, Marketing Makeover and Pisslame Puns of the Week.

One of the show's recurring segments, 'Coma FM', was a parody of many aspects of Australian commercial radio. These included radio hosts' nicknames, a low-pitched Americanised accent, strange noises (such as the station's callsign), forced laughter at poor jokes, an emphasis on playing new music and not repeating any tracks, segments that play the "greatest hits from the 80s, 90s and mid-90s", large amounts of advertising and competitions – especially those that give away "cold hard cash". 'Coma FM' also mocked the target audience of commercial radio with the use of callers and comments on many controversial issues such as the Bali Nine.

In late 2004, Chris and Craig took six weeks off to rejoin The Chaser team to produce an election special, The Chaser Decides, during the 2004 federal election campaign. The fill-in hosts were Jason Whalley and Lindsay McDougall, a.k.a. Jay and the Doctor, who went on to become Triple J's breakfast show hosts from 2005 onwards.

On 6 December 2005, Chris and Craig broadcast the final Today Today program, and announced they and the rest of the Chaser team would be back on television in 2006. The show was The Chaser's War on Everything. The new host for Triple J's drive timeslot was Robbie Buck.

Chris and Craig returned to the airwaves in 2015 as part of Triple J's 40th birthday celebrations on sister radio station Double J.

== Bloody Sunday ==
On 16 July 2006, Chris and Craig returned to Triple J for a temporary run with their show Bloody Sunday. They replaced Roy and HG's Sunday afternoon show This Sporting Life for four weeks. The show's first episode listed a single banana on eBay.

On 10 December 2006, the program resumed in the same slot for 9 weeks over summer, billing itself as 'non-ratings period radio at its most desperate.' Listeners could often hear a TV in the background of the studio, as Chris and Craig liked to have the cricket or CNN on during the show. On the first show of 2007, Craig ran about an hour late for the show, illuminating the team's undivided devotion to the Sunday afternoon slot. The pair also predicted Naomi Robson's appearance on dancing with the stars in 2007.
