= The Chaser election specials =

Australian TV series

- The Chaser Decides Logo
- Also known as: The Election Chaser (2001); The Chaser Decides (2004, 2007); Yes We Canberra! (2010); The Hamster Decides (2013); The Chaser’s Election Desk (2016)
- Genre: Political satire
- Created by: The Chaser
- Presented by: Charles Firth (2001, 2004); Andrew Hansen (2004-); Dominic Knight (2001); Chas Licciardello; Julian Morrow; Craig Reucassel; Chris Taylor
- Country of origin: Australia
- Original language: English
- No. of seasons: 6
- No. of episodes: 20

Production
- Running time: Approx. 27 minutes per episode

Original release
- Network: ABC TV
- Release: 23 October 2001

Related
- CNNNN; The Chaser's War on Everything; The Hamster Wheel

The Chaser election specials are a number of Australian political satire based comedy programs produced by The Chaser. The shows, which have run under various titles, provide commentary on Australian federal election and has been produced since 2001 for ABC TV. The first show, The Election Chaser in 2001 was the first ever television production of the Chaser team. In 2004 and 2007 they produced The Chaser Decides which won the Logie Award for "Most Outstanding Comedy Program" for the 2004 series. In 2010, the Chaser team produced a 5-episode series about the 2010 election, called Yes We Canberra!. A new series was produced for the 2013 election, called The Hamster Decides. The Chaser's Election Desk aired in the six weeks prior to the 2016 federal election.

== Series ==
=== 2001 series (The Election Chaser) ===
The show was the first television production of The Chaser team, which had been running their satirical newspaper The Chaser since 1999. An ABC personality, Andrew Denton, offered the Chaser, as a collective, a contract with the ABC and they went on to produce The Election Chaser, which first aired on 23 October 2001. It was based around the 2001 federal election and was presented in the form of an election tally room, similar to the regular ABC election coverage. The presenters (panelists) were Charles Firth, Julian Morrow, Chris Taylor, Craig Reucassel, Chas Licciardello and Dominic Knight. The show was nominated for "Most Outstanding Comedy Program" in the 2002 Logies but lost to The Micallef Program, which also ran on the ABC.

Episode no.	Date broadcast	Mal award
1	23 October 2001	Philip Ruddock
2	30 October 2001	Jackie Kelly
3	6 November 2001	Natasha Stott Despoja; Mark Latham
4	13 November 2001	John Howard

=== 2004 series (The Chaser Decides) ===
Since The Election Chaser, the Chaser team had gone on to produce CNNNN, a spoof of various 24-hour news networks, which ran in 2002 and 2003. CNNNN won the 2004 Logie for "Most Outstanding Comedy Program". With the 2004 federal election looming, The Chaser team decided to produce another series based upon The Election Chaser. The show was titled The Chaser Decides and ran at the timeslot of 9:00 pm Thursday from 24 September 2004 to 14 October 2004.

The show was presented again in a National Tally Room, but only had four presenters in Morrow, Reucassel, Taylor and Andrew Hansen. Licciardello and Firth did reporting roles while Knight stayed on as a writer. The show was hugely popular and won the 2005 Logie award for "Most Outstanding Comedy Program".

Episode no.	Date broadcast	Mal award
1	24 September 2004	Malcolm Turnbull
2	30 September 2004	Tony Abbott
3	7 October 2004	Family First Party
4	14 October 2004	Peter Costello

=== 2007 series (The Chaser Decides) ===
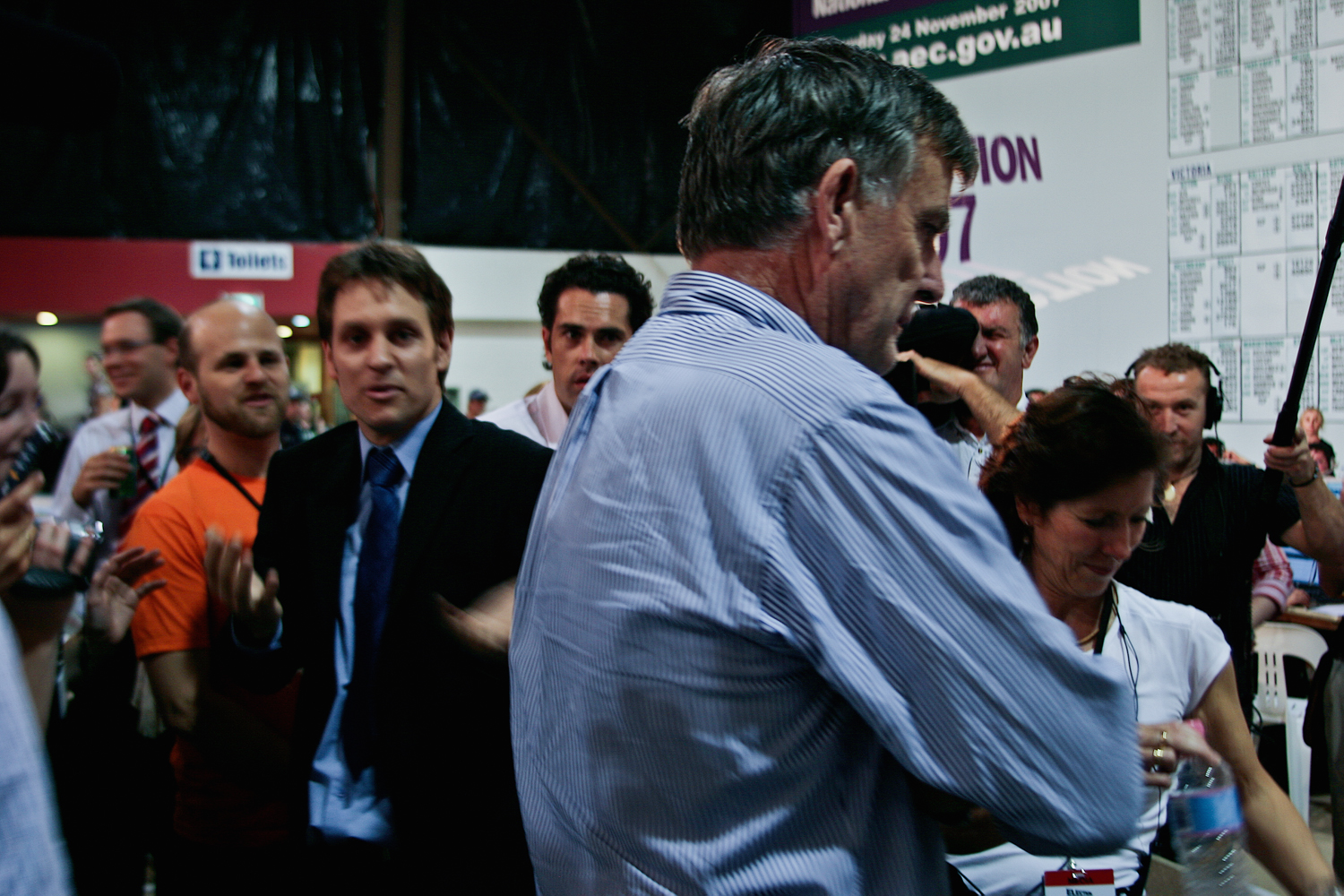
The Chaser's Craig Reucassel is pushed away from Senator Bill Heffernan on the 2007 Australian federal election at the National Tally Room in Canberra.

Following the second series of The Chaser's War on Everything, the Chaser crew produced two episodes of The Chaser Decides based on the 2007 federal election. The two episodes replaced the War on Everything in its timeslot for 21 November and 28 November 2007. The format took the same as the 2004 series.

Episode No.	Date broadcast	Mal Award	Ratings (Note: Metropolitan viewers, numbers in brackets indicate nightly ratings position.)	Nightly rank	Ref.
1	21 November 2007	Lisa Milat; Tony Abbott	1,421,000	1st	
2	28 November 2007	Jackie Kelly	1,378,000	1st	

=== 2010 series (Yes We Canberra) ===
For the 2010 federal election, The Chaser appeared in five episodes of the retitled Yes We Canberra!. Four episodes aired before the election date on Wednesday's at 9.45 pm and one episode after the election in that timeslot. This was the group's first television production in almost a year after the third and final season of War on Everything in 2009. The show premiered on 28 July 2010, with the election to be held on 21 August. The shows context was supposedly part of news program Lateline with the Chaser team being there to warm up the crowd for Tony Jones or Leigh Sales. To this effect the show was held on a set with the same design as Lateline (whereas the real Lateline set does not feature an audience) with Jones and Sales making guest appearances. This was changed for the final episode when the show preceded At the Movies, so that set design was used with guest appearances by hosts David Stratton and Margaret Pomeranz.

Episode No.	Date broadcast	Special guest	Mal award	Ratings	Nightly rank	Ref.
1	28 July 2010	Julie Bishop	David Barker	1,493,000	3rd	
2	4 August 2010	Tanya Plibersek	Steve Fielding	1,297,000	9th	
3	11 August 2010	Maxine McKew	Kevin Rudd	1,335,000	5th	
4	18 August 2010		Not awarded	1,250,000	9th	
5	25 August 2010		Karl Bitar	1,189,000	9th	

A DVD containing all five episodes plus extras and commentary was released by Roadshow Entertainment on 16 September 2010. Extras include deleted and extended scenes plus behind the scenes footage.

=== 2013 series (The Hamster Decides) ===
In March 2012, the Chaser announced the 2013 election series, tentatively called The Election Hamster. It was announced that it will be called The Hamster Decides and the first of five episodes was to air on 21 August 2013. When Kevin Rudd announced the change of election date from 14 to 7 September, the first episode was brought forward one week to 14 August. The show was run at a timeslot of 9:15pm on Wednesday. The set used was the same set as The Hamster Wheel.

Episode no.	Date broadcast	Special guest	Mal award	Ratings	Timeshifted	Ref.
1	14 August 2013	Bob Katter		962,000	10th	
2	21 August 2013	Doug Cameron		842,000	11th	
3	28 August 2013	Sarah Hanson-Young		896,000	10th	
4	4 September 2013	Anthony Albanese		1,001,000	6th	
5	11 September 2013	Jaymes Diaz	Kevin Rudd	902,000	10th	

=== 2016 series (The Chaser’s Election Desk) ===
The 2016 series, The Chaser’s Election Desk, began on 8 June 2016. New cast members that joined the series included Zoe Norton Lodge, Ben Jenkins, Kirsten Drysdale, Alex Lee, Scott Abbot, Mark Sutton and Hannah Reilly.

Episode no.	Date broadcast	Special guest	Mal award	Ratings	Timeshifted	Ref.
1	8 June 2016			783,000	8th	
2	13 June 2016	Bill Shorten (vox pop)		776,000	9th	
3	20 June 2016		Chris Jermyn	687,000	15th	
4	6 July 2016			655,000	14th	

=== 2019 series (Democracy Sausage) ===
In November 2018, it was announced that the ABC declined to fund an election special for the 2019 election. Instead, Taylor and Reucassel hosted a podcast, Democracy Sausage, available for free on the ABC's website. In the later weeks of the campaign episodes were also available on ABC iView and ABC Comedy.

=== 2022 series (The Chaser Report: Election Edition) ===
There was again no TV series for the 2022 election. Instead, Charles Firth and Dominic Knight did a free daily election podcast called The Chaser Report: Election Edition. Other members Craig Reucassel, Andrew Hansen, Chris Taylor and Chas Licciardello appear occasionally, as well as the "Chaser Interns", with occasional pranks uploaded to The Chaser's social media channels.

== Home release ==
On 3 December 2010, a DVD titled The Chaser Election Collection was released. It contained every election special The Chaser had screened to date, as well as special features including the never-before-seen The Election Chaser pilot.

== Jokes/Segments ==
=== Primary ===
==== The Mal Award ====
Every episode of the show ends with a member of The Chaser presenting The Mal Award, named after Mal Meninga's extremely short political career in 2001. Every week, the team present the award to a politician "for the greatest act of political suicide during an election campaign". In the 28 November 2007 episode, Meninga satirised himself when brought in to present the award but "gave up" mid-speech.

=== Former ===
==== "This Person Votes" ====
A joke featured in all but the 2010 series, the show would often feature short clips of people (usually drunk) acting ignorant towards the election (e.g. "I reckon Mickey Mouse is the best", "Who's John Howard?"), followed by an on-screen graphic that reads "This Person Votes." For episodes that aired after the election, it was replaced by "This Person Voted."

==== Scrolling newsbar ====
For the 2004 and 2007 series, a newsbar - similar to the one that would appear in CNNNN - would scroll across the bottom of the screen, with humorous news items. For the 2010, 2013 and 2016 series, it was replaced with fake Twitter updates from celebrities and politicians.

== Notes ==
Awards
Preceded by CNNNN and Kath & Kim (tied)	Logie Awards; Most Outstanding Comedy Program; 2005	Succeeded by We Can Be Heroes: Finding The Australian of the Year
