= Licciardello =

Licciardello is a surname. Notable people with the surname include:

- Carmen Domenic Licciardello (born 1956), American Christian music singer known as Carman
- Chas Licciardello (born 1977), Australian comedian
- Claudio Licciardello (born 1986), Italian track and field sprinter
