= CNNNN =

2002–2003 Australian TV series

- CNNNN title card
- Genre: News satire
- Directed by: Mark Fitzgerald; Bradley J. Howard
- Starring: Craig Reucassel; Chris Taylor; Charles Firth; Andrew Hansen; Julian Morrow; Chas Licciardello; Dominic Knight; Anna Skellern
- Composers: Andrew Hansen; Dominic Knight
- Country of origin: Australia
- Original language: English
- No. of seasons: 2
- No. of episodes: 19

Production
- Executive producers: Andrew Denton; Mark Fennessy
- Running time: 25 minutes
- Production companies: Zapruder's Other Films; Crackerjack Productions

Original release
- Network: ABC TV
- Release: 19 September 2002 – 14 November 2003

Related
- The Election Chaser; The Chaser Decides

CNNNN (Chaser NoN-stop News Network) is a Logie Award winning Australian television program, satirising American news channels CNN and Fox News. It was produced and hosted by comedy team The Chaser.

CNNNN's slogan was "We Report, You Believe.", a parody of Fox News' slogan "We Report, You Decide."

In April 2004, CNNNN won a Logie Award for Most Outstanding Comedy Program, an award that was shared with Kath & Kim.

== Overview ==
The program was presented as a "live" feed from a fictional 24-hour news channel, anchored by Craig Reucassel and Chris Taylor. Each episode had a theme which carried through the episode, examples (from the DVD) included:

- Lunchgate: A businessman accidentally leaves his lunch at home and is pursued by police and the media in an O. J. Simpson style chase and becomes a suspected terrorist.
- Cadman for PM: CNNNN beats up a comment by minor Australian politician Alan Cadman as a leadership challenge against Prime Minister John Howard.
- Shush For Bush: US President George W. Bush is visiting Australia for 20 hours, and is believed to want to sleep the entire visit. CNNNN exhorts Australia to be quiet so the President can sleep properly.
- Animal Farm: The Chaser "reality show" Animal Farm is a send-up of Big Brother. CNNNN covers the controversy when one of the contestants dies, but is not removed from the house.
- Packer Health Crisis: Live updates on the health of Australian businessman Kerry Packer.
- Tilt Australia: CNNNN aims to reduce the water-shortage crisis in inland Australia by tilting the entire continent to drain the water from the Eastern seaboard. Radio announcer Alan Jones was duped by the Chaser team live on air for believing this concept.

== Episodes ==
=== Season 1 ===
No.	Title	Original release date
1	"Terror Alert"	19 September 2002
CNNNN covers continual changes to the terror alert level.
2	"Terrorthon"	26 September 2002
CNNNN holds a terrorthon to encourage countries to pledge towards the war on terror.
3	"Peace Crisis"	3 October 2002
CNNNN covers the current peace crisis.
4	"Saddam Assassination / Make A Fortune Foundation"	10 October 2002
CNNNN calls for the assassination of Saddam.
5	"Telstra Triumph"	17 October 2002
6	"Tilt Australia"	24 October 2002
CNNNN aims to reduce the water-shortage crisis in inland Australia by tilting the entire continent to drain the water from the Eastern seaboard. Radio announcer Alan Jones was duped by the Chaser team live on air for believing this concept.
7	"Lunchgate"	31 October 2002
A businessman accidentally leaves his lunch at home and is pursued by police and the media in an O. J. Simpson style chase and becomes a suspected terrorist.
8	"Raid Rage / Melbourne Cup"	7 November 2002
CNNNN covers a string of ASIO terrorism raids.
9	"Forty Years of CNNNN"	14 November 2002
CNNNN celebrates forty years on air.

=== Season 2 ===
No.	Title	Original release date
10	"Fungry's on Trial"	21 August 2003
Fungry's is sued by an obese person.
11	"CNNNN Launches in Iraq"	28 August 2003
CNNNN launches a 24-hour news desk in Iraq.
12	"Saint Donald Bradman"	4 September 2003
CNNNN covers an outbreak of Bradman related miracles.
13	"Cadman for PM"	11 September 2003
CNNNN beats up a comment by minor Australian politician Alan Cadman as a leadership challenge against Prime Minister John Howard.
14	"The Eddie McGuire Virus"	18 September 2003
CNNNN is infected by the Eddie McGuire Virus.
15	"Harry M Miller"	25 September 2003
CNNNN hunts for Harry M Miller, lost in snowfields, to get his exclusive survival story.
16	"Shush for Bush"	2 October 2003
US President George W. Bush is visiting Australia for 24 hours, and is believed to want to sleep the entire visit. CNNNN exhorts Australia to be quiet so the President can sleep properly.
17	"Space"	9 October 2003
CNNNN follows the launch of Space Shuttle Icarus.
18	"Animal Farm"	16 October 2003
The Chaser "reality show" Animal Farm is a send-up of Big Brother. CNNNN covers the controversy when one of the contestants dies, but is not removed from the house.
19	"Packer Health Crisis"	23 October 2003
Live updates on the health of Australian businessman Kerry Packer.

== Cast members ==
The roles of other members of the Chaser team included:

- Charles Firth: portrayed a recurring satirical reporter on ''CNNNN'', appearing in segments such as ''The Firth Factor'', ''The Firth Report'', and ''Firth and Friends''. In these segments, his character presented exaggerated opinion-driven commentary and confrontational interviews as part of the program’s broader satire of 24-hour news and cable-news commentary formats.
- Andrew Hansen: appeared on the satirical television series ''CNNNN'', where he led the program’s "newsband" and portrayed characters including Rudi J Blass and Simon Target. His performance in the first season earned him the Australian Comedy Award for Outstanding Television Newcomer.
- Julian Morrow: appeared as CNNNN’s United States correspondent. His role included prerecorded segments filmed in the United States, including vox pops as well as in-studio appearances that satirised the conventions of television news desk reporting.
- Chas Licciardello: appeared in multiple roles on ''CNNNN''. He hosted ''Lameass'', a recurring segment parodying stunt-based television programs, and portrayed characters including “Mongoose”, a crew member aboard the fictional Sky Chaser 8 news helicopter. Licciardello also appeared as a correspondent and in various reporter roles as part of the ensemble cast.
- Dominic Knight: appeared as a weatherman/reporter on ''CNNNN''.
- Anna Skellern: appeared as a correspondent on the program.

== Regular features ==
Other regular features of the program included:

- A newsbar, which proved so popular it was made available on the CNNNN website.
- Market Research conducted by Julian Morrow in the United States, in which he asks civilians questions on topics such as which country America should invade next, and prompts the civilians to choose their answer from exclusively right-wing multiple choice options.
- Advertisements for Fungry's, a multinational fast food outlet with a yellow cow mascot (slogan: "I'm fungry!") Sell Massive Meat Burger (triple deck beef patties topped with mincemeat and salad), Bacon Shake and offal pie as well as Massive Meat Burger Tartare (Massive Meat Burger served raw) during Meatlovers Month, Big Breakfast in a Bun (three eggs, bacon rashers, hash brown, pancakes, a French croissant and porridge, once with coffee), Peking Burger (all-beef patty, prawn chips and Chinese sauce), the Chinese buffet, Pickle Burger (two pickles on a gherkin patty with pickle sauce), the Pickle Tower Burger (five pickles on a sesame seed bun), pickle fries and pickle thick shake.
- Advertisements for Boggs Lager, an irresponsible beer company which promoted heavy drinking and even frequently marketed alcoholic products with: "The strength of fifty-four beers in a single glass" (slogan: "[Let's all] Get Boggered tonight!").
- A Chaser Affair, a parody of current affairs shows Today Tonight and A Current Affair
- Rita + Lin: The Hyper Twins, a parody of The Powerpuff Girls. Each promo would feature a different villain, such as 'The Communist ABC' and 'The Powerful Aborigines'.
- Advertisements for Esteem cosmetics, whose vague advertising parodied the deliberately confusing manner in which cosmetics are marketed (slogan: "Esteem – because you need it"). Esteem advertisements had a penchant for spurious statistical claims ("an astonishing Impact Factor of 8", "85% more proven", "200% more European" "95% more womanly") and bizarre product descriptions ("Beautelligence", "Scien-suality").
- Advertisements for Lameass, a parody of the American TV series Jackass.

== Legacy ==
A DVD containing five of the episodes from the 2003 series of CNNNN (Lunchgate, Cadman for PM, Shush for Bush, Animal Farm, and Packer Health Crisis), as well as highlights from the fake advertising breaks, was released in November 2004.

In September 2005, Chaser News Alert started running on the ABC's digital TV station ABC2, shown every Thursday night at 7:55 pm. Chaser News Alerts are also shown on the ABC's Broadband website.

After CNNNN, The Chaser went to its next project The Chaser's War on Everything, which premiered on 17 February 2006 and featured similarly topical comedy to CNNNN.

CNNNN previously aired repeats on 7mate. The episodes retained their original endings with the ABC logo.

== See also ==
- List of Australian television series
- List of programs broadcast by ABC (Australian TV network)
- Onion News Network, similar program from the US
  - The Onion
- The Day Today, similar earlier program from the UK
- Talking to Americans
- The Daily Show
- Tooning Out the News
- The Colbert Report
- Newstopia
- Rick Mercer Report
- This Hour Has 22 Minutes
- The Beaverton
- Hot Seat
- Real Time with Bill Maher
