= Dead Caesar =

2007 stage show written by Chris Taylor

- Ewen Leslie and Andrew Hansen in a scene from Dead Caesar
- Original language: English
- Written by: Chris Taylor
- Based on: Julius Caesar
- Genre: Musical comedy, satire

Premiere
- Date: 2007

Dead Caesar was a 2007 stage show written by Australian comedian Chris Taylor from The Chaser. The satirical show parodied Julius Caesar, a play by William Shakespeare.

== Production ==
Taylor was persuaded, while drunk, by Brendan Cowell, director of Wharf 2LOUD, to write a play. He ended up writing a parody of William Shakespeare's tragedy Julius Caesar.

== Cast and crew ==
The crew included Chaser member Andrew Hansen as composer of the music.

- Director: Tamara Cook
- Music: Andrew Hansen
- Set Designer: Bruce McKinven
- Lighting: Stephen Hawker
- Choreographer: Raymond Mather

The main cast is as follow:

- Caesar: Toby Moore
- Marc Antony: Andrew Hansen
- Lucius: Andrew Hansen
- Brutus: Ben Borgia
- Cassius: Ewen Leslie
- Cicero: Alan Dukes
- Calpurnia: Monica Sayers
- The Messenger: John Leary

== See also ==
- Assassination of Julius Caesar
