= The Chaser =

Australian comedy group

- The full Chaser team (from left to right), Julian Morrow, Dominic Knight, Charles Firth, Craig Reucassel, Chas Licciardello, Chris Taylor, and Andrew Hansen appearing on the War on Everything studio together.
- Notable work: The Chaser (1999–2005); The Election Chaser (2001); The Chaser Decides (2004 & 2007), CNNNN (2002–2003); Cirque du Chaser (2005); The Chaser's War on Everything (2006–2007, 2009); The Chaser's Age of Terror Variety Hour (2008); Yes We Canberra (2010); The Hamster Wheel (2011–2012); The Hamster Decides (2013); The Chaser's Media Circus (2014–2015); The Chaser's Election Desk (2016)

Comedy career
- Years active: 1999–present
- Medium: Print, online, radio, television, stage & Christmas crackers
- Genre: Satire
- Subject: Politics
- Members: Charles Firth; Andrew Hansen; Dominic Knight; Chas Licciardello; Julian Morrow; Craig Reucassel; Chris Taylor
- Website: Official website

The Chaser are an Australian satirical comedy group, best known for their television programmes and satirical news masthead. The group take their name from their satirical newspaper, a publication known to challenge conventions of taste. The group's motto is "Striving for Mediocrity in a World of Excellence".

== Founding ==
The Chaser's earliest foundation was a satirical school paper called The Tiger, created by future members Charles Firth, Dominic Knight and Chas Licciardello as a way to "wring as much money as [they] could out of their expensive private school" while attending Sydney Grammar.

The three then met Julian Morrow, Craig Reucassel and Andrew Hansen at the University of Sydney while working on the university newspaper Honi Soit. Chris Taylor also attended the University of Sydney but never knew the others during that time, joining the Chaser later after volunteering as a contributor while working as a journalist in Melbourne.

In 1999, the group began their first newspaper project titled The Chaser as their time at university drew to a close, in "an attempt not to grow up" as described by Firth.

== The Chaser members ==
=== The "Boys" ===
The founding members of the Chaser became colloquially known as "the Chaser Boys" in the media due to their undergraduate style hijinks during the War on Everything.

- Charles Firth. Firth decided in 1999 that the founding members should produce a newspaper, and was at the helm of the newspaper until its collapse in 2005. Firth appeared in The Chaser's television and radio productions until 2004 when he moved to the United States so his wife could finish her PhD, instead serving as The Chaser's "American correspondent" until returning to take over the Chaser's publishing business in 2015.
- Dominic Knight was one of the founding members of the team. Although he initially performed in the Chaser's early TV and stage shows, Dom moved to a behind the scenes role after 2004. He regularly features in the team's podcast and radio work.
- Julian Morrow. He became the executive producer of the television series after Andrew Denton left the role in 2004.
- Craig Reucassel was a founding member of the team, and is described by the team as "the one successful one".
- Chas Licciardello started work on The Chaser newspaper in 1999 under a pseudonym. Licciardello refers to himself as a writer and not a performer, which is why he does the "edgier" stunts in the television series. Licciardello has stepped back from appearing in Chaser roles since 2016's Election Desk due to commitments with his current affairs show Planet America.
- Chris Taylor had gone to the University of Sydney but never personally knew the four founding members. Initially a long distance contributor, Taylor spent two years emailing his articles to The Chaser, before quitting his job to do a television series based on the 2001 Australian federal election with the team, eventually becoming a member of troupe. Chris has not appeared in the Chaser's TV shows since 2009, stating that he thought they were "getting a bit s--t", though he has continued contributing to their print, radio, and online work.
- Andrew Hansen started working with the online Chaser website in 2000 writing columns as a favour to his friend Firth. After two years, he was considered for a part in the Chaser's television series due to the need for a musical performer, and joined the team permanently in after that.

=== The Checkout team ===
Following the end of the War on Everything, a number of researchers and writers were elevated to on-screen roles for the new series The Hamster Wheel, with this team growing through four seasons of The Checkout, to 2016's Election Desk.

- Ben Jenkins
- Zoe Norton-Lodge
- Kirsten Drysdale
- Scott Abbott
- Alex Lee
- Mark Sutton
- David Cunningham
- Hannah Reilly

=== The Interns ===
Following the relaunch of the Chaser website in 2015, the Chaser held a competition recruiting "interns" to help execute stunts and pranks without being recognised by the public. This team took over the Chaser's social media channels in 2016 following the viral success of some Election Desk clips, with the interns now producing daily videos and satirical articles with occasional contributions by the founding team.

- Gabbi Bolt
- Aleksa Vulović
- Lachlan Hodson
- Caz Smith
- Zander Czerwaniw
- John Delmenico

== The Chaser projects ==
=== The Chaser newspaper ===
The newspaper, first published in 1999, was The Chaser team's first enterprise. Though the paper initially had a circulation of well under 30,000, the paper gained national infamy when their February 2003 edition published Prime Minister John Howard's private home number on its front page with the headline "Howard ignores the people. So call him at home on (02) 9922 6189". The prank came in response to Howard's dismissive attitude to half a million protesters marching against the invasion of Iraq. Howard's number was blocked by the afternoon after being flooded with calls, and federal police raided The Chaser's office.

In 2005, after six years and 91 issues, The Chaser decided to cease publication of the newspaper, due to an inability to meet production costs and the "large amount of time it takes to produce a paper nobody reads".

The newspaper was revived in 2015 as a quarterly publication, following a successful $50,000 crowdfunding campaign. The magazine managed to last just 20 editions before folding due to financial insolvency, with founding member Firth stating "in hindsight we probably shouldn't have spent $40,000 on our bar tab".

=== The Chaser Annual ===
The Chaser have released yearly annuals since 2000, initially based on the best of The Chaser newspaper, and then featuring a selection of articles from The Chaser's website since 2005. This was later expanded into a live touring show The War On The Year, as part of the Chaser's attempt to "squeeze some money out of the wildly successful and even more wildly unprofitable website".

=== Web ===
In 1999 The Chaser became one of the first independent Australian publications to launch a website, after Firth, a former computer shop owner, and Licciardello, a computer science student, built their own CMS from scratch. The site initially featured articles from The Chaser's newspaper, as well as a popular fan forum, and a directory of internet oddities run by Andrew Hansen which included stern faced reviews of all the pornography he found.

The Chaser's web presence expanded exponentially in the year 2000 after the spinoff site Silly2000.com, a parody Sydney Olympic website, went viral, gathering millions of views and international reviews.

In 2010 The Chaser caused media outrage after becoming the first and only Australian news service to be approved on Apple's iPad at the time of launch. Though the app generated a large subscriber base, the team stopped updating it within a year due to their "frankly idiotic belief that the iPad would be a fad".

In 2016 the largely abandoned Chaser website was relaunched with a focus on social media. By 2020 The Chaser website once again ranked as one of Australia's most successful media outlets, with the site's stories regularly topping the chart of Australia's most engaged Facebook posts.

=== Live Tours ===
In March 2005, The Chaser team wrote and performed a stage production Cirque du Chaser, the name a parody of Cirque du Soleil, performing stand-up comedy, sketches, live music, and video satire in a sell out national tour. The format was later pitched to the ABC as the show which would become The War On Everything.

In 2008, the team revived the format with the nationally touring stage show, The Chaser's Age of Terror Variety Hour.

In 2016 The Chaser teamed up with satirical website The Shovel to produce a new live tour titled The War On The Year, wrapping up the news headlines of the last 365 days. The show continued to tour nationally in a sell out run until 2020, when it was re-packaged as the online sketch show The Chaser's War On 2020 due to the coronavirus pandemic.

=== Radio ===
Following the success of the Chaser newspaper, the Chaser team were in high demand to bring their brand of satirical news coverage to the airwaves, with the team at one point providing satirical news updates simultaneously for three rival radio networks. In 2002, Morrow was tapped by 2UE to provide a regular weekly comedy slot of topical news headlines. In 2004–5, Taylor and Reucassel hosted the Triple J radio drive programme Today Today. From 2006 to 2007 Taylor and Reucassel returned to Triple J to host Bloody Sunday, while Licciardello and Knight also hosted a show on Triple M called Chas and Dom from 'The Chaser'. In 2010 Hansen performed the Aria award-winning parody show The Blow Parade on Triple J in what would be the team's final stint on youth radio.

The Chaser team returned to Triple M in 2018 with the afternoon show Radio Chaser, though the group opted to move from live radio to the podcast The Chaser Report in 2019, with Firth explaining they were "sick of the high pay rates and adoring fans that come with a free to air radio show."

=== Television ===
After two years of running their satirical newspaper, and various radio roles, The Chaser attracted the attention of TV star Andrew Denton in 2001. Denton signed the team on with ABC, stating "They've got the talent, the work ethic, the fearlessness, the desire".

=== Election specials ===
Denton helped the Chaser to produce their first television program The Election Chaser in 2001, a parody of the national election tallyroom. The show was nominated for the 2002 Logie for "Most Outstanding Comedy Program".

The Chaser Decides returned again in 2004, winning a Logie award, and was re-commissioned in 2007 to cover the 24 November election, winning the ratings in its timeslot.

The team returned with a similar formats in 2010 and 2013 with Yes We Canberra! and The Hamster Decides. The ABC chose not to recommission the election special in 2019, following the widely panned 2016 Election Desk. A podcast Democracy Sausage was instead produced by Reucassel and Taylor for the ABC, alongside a national live tour The War On The F*%king Election produced by Firth.

The team in 2022 repeated this formula, with members of the original team reforming alongside The Chaser Interns to create an election special podcast, a national election tour, and a politics themed satirical single that hit number 1 in the charts.

=== The Chaser's War on Everything ===
In 2006 The Chaser team signed with the ABC to produce a variety comedy show based on news reviews, studio monologues and confrontations with politicians. The project would be performed in front of a live audience compared with their previous news format television productions and was named The Chaser's War on Everything. The first season of The Chaser's War on Everything premiered on ABC TV on 17 February 2006. The series aired late on Friday evenings where it developed a cult following, drawing an average national audience of between 591,000 and 821,000 viewers each episode.

The Chaser's War on Everything returned for a second season in 2007, regularly attracting more than a million viewers per episode, with a brief break in June to cover the Federal election.

After a hiatus in 2008 to tour a live show, the team returned for the third and final series of The War in 2009.

=== The Chaser's Royal Wedding Commentary ===
Originally set to air on 29 April 2011 on ABC2, a Chaser special was to be shown based on the Wedding of Prince William of Wales and Kate Middleton featuring live commentary from the team members. However, a diplomatic row ensued, after the ABC were forced by the BBC and APTN to pull the show from being aired due to concerns from Buckingham Palace. In response to the decision by the ABC, Julian Morrow from the Chaser said, "For a monarchy to be issuing decrees about how the media should cover them seems quite out of keeping with modern democratic times... but I suppose that's exactly what the monarchy is."

=== The Hamster Wheel ===
In 2011 the Chaser produced a new topical news show for the ABC called The Hamster Wheel. The series aimed to "examine the contemporary media landscape, where everyone from journalists to political fixers is perpetually at risk of spinning out of control".

=== The Unbelievable Truth ===
In 2012 the Chaser made their commercial TV debut with the quiz panel show The Unbelievable Truth on Channel 7. Adapted from the popular BBC radio show by the same name, the show featured guests attempting to lie about a given topic, while slipping in truths which they aim will be undetected by their fellow competitors.

=== The Chaser's Media Circus ===
In 2014 The Chaser produced a panel news quiz The Chaser's Media Circus for the ABC. Hosted by Reucassel the show featured a panel of guests, and Licciardello as a 'brain's trust', interjecting occasionally with 'fact-checks'.

=== Other TV Projects ===
In 2005 the team produced Chaser News Alert (CNA), aired on ABC2.

== Members involved in projects ==
=== The Chaser productions ===
Year	Title	Type	Charles Firth	Andrew Hansen	Dominic Knight	Chas Licciardello	Julian Morrow	Craig Reucassel	Chris Taylor
1999–2005	The Chaser	Print	writer	writer	writer	writer	writer	writer	writer
2000–2010	The Chaser Annual	Print	writer	writer	writer	writer	writer	writer	writer
2001	The Election Chaser	TV	writer, performer		writer, performer	writer, performer	writer, performer	writer, performer	writer, performer
2002–2003	CNNNN	TV	writer, performer	writer, performer	writer, performer	writer, performer	writer, performer, producer	writer, performer	writer, performer, script editor
2004–2005	Today Today	Radio						writer, performer	writer, performer
2004	The Chaser Decides	TV	writer, performer	writer, performer	writer, performer	writer, performer	writer, performer, producer	writer, performer	writer, performer, script editor
2005	Cirque du Chaser	Stage		writer, performer	writer, performer	writer, performer	writer, performer	writer, performer	writer, performer
2005	Chaser News Alert	Online	guest performer	writer, performer	writer, performer	writer, performer	writer, performer, executive producer		
2006–2009	The Chaser's War on Everything	TV	writer, guest performer	writer, performer, composer	writer, guest performer	writer, performer	writer, performer, executive producer	writer, performer	writer, performer, script editor
2006–2007	Bloody Sunday	Radio						writer, performer	writer, performer
2007	Chas and Dom from 'The Chaser'	Radio			writer, performer	writer, performer			
2007	Dead Caesar	Stage		performer, composer					writer
2007	The Chaser Decides	TV		writer, performer	writer, performer	writer, performer	writer, performer, executive producer	writer, performer	writer, performer
2008	The Chaser's Age of Terror Variety Hour	Stage		writer, performer	writer, performer	writer, performer	writer, performer	writer, performer	
2008	The Race Race	Radio				guest performer		writer, performer	writer, performer
2009	Lawrence Leung's Choose Your Own Adventure	TV		creative consultant	creative consultant	creative consultant	creative consultant, executive producer	creative consultant	creative consultant
2010	The Blow Parade	Radio		writer, performer, composer	bass guitar				writer, performer
2010	Yes We Canberra!	TV		writer, performer, composer	writer	writer, performer	writer, performer, executive producer	writer, performer	writer, performer, script editor
(2011)	The Chaser's Royal Wedding Commentary	TV		writer, performer	writer	writer, performer	writer, performer	writer, performer	writer, performer
2011	The Chaser's Empty Vessel	Stage		writer, performer	writer, performer	writer, performer	writer, performer	writer, performer	writer, performer
2011	Lawrence Leung's Unbelievable	TV		creative consultant, guest performer	creative consultant	script editor, producer, guest performer	executive producer, script editor, producer, guest performer	creative consultant	creative consultant
2011–2012	The Hamster Wheel	TV		writer, performer	writer, guest performer	writer, performer	writer, performer, executive producer	writer, performer	writer, performer, script editor, director
2012	The Unbelievable Truth	TV		writer, performer			writer, performer, executive producer	writer, performer	
2013	The Hamster Decides	TV		writer, performer	writer, guest performer	writer, performer	writer, performer, executive producer	writer, performer	writer, performer, script editor, director
2013	The Checkout	TV				script editor, producer	writer, performer, executive producer	writer, performer	
2014–2015	The Chaser's Media Circus	TV		writer, performer		writer, performer	writer, performer, executive producer	writer, host	writer, performer
2015	Story Club	TV					executive producer	executive producer	
2016	The Chaser Quarterly	Print	founder, managing editor	contributor	contributor			contributor	contributor
2016	The Chaser's Election Desk	TV	writer	writer, performer		writer, performer	writer, performer, executive producer	writer, performer	
2017	Radio Chaser	Radio	writer, performer	writer, performer	writer, anchor	guest performer		guest performer	writer, performer
2017–2020	Extreme Vetting/The Chaser Report	Podcast	writer, co-host	writer, co-host	writer, co-host	guest performer		guest host	guest performer
Total:			9	22	19	20	19	21	22

== Controversies and well-known stunts ==
In July 2006, Licciardello faced charges of "offensive conduct" from the New South Wales Police Force, after turning up at a rugby league football match between the Canterbury Bulldogs and the St George Illawarra Dragons dressed up as a Bulldogs fan and attempting to sell fake knives, knuckledusters and balaclavas for a War on Everything sketch.

In April 2007, a 15-year-old boy duped YouTube into deleting all clips posted from The Chaser's War on Everything by claiming to be a representative of the Australian Broadcasting Corporation. They were later reinstated.

At the 2007 Logie Awards some of the Chaser team were "manhandled" by Crown Casino security staff on the red carpet before being closely supervised for the rest of the evening.

During Dick Cheney's visit to Australia in 2007, members of The Chaser team were included on the official list of terrorists, anarchists, and protesters deemed to pose a threat to the US Vice-President.

=== "The Eulogy Song" ===
The Chaser team gained notoriety and considerable media attention over "The Eulogy Song", written by Chris Taylor and performed by Andrew Hansen on 17 October 2007 episode of The Chaser's War on Everything. The song satirised the media's posthumous praise of deceased celebrities, regardless of their behaviour in life, and mentioned among others John Lennon, Peter Brock, Stan Zemanek, Princess Diana, Steve Irwin, Donald Bradman, and Kerry Packer. The song attracted comment from both the media and politicians including Prime Ministers Kevin Rudd and John Howard.

=== APEC arrest ===
Morrow and Licciardello were arrested by NSW Police on 6 September 2007 after driving a fake motorcade into the APEC security zone. The Chaser crew entered a secure area by masquerading as the Canadian delegation to APEC. They were arrested by police after Licciardello emerged from the car dressed as Osama bin Laden, near the hotel where U.S. President George W. Bush was staying. They were subsequently detained and charged with "entering a restricted area without special justification" under the APEC Meeting (Police Powers) Act 2007. The charges were dropped near the end of April 2008.

The day after the APEC stunt, police questioned Craig Reucassel, Chris Taylor and Dominic Knight and a film crew from the Chaser after they were involved in a second stunt in central Sydney. The three were released by police after being briefly questioned for carrying around black cardboard boxes dressed up as limousines.

=== The "Make a Realistic Wish" skit ===
On 3 June 2009 episode of The War on Everything, Taylor and Hansen were involved in a skit which was set in a terminally ill children's ward of a hospital, which centered around a spokesman portraying himself along with a doctor, from the fictional "Make a Realistic Wish Foundation" (a spoof of the real Make-a-Wish Foundation). The premise of the skit was that if the terminally ill children are only going to live for a few more months before dying, it is not worth spending money on lavish gifts for them.

The sketch received widespread negative coverage from media commentators. That morning, the Chaser team along with the ABC managing director, Mark Scott, apologised for airing the skit, and the ABC announced the following Friday that the show would be suspended for two weeks.

In 2021, following their most successful week fundraising on social media, The Chaser team announced that they would be donating the $2000 of profits to the Make-a-Wish Foundation as a "way to mend an old bridge", raising a further $3000 for the foundation from fans.

=== Opera House stunt ===
In October 2018, the Chaser made national headlines following a guerrilla stunt that saw the words "Advertise here, call Alan" projected onto the sails of the Sydney Opera House. The projection also contained the personal phone number of broadcaster Alan Jones. The stunt was conducted in response to a decision by the NSW government to force the Opera House to advertise a horse race on its sails, after Jones lambasted the Opera House CEO Louise Herron on air for refusing the ad.

As the Chaser were not producing any TV shows, the entire project was crowdsourced, with the team using social media to rally together a projector, generator, volunteers and a large barge; the latter going un-used after security on the Harbour was increased in response to the Chaser's tweets. Footage and photos of the stunt were circulated via social media before being picked up by various news programs.

The stunt caused a second uproar when broadcaster Kerri-Anne Kennerley publicly aired Chaser member Charles Firth's phone number on air in retaliation for the prank. Firth reported that his phone was "immediately inundated with texts of support and praise".

=== George Pell plaque amendment ===
The team made news in August 2019 following a spat with the Catholic Church over a plaque for cardinal George Pell, who had been convicted on child abuse charges (later overturned by the Australian High Court). Following the conviction, the Chaser team affixed an amendment to a public plaque commemorating Pell as the "Eighth Archbishop of Sydney", adding the addendum "and convicted paedophile" underneath. The Church's spokesperson denied to the press the addition had been made, claiming the video was "doctored on Photoshop". The Chaser's Charles Firth responded by saying "well, this wouldn't be the first time the Catholic Church tried to cover something up for which there is overwhelming evidence."

=== Twitter ban ===
In 2020, the Chaser's account was briefly banned from Twitter for election interference, after the group changed their profile to match that of President Donald Trump and encouraged the public not to vote for him on the day of the presidential election. This led to widespread confusion due to the Chaser's verified status on Twitter, with many members of the public thinking Trump had abandoned his campaign. Following Trump's election loss, the Chaser team claimed responsibility, stating that they "almost certainly influenced the hundreds of votes that decided crucial swing states".

The team's verified account status was restored in June 2021, only to be immediately suspended again within hours, after they impersonated Australian Prime Minister Scott Morrison and claimed he was deporting his daughters to Nauru.

=== Facebook news ban ===
In 2021 the Chaser website briefly took on the slogan "Australia's only news site" after a spat between Facebook and the Australian government saw all news temporarily pulled from the platform. The Chaser's Facebook page was re-instated within hours of the ban, much to the consternation of the rest of Australia's media, after the team changed their Twitter profile to mirror Mark Zuckerberg and tweeted at Facebook instructing that their page be re-instated.

The Chaser responded to their new status as "Facebook's only news site" by publishing a 600-point list detailing every instance of the sitting government's corruption while in office, which immediately went viral.

=== News Corp cancellation service ===
In 2018 the Chaser launched a service offering to "sit on the phone and cancel your News Corp subscription" in a campaign to force the news publisher "to stop fear mongering about trans children". By 2021, they reported having cancelled over 2000 subscriptions from customers unhappy with News Corp's journalism, reportedly costing the organisation $500,000.

=== Fairy bread prank ===
In April 2021 the Chaser Interns started a hoax petition calling for fairy bread, a popular children's snack, to be banned, in an attempt to bait News Corp into running an obviously fake story. Despite being called out on air by talk back radio host Ben Fordham, the prank was a success, with the story being picked up by multiple News Corp mastheads leading to a national outrage before being revealed as a hoax.

=== "Coal Makes Me Cum" ===
During the second week of the 2022 federal election, the Chaser released a song remixing Prime Minister Scott Morrison's words from the first election debate. Titled "Coal Makes Me Cum", the track was initially created by the team in response to a dare from a user on Reddit, before being released as a standalone track due to its viral popularity on social media. The song hit number 1 on the iTunes Australia chart, and peaked at number 10 on the weekly ARIA Singles Chart.

The song charted again in 2023 when it appeared at #136 in Triple J's Hottest 200 songs of 2022. This is despite the song not featuring in the official voting list, with Chaser fans instead staging a mass write-in campaign in an attempt to get the song to number 1.

== See also ==
- Chris Morris
- Charlie Brooker
