= The Chaser Annual =

Australian annual book by The Chaser

- The 2007 Chaser Annual
- Author: The Chaser
- Language: English
- Publisher: Text Publishing
- Publication date: 2000-
- Publication place: Australia

The Chaser Annual is a printed compendium of stories from The Chaser, published yearly since 2000. The book typically features a collection of the best headlines from The Chaser's website over the preceding year, presented in the style of their defunct print newspaper. Originally published as part of The Chaser's newspaper's business, the Annual continued despite the closure of the newspaper in 2005, with editions continuing to be released through to 2010.

The Annual was revived in 2016 as part of the Chaser's Quarterly Journal series in conjunction with Australian satirical website The Shovel. Since 2017 the Annual has returned to its original form, and is now sold alongside a national stage tour 'The War on The Year'. The show has sold out yearly across Australia since 2016, and has included performances at The Sydney Opera House, and a TV adaptation is in development for 2020.

== Reception ==
In a review of the 2005 edition, Lucy Sussex of the Sunday Age wrote, "It hits as much as misses, but when spot-on is as effective as a custard pie in the face." The Courier-Mail's Trent Dalton said that the 2008 book is "glib, often hilarious and downright mean look at the news events of 2008". Sunday Herald Sun reviewer Mitchell Toy wrote of the 2010 book: "There are plenty of times when the Chaser crosses the line, true to form, inducing a kind of cringy sickness about various topics that is as surprisingly refreshing as it is discomforting."

== Editions ==
As of 2009, The Chaser have produced ten annuals.

Release	Title	ISBN	Cover Description
2000	The Chaser Annual 2000: The Little-Read Book	ISSN 1445-9094	
2001	The Chaser Annual 2001: Bradman, The Cremated Years	ISBN 978-1-877008-06-1	
2002	The Chaser Annual 2002: The War On Error	ISBN 978-1-877008-33-7	Featuring photos of the World Trade Center, John Howard and George W. Bush on the cover
2003	Embedded with The Chaser: Annual 2003	ISBN 978-1-877008-88-7	Featuring George W. Bush and John Howard in Bed Together
2004	The Chaser Annual 2004: Intelligence Failures	ISBN 978-1-920885-38-0	Featuring "Australian Government" files on Paris Hilton (Available on Internet), Shannon Noll, John Howard, George W. Bush and Naomi Robson
2005	The Chaser Annual 2005: By Dan Brown	ISBN 978-1-920885-97-7	Featuring the Vitruvian Man over the White House in a parody of The Da Vinci Code
2006	50 Golden Years of The Chaser	ISBN 978-1-921145-32-2	
2006	The Chaser Annual 2006: Burqa's Backyard	ISBN 978-1-921145-61-2	Featuring John Howard, Michelle Leslie, and others, wearing Burqas)
2007	The Chaser Annual 2007: The Other Secret	ISBN 978-1-921351-08-2	A Parody of The Secret with the background text saying "The Secret is Bullshit"
2008	The Chaser Annual 2008: The Little Rudd Book	ISBN 978-1-921351-85-3	A Play on Prime Minister Kevin Rudd and Chairman Mao's Little Red Book
2009	The Chaser Annual 2009: The Email Eunuch	ISBN 978-1-921520-80-8	A Parody of Utegate, with the picture of Opposition Leader Malcolm Turnbull
2010	The Chaser Annual 2010: Eat Pray Vomit	ISBN 978-1-921656-73-6	A Parody of Eat, Pray, Love, with the picture of Eat Written in Pasta, Pray in beads and Vomit in Vomit
2016	The Chaser/Shovel Annual 2016-2116: The next 100 years of the Chaser Annual		A two sided cover, the Chaser half depicting a future Australia living room under water due to climate change, and the Shovel half parodying a women's magazine featuring Pauline Hanson.
2017	The Chaser/Shovel Annual 2017		A two sided cover, Chaser side parodying the same-sex marriage plebiscite asking whether Australia should join North Korea or Trump in the impending nuclear apocalypse, and the Shovel half depicting a fake glossy magazine featuring Prime Minister Turnbull digging his own grave with a shovel.
2018	The Chaser Annual 2018		A two sided cover, Chaser side featuring Rupert Murdoch operating Prime Minister Scott Morrison as a puppet, the Shovel side featuring Scott Morrison dressed as a miner hugging a lump of coal.
2019	The Chaser Annual 2019		A two sided cover, Chaser side featuring Peter Dutton showing off his 'family' (a basket of potatoes), the Shovel side featuring Scott Morrison and Donald Trump giving a thumbs up as they stand waist deep in rising water.
2020	The Chaser Annual 2020		A two sided cover, Chaser side featuring Donald Trump drinking bleach in an attempt to cure coronavirus, and Shovel side featuring Pete Evans dressed as a doctor wearing a tin foil hat.
