= Dominic Knight =

Australian comedian and writer

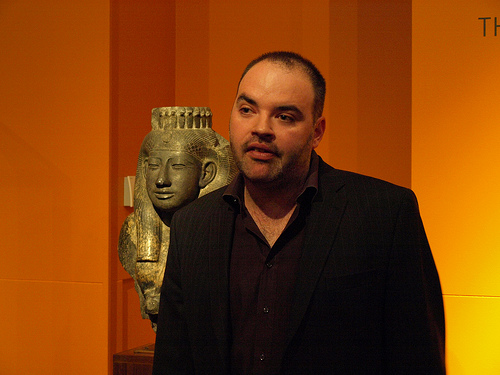
- Born: Dominic John Sebastian Knight; 26 January 1977 (age 49); Sydney, New South Wales, Australia
- Other name: Dom Knight
- Education: Sydney Grammar School; University of Sydney; University of Technology Sydney
- Notable work: CNNNN (2002–2003); The Chaser's War on Everything (2006–2007)

Comedy career
- Years active: 1999 – present
- Medium: Radio, television, print and author of fiction
- Genre: Satirical comedy
- Website: www.domknight.com

Dominic John Sebastian Knight (born 26 January 1977) is an Australian novelist, comedy writer, radio host and media commentator. Best known as a member of the Australian political satire comedy Logie Award–winning group The Chaser, he is also an occasional writer, columnist and blogger for The Sydney Morning Herald, and a former host of Evenings on ABC Local Radio across NSW and the ACT. Along with fellow Sydney University students Charles Firth, Julian Morrow and Craig Reucassel, Knight founded The Chaser newspaper, launched in May 1999.

== Early and personal life ==
Knight was educated at Sydney Grammar School, where he met fellow Chaser members Chas Licciardello and Charles Firth. He holds a Bachelor of Laws degree from the University of Sydney, a Master of Arts in Professional Writing from the University of Technology, Sydney, and a Doctor of Arts from the University of Sydney. He is the brother of Australian painter Jasper Knight and the grandson of former Reserve Bank Governor Sir Harold Knight.

== Career ==
He worked as a writer on The Hamster Wheel, an Australian Broadcasting Corporation television program which was written and performed by the members of The Chaser comedy group. Unlike his colleagues, Knight rarely presents on the program on-screen but has done some cameo appearances: television credits include Chaser News Alert and his role as a reporter for two series of CNNNN. He also contributed to the commentary track for the second volume of The Chaser's War on Everything DVD.

During January 2007, he acted as Triple M's drive time summer fill-in along with Chas Licciardello. Their show, Chas and Dom from 'The Chaser', aired between 4 pm and 6 pm on weekdays from 2 to 25 January, and often included guest appearances from their Chaser colleagues.

Knight also writes for The Sydney Morning Herald, contributing opinion pieces, wrote for the now defunct liftout Radar, and blogged on the 2007 New South Wales election campaign. He writes a weekly column for the Fairfax Media website Daily Life.

In recent years, he has appeared on the national television political commentary programs Paul Murray Live on Sky News Australia and The Drum on ABC News 24.

In January 2012, Knight replaced Robbie Buck as the Evenings presenter on 702 ABC Sydney, 1233 ABC Newcastle, 666 ABC Canberra and ABC Local Radio stations across New South Wales. He left the show in April 2016 and has presented other programs on the network on a casual basis since. He succeeded the retiring Tony Delroy as interim Nightlife presenter in September and October 2016.

Knight is back on Triple M Sydney with Radio Chaser from 3–4 pm Weekdays and nationally with the Platinum Edition on Saturday.

== Published works ==
- Disco Boy (paperback). Sydney: Bantam. 2009. ISBN 9781741666267.; a humorous novel.
- Comrades (paperback). North Sydney: Bantam. 2010. ISBN 9781863256407.;< a humorous noel which concerned a fictional student election at the University of Sydney.
- Man Vs Child (paperback). North Sydney: Random House. 2013. ISBN 9781742753218.; a romantic fictional novel.
- Strayapedia (paperback). Allen & Unwin. 2017. ISBN 9781760296070. A satirical overview of Australia, acknowledging a debt to Wikipedia; a portion of the proceeds is promised to the Wikimedia Foundation [op cit, p. 1]
- The dictionary of terrible ideas, 2025.
