= Craig Reucassel =

Australian writer and comedian

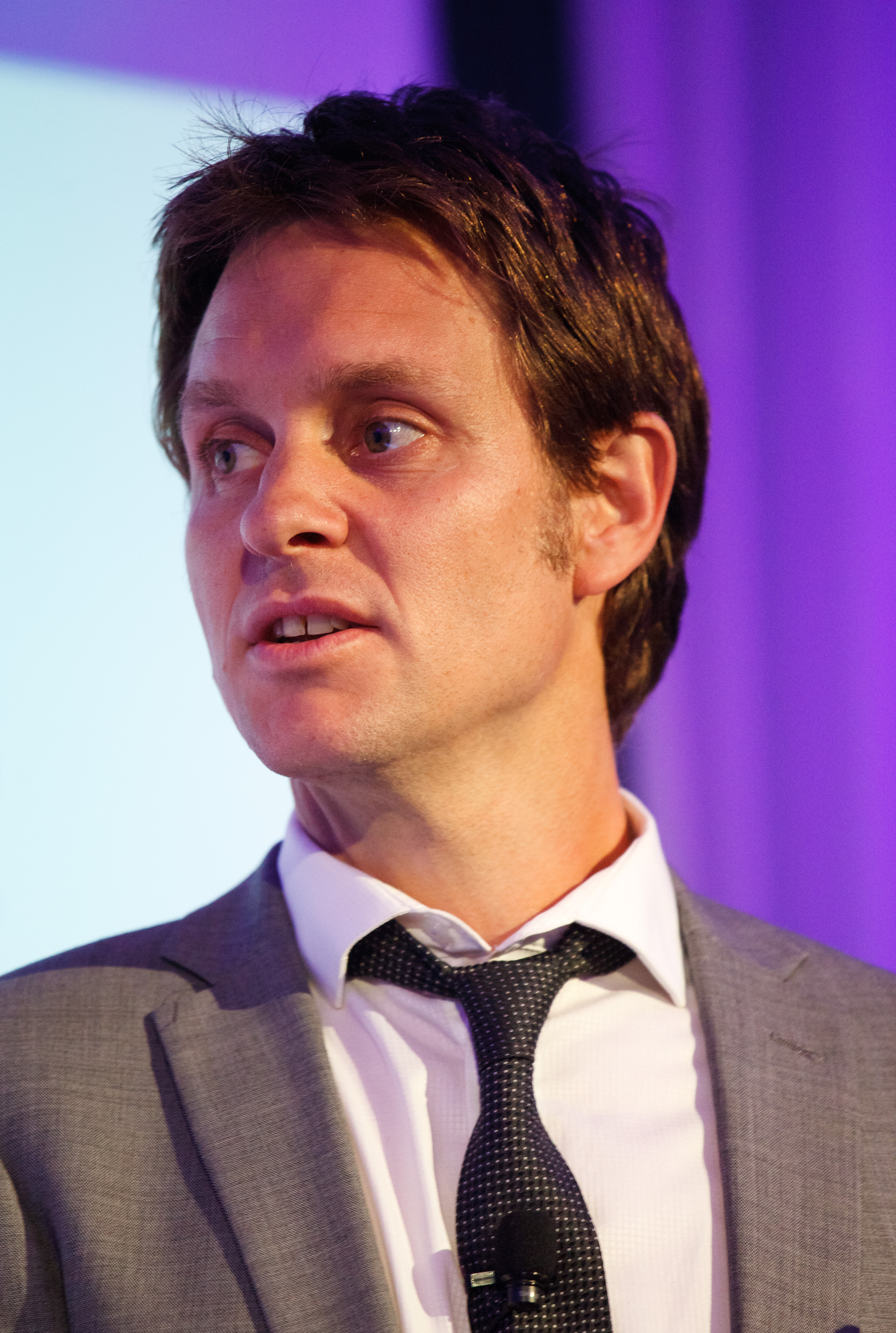
- Reucassel in 2013
- Born: Craig Bruce Reucassel; South Africa
- Notable work: The Chaser; The Chaser Decides (2001, 2004, 2007); CNNNN (2002–03); The Chaser's War on Everything (2006–07, 2009); The Chaser's Age of Terror Variety Hour (2008); Yes We Canberra! (2010); The Checkout (2013–2018); The Hamster Decides (2013); War on Waste (2017–23)
- Children: 2

Comedy career
- Years active: 1999–present
- Medium: Radio, television, print and stage
- Genre: Satirical comedy
- Craig Reucassel's voice Reucassel speaking about sustainable energy Recorded 9 May 2025
- Website: chaser.com.au

Craig Bruce Reucassel is an Australian radio and television presenter and comedian. He is currently the presenter of Breakfast on ABC Radio Sydney.

He was an original member of the satirical team, The Chaser.

== Early life ==
Reucassel was born in South Africa and moved to Adelaide at a young age with his parents. There, he attended Semaphore Park Primary School. The family relocated to the Southern Highlands of New South Wales, and Reucassel attended Bowral Public School and Bowral High School.

Reucassel attended the University of Sydney, and completed a Bachelor of Economics (Social Science) degree in 1999 and graduated with a Bachelor of Laws degree in 2002. Reucassel ran the arts revue and the canoe club, and was an editor of the student newspaper Honi Soit. He also debated at several World Universities Debating Championships, ranking 30th in the world at Manila in 1999 and 167th in Glasgow in 2001. In 2000, he competed in the Philip C. Jessup Cup international law mooting competition, his team winning the Australian rounds. He graduated from the Sydney Law School, along with Chaser colleagues Julian Morrow, Dominic Knight and Chas Licciardello.

== Triple J ==
In 2004 and 2005, Reucassel embarked on a radio career, co-hosting the drive-time show "Today Today" on Triple J alongside his fellow Chaser, Chris Taylor.

Following their successful stint on drive-time radio, Reucassel and Taylor reunited for their Sunday afternoon show, "Bloody Sunday", which saw them return for relief shifts in mid-2006 and during the summer of 2006–07.

== The Chaser's War on Everything ==
Reucassel played a pivotal role as a founding member of the acclaimed satirical group, The Chaser team. His contributions extended across various media platforms, including their satirical newspaper and several television programs aired on ABC TV. Notable among these were "The Election Chaser", "CNNNN", "The Chaser Decides" and "The Chaser's War on Everything".

Reucassel's involvement with "The War" has been significant, spanning from its pilot episode to its subsequent successes. Additionally, his personal life includes a partnership with his wife Keisha, with whom he shares three children, one of whom made appearances in sketches featured on "The War".

Reucassel is known for his daring and humorous confrontations of politicians. On 2 August 2006, Reucassel responded to a news story about a school student who had hugged then-Prime Minister John Howard while holding a screwdriver by approaching Howard during a morning walk and asking for a hug while holding a large plastic battle axe. Howard indeed hugged Reucassel but refused a later attempt when Reucassel reappeared with a running chainsaw. Cut out from the televised segment was an unsuccessful attempt that took place between the axe and the chainsaw, in which Reucassel was holding a four-point-star mace.

On 19 March 2007, another incident unfolded when Reucassel, parodying New South Wales opposition leader Peter Debnam's penchant for campaign appearances in swimwear, attended a campaign event dressed in nothing but Speedos and a baseball cap. As TV cameras shifted their focus away from Debnam, Reucassel quipped, "Sorry, I'm not Peter Debnam, he's over there. Just because I'm wearing this doesn't mean I'm Peter Debnam." Reucassel's attempts did not elicit a response from the opposition leader.

== Television career ==
One of his notable hosting roles was on the Australian adaptation of Balls of Steel, which premiered in April 2011.

Since 2013, Reucassel, alongside fellow Chaser member Julian Morrow, has been a main presenter on the ABC program The Checkout. This show delves into consumer rights and exposes unethical business practices.

In 2017, Reucassel embarked on a significant environmental initiative with the four-part ABC TV series War on Waste. This program shed light on Australia's alarming rates of clothing and food waste, highlighting their environmental consequences and advocating for sustainable solutions.

Following the success of War on Waste, Reucassel continued his environmental advocacy with the 2018 series Fight For Planet A: Our Climate Challenge. This series focused on the detrimental impact of single-use plastics, such as straws, on the environment, urging viewers to adopt eco-friendly practices.

In 2019, he began acting as one of the hosts of The Drum on ABC TV.

Reucassel ventured into directing with the two-part ABC TV series Big Deal in 2021. This investigative program, hosted by actor Christiaan Van Vuuren, explored the influence of lobbying and donations on Australia's political landscape.

== Other work ==
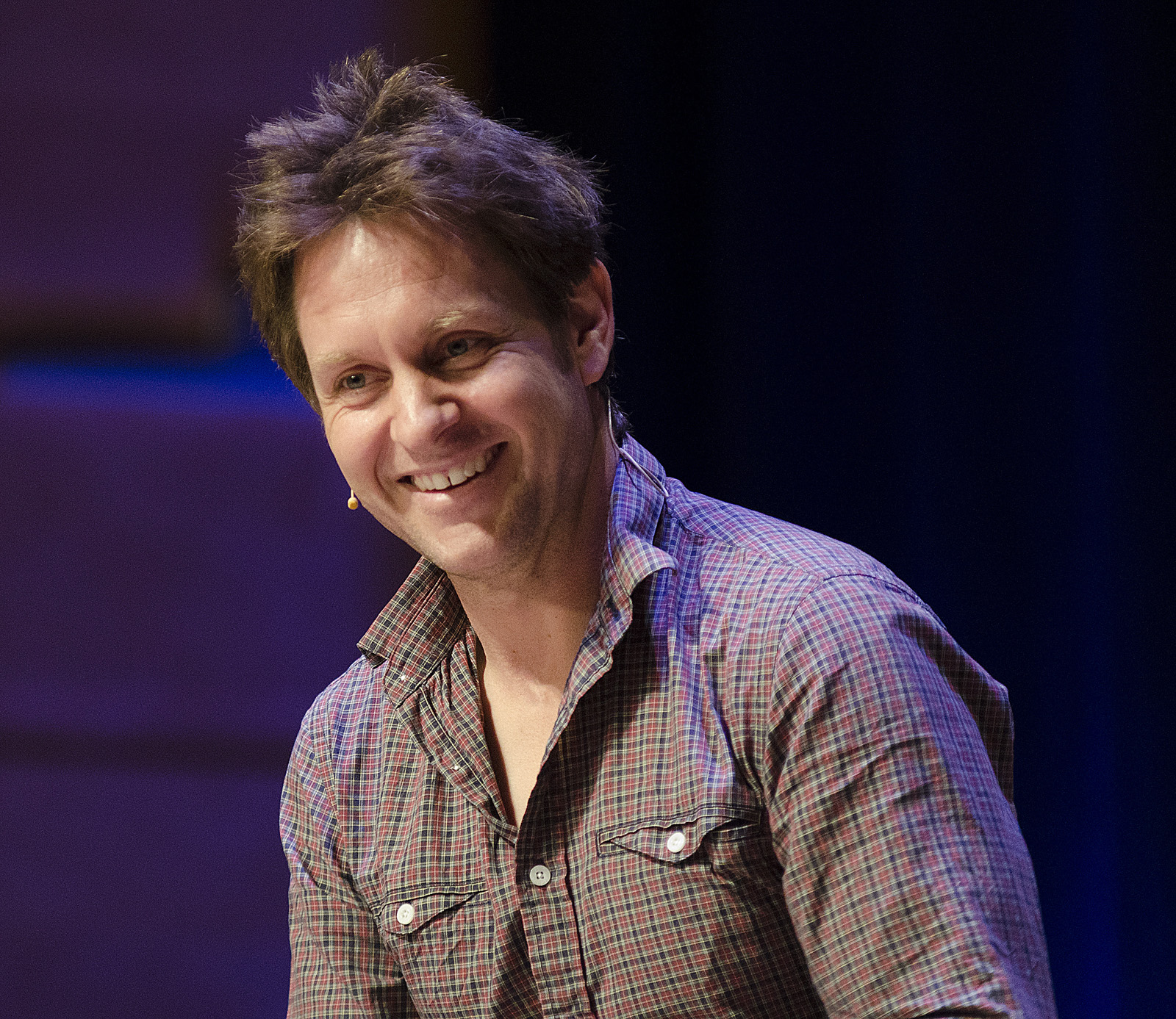
Reucassel speaking at the 2017 Australian Skeptics convention.

In 2012, Reucassel was a patron of the Left Right Think-Tank, Australia's first independent and non-partisan youth think-tank.

Since 2024, Reucassel has been presenting Breakfast on ABC Radio Sydney.

== Television ==
- CNNN – (2002–2003)
- The Panel – (3 episodes) (2003, 04, 07)
- The Chaser's War on Everything - (2006–2009)
- Spy Shop – (1 episode) (2007)
- Good News Week – (3 episodes) (2008–10)
- Q&A – (3 episodes) (2008–11)
- Top Gear Australia – (1 episode) (2010)
- Balls of Steel Australia – (20 episodes – Host) (2011–2012)
- You Have Been Watching – (1 episode) (2011)
- The Joy of Sets – (1 episode) (2011)
- The Silic & Lee Show at the Logies: Red Carpet Special 2012 – (1 episode) (2012)
- The Checkout – (2013–2018)
- War on Waste – series (2017–2023)
- Fight for Planet A – series (2020)
- Big Weather (and how to survive it) – series (2020)
- Big Deal – two-part documentary series on the political lobbying industry (2021). Presented by Christiaan Van Vuuren, this was Reucassel's directorial debut.
