= Chris Taylor (comedian) =

Australian comedian, writer and radio host

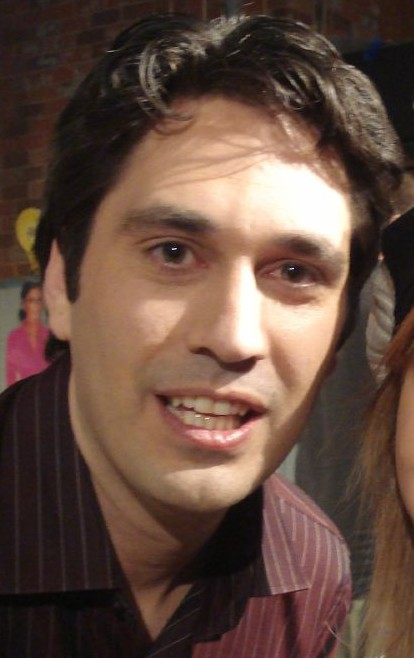
- Chris Taylor in 2007
- Born: Christopher Thornton Taylor; 15 July 1973 (age 53); Sydney, New South Wales, Australia
- Notable work: The Chaser

Comedy career
- Years active: 1999–present
- Medium: Radio, television, print and playwrighting
- Genre: Satirical comedy
- Website: chaser.com.au

Christopher Thornton Taylor (born 15 July 1973) is an Australian comedy writer, performer and broadcaster from Sydney. As a founding member of The Chaser, he is best known for co-writing and appearing on satirical ABC Television shows CNNNN (2002–2003) and The Chaser's War on Everything (2006 – July 2009). He formerly co-hosted the drive radio show Today Today (2004–05) on Triple J with fellow Chaser member Craig Reucassel, and in 2007, he wrote the musical comedy Dead Caesar. Taylor also hosted the mini documentary series 'Australia's Heritage: National Treasures'.

In 2010, with his Chaser colleague Andrew Hansen, Taylor made a musical comedy series for Triple J titled The Blow Parade, which became the number one podcast in the country, and won the 2010 ARIA Award for Best Comedy Release. In 2019, Taylor was the creator and co-writer of the drama Upright starring Tim Minchin.

== Early years ==
Taylor grew up on Sydney's Northern Beaches and North Shore and attended Shore School, North Sydney.

After completing secondary school, Taylor undertook an arts degree at the University of Sydney, and also studied play-writing at NIDA. But at 21 he abandoned play-writing and went back to university to study journalism at University of Technology, Sydney. In 1997, he moved to Melbourne after the ABC offered him a journalism cadetship there.

For five years, Taylor worked as an ABC journalist, including two years as a court reporter. He covered cases including the murder of toddler Jaidyn Leskie, the fatal Longford gas fire and the defamation action by the then Victorian premier Jeff Kennett against The Australian. Taylor then moved back to Sydney in 2001 to work full-time for The Chaser's newspaper, and ultimately became a Chaser member.

Taylor is also a cricketer and plays in an amateur team "The Mighty Ducks" with Julian Morrow and Charles Firth.

== CNNNN ==
In 2001, Andrew Denton got hold of one of The Chaser's newspapers and gave them the opportunity to produce a television show, hence The Chaser team produced their first ABC Television program The Election Chaser, which covered the 2001 Australian federal election. They then went on to create other television shows for ABC TV, including two series of the Logie Award-winning CNNNN in 2002–03 (in which Taylor portrayed a chief commentator), and The Chaser Decides in 2004, which covered the 2004 Australian federal election.

== Triple J ==
In addition to his roles on television, Taylor has teamed up with Chaser colleague Andrew Hansen to write and star in a musical comedy series, The Blow Parade, on Australian radio station Triple J from 14 April 2010 until 26 May 2010.

Taylor also united with fellow Chaser Craig Reucassel to present the Triple J drive slot, Today Today in 2004–2005.

As part of his role on Today Today, Taylor wrote and voiced a weekly Coma FM sketch, satirising the formats and style of commercial radio. He also co-hosted the radio program Bloody Sunday with Reucassel in 2006 and 2007. During the shows Taylor would regularly ask listeners to "go for broke" and vandalise Wikipedia pages. Tara Reid, Peter Overton and Wikipedia's own Wikipedia page were chosen targets. In 2008 Taylor and Reucassel returned to present The Race Race, covering the US presidential election.

Taylor also has the distinction of being Roy Slaven's official understudy at Triple J, broadcasting alongside HG Nelson on This Sporting Life and a Twenty20 cricket game on the couple of instances when Roy Slaven was absent.

In a notable instance while working at Triple J, Taylor agreed to streak across the grounds of the Sydney Big Day Out if the theme song from Media Watch polled in the 'Triple J Hottest 100' Countdown. It was announced that in terms of votes counted, the Media Watch theme had in fact come in at number 7, and Taylor proceeded to do his nude run in front of a large group of spectators.

== The Chaser's War on Everything ==
Taylor, who is often referred to as "Tayls" by his colleagues, is one of the main presenters on The Chaser's War on Everything. He is also the program's script editor and principal writer behind many of the show's segments, sketches and songs, some of which were controversial.

=== Appearance on Sunrise ===
In The Chaser's War on Everything skit "Will You Divorce Me?", Taylor made a guest appearance on Sunrise, a live morning talk show on Channel 7. He said he had an announcement for his wife and ended up yelling "Get the fuck out of my life" at the camera. The appearance of authenticity of this clip made it appear as though the segment went live to air on Sunrise, but it only ever appeared on The Chaser's War on Everything. When the segment became a viral video, Taylor and the hosts admitted it was staged on the Sunrise set after one of their shows though the latter said the dialogue was improvised and unaware of the profane punchline.

=== Tim Freedman parody ===
Taylor sparked controversy with Tim Freedman, singer and songwriter of indie rock band The Whitlams. On 7 October 2007, Freedman posted a message on the band's official website, citing a parody of him which was written by Taylor and had aired on the 3 October 2007 episode of The War. The song was performed by a fellow Chaser, Andrew Hansen, and the lyrics implied that Freedman was obsessed with the Sydney suburb of Newtown and that he continually referred to the area of Newtown in his own songs. In his message, Freedman said that the lyrics were indeed written by Taylor and that the parody had been motivated by jealousy over a woman they had both dated, Anna Skellern, who was a non-contributing cast member in the first season of CNNNN. Taylor denied this and said that the song had nothing to do with Skellern.

=== The Eulogy Song ===
On 17 October 2007 episode of The War, Andrew Hansen performed The Eulogy Song, a song written by Taylor which satirised the lives of several deceased celebrities, including Peter Brock, Princess Diana, Donald Bradman, Steve Irwin, Stan Zemanek, John Lennon, Jeff Buckley, and Kerry Packer. The song became controversial for its negative portrayal of prominent figures. Then Prime Minister of Australia, John Howard, and then Opposition Leader, Kevin Rudd, expressed negative views.

In response to the attention, Taylor defended the song, stating that it was a legitimate skit about the way the media airbrushes celebrities in death. He also revealed it was a "watered down" version of the song which was previously performed on stage in the musical Dead Caesar. The original had a verse about Rene Rivkin, but it was replaced with one about Stan Zemanek.

Andrew Hansen performed an updated version of The Eulogy Song in his 2020 national tour.

== Dead Caesar ==
As well as writing for The Chaser's War on Everything, Taylor wrote the play called Dead Caesar which premiered at the Sydney Theatre Company on 1 February 2007, and then had a one-month run in July 2007. The play was a musical comedy based on the life of Julius Caesar, featuring original music composed by Andrew Hansen, who also appeared in the play as Mark Antony and Lucius. The now infamous Eulogy Song was originally written for this production.

== Later career ==
Taylor has often been a stand-in host on ABC Radio Sydney when regular presenters have taken leave. This has included filling in for Chaser colleague Craig Reucassel in the breakfast slot.

== Discography ==
=== Albums ===
List of albums
Title	Album details
The Blow Parade (with Andrew Hansen and Craig Shuftan)	Released: April 2010; Label: Triple J, ABC (2740476); Formats: 2xCD, download

== Awards and notification ==
=== ARIA Music Awards ===
The ARIA Music Awards are a set of annual ceremonies presented by Australian Recording Industry Association (ARIA), which recognise excellence, innovation, and achievement across all genres of the music of Australia. They commenced in 1987.

Year	Nominee / work	Award	Result	Ref.
2010	The Blow Parade (with Andrew Hansen and Craig Shuftan)	Best Comedy Release	Won	
