= Chas Licciardello =

Australian comedian (born 1977)

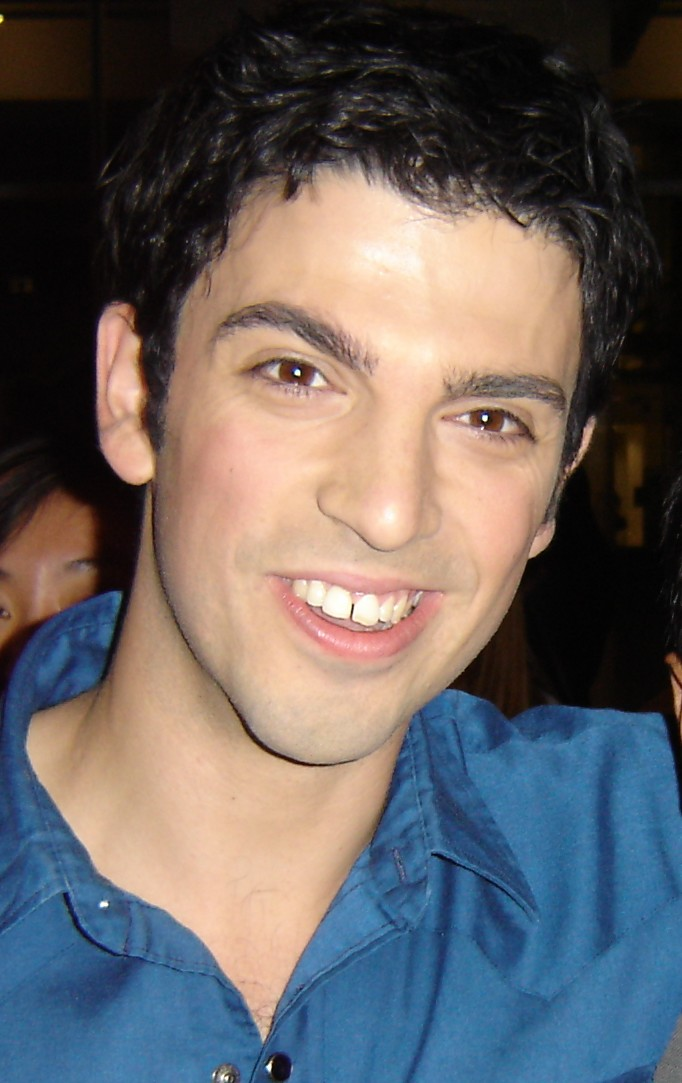
- Licciardello in 2007
- Born: Charles John Licciardello; 10 May 1977 (age 49); Australia
- Notable work: The Chaser (newspaper); The Chaser Decides (2001, 2004, 2007); CNNNN (2002–03); The Chaser's War on Everything (2006–09); The Chaser's Age of Terror Variety Hour (2008); Yes We Canberra! (2010); The Hamster Wheel (2011); The Hamster Decides (2013); The Chaser's Media Circus (2014, 2015); Planet America (2012, 2016–present)
- Spouse: Jocelyn Laurence

Comedy career
- Years active: 1999 – present
- Medium: Print, television, radio and stage
- Genres: Satirical comedy, TV presenter
- Website: chaser.com.au abc.net.au/tv.chaser.war

Charles John "Chas" Licciardello (born 10 May 1977) is an Australian comedian and member of satirical team The Chaser. He is currently the co-host, with John Barron, of Planet America on ABC TV and co-host of the P.E.P. "Planet Extra" Podcast. Licciardello has appeared as a regular of CNNNN, The Chaser's War on Everything and The Hamster Wheel.

== Early life ==
Chas attended Sydney Grammar School where he produced and edited The Tiger, a small satirical school magazine, with fellow Chaser writers Charles Firth and Dominic Knight. He graduated from the University of Sydney with a Bachelor of Laws and a Bachelor of Science majoring in physics and computer science.

== Television career ==
=== The Chaser ===
Licciardello is a member of the comedy crew, The Chaser. His television career began in 2001, when he appeared on The Chaser Decides. This show satirised the then-upcoming Australian federal election. He also appeared in two spin-off series, for the subsequent federal elections in 2004 and 2007.

He then appeared on the Chaser's CNNNN program, for two seasons, airing in 2002 and 2003.

Licciardello appeared as part of The Chaser team in 2006. He appeared on The Chaser's War on Everything, for three seasons, airing in 2006, 2007 and 2009.

In 2010, he appeared on Yes We Canberra!. In 2011 and 2012, he also appeared on The Hamster Wheel.

=== Planet America ===
In 2012, Licciardello co-hosted Planet America on ABC News with John Barron, covering the US election of that year. In early 2016 Licciardello resumed his hosting duties of Planet America, in the lead up to the 2016 U.S. presidential and congressional elections in November 2016.

In 2020, Planet America was moved to the primetime slot of 9.30 pm on Wednesday evenings on the primary ABC TV channel, to cover the 2020 US election campaign.

=== Planet Extra Podcast ===
Licciardello also presents the "P.E.P." podcast, self described at the beginning of each episode as "P.E.P. or Planet Extra Podcast. It is an offshoot of Planet America on ABC Australia which you can see at Wednesdays at 9:30 pm on ABC TV and 8:00 pm on Fridays on ABC News or anytime you like on iView or Facebook at ABC Planet America or on YouTube on the ABC News In-Depth Channel. On PEP we cover all the stuff that's too nerdy for TV, if you're listening to us you can also find PEP on YouTube and Facebook where you will find timestamps and show-notes in the blurb".

P.E.P. is typically co-hosted with Dr David Smith, an associate professor at the United States Studies Centre at the University of Sydney. Other regular guests on the show include Bill Wyman, Melina Wicks and Elle Hardy.

== Controversy ==
=== Bulldogs 2006 ===
On 14 July 2006, Licciardello attended a National Rugby League football match between the Canterbury Bulldogs and the St George Illawarra Dragons as part of a stunt for The Chaser's War on Everything that was meant to satirise the then-recent violent actions of Bulldogs fans. Dressed in a Bulldogs' jersey and beanie, he attempted to sell a "Bulldogs supporters' kit" containing fake knives, knuckle-dusters', and balaclavas in the team's colours. Licciardello was arrested by New South Wales Police and charged with offensive conduct. Licciardello explained that the skit "poked fun at the misbehaviour of Bulldogs fans" knowing that "a lot of people thought it was funny."

Licciardello was quick to dispute his charges on the show. The following Friday, he appeared on The Chaser's War on Everything in a cage before referring to the NSW Premier Morris Iemma's own joke regarding residents of crime-riddled suburbs wearing balaclavas. Iemma had described the Bulldogs stunt as "grossly irresponsible behaviour."

On 29 August 2006, in Kogarah Local Court, Licciardello pleaded not guilty to the charge. The matter was adjourned until 12 October. On 22 January 2007, magistrate Joanne Keogh said she would view an unedited video of the incident, totalling 50 minutes, to decide Licciardello's fate. Licciardello gave no evidence in the matter, letting The Chaser team's film speak for him. He was subsequently found not guilty as the magistrate found that "while his behaviour could be perceived as silly conduct, it was not offensive."

The decision was hailed a "victory for free speech". Licciardello was in the best of humour after the decision, and was reported as saying he would "appeal to the Supreme Court, the High Court, to the UN, the Jedi High Council and the Snickometer" before being reminded he had won the case."

=== APEC 2007 ===
One of the most controversial stunts in which Licciardello was involved was the APEC stunt in 2007. Fellow Chaser Julian Morrow claimed that he and Licciardello aimed to get a majority of their members arrested amid the high security surrounding the APEC Australia 2007 summit in Sydney, adding jokingly that they also aimed to get Licciardello shot.

Footage aired on The Chaser's War on Everything on 12 September 2007 showed the fake "motorcade" consisting of two SUVs, a black Holden limousine flying a Canadian flag on the bonnet, four "runners" (one of whom was Morrow) carrying hand-held video cameras and two motorcycles. They passed through two security checkpoints without being stopped by police or asked for identification; at one point, the footage showed Morrow offering to present identification to a police officer, however he was waved through without this occurring. The motorcade reached a point ten metres outside the hotel where U.S. President George W. Bush was staying. Police only realised that the motorcade was a hoax when Licciardello, dressed as Osama bin Laden, voluntarily stepped out of the limousine.

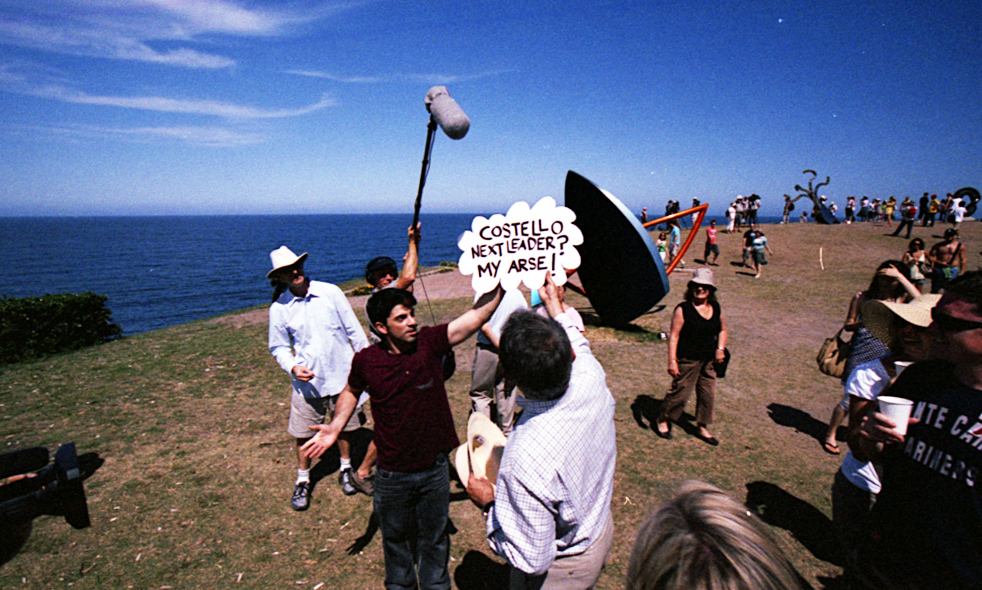
Licciadello holds a "thought bubble" over Malcolm Turnbull's head, satirising what politicians are really thinking. Pictured on 18 November 2007.

Following the incident, Licciardello and Morrow were detained and questioned by NSW Police on 6 September 2007 outside the InterContinental Hotel, and were charged under the APEC Meeting (Police Powers) Act 2007. The charges were dropped in April 2008. They were dropped because his lawyers stated that he was waved through the blockades and he had to do what the police said.

== Other works ==
During the Chaser recess, Licciardello appeared on the panel of My Favourite Album, an ABC TV special showcasing Australia's top ten albums as voted by the public. He also filled in on Triple M's drive time slot during the summer of 2007 with fellow Chaser colleague Dominic Knight with their show Chas and Dom from 'The Chaser'.

On 25 May 2008 Licciardello and Craig Reucassel were guests on channel Ten's Rove. Their interview concluded with the '20 Bucks in 20 Seconds' segment. When Rove McManus asked the only question that is asked to every guest, "Who would you turn gay for?", Chas responded in annoyance that everyone answered "I'd turn gay for you, Rove" but that nobody ever followed up on it. He then leapt on Rove and French kissed him, before licking Rove on the face.

In 2009, for a stunt featured in the series finale of The Chaser's War on Everything, he received heavy dosage's of botox, lip injections and spray tanning on the left side of his body so as to bear a similarity to Daniel Craig. The amount of botox was so heavy that it lasted until he made his appearance on The 7pm Project, over three months after the botox was injected into the right side of his face.

== Personal life ==
He is married to Dr Jocelyn Laurence, formerly a research analyst at Foster Stockbroking, and they have two daughters. In 2007, he lived in Croydon Park, in the inner west of Sydney.

Chas is also a supporter of the Western Bulldogs Football Club in the Australian Football League. Despite growing up in New South Wales, which is predominantly rugby league heartland, Licciardello decided to follow the AFL as it "annoyed his father".
