= Julian Morrow =

Australian comedian (born 1975)

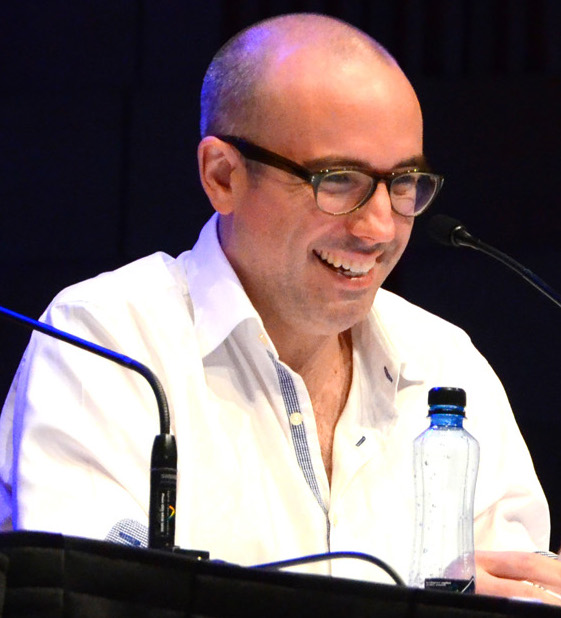
- Morrow at Australian Skeptics National Convention 2014
- Born: Julian Francis Xavier Morrow; 1975 (age 50–51)
- Notable work: The Chaser; The Chaser Decides (2001, 2004, 2007); CNNNN (2002–2003); The Chaser's War on Everything (2006–2007, 2009); The Chaser's Age of Terror Variety Hour (2008); Yes We Canberra! (2010); The Checkout (2013); The Hamster Decides (2013)
- Spouse: Lisa Pryor
- Children: 2

Comedy career
- Years active: 1999–present
- Medium: Television, radio, print and stage
- Genre: Satirical Comedy
- Website: http://www.chaser.com.au

Julian Francis Xavier Morrow (born 1975) is an Australian comedian and television producer from Sydney. He is best known for being a member of the satirical team The Chaser. As a member of The Chaser, he has appeared on several ABC Television programs including CNNNN (2002–03), The Chaser's War on Everything (2006–07, 2009) and The Checkout (2013–2018), of which he was also executive producer.

== Personal life ==
Educated at St Aloysius' College in Sydney, Morrow is the son of Melvyn Morrow, a playwright and English teacher at Saint Ignatius' College, Riverview, who has written for musicals including "Shout! The Legend of the Wild One", and "Dusty – The Original Pop Diva". Before becoming a comedian, Morrow graduated in law at University of Sydney. He then worked as an industrial relations lawyer for the law firm Blake Dawson Waldron, now Ashurst Australia. Morrow is married to the Sydney Morning Herald columnist and former opinion page editor Lisa Pryor. The couple have two children. He claims to be a lapsed Catholic.

Morrow is also a cricketer and plays in an amateur team "The Mighty Ducks" with Chris Taylor and Charles Firth.

== The Chaser ==
Morrow first became known in the Chaser production CNNNN, in which he portrayed the Washington correspondent, always appearing on a plasma screen behind the main news anchors. He has been a regular on The Chaser's War on Everything since the pilot episode. His main field assignments include "Pursuit Trivia", where he poses random Trivial Pursuit questions at press conferences, and as the "Citizens' Infringement Officer".

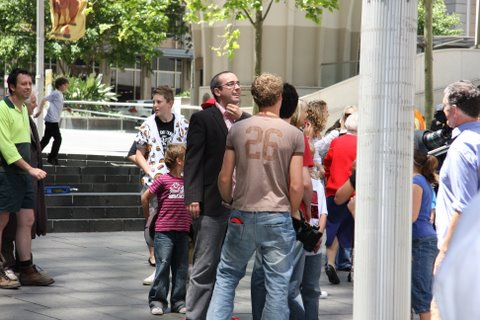
Morrow during a stunt which performed a "If life were a musical" segment in late 2007

In the latter role, Morrow, while impersonating a parking inspector, hands out fines to unsuspecting passers-by identified as a nuisance to society. These menaces include parking inspectors themselves, people with annoying mobile phone ringtones, parents who give their children bad names, people with personalised "wanker" number plates, people over-proud of their tattoos, people who wear cheesy T-shirts with silly messages and people who wear their pants too low.

Another Morrow segment is "Open Mic", in which he uses the public address system of a shopping centre, grocery store or pokies club to deliver a 'community service' announcement such as 'Please go home' or 'Can we please have a minute's silence?'.

In November 2006, Morrow filled in as presenter on 702 ABC Sydney for the Breakfast and Evenings programs. He also presented the Breakfast Show on 702 for the 2008 Australia Day Public Holiday.

In November 2009, Morrow was the lecturer for the 2009 Andrew Olle Media Lecture, speaking on offensive items in the media.

In 2013, Morrow and fellow Chaser Craig Reucassel began hosting the consumer affairs series The Checkout. The first series began airing on ABC1 on 21 March 2013, and its second series commenced on 20 February 2014.

=== APEC 2007 ===
A controversial stunt involving Morrow and the Chaser team was the fake motorcade during the APEC Australia 2007 summit in Sydney. Despite high security, the team managed to get two SUVs, a black limousine flying the Canadian flag, four "runners" (one of whom was Morrow) carrying hand-held video cameras, and two motorcycles past two security checkpoints without being stopped by police or asked for identification.

At one point, the footage showed Morrow offering to present identification to a police officer. He was waved through. The motorcade got within 10 metres of the hotel where then United States President George W. Bush was staying. Police only realised the motorcade was a hoax when Chas Licciardello, dressed as Osama bin Laden, stepped out of the limousine.

After the incident, Licciardello and Morrow were detained and questioned by New South Wales Police on 6 September 2007 outside the InterContinental Hotel, and were charged under the APEC Meeting (Police Powers) Act 2007. The charges were dropped in April 2008.

== Sunday Extra ==
Despite Morrow's reputation as a comedian, for the last few years, he has hosted the mainly serious topical program Sunday Extra on ABC's Radio National. The program includes a segment called "The Year That Made Me", where people tell of a significant year that changed the course of their lives.
