= The Chaser (newspaper) =

Australian satirical newspaper

- The Chaser logo
- Type: Satirical paper
- Owner: The Chaser
- Editor: Various
- Founded: 1999 (original print); 2015–present (reboot of print); 2005–present (online)
- Ceased publication: 2005 (original print)
- Headquarters: Surry Hills
- Circulation: Quarterly (originally fortnightly)
- Website: www.chaser.com.au

The Chaser is a quarterly (originally fortnightly) satirical newspaper, published in Australia from 1999 to 2005. The masthead continued as a digital publication from 2005, as well as a short-lived app for the Apple iPad in 2010, before resuming print publication as a quarterly journal in 2015. The paper is best known for lending its name to the Australian comedy troupe The Chaser, made up of former contributors to the paper, who have gone on to produce a wide range of media under the Chaser brand.

== History ==
The newspaper was first published on 9 May 1999, and quickly made a name for the Chaser team as cutting edge satirists. In particular, the publication gained notoriety after publishing Australian Prime Minister John Howard's private, unlisted home phone number on their front page, prompting readers to phone him with any grievances they had about the government's policies. The writers later claimed that the phone number was sent to them via an anonymous SMS and it was only later published in response to John Howard ignoring anti-war protests. Before this time The Chaser had a limited fan base, but the popularity of the paper was greatly increased as a result of being shown as a lead story in all major Australian news broadcasts.

Another notable stunt by The Chaser newspaper involved the award ceremony for Australian television, the Logies. The top award presented – the Gold Logie – is decided by a popular vote. Due to the small level of voting (restricted only to readers of the magazine TV Week), the Chaser team encouraged all their readers to vote for little known SBS news reader Anton Enus for the award, and only narrowly missed out on achieving the required number of votes.

== Move away from print ==
In 2005, production of the paper was wound down due to lack of profitability, as well as to ease the demands on the writers who had become involved with other projects, including the Chaser's various media ventures. Although the final run of the original paper was published in February 2005, the masthead and stories continued to be updated online via the Chaser website and a short-lived iPad app. These stories were also featured in a number of annual print publications released at the end of the year.

In 2015 the Australian National Archives undertook a project to digitize the entire print run of the Chaser newspaper, in recognition of its importance in the Australian media and political landscape. As a result, copies of the paper are now available online for free via Trove, the National Archive's digital resource.

== Return to print ==
In 2015 the Chaser successfully crowd-sourced over $50,000 to re-launch the paper as a glossy journal, published four times a year. This publication is titled "The Chaser Quarterly" and has retained many of the original writers, as well as including new contributors from the Chaser's TV and radio shows.

In June 2022, the Chaser, in collaboration with the National Art School released a one-off issue of the Chaser newspaper, composed entirely of new material.
