= List of The Chaser's War on Everything episodes =

The Chaser's War on Everything is an Australian television satirical comedy series broadcast by the Australian Broadcasting Corporation (ABC). The cast perform sketches mocking social and political issues, and often feature comedic publicity stunts. The series is produced by The Chaser, an Australian satirical group consisting of Chris Taylor, Julian Morrow, Craig Reucassel, Andrew Hansen, and Chas Licciardello. The show premiered in 2006 and the last episode of the series was aired on 29 July 2009, and rated an average national audience of 1.45 million. It ran for 58 episodes.

== Series overview ==
Series	Episodes	Originally aired	DVD release dates
Series	Episodes	Originally aired	Region 4
1	26	2006	Part 1:1 August 2006; Part 2: 1 November 2006
2	24	2007	Part 1: 14 August 2007; Part 2: 7 August 2008
3	8	2009	15 November 2009

== Series 1 (2006) ==
Original Air Date	TV Broadcast	Synopsis	#
17 February 2006	S01E01	Intro joke; Special Guest Corpse: Kerry Packer; Stunt; Kerry Packer, pull memorial off the air.; Stunt; Kerry Packer Memorial Fund.; Ad/Trailer; Mega Cheese Crust Pizza.; Pursuit Trivia; Stephen Smith - What is the World's second largest mountain? (incorrect) (K2).; Surprise Spruiker; Giorgio Armani, Department of Employment and Workplace Relations and Department of Immigration and Citizenship.; Subtitle; A Message From Osama bin Laden.; Stunt; Meat at The Big Day Out.; This Week's Subliminal Message: "Pausing to read this Subliminal message probably isn't worth the effort, don't you agree?"; Ad/Trailer; The Road To Turin.; Firth in the USA; Super Bowl.; In Other News...; Australian Wheat Board kickback scandal, Abortion Drug, Eddie McGuire, British Soldiers Bashing Iraqis and Bali 9.; Ad/Trailer; Evade Aid.; What Have We Learned From Current Affairs This Week?; Lesson 1: Dodgy Guys.; Mr. Ten Questions; Hugh Jackman.	1
Comments			
24 February 2006	S01E02	Intro joke; Special Guest Scientologist: Tom Cruise; Stunt; Promoting Today on Sunrise.; Subtitle; Another Saddam Outburst; Surprise Spruiker; Australian Wheat Board.; Ads/Trailer; The Biggest Loser, Kim Beazley.; Stunt; Preferred Prime Minister Kim Beazley or..., Steve Vizard, David Hicks, Ivan Milat, Adolf Hitler, Plank of wood and Steaming turd.; Famous Face Off; News reading, Richard Morecroft (11 mistakes) and Jacinta Tynan (17 mistakes).; Stunt; Bonehead live cross (19.02 seconds).; Firth in the USA; Guns.; What Have We Learned From Current Affairs This Week?; Lesson 2: Experts. (Experts at bookshelves, Experts who use mouses, Experts who walk up to secretary, talk and exchange files, Experts who flip pages and experts who walk).; Mr. Ten Questions; Charlize Theron.; In Other News: Bill Clinton, AWB, Asian bird flu, Ian Thorpe, Ben Cousins and Tony Abbott.; Ad/Trailer; Tropfest (Busting).; Song; Musical note.	2
Comments	The dog's name was Sunny.		
3 March 2006	S01E03	Ad/Trailer; Rug Emporium Part 1.; Intro Joke; Special Guest Star, Dan Brown.; Stunt; John Howard Anniversary Present, Heart.; Stunt; Where The Bloody Hell Are You? ('So, Get Your Fucking Arse Over Here', 'Don't be a Prick, Visit Australia', Australia's Shit-Hot, So get Your Dickhead Arse The Fuck Down Here', 'Australia, 'It Shits All Over Everywhere else', '(Dear sir) Fuck Australia's Fucking Great So Why The Fuck Aren't You Here Mother Fucker' 'Australia, It's Free Of Fuckwits' and 'View this Beautiful Landscape, You Arsehole/View this Fucking Beautiful Landscape'); Ad/Trailer; John Howard.; Subtitle; A Message From Osama Bin Laden.; Pursuit Trivia; Backstreet Boys - What is the capital of Australia? (incorrect) (Canberra); Stunt; Mosque in Mosman.; Ad/Trailer; Rug Emporium Part 2.; Firth in the USA; Cool.; Ad/Trailer; Commonwealth Bank.; In Other News..; Radical Muslims, Tony Abbott, AWB (stunt; Ringing Trevor Flugge), Channel Nine logo, David Beckham, Bob Carr (Stunt; Bob Carr interview) and Brokeback Mountain (Ad/Trailer; Brokeback Mountain Christian Edition).; Ad/Trailer; The Complete Walks of John Howard.; What Have We Learned From Current Affairs This Week?; Lesson 3: Visualisations.; Scenes From The Life of the Crazy Warehouse Clearance Guy; McDonald's.; Ad/Trailer; Rug Emporium Part 3.	3
Comments			
10 March 2006	S01E04	Intro Joke; Special Guest Host, Jon Stewart.; Recliner Gag; Sally Robbins laying down; Stunt; Commonwealth Games tickets - Craig trying to sell tickets to less popular sports by paying people rather than them paying for tickets.; Ad/Trailer; 2006 Commonwealth Games - "share the one-sided dream" (mocking the lack of competitive nations involved).; Mr Ten. Questions - Backstreet Boys, Only asking two questions.; Stunt; Julian proposing to Attorney-General Phillip Ruddock, a reference to an incident involving Ruddock and Chas Licciardello previously seen on The Election Chaser. Chas then appears in a wedding dress.; Ad/Trailer; The Has Beens; Surprise Spruiker; Nine Network.; Stunt; Chas proposing a memorial for Cronulla in commemoration of the 2005 Cronulla riots; In Other News; Simon Crean winning a by-election, celebrations speech involving the phrase "We shat it in", stunt; Simon Crean and the Crean Diaries (reference to The Latham Diaries).; Sketch; In-studio call to new Howard Government "Pregnancy Advice Line".; Interview with Andrew posing as Heath Ledger in lieu of the controversial movie Brokeback Mountain.; Pursuit Trivia: Tony Abbott - What happened on the day Mark Twain was born and also the day he died? (incorrect) (Halley's Comet appeared); Firth in the USA: Christian Theme Park, The Holy Land Experience.; Current Affairs Oscars; presented by Chas & Andrew, mocking Current Affairs as the regular sketch would.; Stunt; Royal visit - Craig attempting to find accommodation for the royal family "on the cheap".; Closing Credits; The Has Beens performance.	4
Comments			
17 March 2006	S01E05	Intro Joke; Special Guest Corpse, Slobodan Milosevic.; Ongoing gag throughout show; Chris objecting to the show Everybody Hates Chris.; Stunt; Everybody Hates Chris - Chris attempting to have the show name changed at Network Ten headquarters.; Stunt; Commonwealth Games - citizens billeting "shunted" homeless people from the streets of Melbourne.; Ad/Trailer; American smoking gag - political story.; Stunt; "Are you dead?" - Chas checking up on people if they are dead - a social commentary on people dying alone in their homes.; Scenes From The Life of the Crazy Warehouse Clearance Guy; Library.; Song; I Want to Be a Stand Up Scottish Comedian - Andrew mimicking Billy Connolly; Sketch; The Road to Melbourne - Chris & Andrew in Synchronised Swimming.; Straight to DVD; Lleyton Hewitt: The Other Side; Mr Ten Questions; Kerri-Anne Kennerley; Ad/Trailer; Twenty20 Lawn Bowls; In Other News; Prime Minister John Howard ruling out allowing the ABC to go commercial - the Chaser team then proceeds to consume McDonald's and sing commercial jingles.; Kim Beazley's verbosity - Julian using gibberish to question Beazley, who in turn threatens him.; Anarchist Cookbook.; 2006 Commonwealth Games - Chris reporting until "I Hate Chris" appears on the backdrop behind him.; Tourism ad mocking the Royal visit - "Why the hell are you here?"; Craig attempting to ask the Queen to sack Howard, or Beazley at least.; Ad Road-Test; Big M milk - "What is Love?". Concludes segment and episode with audience member holding up "I Hate Chris" sign as Chris leads the group trying to serenade her.	5
Comments			
24 March 2006	S01E06	Intro Joke; New Owner of the Show: Russell Crowe - reference to his purchase of NRL team the South Sydney Rabbitohs.; Picture-in-Picture gag; Letter of complaint sees them play an episode of Mother and Son in a "picture-in-picture" setup.; Stunt; Childcare options - Craig puts his child on the following for the day: Ferris Wheel; Public Bus; Lost Property at Railway Station; Cloak Room; Stunt ends with Craig forgetting his child, who remains on a bus.: Ad/Trailer; "Wankster" ringtones - parodying Jamster ringtone subscriptions; Surprise Spruiker; South Sydney Rabbitohs.; Stunt; Julian taking portraits to Machiavelli's restaurant of political and business figures recently involved in scandals.; Ad/Trailer; Alexander Downer joke, comedians denouncing Downer for it - "The Adelaide Aristocrats".; Stunt; Open Mic comedy night - Virgin Blue humour, or lack thereof. David Koch - the King of Comedy.; Famous Face-Off: Steve Fielding (Family First Party) vs. Barnaby Joyce (National Party of Australia) - Penalty shootout (football).; Ad/Trailer; U2 - Adam Clayton solo tour - "Clayton's Concert"; In Other News; Cyclone Larry - news & weather coverage.; Kim Beazley follow up from the previous week - offering Beazley to kneecap him with a baseball bat.; Australian Wheat Board kickbacks - Alexander Downer's signature.; Australian football player Wayne Carey's affair.; The Wiggles "Where's Jeff" parody song - mocking the inherence of drugs in the entertainment industry.; Ad/Trailer; ABC program Catalyst - blue bottles beaching themselves.; Firth in the USA: Obesity - "The Fattest Country on Earth".; What Have We Learned From Current Affairs This Week?; Plastic bag winner from Episode 4 Awards appearing again on A Current Affair; Lesson 4: Graphics, particularly "Stamps".; Stunt; Chas & Andrew putting a "Too Many Stamps" stamp on the Channel 7 building.; Closing Commentary; celebrating the third anniversary of the war on Iraq (exploding cake); Closing Credits; Mother & Son.	6
Comments			
31 March 2006	S01E07	Intro Joke; Special Guest Star: That Fucking Duck.; Opening dialogue gag: Chaser Team dismissed due to the Howard Government's controversial Industrial Relations (IR) laws.; Stunt; French protest methods in response to the new IR laws.; Sketch; Family members replacing skilled workers.; Pursuit Trivia; Malcolm Turnbull - Io is a moon outside of which gaseous planet? (incorrect) (Jupiter).; Scenes from the Life of the Crazy Warehouse Guy; Cinema Box Office.; Stunt; Cyclone names going commercial, including visits to the National Australia Bank, Telstra, Australian Wheat Board, the Australian Labor Party and the Commonwealth Bank.; Ad/Trailer; ABC ad - criticism of the current advertisement being pretentious, incomprehensible and obscure.; Ad Road-Test; The NapiSan Challenge; Stunt; Chris offering cracked pepper to random people in various situation.; Pursuit Trivia; Malcolm Turnbull - Who won the 2002 Melbourne Cup? (incorrect) (Media Puzzle).; In Other News; IR laws (Chris offers cracked pepper early in the segment) - Julian "sacking" Workplace Minister Kevin Andrews; Obscene cartoon of John Howard and Alexander Downer.; Alexander Downer in song, 2005.; Ratings trouble for Vega 95.3FM in Sydney. Stunt; Bringing a small crowd posing as the entire listening audience to Vega's studios.; Segue to Firth in the USA; Secret Societies; Ad/Trailer; Celebrity Solitaire (parody of Poker becoming a televised game); Stunt; Chas and statue buskers on Sydney's Circular Quay. Ends with Chas being carried from the studio and replaced with a statue.; Closing Credits; Hansen singing "The Credits Song", resulting in a three-way split screen akin to how commercial networks advertise upcoming shows.	7
Comments			
7 April 2006	S01E08	Stunt; Macquarie Bank tolls; Subtitle; A Message From Osama bin Laden; Surprise Spruiker; Uranium sale - Commonwealth Department of Resources; Discount Sensis service - Chas calls a phone sex line, a psychic hotline, and a random person in America in order to get business phone numbers.; Firth in the USA; Charles gets thrown out of more corporate headquarters than Michael Moore.; The Chaser's British Comedy Sketch - performed in the style of Monty Python.; Mr. Ten Questions; Peter Carey; What Have We Learned From Current Affairs This Week?; Lesson 5: Interviews; Ad/Trailer; When a Telemarketer Calls; In Other News; Condoleezza Rice and Jack Straw visiting Baghdad; Abuse of IR laws; Death of Pro Hart; Ben Lee getting hit in the head by a bottle; Stunt; Door Bouncer Challenge - Chris tests how inappropriately he can dress and still be let into a nightclub if he has girls with him - Normal outfit: Entry granted, Pygamas: Entry granted, KKK costume: Entry granted, Underwear: Entry not granted; Andrew Hansen's Closing Comment; "Please note that we are all atheists but we're also hypocrites and we'll be taking the next three weeks off to celebrate Easter."	8
Comments			
28 April 2006	S01E09	Stunt; Replacing Don Bradman with Jason Gillespie; Song; All My Clothes Are Pink - Parody of The White Stripes; Stunt; Free Gullibility Test; Ad/Trailer; The Queen by Christo; Stunt; Chas achieves the world's shortest cab fare (less than 10 metres); Scenes from the Life of the Crazy Warehouse Guy; Asking for directions; Famous Face Off; Actors - Deborah Mailman (156 words) and Pia Miranda (163 words); In Other News; Asylum seekers; Prince Harry serving as a soldier in Iraq; Michelle Leslie; The new Big Brother series; Nikki Webster on the cover of Zoo Magazine; Ad/Trailer; Appearing in Government Ads, Australia Says No; What Have We Learned From Current Affairs This Week?; Current Affairs Tallyboard; Lesson 6: Cross Promotions; Stunt; Chris divorcing his wife Jo on Sunrise; Closing Credits; In Ukrainian	9
Comments			
5 May 2006	S01E10	Stunt; Australian Fashion Week food drop; Subtitle; A Message From Osama bin Laden; Surprise Spruiker; Medibank Private; Stunt; Julian shows up at a book store to sign other people's books, as well as Peter Carey and Kathy Lette's book signings.; Famous Face Off; Sportscasters - Les Murray (11 mistakes) and Peter Wilkins (112 mistakes according to Andrew); Ad/Trailer; Nike sweatshops "Just sew it"; Song; Comedy Songs on TV; Stunt; Craig attempts to hand out $5 and $50 notes as if they were flyers.; Ad/Trailer; American Baguette; Ad/Trailer; Burst Dirt Shots; In Other News; Interest rate rise; Beaconsfield Mine collapse; Private Jake Kovco; The Logie Awards; Shane Warne; Australian Fashion Week; Stunt; Islamic wear at Australian Fashion Week; Ad/Trailer; Municipal Cemeteries of Australia; Pursuit Trivia; Kevin Rudd - Who defeated Napoleon at Waterloo? (correct, although Rudd gave a different answer) (Duke of Wellington); Closing Credits; Scene from American Baguette	10
Comments			
12 May 2006	S01E11	Intro Joke; Occupational Health and Safety Advice; Amount we've offered the miners for their story: $4; Stunt; Naomi's Make-up Truck; Stunt; Chas' Logies Bonehead Challenge (goal: 20 total: 34); Stunt; Door to door spam; Mr. Ten Questions; The Sydney Swans; Stunt; Oversized games; Subtitle; A Message From Osama bin Laden; Stunt; Chas calls Stan Zemanek's talkback radio show pretending to be an unemployed clinically depressed person. He is called, among other things, a "low-life" and an "oxygen thief", and told his mother is a prostitute.; Ad/Trailer; Stan Zemanek Lifeline; Firth in the USA; Freedom; In Other News; Beaconsfield Mine collapse, interview with "Todd Russell" (Chris Taylor) and "Brant Webb" (Andrew Hansen); Paul McCartney and Heather Mills' separation; The budget; Stunt; Custom flagpoles for MPs; Surprise Spruiker; Logies; Ad Road Test; Oral-B; Closing Credits; Footage of the Beaconsfield miners emerging from mine played over and over	11
Comments	The beach towel Charles Firth presented to one of the Americans during his stunt ended up being stolen by a woman, the footage of which was included as a DVD extra.		
19 May 2006	S01E12	Stunt; Craig gives new helicopters to the Royal Australian Navy.; Pursuit Trivia; Shannon Noll - What is the chemical symbol for sodium? (correct) (Na); Stunt; Antisocial iPod listeners; Scenes From the Life of the Crazy Warehouse Guy; Car breakdown; Ad/Trailer; Instant Sophistication Kit; Stunt; Pre-tween market; Stunt; Traditional Italian massage; In Other News; Jake Kovco; Todd Russell and Brant Webb signing a deal with Channel Nine; BBC apology; John Hopoate; The UN's Oil for Food program; Stunt; Attempting to buy petrol with various food items; Ad/Trailer; ABBA tribute band; What Have We Learned From Current Affairs This Week?; Lesson 7: Comedy; Stunt; Taking an "old person screwed over" for a Today Tonight interview; Ad Road Test; Lynx Deodorant; Credits; The Chaser's Warfalcon	12
Comments			
26 May 2006	S01E13	Intro Joke; The Chaser's Makeup By: Tracy Grimshaw; Stunt; Woolworth's pokies.; The Surprise Spruiker; Kirribilli House; Ad/Trailer; Channel Nine, journalistic prostitution.; Citizens' Infringement Officer; Parking Inspectors.; Song; Hill$ong.; Ad/Trailer; Australian's Brainiest non-Asian kid, dentist, dwarf, shop mannequin, pigeon, gorilla gram, actuary, root vegetable, penis, corpse, nobody, brain, cat, alcoholic beverage, mobile phone, computer, skeleton, fruit, toast, leaf, lunch, doll, office utensil, gardening tool, toy bear, brass instrument, bookshelf, shoe, subliminal message, shape, card, giraffe, butterfly, spider, rhinoceros beetle, fly, plane, crab, cow, dog, bike, ship, house, water tank, flying fish, sheep, whale, shrimp, shark, dinosaur, octopus, fruit, toast, leaf, lunch, doll, office utensil, tool, toy bear, brass instrument, bookshelf, shoe, letter, shape, cupcake, giraffe, butterfly, spider, rhinoceros beetle, fly, naked person, crab, cow, dog, bike, ship, house, water tank, flying fish, sheep, whale, shrimp, shark, dinosaur, octopus, fruit, toast, leaf, lunch, doll, office utensil, person, toy bear, and brass instrument.; Ad/Trailer; Shit Boring Golf Classic.; Stunt; Magical healing.; Ad/Trailer; Pecs City Gym.; Stunt; Chris Taylor wearing a stocking on his head.; In Other News...; nuclear energy, Mark Latham book, health minister, ABC new boss (subliminal message: Gee Mark, I can't believe you're vain enough to pause this) and The Da Vinci Code.; Stunt; Church against Benchwarmers.; Pursuit Trivia; Philip Ruddock - What is Austin Powers' middle name?; What Have We Learned From Current Affairs This Week?; Chris Simond with magical powers; Lesson 8 Youth Gone Wild.; Stunt; The Da Vinci Code, NoD glasses and Surround Silence.; Credit Joke; And now for another subliminal message for the new ABC Managing Director, Please give us a better timeslot.	13
Comments			
2 June 2006	S01E14	Intro; More money for the ABC; Stunt; ABC nude calendar to raise money for the ABC; Ad/Trailer; Air Bassoon documentary; Surprise Spruiker; Melbourne City Council; Stunt; Trying to find an Australian baby for Angelina Jolie to adopt; Message from Osama; Cannes; Stunt; Trying to get support for Janette Howard to run for PM; Ad/Trailer; backpackers; Ad Road Test; Nicorette- No Gary No; In Other News; Government's new IR laws, child care centre controversy, 1 billionth hotel bible; Firth in the USA; Gimp; What Have We Learned From Current Affairs This Week?; Lesson 9: The Big Issues; Breasts, Smile signs, Kim Beazley; Ad/Trailer; Goodnight Phillip Ruddock; Credits; Nicorette	14
Comments			
23 June 2006	S01E15	Intro; Security; Stunt; Terrorist/Tourist. Testing how long a tourist can film sensitive places and comparing it to a cliché terrorist doing the same thing.; Message From Abu Bakar Bashir; John Howard should convert to Islam; Scenes From The Life of The Crazy Warehouse Guy; Fruit stall; Stunt; ASIO job application; Faux Ad; Sugary Sugar Pops; Song; Keith Urban Song; Mr Ten Questions; Paul Keating; What Have We Learned From Current Affairs This Week?; Lesson 10: Overstatement; Australia's Worst.; Ad/Trailer; Providential Mutual; In Other News; ABC of Childcare, Nuclear Spill; Stunt; Chas as a Medieval Knight trying to get into a secured building; Credits; More Medieval Knight	15
Comments			
30 June 2006	S01E16	Intro Joke; Employer of the Week: Eddie McGuire.; Stunt; Using sign language to insult politicians; Ad/Trailer; Ken Done Code; Studio Piece; Spam Mailbag; Famous Face Off; Rockstars, Quan Yeomans (5 guitar strings broken) and Tim Rogers (1 broken).; Ad/Trailer; Spotlight working conditions clearance.; Firth in the USA; Fred Phelps and the Westboro Baptist Church.; In Other News; East Timor's new Prime Minister; Indonesia and Australia prisoner exchange deal; AWA protest; Stunt; Peter Costello AWA; Big Brother; Warren Buffett; The World Cup; Brad Cooper sentenced to jail; Stunt; Playing Brad Cooper his own audio tapes.; Ad Road Test; Telstra World Cup Fever; Credits; Fred Phelps sermon.	16
Comments			
7 July 2006	S01E17	Stunt; Pushers trying to save on fuel; Ad/Trailer; Are You Being Shagged?; Scenes from the life of the Crazy Warehouse Guy; Complaining about bus route numbers; Stunt; Chas travelling in taxi boot; Subtitle; Meanwhile, in Iran; Pursuit Trivia; Wilson Tuckey - How many bends are there in a standard paper clip? (incorrect) (three); Stunt; Acting inappropriate in smart cars; Stunt; Offering smart cars to people; Mr. Ten Questions; Naomi Wolf; In Other News; North Korea's Scud missiles; Jonestown; Leaked tape from Australian military; Anti-smoking laws; Channel Nine's new logo; Big Brother turkey slapping incident; Stunt; Turkey slapping survey featuring actual turkey; Ad/Trailer; Detective Superintendent Clive Pugh recites The Bard; What Have We Learned From Current Affairs This Week?; Re-enactments; Fight scene; Celebrity fluff; Abusive boss; Stunt; Media-scrum for minor court cases; Credits; Pushing ride-on lawnmower, tank and plane to save fuel	17
Comments			
14 July 2006	S01E18	Intro Joke; Warning: Tonight's episode may contain; E - Earnestness; FO - Fairly obvious Howard jokes; U - Usual humiliation of receptionists; PM - Patchy material; Stunt; Asking Japanese Ambassador Hideaki Ueda for permission to hunt Japanese people for research; Stunt; Hunting Japanese people for research; Surprise Spruiker; Soccer store; Citizens Infringement Officer; ABC Board Director; Wanker number plates; Ad/Trailer; The Quinny-Roos; Song; Cover of Cannibal Corpse's "Rancid Amputation"; Stunt; Reading excerpts from Jonestown live on Alan Jones' 2GB radio show; What Have We Learned From Current Affairs This Week?; Youth going wild update; Obsessive-compulsive disorder; Lesson 12: Neighbours from hell; Ad/Trailer; Are You Being Shagged?; In Other News; Honey, We're Killing the Kids; Italy's World Cup win; Stunt; Claiming World Cup victory for Australia; Thought for the Day with Alan Jones; Ad Road Test; Coles Supermarkets; Credits; Scene with the Quinny-Roos	18
Comments	At the end this episode Charles Firth (who said the closing words instead of Reucassel) and Dominic Knight (who also made an appearance as Hansen's bassist during this episode) sat on the couch, too. This was the only time the entire Chaser team was at the set of The Chaser's War together.		
21 July 2006	S01E19	Intro; Bulldogs Incident, Morris Iemma; Stunt; The Bulldogs Supporters Kit; Ad/Trailer; 48th Annual Snuff Film Awards; Scenes From The Life of The Crazy Warehouse Guy; Asking for the time at Flinder's Street Station; Stunt; Berating animals for wearing animal fur coats; Song; Fan of Doctor Who; Ad/Trailer; Catalyst; In Other News; Alan Moss, Max Moore - Wilson; Stunt; Free food; Pursuit Trivia; Bruce Scott; Stunt; Trying to get a tip for doing minor tasks for people; Ad/Trailer; Brightly Bloom The Daffodils	19
Comments			
28 July 2006	S01E20	Intro Joke; Special Guest Boner; Eddie McGuire.; Stunt; Paying to speak to Jetstar CEO.; Stunt; Where can you take a horse?; Ad/Trailer; Mad Tofu Disease.; Stunt; IKEA DIY disaster.; Ad/Trailer; Throat Cancer Theatre Society.; What Have We Learned From Current Affairs This Week?; Rage; Lesson 12: Petrol Prices; Stunt; Taking an army of David Szymczaks to Channel Seven.; Ad/Trailer; Sandy toilet paper.; In Other News; Kim Beazley's stance on Uranium mining; Rob Moodie wearing skirt and blouse; Qantas refunds; Stunt; Getting Rebecca Clarke a refund from Qantas.; Jessica Rowe; Price of bananas and petrol; Paris Hilton's new album; Stunt; Playing Paris Hilton's "Stars Are Blind" in Hilton Hotel.; Ad Road Test; Subway.	20
Comments			
4 August 2006	S01E21	Intro Joke; Special Guest Drunk: Mel Gibson.; Stunt; Hugging the Prime Minister; Ad/Trailer; Advanced Back Hair; Studio segment; Say What?! - Parody of Rove's segment "What The?"; Stunt; 24-Hour Availability play-off; Ad/Trailer; The Adventurous Diner.; Stunt; Restaurant serenades.; Subtitle; Another Saddam Outburst.; Ad/Trailer; Snorto breaks on Stateline.; In Other News; Mel Gibson; Roche's lavish dinners; Stunt; Doctors showing up at Roche for free dinner; Yasmin's Getting Married; Exploding Dell laptops; Price of bananas; Stunt; Using bananas as currency.; Surprise Spruiker; Sexpo.; What Have We Learned From Current Affairs This Week?; Protecting your sources; Lesson 13: Ethnics; Un-Australian things; Stunt; How Australian are Today Tonight and A Current Affair?; Ad/Trailer; Frannos and the Morning Crew on Radio National	21
Comments			
11 August 2006	S01E22	Intro Joke; Special Guest Commentator, Dean Jones.; Stunt; Census Night at a theatre.; Door to Door; Have You Slept With Shane Warne? (Census Night); Stunt; JB Hi-Fi naming and shaming.; Stunt; Downselling (holding stuff).; Scenes From The Life of the Crazy Warehouse Clearance Guy; Starbucks.; Song; Crazy Warehouse Duet.; Subtitle;A Message From Osama Bin Laden.; 2:30 report; Gameshows.; Ad/Trailer; Are you Being Shagged?, Part 1.; In Other News...; Ad Road Test; NRMA	22
Comments	Cameo; Peter Berner.; The census night stunt was fake. It was filmed after at the end of the real show, just like the stunt on sunrise in an earlier episode.; The census night stunt was at a Belvoir Street Production.		
18 August 2006	S01E23	Intro Joke; Special Guest Paedophile: Mr Baldy.; Stunt; Arrive at airport in large plastic bags.; What Have We Learned From History?: Trojan Horse.; Ad/Trailer; Australian Defence Force Birdman Rally.; Stunt; Video Surveillance Test.; Ad/Trailer; Medibank Private - Helping Members, Healthier Profits.; The Surprise Spruiker; Dell Battery Explosions.; Stunt; "World Famous" - Charles Firth in Kenya.; Ad/Trailer; Little Britain Impersonations.; What Have Learned From Current Affairs This Week?; Unsubstantiated Bullshit; Lesson 14: Fatties.; Pursuit Trivia; Bob Brown - In sport, what is BMX short for? (Incorrect) (Bicycle Moto-Cross).; In Other News...; Rising Cost of University Degrees, LPG Subsidy, Prince Harry Groping, Bali 9 sentence reductions.; Stunt; Al Kyder and Terry Wrist.; Ad Road Test; Ford Focus	23
Comments			
25 August 2006	S01E24	Stunt; Steakhouse diners choosing their own cow; Ad/Trailer; Dongers - Parody of Hooters; Citizens Infringement Officer; Bad mobile phone ringtones; Ad/Trailer; 2006 Cameraman's Gift; Stunt; Burglary made easy; Stunt; Child-controlling medication; Scenes From The Life of the Crazy Warehouse Guy; Calling a friend on a tram; In Other News; Tony Abbott's opposition to stem cell research; Stunt; Tony Abbott hybrids; The Australian cricket team at boot camp; Darrell Hair accusing Pakistan of ball-tampering; US takeover of Coles Myer; Stunt; Price check on Coles; What Have We Learned From Current Affairs This Week?; Lesson 15: Moral Judgement; Naming and Shaming; Reasons to panic; Stunt; Shotgun; Ad/Trailer; Wankster Ringtones; Andrew Hansen's closing comment; New DVD available: 'How to Use the Last 15 Seconds of Your Show Plugging Shit'; Credits; Brendan Nelson getting a ticket from the Citizens Infringement Officer	24
Comments			
1 September 2006	S01E25	Studio segment; Telstra magician; Mr. Ten Questions; Anthony LaPaglia; Stunt; Australian Defence Force recruitment/conscription; Ad/Trailer; Bonsai logging on Stateline; Song; Prolix Songwriter; 2:30 Report; Christian shows; Famous Face Off; Models, Annalise Braakensiek and Kate Fischer; Ad/Trailer; Daggs; In Other News; Jihad Jack Four Corners interview; Tom Cruise not allowed on Oprah; Gary Neiwand jailed; Junk food advertising blamed for childhood obesity; Stunt; Coco Pops Monkey confronts Monica Trapaga; Scenes From the Life of the Crazy Warehouse Guy; Amusement park; Ad Road Test; Godfreys vacuum cleaners; Ad/Trailer; Daggs	25
Comments	According to the Series 1 Volume 2 DVD commentary, all of the Chaser performers agree that this is the worst episode they have made to date.		
8 September 2006	S01E26	Stunt; Jihad Jack.; The Surprise Spruiker; Persian Rug Warehouse; Stunt; McDonald's upselling.; Citizens' Infringement Officer; Baby names.; Ad/Trailer; CarltonUnited 93.; Stunt; Courtesy Bus (read comment below); Song; BoyBand; Ad/Trailer; Are you Being Shagged?, Part 3.; What Have We Learned From Current Affairs This Week?; Walking along the beach stunt and awards. Biggest overstatement, best comic turn, most number of nods during an interview, most dangerous place in Australia, wildest youths, most appearances by an expert and the slightly less crap than Today Tonight award.; Ad/Trailer; Persian Rug Clearance commercial on DVD.; In Other News...; Al-Qaeda needs more members stunt and Scientology spiritual first aid stunt.; Subtitle; A Message From Osama Bin Laden.	26
Comments	Craig was sick in this episode and could hardly speak.; Jihad Jack is a fan of The Chaser.; It was stated in the commentary that the surprise spruiker might have died in this episode.; In the McDonald's upselling stunt Chas did not order everything as there was some items missing from that McDonald's menu.; They actually bought a lot of what Chas ordered in the McDonald's stunt.; In the Citizens' Infringement Officer segment, two of the names given were false. Julian set up the baby with his name and the baby with the name of Pegasus Ezekiel was made up because the lady knew it was not real.; The courtesy bus stunt was fake. Julian said it was a sketch done like a stunt which is what he called a skunt or a stentch.; Craig Reucassel's son, Ollie, was the child thief in 'What Have We Learned From Current Affairs This Week?'.; The Scientology stunt was filmed for Episode 22 but kept getting bumped.		

== Series 2 (2007) ==
Original air date	TV broadcast	Synopsis	#
28 March 2007	S02E01	Intro Joke; Token Cute Animal - Knut.; Change of names; Craig - Wil Anderson, Chris - Corinne Grant; "3 New Viewers" - ABC Bias Police; Reference to 1 v 100; Stunt; Craig Reucassel confronting Peter Debnam in speedos and a baseball cap.; Song - Qantas Advertisement, parody of I Still Call Australia Home; Stunt; Julian Morrow confronted Marcus Einfeld about his recent issues in court. Then performed stunts to mock the issue.; Free Hugs Campaign; The Fixers; The Chaser - Advertising cabbies (fixed) and David Hicks (not fixed).; Scenes From The Life of the Crazy Warehouse Guy; Church.; What Have We Learned From Current Affairs This Week?; Jodi Power and Mercedes Corby; Body Language Experts; Safe with a baby.; Song; "Goodbye Plastic Face" - Andrew Hansen dedicates a song to Naomi Robson; Ad/Trailer; Too many Americans on Channel Ten.; Ad Road Test; Wendy's, A flavour for every state of mind.; Andrew Hansen's Closing Comment; Craig: "or catch the repeat of the show after Lateline." Andrew: "That's the show hosted by ALP candidates."	27
Comments	Change of names - Reference to the axing of The Glass House.; Scenes From The Life of the Crazy Warehouse Guy was revealed to be a Sketch not a stunt on the DVD commentary track; The stunt involving Marcus Einfeld was cut from the DVD for legal issues.		
4 April 2007	S02E02	Intro Joke; Swimmer who should have taken drugs: Grant Hackett.; Stunt; Malcolm Turnbull's house for Sydney's hour of darkness.; Stunt; West Coke Eagles.; Clive The Slightly-Too-Loud Commuter; Calling doctor about his bent penis on a train.; Citizens' Infringement Officer; Bad tattoos.; Ad/Trailer; The Biggest Muslim; Firth in the USA; Punishment T-shirts.; If Life Were A Musical; Loose and tight pants.; The Fixers; Hanson and Oldfield (not fixed), British hostages in Iran (fixed), Brian Burke (fixed) and recycled water (Stunt; public taste test of water) (not fixed).; Pursuit Trivia; Tony Windsor, What is the official language of Easter Island? (Incorrect) (Spanish).; The News According To Fox; Fair and Balanced, Chuck Norris, clutter screen with useless information and Anna Nicole Smith.; Stunt; Blind taxi driver.; Andrew Hansen's Closing Comment; "Please note too that from next week we will be moving to Channel Seven like every other ABC comedy"; Credits, Pursuit Trivia Continued; "Which lovable Beverly Hillbilly died aged 95 in 2003?" (Incorrect) (Buddy Ebsen).	28
Comments			
11 April 2007	S02E03	Intro Joke; Bridalwear By Ray's Tent City.; What Have We Learned From History; Adam and Eve accepted fruit from a serpent.; Ad/Trailer; 2007 Global Warming Games.; Firth in the USA; Hillary Clinton Intern.; Stunt; Sprinkling of Mother Ashes.; Ad/Trailer; JTV Wolfmother.; What Have We Learned From Current Affairs This Week?; Who To Blame?; Lesson 16: Humiliation.; Clive The Slightly-Too-Loud Commuter; Drugs on a Train.; The Fixers; Chas' Smell (not fixed), Libby Lenton and Bra Boys (Not Fixed).; Ad Road Test; The Flashbeer commercial for Carlton Draught.; Credit joke; Chris Taylor's mother is not really dead. Please do not send flowers.	29
Comments			
18 April 2007	S02E04	Before Show Joke; Pg Version.; Intro Joke; When in Melbourne The Chaser Team stay at Broughton Hall.; Stunt; Sunrise(TV) Dawn Service.; Stunt; Pokies & Live Music.; Ad/ Trailer; Make up your own mind (McDonald's) (Part 1).; Stunt; Grim Reaper, Job Applications.; Surprise Spruiker; Imam Ali ben Abi Taleb Mosque at Lakemba making comments on Sheikh Taj El-Din Hilaly; What you missed on Cable; Maury Povich + Easter Specials.; Ad/ Trailer; Make up your own mind (Part 2).; Song; Pauline Pauline Pauline.; Citizens' Infringement Officer; Fining people speeding (above the limit) in car parks.; Ad/ Trailer; Copycat effect.; Stunt; Buying a Bed.; Andrew Hansen's Closing Comment; "Or if you're very quick why not check out some clips on YouTube, Before some 15-year-old kid deletes them all."; Ad/ Trailer; Make up your own mind (McDonald's) (Part 3).	30
Comments			
25 April 2007	S02E05	Intro Joke; Token Anzac Day picture.; Change of names; Various Big Brother Australia 2007 housemates.; Sketch; Chaser Channel Nine pilot, brought to you by Toyota, including: Surprise Spruiker; Coles ("totally brilliant supermarket").; Stunt (Election Wach); John Howard, ("I like Work Choices").; What We Have Learned From Current Affairs This Week?; "A Current Affair Leads in Exclusives... and General Excellence".; Stunt; Could Mr Darcy (Pride and Prejudice) pick up a girl?.; If Life Were A Musical; "I need a hammer".; Stunt; Dancing with Kerry-Anne.; Stunt; Putting people on hold.; Sketch; The Logie Orchestra in normal life.; Firth in the USA; Famous world landmarks being told they are all in Australia.; What Have We Learned From Current Affairs This Week?; Segues, Lesson 17: Menaces to Society.; Ad/Trailer; "Let's Ground JetStar".; The Fixers; Alan Jones, Graffiti, Immigration, Dolly Magazine.; Ad/ Trailer; Make up your own mind (McDonald's) (Part 4).; Andrew Hansen's Closing Comment; "And remember as I always like to say about the show..." (orchestra plays).	31
Comments			
2 May 2007	S02E06	Intro Joke; Apparent celebrity: Michael Weatherly; Change of names; Craig - Rove McManus, Chris - John Wood, Chas - Kate Ritchie, Julian - Bert Newton, Andrew - Natalie Blair.; Stunt; Mark Latham's Ghost.; Mr. Ten Questions; Jimmy Wales.; Stunt; Baby admission.; Song; Gas Guzzlin'.; Stunt; 3 Minute Angels.; Scenes From The Life of the Crazy Warehouse Clearance Guy; Tourist photos.; The News According To Fox; Ad/Trailer; Statue Parkinson disease.; The Fixers; Snoop Dogg, overweight children, Newsagents.; Ad Road Test; Fantastic Soho's Delites.	32
Comments	Change of names: The nominees for the 2007 Gold Logie award.		
9 May 2007	S02E07	Intro Joke; Special budget analysis: Bindi Irwin; Intro; 2007 Federal Budget.; Change of names; Craig - Adam Hills, Chris - Dave Hughes, Julian - Hamish, Chas - Andy, Charles - Fifi Box.; Stunt; The Logies.; White powder on red carpet.; American TV stars here for Australia.; Stealing a Logie award.; Work Experience with Richard Wilkins.; Ad/Trailer; Segway 1000.; Citizens' Infringement Officer; Pants too low / Underwear too high.; If Life Were A Musical; "Welcome Back Mrs. Henderson".; Firth in the USA; Iraq Poll.; What Have We Learned From Current Affairs This Week?; Segues, ANZAC tributes, War veterans. Lesson 18: Useful Advice; Noisy Sex, Strawberries for whitening teeth, Home-Made Lip Gloss, Pauline Hanson's taxi fare offer.; Ad/Trailer; Starship Preposterous.; The Fixers; Qantas takeover, Wages (directed at Priceline and API).; Ad Road Test; The Lose Yourself in Melbourne tourism campaign.	33
Comments	Andrew was absent from the studio links in this episode due to illness.; Change of names - the presenters of the 2007 Logies.		
16 May 2007	S02E08	Before Show Joke; Disclaimer stating The War do not reflect their content as much as Bastard Boys but just as biased.; Intro Joke; Special Guest Fainter: Kellie Sloane; Change of names; Craig - John Coombes, Chris - Chris Corrigan, Chas - Greg Combet, Julian - Peter Reith, Andrew - Bill Kelty.; Intro; Australian Cricket Team banned from Zimbabwe.; Stunt; Following John Howard with a boombox playing his recorded phone message.; Ad/Trailer; The Shawskank Redemption starring Paris Hilton (parody of The Shawshank Redemption).; Stunt; Finding Public Address systems in businesses and making announcements.; Song; I Still Can't Accept What a Knob I Am (parody of I Still Haven't Found What I'm Looking For).; What Have We Learned From History; Germany invading Poland in World War II.; Ad/Trailer; Inside the ACTU boardroom.; The Fixers; Fairfax (aimed at David Kirk), Taj El-Din Hilaly (for his tape over his mouth comment); Nut Job of the Week; Road testing The Secret.; Ad/Trailer; Crocodile Dundee in Bermuda (parody of the Crocodile Dundee series of films aimed at Paul Hogan's tax evasion).; Stunt; UN peacekeepers protecting Australia from violence.	34
Comments	Change of names; Those involved in the 1998 Australian waterfront dispute, as characterised in Bastard Boys.		
23 May 2007	S02E09	Intro Joke; Next ALP candidates: B1 & B2.; Change of Names; Craig - Paul Vautin, Chris - Peter Sterling, Chas - Ray Warren, Andrew - Paul "The Chief" Harragon, Julian - Matthew Johns.; Stunt; Political donations: New South Wales Labor Party - Ku Klux Klan Australia: ACCEPTED; New South Wales Liberal Party - Man-Boy Love Association: ACCEPTED; Federal Australian Labor Party - al-Qaeda Australia: REJECTED; Federal Australian Liberal Party - al-Qaeda Australia: ACCEPTED.; Surprise Spruiker; Channel Nine headquarters.; Ad/Trailer; Parody of Kevin Rudd's current TV political campaign.; Ad/Trailer; Roget's Thesaurus movie trailer.; Song; I Am Thesaurus (parody of I Am the Walrus).; The Fixers; Fatwas (for Julian's stunt with Shiekh al-Hilali the previous week); responsible drinking.; What You Missed on Cable; Maury moment featuring 90-year-old stripper, comparing ABC TV sports with Foxtel sports.; Ad Road Test; the Australian Seniors Finance ad where seniors use bricks instead of coins and cash.	35
Comments	Change of names - commentators for the first game of the State of Origin was being held the night this episode went to air.		
30 May 2007	S02E10	Intro Joke; The Chaser Team dressed by Amanda Vanstone.; Change of names; Craig - Matthew, Chris - Mark, Julian - Luke, Chas - John, Andrew - Satan.; Stunt; Waiters taking away unfinished drinks.; Stunt; Chas' dog Sonny earning a doctor degree and entering practice.; Ad/Trailer; Myfbusters (parody of MythBusters).; If Life Were A Musical; Press conference with The Veronicas.; Ad/Trailer; Hausfrau Hitler (Parody of Mrs. Doubtfire).; Stunt; ALP preselection for ABC TV personalities and stuff.; Ad/Trailer; Australia's Workplace Relations System.; What Have We Learned From Current Affairs This Week?; Lesson 19: Desperate Angles; Ad/Trailer; Big Brother, Big Arseholes. (Parody of the Big Brother "secret" commercials); The Fixers; Government annihilation (pressing a large Ctrl-Z model of the keyboard buttons), Coked Up Lawyers (drugs in the law profession).; Scenes From The Life of the Crazy Warehouse Guy; Surgery.; Stunt; Spur of the moment In-Store Appearances in random businesses featuring Spiderbait.	36
Comments	Change of names - Characters in Christianity		
6 June 2007	S02E11	Intro Joke; Political Prisoners of the week: Paris Hilton and Aung San Suu Kyi.; Change of names; Craig - Mick Molloy, Chris - Nikki Osborne, Julian - Akmal Saleh, Chas - Gary Eck, Andrew - Jackie O.; Intro; Paris Hilton goes to jail; John Howard "Who do you trust?".; Stunt; Testing the Peel Hotel and Polish club's gaydars with Tinky Winky.; Mr. Ten Questions; Sophia Loren.; Stunt; The Licciardello Plan for climate change.; Ad/Trailer; First Tuesday Porno Club (Parody of First Tuesday Book Club).; Citizens Infringement Officer; Wacky comedy T-shirts.; Ad/Trailer; "Thank Allah You're Here" (Parody of Thank God You're Here).; Firth in the USA; What do Americans remember about 11 September 2001.; Song: "US Bases, hell why not?" (parody of "US Forces" by Midnight Oil highlighting (former lead singer) Peter Garrett's changes of policy).; Observation; Different types of footwear hanging on wires above houses have different meanings.; Stunt: A large group of people gatecrashing a house that is open for inspection and having a party.; Clive the Slightly-Too-Loud Commuter; Discussing collection of sperm for a sperm bank.; The Fixers; Malcolm Turnbull, Broadsheet newspapers (which involved reading a newspaper blanket on public transport).; Ad/Trailer; Lop off a limb for leprosy day.; Ad Road Test; Discussed inability to road test the new Tooheys New ad due to not knowing the premise of it.; Terrain testing footwear at Athlete's Foot.	37
Comments	Change of names - The cast of the new Channel Nine satire series The Nation.		
13 June 2007	S02E12	Intro Joke; Spoiler result for tonights game: NSW 28 QLD 13; Change of names; Craig - Michael Duffy, Chris - Gerard Henderson, Andrew - Janet Albrechtsen, Julian - Dalai Lama.; Intro; John Howard praying for rain; Dalai Lama meeting the PM.; If Life Were A Musical; Waiting for the doctor.; Ad/Trailer; new directors for The Hobbit: Nick Giannopoulos - The Woggit, Woody Allen, Michael Moore.; Stunt; Getting revenge on security guards.; What have We Learned from Current Affairs this week? Anna's Segue of the Week - Dodgy Barcodes to Logies Fashions. Lesson 20: Chaser Stories including the Peter Meakin Booze Bus stunt and report.; The Fixers; Cloning, which resulted in multiple George Pell's. Julian's Mobile, travelling to Mumbai, India for help.; Mr. Ten Questions - Megan Gale.; Porno Clichés - Stunt: Testing Clichés. Test 1: Handyman. Test 2: Pizza Boy. Test 3: Pool Boy.; End of show joke : No More Material; Song: The Filler Song performed by Andrew Hansen with the coda "Peter Meakin, what a pisshead!"	38
Comments	Change of names - Michael Duffy, Gerard Henderson, and Janet Albrechtsen are Australian columnists. Julian's Name is a reference to Tenzin Gyatso, the current Dalai Lama		
20 June 2007	S02E13	Intro Joke; Disclaimer: Some of the shots in the opening credits may have been set up.; Change of names; Craig - Libbi Gorr, Chris - Lisa Oldfield, Julian - Zoe Sheridan, Chas - Mary Moody; Intro; Today Tonight on The Chaser's fake scenes, James Packer's wedding.; Stunt; Julian using a mobile billboard to advertise "End Mobile Billboards Now!".; Clive the Slightly-Too-Loud Commuter; Talking to his doctor about herpes; Pursuit Trivia; New Zealand Prime Minister Helen Clark; According to the Book of Revelation, what is the Number of the Beast? Answer: Six Six Six (did not answer).; How many states are there in Australia Helen's Answer: Six (correct).; Stunt; Chas taking part in "Pedestrian rage" instead of Road rage (which involved Chas running around with a car parts attached to his body); Stunt; Book fans dressing up as their favourite objects or characters from their books.; Donna Hay cookbook: Some of her recipes and pieces of food.; Stephen Hawking book: Pretending to have Lou Gehrig's disease which included sitting in wheelchairs with heads back and to one side.; The Secret book: Dressing up as a crackpot expert (in white straitjackets).; If Life Were a Musical; Booking a holiday to India at Flight Centre.; The Fixers; Packer media empire, treating Adrian McKenzie as the new James Packer. Paul Keating, Julian asking him if he wanted to star in his new musical Kevin Rudd the Musical.; Ad/Trailer; The new "Battered Sav Supreme" pizza available at Vomino's Pizza (Parody of Domino's Pizza).; Nut Job of the Week; Richard Cohen trying to turn gay people straight which included Chas and Chris trying it out on a gay man for real.; Ad/Trailer; The Crazy Warehouse Guy documentary.; Ad Road Test; The promo where people make lists on the bus for the Seven Network game show The Rich List.; The Riva Instant Coffee advertisement where people put on a dance routine using trolleys in a supermarket.	39
Comments	Change of names - The co-hosts of the Channel Nine panel talk show The Catch-Up which was axed the previous week.; For the Pursuit Trivia part of the show, Julian's goal was to get Helen Clark to say the word "sex" with the New Zealander pronunciation of the number "six" although for her answer to the second question she used a very exaggerated pronunciation for the letter "i".		
5 September 2007	S02E14	Intro Joke; First human to catch horse flu: Matt Shirvington.; Intro; APEC Summit in Sydney, incorrect White House press releases; Stunt; New uniforms for APEC leaders; Stunt; Replacing Australian animals in the zoo; Stunt; Glorifying APEC security measures (including doing checks on a Melbourne tram and in Hungry Jack's toilets); Ad/Trailer; The Horse Flu Handicap horse race at Phlegmington (featured horse flu related names for the horses racing); Clive the Slightly-Too-Loud Commuter; Talking to his doctor about his wife lactating apple cider; Stunt; Sneaking weapons into prison; Song; APEC protester (parody of "Subterranean Homesick Blues" by Bob Dylan); Sketch; Andrew Hansen as a performer on Thank God You're Here; Ad/Trailer; "Dicko" (Parody of Sicko); What Have We Learned From Current Affairs This Week; Lesson 21: Things learned during the break which featured apologising to an actor who was called a pedophile, Mattel toys made with lead paint, on board Kitty Hawk, upcoming election stories, J.K. Rowling story rip-off; Anna Coren's Segue of the Week; Macquarie Bank to Harry Potter; Ad/Trailer; The new Australian WorkChoices advertisements; The Fixers; Kevin Rudd (following him around with a stripper), different versions of the "Kevin 07" T-shirts; Song; "Where's My E?" (about drug use by players in the NRL mainly Andrew Johns and is a parody of "That's My Team" NRL Theme Song; Conclusion; Fake incorrect White House press releases; Stunt; Julian driving around Sydney in a tank including crushing a car	40
Comments	Change of names - The Chaser's names were left as normal but with "W." added as their middle names except for Andrew, who was listed as W. Andrew W.; The title cards during the transitions between segments in this episode read The Chaser's W on Everything also in reference to George W. Bush.; For the closing credits "W." was added as middle name for all of the persons mentioned, too.; During this episode, half the set was barricaded off by metal and concrete fencing in reference to the tight security in Sydney due to the APEC Summit.; It was revealed in the Series 2 DVD commentary that the Thank God You're Here segment was staged. The Chaser contacted the producers and they filmed the piece during the filming of a real episode		
12 September 2007	S02E15	Intro Joke; Special Guest: "Pavarotting"; Intro; APEC, Dryzabone Jackets, George W. Bush's speech mistakes; Stunt; Using a fake Canadian Motorcade to transport Chas dressed up as Osama Bin Laden into the APEC restricted zone; Stunt; Running around the streets of Sydney wearing cardboard Canadian cars; Intro (continued); Shots of The Chaser standing with world leaders on the steps of the Sydney Opera House; Stunt; Are RSL's harder to get into than APEC? (Involves attempting to get into RSL's with APEC ID's); Stunt; Chas ringing up a talkback radio station posing as someone else complaining about The Chaser; Intro (continued); Kevin Rudd impressing the Chinese President Hu Jintao with his knowledge of Mandarin (with The Chasers placing fake subtitles on screen); Stunt; Public APEC Firework viewing including a firework which spelt out "Screw APEC"; Ad/Trailer; Network Ten, Seriously Desperate (hits back at Ten's show Californication); If Life were a Musical; Andrew, Chris and Chas singing to a university student proclaiming their love for her; Stunt; Moving house by transporting possessions via a bicycle courier and then a public bus; Discussion; Using clown doctors when dealing with people putting down their pets and people on death row; Ad/Trailer; Emo laundry powder (parody of Omo); A Message from Osama Bin Laden; Peter Beattie's departure, Chas dressing up as him; The Fixers; Horse Flu: Using a pantomime horse in a horse race; China's Evil President: Getting Chinese officials to pay for bullets beforehand; Foxtel: Andrew Hansen dressed up as Adolf Hitler storming into Foxtel's offices and complaining about the cancellation of one of his shows; Pisshead Troops: Getting politicians to skull long plastic pipes full of beer; Ad/Trailer; Australia Zoo (protecting the Irwin family "species"); Song; "Stairway to Kevin" (parody of "Stairway to Heaven" by Led Zeppelin); End Joke; Giving credit to the other nine people who were arrested for involvement in the fake APEC motorcade	41
Comments	Change of names - The Chaser's names were left as normal but with "Bin" added as their middle names in reference to Osama bin Laden.		
19 September 2007	S02E16	Intro Joke; Only 27 minutes to go until Summer Heights High; Change of names; Craig - James Mathison, Chris - Andrew G, Julian - Kyle Sandilands, Chas - Ian "Dicko" Dickson, Andrew - Marcia Hines; Intro; John Howard's poll results; Stunt; Redecorating Malcolm Turnbull's office with John Howard posters; Stunt; Being able to receive free goods and services on your wedding day (which included a free slab of beer, free food, free movie tickets and popcorn, a free jet boat ride, an unreserved table in an upmarket restaurant with a free dessert and a free performance from Kamahl); Surprise Spruiker; The Royal Australian Navy Base promoting free breast enlargement procedures; Firth in the USA; Should Muslims live as second class citizens in the United States?; Sketch; Movie roles which Hugh Grant tried out for but did not get the part. Included movies such as Jerry Maguire, A Few Good Men and Reservoir Dogs; Stunt; Adult Shrek merchandise aimed at kids (included products such as cigarettes and ash trays, beer, heroin and vibrators); Ad/Trailer; The Comedy Channel's "Fuck-a-thon" (Comedians whose routines are based on saying "fuck" repeatedly) as well as the "Frankston Fest" (Comedians who make bad taste jokes about Frankston); Citizens' Infringement Officer; Terrible hair styles; What Have We Learned From Current Affairs This Week?; Lesson 22: The Supermenace (the top 3 menaces to society, #3: Drugs, #2: Weather, #1: Asians); Ad/Trailer; The "JI Extreme" van with built-in terrorist aid features; Ad Road Test; KFC Mashies (where people play finger soccer with the food in a library followed by playing with all kinds of KFC food in a KFC restaurant); End joke; Playing the credits of The New Inventors	42
Comments	Change of names - Changed to judges and hosts of Australian Idol		
26 September 2007	S02E17	Intro Joke; Now even more silent - Marcel Marceau; Change of names; Craig - Milko, Chris - Kate Richie, Julian - Sally, Chas - Don't Go Alf, Andrew - Quitter; Intro; The Liberal Party of Australia dirt file, assuming John Howard is gay, Kevin Rudd and Alexander Downer talking about tax thresholds including Lateline's "other camera"; Stunt; Bring Rob Mills down to Tasmania to see if the Tasmanian premier Paul Lennon minds; Ad/Trailer; Classic Albums - Sounds of the humpback whale; Open Mic; Upmarket shopping centre, Target, Woolworths, Westfield Group shopping centre; Stunt; Seeing how many times Chas can complain about his meal at a restaurant and have it taken back; If Life Were a Musical; Chas singing about having all his hair on his body shaved off and not just his face in a Barber shop; Ad/Trailer; A Ingmar Bergman directed in-flight safety video, followed up by a review of it by David Stratton and Margaret Pomeranz from At the Movies; The Lab; This week's category: Cosmetics - featuring various gels and creams (also featuring a scene with Julian dressing up as a primary school student and going to school due to the effects of an anti-ageing cream product); Song; "Ass Sol" by Sol Trujillo (directed at his management of Telstra and a parody of the Denis Leary song "Asshole"); The Fixers; Mime: A mimed funeral of Marcel Marceau); Kevin Rudd Asking him if he can speak Chinese and calling him a smart arse in Mandarin; Jetstar: Offering passengers safety ticket upgrades, parachutes and helmets; Andrew Hansen's Closing Comment; Now in the words of Marcel Marceau, Silence	43
Comments	Change of names - Changed to names of Home and Away characters including references to cast members leaving the show		
3 October 2007	S02E18	Intro Joke; On hunger strike for Burma - Isabelle Caro; Change of names; Craig - Sporty Chaser, Chris - Posh Chaser, Julian - Scary Chaser, Chas - Baby Chaser, Andrew - Sporty-ish Chaser; Intro; AFL Grand Final celebrations, Australian citizenship test; Stunt; How many Australian nationals could pass the new citizenship test?; Stunt; Showing prospective lessees around increasingly unsuitable rooms for rent; Ad/Trailer; Stynx deodorant; Stunt; Julian pretending to be an inspector and going around a carpet warehouse sale, putting up signs advertising excessive discounts; Ad/Trailer; The World's Most Inconvenient Interviews 4; Discussion; Israel's kosher mobile phone plans; Ad/Trailer; "Jewcy" Rabbi Phone Chatline; What Have We Learned From Current Affairs This Week?; Lesson 23: When the Cupboard's Bare. How to dredge up news stories from nowhere including reports on a bingo hall which banned patrons from bringing in dogs, a pony that watches TV, illegal trade in shopping trolleys and a woman who plans to have eleven children; Anna Coren's Meaningless Gibberish of the Week; Bizarre intro to a report on corporate law; Ad/Trailer; P&OD Cruises; Stunt; Trying to scare away tourists from climbing the Sydney Harbour Bridge on the grounds that it is a sacred site for white people; Song; Newtown (a satire on Tim Freedman); The Fixers; John Laws cash for comment disclosures, Burma; Stunt; Trying to hold a rave in a clothing store; End joke; Fatboy Slim tour dates	44
Comments	Change of names - Reference to the Spice Girls' forthcoming reunion tour		
10 October 2007	S02E19	Intro Joke; Estimated number of Britney jokes in this episode - 37; Change of names; Craig - Hugh Laurie, Chris - Robert Sean Leonard, Julian - Jesse Spencer, Chas - Omar Epps, Andrew - Lisa Edelstein; Intro; New Tasmanian pulp mill, Hillsong controversy; Stunt; Craig posing as a courier and trying to deliver dangerous or unpleasant items to public buildings, such as live animals and a dummy bomb; Ad/Trailer; Jeff Buckley - The Ultimate Collection; Stunt; What is the most minor disability Chas can claim to have in order to get a disabled - only seat on public transport?; If Life Were a Musical; Applying for a driving license; Ad/Trailer; Albino Man; Citizens' Infringement Officer; Standing on the wrong side of an escalator; Election Watch; The African Immigration Experience; The Fixers; Mr. Potato Head: Following a news story earlier in the week where Sydney Airport detained a passenger trying to smuggle drugs inside a Mr. Potato Head figure; Kerry Packer: Involving his family flouting the hosepipe ban by buying in water from a third - party supplier; The Homeless: Homeless people wearing a poker machine on their body for people to play then "guilt" them to give the money back because they "stole" from a homeless person; Ad/Trailer; Four Corners - Special report on hearse drag races; Ad Road Test; Uncle Toby's Oat Brits (offering an oat - based breakfast cereal to cafe patrons); The Foxtel cable ad where people travel by rolling everywhere; Andrew Hansen's Closing Comment; "We'll catch you again at Hillsong this Sunday ... oh, what a giveaway!"	45
Comments	Change of names - Changed to House cast members		
17 October 2007	S02E20	Pre-show warning - The show may be offensive to Aboriginals and Torres Strait Islanders (A common warning on the ABC; in some indigenous cultures, death is taboo); Intro Joke; Tonight's episode paid for by the Exclusive Brethren; Change of names; Craig - Laurie Oakes, Chris - Jim Middleton, Julian - Glenn Milne, Chas - Paul Bongiorno, Andrew - Michelle Grattan; Intro; John Howard and Kevin Rudd election promises as well as debates and slogans; Stunt; Craig dressing up as Emmett "Doc" Brown from Back to the Future and offering John Howard the chance to go back in time in a DeLorean and undo some of his decisions; Ad/Trailer; Hocktober: A radio program based around the antics of Workplace Relations Minister Joe Hockey.; Open Mic; Railway station, Karaoke at Woolworths; Stunt; Chas taking naps in public when he is forced to wait for goods and services; Ad/Trailer; Cats the movie as directed by Ken Loach; Pursuit Trivia; Joe Hockey; Election Watch; Aboriginal reconciliation; Ad/Trailer; Kevin Rudd election ad in which he admits he steals John Howard's ideas; The Fixers; Peter Garrett: Trying to get him to re-sing his Midnight Oil songs with a band The Chaser supplied; Rip-off memorabilia: Stealing items from the North Queensland Cowboys NRL team at the airport; Skin cancer: Promoting a coffin which has been fitted out as a tanning booth; Identity theft: Stealing the identity of an ANZ security manager at the identity theft conference.; Song; "The Eulogy Song", featuring references to deceased celebrities and how they were disliked when they were alive but treated like "top blokes" once they died; End joke; Radiohead offer	46
Comments	Change of names - Changed to Australian political commentators/journalists		
24 October 2007	S02E21	Intro Joke; Special guest worm: Richard Pratt; Change of names; Craig - John Howard, Chris - Kevin Rudd, Julian - Bob Brown, Chas - Mark Vaile, Andrew - Lyn Allison; Intro; No worm on the show tonight, televised election debate, election soundbites; Stunt; Dressing up as white rabbits and following John Howard around, holding up signs for election issues such as "AFRICANS" and "ECONOMY" that he could "pull out of a hat" in order to win; Stunt; Craig parking in the middle of the supermarket while he does his shopping, pretending that the car is a raffle prize for charity; Ad/Trailer; Liberal Party election ad - If Labour wins, 100% of ACTU officials will be trade union members; Sketch; Japanese TV; Sketch; Chris taking showers and washing his car with the water stored inside a pet camel's hump, in order to beat the drought; Election Watch; Unions; The Fixers; Oversize popcorn: Walking into a cinema with oversized boxes of popcorn ranging from 1 - 2m high; Robert McClelland: Julian interrupting McClelland's speech at the University of Sydney and saying that the floor cannot take any questions today because answers may reflect Labour policy; If Life Were a Musical; Serenading a woman who lent Andrew an umbrella in the rain; What Have We Learned From Current Affairs This Week?; Lesson 24: Attitude.; Anna Coren's Meaningless Gibberish of the Week: Double Standards; Ad/Trailer; Parody of Kevin Rudd and John Howard's "turning off the TV" election ads on YouTube, where Andrew begins to sing a new verse to The Eulogy Song (about David Hookes) but is cut off in the same style as the ads; Andrew Hansen's Closing Comment; "And remember, up next: the worm decides the outcome of Summer Heights High!"	47
Comments	Change of names - Changed to leaders of the major Australian political parties; During the "rabbit" stunt, John Howard referred to "The Eulogy Song" from the previous episode and said "You blokes are a lot funnier when you pick on somebody who's alive." When the clip ended, Chris promised that The Chaser will never again make fun of anything dead, with the exception of Howard's political career.		
31 October 2007	S02E22	Intro Joke; Sporting event no one cares about: Boston Red Sox 4, Colorado Rockies 3; Intro; Family First Party candidate accused of taking pornographic photos of himself, cabinet divisions over Kyoto, Kevin Rudd on Facebook, expulsions from the Labour Party; Stunt; Showing up at Kevin Rudd's house for a sleepover, saying that as his Facebook friends he should let them stay the night; Stunt; Pretending to read Peter Costello's mind via "thought bubbles"; Ad/Trailer; A Convenient Cause; Stunt; Putting WorkChoices advertising stickers on everything in a supermarket, including the employees; Sketch; Face of Jesus seen in a toilet bowl; Stunt; Andrew having conversations while turning his back on the other person, to see if this works as well as it does in soap operas; Election Watch; The Grey Vote; Citizens' Infringement Officer; People wearing "apparel" on a nudist beach (such as watches, jewellery and baseball caps); Stunt; "The Hassler Challenge" - Dressing up as various street vendors/advertisers, trying to make one passerby stop for all five of them; The Fixers; Political advertising: Liberal Party parody of the 1980s AIDS awareness campaign with the Grim Reaper; Funny church signs: Putting up catchy signs outside mosques and synagogues; Julia Gillard: Dressing up as Karl Marx and trying to hug her, asking her to "embrace Communism"; Stunt; "Streaking" fully clothed at nudist events; Andrew Hansen's Closing Comment; "Just a reminder. If you're over 18 and haven't enrolled to vote yet, bad luck, you're too late, because John Howard changed the rules!"	48
Comments	Change of names - The Chaser members' names were translated to Arabic.		
7 November 2007	S02E23	Intro Joke; Late scratching from this week's show: Charles Firth; Change of names; Craig - Master O'Reilly, Chris - Purple Moon, Julian - Mahler, Chas - Zipping, Andrew - Mr Ed; Intro; National Party members going rollerskating, interest rate rise, controversial comments made by Peter Garrett; Stunt; Barricading the house of Glenn Stevens, governor of the Reserve Bank; The Soundbite Challenge; New segment where The Chaser counts up how many times a politician has repeated the same word or soundbite in one press conference. 10 uses of the word "jocular" by Peter Garrett.; Stunt; Telling jokes to Steve Price to find out if he has any sense of humour at all; Stunt; Dumping various items of junk in a modern art gallery and passing them off as new exhibits; Ad/Trailer; Bunnings 1: Takeover of small businesses; Stunt; Trying to bribe people on the street to vote for the Labour Party; Ad/Trailer; Geraldine Doogue emulating Britney Spears; What You Missed on Cable; Paranormal TV including Dead Famous, Most Haunted and Derek Acorah; If Life Were a Musical; Gang warfare (à la West Side Story); The Fixers; Media scrums: Addressing a question to Julia Gillard by way of a remote controlled robot; Union bosses: Going trick-or-treating dressed as union bosses, to see how scary they really are; Ad/Trailer; Bunnings 2: Too busy making commercials to provide any customer service; Stunt; Andrew dressing as Where's Wally? and checking himself into a lost property office; Sketch; Chris paying for live musical performances and podcasts on the train, because he does not have an iPod; Andrew Hansen's Closing Comment; "And as always, I'd like to leave you with a funny quip, but unfortunately our writers have gone on strike."	49
Comments	Change of names - Changed to names of horses which raced in the 2007 Melbourne Cup.; The Intro Joke refers to the collapse of the satirical newspaper The Manic Times, which Charles Firth left The Chaser in order to produce.; Andrew Hansen's Closing Comment was a reference to the 2007 Writers Guild of America strike.		
14 November 2007	S02E24	Intro Joke; There's a Supreme Court injunction against this gag; Change of names; Craig - Defecting to Nine, Chris - Defecting to Seven, Julian - Defecting to Understanding 50 Ads, Chas - Defecting to Ten, Andrew - Defecting to SBS; Intro; Election campaign launches and slogans, people falling asleep at the sight of John Howard; Stunt; Craig posing as an outdoor portrait artist and demanding large amounts of money for drawing stick figures of people; Ad/Trailer; Least Favourite Things; Open Mic; Qantas terminal; Stunt; Chas requesting a doggy bag for a very small amount of leftovers in a restaurant; Clive the Slightly-Too-Loud Commuter; Discussing a plan to murder his mother; Ad/Trailer; Elizabeth: The Golden Age with Bob Dylan taking Cate Blanchett's role as Elizabeth I of England (a reference to Blanchett playing Dylan in the film I'm Not There); Election Watch; The Environment; The Fixers; John Edward: Dressing up as the Ghostbusters and confronting Edward with a "bullshit meter"; Smoking: Julian pretending to be a terminally ill patient and asking people if they recognize him from the warning pictures on cigarette packets; What Have We Learned From Current Affairs This Week?; Lesson 25: Hiding bad acting, Lesson 26: Product placement, "Highly dubious reenactment" of the footage The Chaser shot at Today Tonight before being issued with a court injunction; Anna Coren's Segue of the Week; From the Melbourne Cup to a boy band; If Life Were a Musical; Craig applying to a talent agent with his terrible singing; Ad Road Test; The Loctite superglue ad where a man is glued to the ceiling by the soles of his shoes; Novotel commercial featuring wild animals checking into a hotel	50
Comments	Change of names - Suggesting that each member of the Chaser team will leave ABC TV for a rival television network; The Intro Joke refers to the Seven Network injunction taken out against The Chaser for footage taken behind the scenes of Today Tonight.		

== Series 3 (2009) ==
Original Air Date	TV Broadcast	Synopsis	#
27 May 2009	S03E01	The episode featured an introduction sequence instead of opening the titles. The new opening titles featured in episode 2.; The episode featured the existing set which was featured in previous series.; Intro; Parody of the "Chk Chk Boom" girl on National Nine News, Cronulla Sharks group sex scandal; Stunt; Delivery of package containing "young drunk girls" to Cronulla Sharks headquarters, delivery of "young naked boys" to a Grammar School, launching of a blimp containing "young boys inside" within the Vatican; Ad/Trailer; Billy Connolly's Journey Across Iraq; Stunt; suing for money upon misfortunes at a Victoria's Secret store, a steakhouse in the United States, and at Home Depot; Stunt; Governor General Quentin Bryce entry into the Melbourne Club; Open Mic; Cronulla Sharks match; Ad/Trailer; plight to raise donations for the Shore School rowing shed, with funds from "cancer patients, the aboriginal community, and generous persons in Somalia"; Closing joke: Online poll regarding the location for North Korea's next nuclear test site	51
3 June 2009	S03E02	The episode introduced new opening titles.; Intro; Swine flu, Kevin Rudd's budget deficit; Let's Ask Jules to Join Us on the Couch; Transferring terror suspects to secret prisons overseas, with Julian putting up signs to help "hide" the Stare Kiejkuty military base; Ad/Trailer; History of C.M. Coolidge; Stunt; Trying to convert overweight Americans to a diet plan consisting exclusively of hay; Ad/Trailer; Oscar bait, directed by Harvey Weinstein in a shameless attempt to win an Academy Award; Ad/Trailer; Emergency Chat Line; Sketch; How to make money during the recession; Stunt; Craig polling British citizens on whether they would be content to raise taxes to pay for the upkeep of the monarchy, then (when most respondents said no) trying to rent out rooms above Buckingham Palace; Ad/Trailer; Make a Realistic Wish Foundation (a controversial parody of the Make a Wish Foundation that was removed from subsequent airings and also the DVDs); Ad/Trailer; The Inbredy Bunch, starring Josef Fritzl; Closing joke: Online poll about Susan Boyle's breakdown after the Britain's Got Talent final, parade to commemorate the anniversary of the Tiananmen Square massacre	52
25 June 2009	S03E03	Instead of opening titles, featured an introduction sequence about how The Chaser had spent the last two weeks trying to atone for the controversy over the "Make a Realistic Wish Foundation" sketch, which had led to the show being suspended for two weeks. The episode was finally introduced as "The Chaser's Waste of Taxpayers' Money"; Intro; Kevin Rudd car dealer scandal, cameramen being used to replace political journalists, disguising as Michael Jackson in order to interview Rudd about his "anger management issues"; Ad/Trailer; Rudd Safe Haven. Parody of the "Make a Realistic Wish Foundation" sketch, about a refuge for victimised employees of Kevin Rudd; Ad/Trailer; Small Talk with Ray Martin; Sketch; Craig standing in the background while politicians are being interviewed, in order to give an "alternative interpretation" of the speech; Stunt; Praying at the Vatican for the sins of the Catholic Church, which had recently stated "excessive wealth" as a mortal sin; Sketch; Sports commentary; Stunt; Trying to get free transport in London by pretending to be The Stig from Top Gear; Sketch; Verbal boxing match; Web poll; Written in Wingdings font. The text reads: WEBPOLL If you actually bothered to translate this, you are: a. clearly unemployed b. clearly a nerd c. clearly disappointed by now that it's nothing controversial; Andrew Hansen's Closing Comment; "We'll catch you again next week, unless of course we're suspended for what was written in the Wingdings."; Sports-style commentary over the end credits	53
1 July 2009	S03E04	Intro; Vigil for Michael Jackson, Malcolm Turnbull email furore; Ad/Trailer; Baby Day Spa; If Life Were A Musical; Julian, Andrew and Craig singing to a patron outside a theatre in the West End of London, about how the recession has forced them out of acting and onto the streets; Stunt; Julian pretending to work for Apple Inc. and ordering people out of the queue for the new iPhone because they look too nerdy for the target demographic; Ad/Trailer; French and Mormon versions of Cheaters; Song; Ben Lee; Stunt; Getting Japanese people to eat unusual things; Ad/Trailer; Noam - philosophical chat show hosted by Noam Chomsky; Tech Talk; Chas testing the "Love Calculator" application on his phone; Ad/Trailer; Parody of Touching the Void; Web poll; In relation to the Bernie Madoff scandal, would U.S. finance regulations have had more change of identifying the specified fraud if section 2 and section 4 of the US Corporate Governance Act had been enacted ahead of 2006, notwithstanding the proposed amendments by the United States Securities And Exchange Commission? A. Yes B. No; Andrew Hansen's Closing Comment; (Craig) "You can always catch the repeat of the War on ABC2 on Thursday nights ..." (Andrew) "Which of course you already knew if it IS Thursday and you're watching ABC2."; French Version of Cheaters over the end credits. End credits list Chas as "Gvhftr Kijl" (to which he legally changed his name in the "Tech Talk" sketch of this episode)	54
8 July 2009	S03E05	Opening credits list Chas as "Gvhftr Kijl" (to which he legally changed his name in the "Tech Talk" sketch of the previous episode); Intro; Michael Jackson memorial service, Tom Cruise security preparations; Ad/Trailer; Catalyst special report on guide tortoises for the blind; Stunt; Julian trying to give former Prime Minister John Howard a book about how to blame every political failure on the global recession, as Kevin Rudd was out of the country; Stunt; Chas visiting Danny Nalliah during the night to see if he has had any more premonitions (Nalliah claimed to have had prophetic dreams about the Black Saturday bushfires four months before the event); Song; "In the Navy", satirising the HMAS Success sex scandal; Ad/Trailer; The Azzan Project; Middle East TV; New segment in which The Chaser reports on extremist TV programming from the Middle East: such as a cleric who claims that all profits from Pepsi go towards Israeli war efforts, and indoctrination of children; Stunt; Trying to deliver a gigantic replica of The Ashes trophy to the England cricket team, to represent the comparative number of times Australia has won; Sketch; Outsourcing the rest of the episode to Mumbai, including a version of the Citizens Infringement Officer segment with Julian's Indian counterpart issuing fines on turbans; Closing comment; "And remember, you can download tonight's episode from Abc.net.in. Namaste!"; Closing credits in Hindi	55
15 July 2009	S03E06	Intro; Diplomatic standoff between Australia and China, Dick Cheney authorisation of torture; Ad/Trailer; Around a Westfield in 80 Days (with Michael Palin); Stunt; Trying to open a Starbucks outlet inside another Starbucks outlet; Ad/Trailer; Kerry O'Keeffe security alarm; Song; In Due Season (a parody of "Yes We Can"); Stunt; Delivering custom-made artwork to the offices of large corporations; Ad/Trailer; Failed Brand Power commercial directed by Terry Gilliam; Ad/Trailer; Wheels on Meals; Nut Job of the Week; Hypnotherapist Steve G. Jones; Web poll; Mark Webber's win in the Formula One Grand Prix was due to: A. Good driving B. Good luck C. Detailed programmatic specificity	56
22 July 2009	S03E07	Intro; MasterChef Australia crazy, food critic, "plating it up", Peter Garrett; Stunt; Julian attempts to climb the church Prime Minister Kevin Rudd attends, as it is of "spiritual significance"; Stunt; Chas dons his Osama bin Laden costume (from the APEC 2007 motorcade stunt) to test the "alertness levels" at Washington D.C.; Ad/Trailer; The Complete ABC News Collection on DVD; Stunt; Chas poses as an American tourist visiting England who speaks American English but does not understand the local language. Andrew acts as his translator.; Ad/Trailer; Guide Dogs for the Really Blind and Munted; Stunt; Craig promotes "local businesses" by setting up a sausage sizzle, balloons and signage at various brothels and promoting them with a megaphone, balloons and an inflatable tall man; Ad/Trailer; Chase Air's "Business Class Flat Bed Deluxe"; Newsbreak; Andrew presents a news report on a crazed gunman at large, only for the mugshot, number plate of his vehicle and number of the crisis hotline to be hidden by Lotto results on the lower third. The Lotto results at the end of the sketch are hidden by an ABC "Next" graphic.; Ad/Trailer; Buckley's Tavern; Middle East TV; The Chaser reports on Middle East children's TV; such as an Egyptian show denouncing Jews, and a look into the characters of The Pioneers of Tomorrow.; Stunt; Backstage of a Madagascar children's show at Westfield, Chas and Chris accuse the costumed characters of being "Islamic martyrs in waiting"; Sketch; News of the World; a football game between England and Germany on Christmas Day 1914 is replaced by a war, a send-up of the football game during the Christmas Truce; Stunt; Julian, dressed as a news reporter, asks various passers-by in America for comment, with no news and the question "Can you give me a comment?"; Closing comment by Julian; "...that's all we have time for this week, a week where a stupid English backpacker was able to survive 12 days in the Australian bush, but we Aussies can't even survive two days at Lord's."; Web poll; Who's the most idiotic person Channel 9 has ever paid money to? A. Backpacker Jamie Neale, B. Richard Wilkins, C. Sam Newman, D. Eddie McGuire... "and the other 45 options"	57
29 July 2009	S03E08	Intro; Hey Hey it's Saturday, Wilson Tuckey, Election Promises.; Stunt; Sneaking a giant chicken through security by posing as security officers to distract the real ones.; Open Mic: Grand Central Station.; Stunt: Licciardello using cosmetic procedures (Such as hair dye, skin tanning and Botox) to alter half of his body to resemble Daniel Craig.; Stunt; Trying to ruin Norway by stealing folders from their minister of Cultural Affairs, vandalising various signs and placing sting rays in public pools.; Ad/Trailer; Religion on Compass.; Stunt; Asking Texans if they would follow various extreme sections of the Bible, such as killing Reucassel's son because he cursed his father.; Stunt; Getting a pedestrian to take forty different photographs of a group of people.; Ad/Trailer; Stigmata.; Stunt; Licciardello going around Rome and imitating various civilians, a parody of the phrase "When in Rome, do as the Romans do".; Montage/Song; The War is Over. A montage showing The Chaser “making peace” to the people they've wronged.; Credits; Fictional memorials of each cast member.	58
