= Shawskank =

"Shawskank", a modification of The Shawshank Redemption with skank, has been used by news commentators and comedians to refer to situations involving women and prison:

- News coverage of a 2007 case involving Paris Hilton
- "Shawskank Redemption", an episode of SuperNews! covering the 2007 case
- "The Shawskank Redemption", a parody ad run for The Chaser's War on Everything covering the 2007 case
- News coverage of the 2015 Clinton Correctional Facility escape
