= 2MCE =

Australian radio station

Coordinates: 33.4299°S 149.5621°E

2MCE FM Bathurst is a local community radio station, located on the campus of Charles Sturt University in Bathurst, New South Wales, Australia. It broadcasts to the communities of Bathurst and Orange and their surrounds.

2MCE FM is supported by CSU's School of Information and Communication Studies in conjunction with the local community, and operates two frequencies:

- 92.3 MHz in the Bathurst area, broadcasting from a transmitter atop Mount Panorama, with a power output of 1,000 watts.
- 94.7 MHz in the Orange area, broadcasting from a transmitter atop Mount Canobolas, with a power output of 500 watts.

== History ==
The station is one of Australia's oldest non-metropolitan licensed community radio stations. The station began full-time broadcasting in May 1976. Run by dedicated staff and members of the community, the early broadcasts came from a 170 watt transmitter and a bizarre aerial on top of the library.

A 1 kW transmitter was installed on Mount Panorama in 1977, and replaced in 1994. A translator service to Orange (with a separate transmitter on Mount Canobolas) came on-line in 1987.

In 1989 renovations increased the number of studios from one small studio to three somewhat larger work areas, located on the university's Bathurst campus. The studios are also used by students for their course work, and feature broadcast-standard tools and equipment.

== Facilities ==
The station includes two broadcast studios plus three production studios. A separate studio houses a newsroom and produce the nationally networked news service for community stations, the National Radio News.

== Name ==
The "2" in the callsign is the New South Wales prefix for radio stations. The "MCE" in the callsign stands for the university's Bathurst antecedent, Mitchell College of Advanced Education, now Charles Sturt University.

== Notable former broadcasters ==
- Samantha Armytage – Seven News presenter and Weekend Sunrise co-host
- Chris Bath – Seven News journalist and presenter
- Tara Brown – Nine Network, 60 Minutes presenter
- Jon Casimir – producer of Enough Rope and God on My Side; co-creator, producer and writer of The Gruen Transfer; responsible for the creation of The Sydney Morning Herald's news website, smh.com.au
- Anna Coren – CNN International journalist and presenter
- Andrew Denton – (ABC Australia) producer and host of Enough Rope (gold Logie Nominee), producer of The Gruen Transfer
- Melissa Doyle – Seven Network Sunrise presenter
- Amanda Keller – 2WS FM radio announcer, host of Network Ten's The Living Room
- Deborah Knight – Ten News news presenter
- Allison Langdon – Nine News reporter
- Hamish MacDonald – former Al Jazeera English and Ten News presenter and reporter
- Philippa McDonald – senior reporter, ABC TV News
- Mark Reddie – Sydney Reporter, ABC News Breakfast
- Marguerite McKinnon – freelance journalist and writer
- Jessica Rowe – Seven News presenter
- Jacinta Tynan – Sky News Australia journalist and presenter
- Monique Wright – Seven Network Sunday Night reporter
