= Bertrand Newton =

Fictitious character created by Charles Firth

Bertrand Newton is a fictitious character created by Australian comedian Charles Firth for his satirical book American Hoax, the name being a play on Australian television celebrity Bert Newton. The character is a politically left-leaning advertising executive.

In this book Newton was described as the founder the fictitious American 527 Political Action Committee (PAC) AdBack, and also author of an influential booklet on political advertising titled How to Change the World One Ad at a Time (2004).

== Character biography ==
Born in the US in 1972, Newton started out as a student activist in the early 1990s, during which time he got involved in the anti-Gulf War "No Blood For Oil" coalition at Berkley Campus of UCLA. The formation of this group split the movement and ultimately led to his expulsion from the Californian Peace Coalition. He later studied at Oxford University in England and became an advertising executive.

Newton became wealthy creating ads for technology companies during the dot-com boom, before quitting advertising during the post-boom downturn. He then began using his talents and wealth to use the power of modern advertising to bring about political change to make the world a better place.

== Adback ==
AdBack was one of a raft of non-profit companies that were formed to support the Democratic Party in the 2004 Presidential elections. The motto of the organization was "dedicated to changing the world one ad at a time". The non-profit company designed advertisements for several niche markets during the elections, including the award-winning "GayBack" Television commercial that aired in the crucial swing state of Ohio.

Newton's philosophy on political advertising, and organising methods, have their roots in organizations like MoveOn.org, and have been closely connected to George Soros's Open Society Foundation project.
