= Optics (TV series) =

2025 Australian comedy TV series

- Genre: Comedy
- Created by: Jenna Owen; Vic Zerbst; Charles Firth
- Written by: Jenna Owen; Vic Zerbst; Charles Firth
- Directed by: Max Miller
- Starring: Jenna Owen; Vic Zerbst; Charles Firth; Belinda Giblin; Bali Padda; Claude Jabbour; Kate Walsh; Aaron Collins; Virginie Laverdure; Will McNeill; Peter Carroll; Josh McConville; Daniel Cordeaux; Peter Phelps
- Composer: Elliott Wheeler
- No. of series: 1
- No. of episodes: 6

Production
- Executive producers: Todd Abbott; Ian Collie; Charles Firth; Rob Gibson; Rachel Okine; Jenna Owen; Vic Zerbst
- Producer: Paige Wharehinga
- Production location: Sydney
- Editor: Gabriella Muir
- Running time: 26–30 minutes
- Production companies: Easy Tiger; Chaser Digital; Screen Australia; Screen NSW; ITV Studios

Original release
- Network: ABC TV
- Release: 29 January – 5 March 2025

Optics is a TV series that premiered on ABC TV on 29 January 2025. Its first series was broadcast on the ABC TV channel until 5 March 2025. All episodes were available on ABC iview when the series was first broadcast.

== Plot ==
Optics follows two young social media-savvy women, at Fritz and Randell who are suddenly promoted to be CEOs of the company after the original CEO Frank Fritz dies. Along with Ian Randell and Meredith Laughton they work together to find solutions to situations involving public relations crises.

== Production ==
The series was first announced at the ABC's Upfronts event on 21 November 2024, revealing the next year's programming. The series was filmed in various suburbs of Sydney in July 2024, including Annandale, Botany, and Cronulla.

== Cast ==
(Note: As displayed in each episode's credits sequence.)

- Jenna Owen as Nicole Kidman, along with Greta she is catapulted into the role of CEO, bringing a new spin to the company and in order to hide skeletons in the closet
- Vic Zerbst as Greta Goldman, along with Nicole she is promoted to be CEO upon the death of Frank and are at the forefront of navigating public relations crises on behalf of Fritz and Randell
- Charles Firth as Ian Randell, Ian was the heir to the Fritz and Randall PR firm but Bobby gets in the way by appointing Greta and Nicole
- Bali Padda as Cody Smith, assistant to Ian Randell
- Belinda Giblin as Meredith Laughton, the receptionist at Fritz and Randell
- Claude Jabbour as Bobby Bahl, the chair of the board
- Aaron Collins as Dod
- Virginie Laverdure as Anna McDowell
- Will McNeill as Bundy Gribbons, a football player who is prone to getting into accidents so he requires Fritz and Randell's help to get public opinion on his side (episodes one and six)
- Peter Carroll as Frank Fritz, the former CEO who dies therefore beginning the events of the show (episode one)
- Josh McConville as Stevo (episode one)
- Peter Phelps as Rob Ryan (episode one)
- Daniel Cordeaux as Sports Guy (episode one)
- Shingo Usami as Father Mori (episode one)
- Peter Orchard as Alec Nelson (episode one)
- Toby Farrington as Phone Punter (episode one)
- Peter Patterson as Board Member 1 (episode one)
- Malcolm Maguire as Board Member 2 (episode one)
- Paul Doyle as Frank Stunt Double (episode one)
- Rob Flanagan as Old Priest (S) (episode one)
- James Davies as First Priest (S) (episode one)
- Cyrus Ning as Second Priest (S) (episode one)
- Douglas Chalmers as AFL Priest (S) (episode one)
- Kate Walsh as Hannah Halston, an executive of a wellness products brand who seeks the help of Fritz and Randell in episode two
- Lucinda Price (Froomes) as Female Podcast Host (episode two)
- Felynn Teo as Poche Model 1 (episode two)
- Jamaya Masters as Poche Model 2 (episode two)
- King Baba as Poche Model 3 (episode two)
- Stephen Reid as Worker 1 (episode two)
- Molonai Makalio as Worker 2 (episode two)
- Travis Earl as Worker 3 (episode two)
- Alex Lee as Lisa Dove, an executive from an airline who appears in episode three
- Phil Lloyd as John Gammit, an executive from an airline who appears in episode three
- Kaan Gulder as Leo (episode three)
- Tom Cardy as Maitré D, a server who appears in episode three
- Lucas Fatches as Huge Bikie (episode three)
- Deya Miranda as Flamenco Dancer (episode three)
- Francisco Lara Puerto as Flamenco Guitarist (episode three)
- Josh Helman as Archie Toole (episode four)
- Matthew Whittet as Spence Tasker (episode four)
- Stephen Hunter as Gregg Hogg (episodes four and five)
- Nash Edgerton as Jeb Carson (episode four)
- Arielle Carver-O'Neill as Doctor Chailey (episodes four and five)
- Suzy Wrong as Susanna Bali (episode four)
- Sarah Stephens as Roje Daniels (episode four)
- Daya Czepanski as Lou Morgan (episode four)
- Skye Beker as Trainee (episode four)
- Sam Lapin as Hoverboard Rider (episode four)
- Rhys Muldoon as Matthew Chamberlain, an executive of a telecommunications company (episode five)
- Mandy McElhinney as Olivia, the assistant to Matthew (episode five)
- Yaraman (Yaz) Thorne as Ashwin (episode five)
- Jeremy Waters as Finance Guy (episode five)
- Nicholas Burton as 5G Theorist 1 (episode five)
- Dave Hoey as 5G Theorist 2 (episode five)
- Cihan Saral as IT Expert (episode five)
- Chanelle Dylan as Weeping Woman (episode five)
- Joel Beasley as Man #1 (episode five)
- Nakkiah Lui as Dion Kelly (episode six)
- Angela Sullen as Cherie Bakes (episode six)
- Craig Reucassel as Emcee (episode six)
- Michael Hing as Translator (episode six)
- Jason Lu as Alan Ng (episode six)

== Reception ==
The Sydney Morning Herald stated that the show is "Delightfully cynical (it’s about PR, after all), with swipes at just about everyone (the intergenerational sparring apparently inspired by Owen and Zerbst's experiences working with Firth), the series is also a dig at "glass cliffing"; as opposed to the glass ceiling, a glass cliff is when women are promoted only when a company is in trouble and needs good optics." and rated the series four stars out of a possible five star ranking.

The Guardian rated the series four out of five stars, stating that "it makes for a fast-paced, intelligent show that reveals the duplicitous underbelly of public relations in Australia and the way diversity often plays out in the corporate world: as lip service only. Some of the scenarios and characters border on caricature – but when modern life is becoming increasingly cartoonish, maybe that’s not a problem."

Screen Hub gave the series a three out of five star ranking while stating "Optics feels like two warring comedy concepts doing battle, at the occasional expense of laughter."

Writing on The Conversation, Edith Jennifer Hill, an associate lecturer of learning & teaching innovation at Flinders University stated that "The show expertly balances humour with quick-wit, social media vernacular, and a level of marketing wordsmithing that make you question if the news has ever told you a true story."

=== Viewership ===
No.	Title	Air date	Overnight ratings		Ref(s)
No.	Title	Air date	Viewers	Rank	Ref(s)
1	"Episode 1"	29 January 2025	332,000	—N/a	
2	"Episode 2"	5 February 2025	281,000	—N/a	
3	"Episode 3"	12 February 2025	223,000	—N/a	
4	"Episode 4"	19 February 2025	260,000	—N/a	
5	"Episode 5"	26 February 2025	272,000	—N/a	
6	"Episode 6"	5 March 2025	268,000	—N/a	

== Future ==
On 1 December 2025, it was exclusively reported by TV Tonight that the series would not be returning in 2026.
