= Mahbouba Seraj =

Afghan activist humanist feminist

- محبوبه سراج
- Born: 1948 (age 77–78); Kabul, Afghanistan
- Occupations: Journalist, Women's rights activist
- Known for: Co-founder of Afghan Women's Network, Creator of radio program "Our Beloved Afghanistan by Mahbouba Seraj"
- Awards: BBC's 100 Women of 2021, Time 100 (2021)

Mahbouba (Note: Also spelled as Mahbooba) Seraj (Arabic : محبوبه سراج) is an Afghan journalist and women's right activist.

== Early life and career ==
Born in 1948 in Kabul, Seraj attended Malalai High School and later studied at Kabul University. In 2022, in an interview with Afghanistan International she claimed that her grandmother was an enslaved Hazara.

In 1978, Seraj and her husband were put in prison by the Communist Party of Afghanistan and later that year declared persona non grata. She then left for the United States, at least initially New York City, and lived there in exile for some 26 years, before returning to Afghanistan in 2003. Following her return, she co-founded a number of organizations to address corruption and women and children's rights issues. Most notably as a member of the non-profit Afghan Women's Network, she has dedicated her cause to championing children's health, battling corruption and empowering victims of domestic violence. She is the creator and announcer of a radio program for women by the name of “Our Beloved Afghanistan by Mahbouba Seraj” which has been broadcast all over Afghanistan. She has also advocated for women to be part of the political discourse, through a National Action Plan, promoted by the UN.

When the Taliban returned to power in August 2021, Seraj refused to flee the country, deciding to remain in Kabul to continue to work with women and children. In September 2021, she was included in the Time 100, Time's annual list of the 100 most influential people in the world.

She has launched many campaigns both inside and outside Afghanistan to end the hatred of Iranians towards Afghans.

== Recognition ==
She was recognized as one of the BBC’s 100 women of 2021.

The documentary short The Noble Guardian, directed by Anna Coren, is about her work in aftermath of the US withdrawal from Afghanistan and "the plight of women and girls under the brutal Taliban regime that worsens by the day." At the 2023 LA Shorts International Film Festival, it won best documentary
