= Naomi Robson =

American-born Australian television presenter

- Born: 4 December 1961 (age 64); Los Angeles, California, U.S.
- Citizenship: United States; Australia; United Kingdom
- Education: La Trobe University
- Occupations: Journalist, Television presenter
- Years active: 1988–present
- Known for: Seven News, Tonight Live with Steve Vizard, Today Tonight,
- Father: Richard Robson
- Awards: Most Outstanding Public Affairs Program (Logie Awards of 2002)

Naomi Robson (born 4 December 1961) is an American-born Australian television presenter who is best known as the former presenter of the east coast edition of Today Tonight, an Australian current affairs program which was broadcast on weeknights on the Seven Network, from 1997 to 2006.

== Early life ==
Robson was born in Los Angeles, California, in the United States, to father Richard Robson, a professor of chemistry who would go on to win the Nobel Prize, and mother Shirley. As a child she travelled around the world due to her father's work, spending most of her time between Australia and Britain. She eventually settled in Australia and began a Bachelor of Arts degree at La Trobe University in Melbourne, planning on majoring in archaeology and modern art. After two years, Robson dropped out of university to pursue her passion for photojournalism.

Over the next few years, Robson worked in numerous positions, including being an assistant to photojournalists and a copywriter for an advertising agency. She then took a working trip to London, during which she worked as a journalist and as an editorial assistant for a magazine publishing house. After three years in London she returned to Australia and, in 1989, became an assistant editor and feature writer for Personal Success magazine.

Robson holds triple US, Australian and British citizenship.

== Television ==
In 1990, Robson joined Seven News, initially as a general news reporter but three weeks later she was promoted to presenting news on Tonight Live fronted by comedian Steve Vizard. She also presented Seven's Late News as well as Seven's weekend news bulletins and also reported for the current affairs program Real Life. She was also the summer presenter for the program until its cancellation in late 1994. She then hosted a short fill-in program called Summer Diary.

Robson went to the United States in 1995 but shortly returned to Australia to present Our Victoria, a travel show for the Victorian market. She also co-hosted Seven's News at Five with Peter Ford in Sydney. In 1997, she became the presenter of the Melbourne version of Today Tonight. The program was later extended to Sydney and Brisbane, with Robson as presenter. Figures from the ratings research firm OzTAM indicate that she had a nightly audience of more than one million people across the three capital cities.

Suggestions surfaced on 22 November 2006 that she would leave Today Tonight at the end of the year. She confirmed this on 27 November, saying she would pursue her career in other areas of television. She presented her last show on 1 December 2006. Her replacement, Anna Coren, was named six weeks later.

In January 2007, it was reported that Robson had persuaded Seven Network executives to extend her contract with the network so that she could compete in the sixth series of Dancing with the Stars. On 13 March 2007, she was part of the third couple voted off the program. Later in the year, Seven executives were reported in the press saying that Robson would be given her own "Oprah Winfrey" style program where she would have an "opportunity to show off the caring side of her personality". She returned to narrate Seven's factual series Surf Patrol in mid-2008.

In September 2009, Robson appeared as a presenter with Larry Emdur on Seven's The Morning Show, standing in for Kylie Gillies, who was taking a week off.

In December 2014, Robson was a guest on Network Ten's Studio 10, this was the first time she had been seen on another Network other than Seven.

== Controversy ==
Robson has been the subject of a number of unfavourable media reports and controversies.

A number of critical descriptions of Robson have been dismissed by her or her representatives as distortions or fabrications by rival journalists. In particular, when The Daily Telegraph alleged that other reporters called her a "princess" overly concerned with her appearance, Robson herself denied the allegations. When The Australian cited a source describing her as a "cold, waspish, punishment-oriented, dominatrix", Today Tonight producer Neil Mooney described the story as "attempted character assassination ... based on fiction". However, an off-air outburst that was recorded and later broadcast by the Triple J radio station, did provoke a public apology by Robson.

In September 2006, while reporting on the death of Steve Irwin, she appeared on air wearing khaki and with a lizard on her shoulder. Several months later Robson described the incident as a mistake, but that it was not her idea to wear the shirt or the reptile and she was not comfortable with it at the time.

In September 2006, Robson and her crew were detained in Indonesia after arriving in the country with tourist visas to film a story on a boy they believed was in danger of being killed by cannibals. They were later deported.

In early 2010, Robson's manager, Max Markson, made several attempts to remove comments about these controversies from Wikipedia, describing the article on Robson as "libellous". Wikipedia editors responded with concerns that Markson's edits were biased and in contravention of Wikipedia guidelines. The incident attracted media coverage, drawing further attention to the controversies (the so-called Streisand effect).

In August 2010, Robson appeared in a promotion for pay-TV screenings of The Chaser's War on Everything, her former critics, in the form of a mock interview.

== Filmography ==
- Trojan Warrior (2002)
- Thunderstruck (2004)

Media offices
Preceded by Jill Singer	Today Tonight; East Coast Presenter; January 1997 – December 2006	Succeeded by Anna Coren
