= True Stories (TV series) =

- Presented by: Anna Coren; Chris Bath
- Country of origin: Australia
- No. of episodes: 24

Production
- Running time: approx 30 minutes

Original release
- Network: Seven Network
- Release: 2005 – 2006

True Stories was an Australian biographical documentary series which explored the personal journeys of ordinary, and sometimes extraordinary Australians. It is based on the ABC's Australian Story. The 4-episode first season of the program rated well, attracting an average of over 1.7 million viewers per episode. As a result, Channel Seven announced a second season, consisting of over 20 episodes which aired from mid-2006. Original host Anna Coren did not front the entire second season as mid-way through production Coren was posted as U.S. Correspondent for Seven. Because of this, several episodes were presented by Chris Bath.

== Season two episode summaries ==
=== Dylan's Story ===
Original airdate: 9 July 2006

Dylan Hartung is a 7-year-old boy diagnosed with Stage IV Neuroblastoma in 2004. Doctors in Australia were True Stories followed his trip to Australia for treatment at the Memorial Sloan-Kettering Cancer Center.

=== Tim's Story ===
Original airdate: 23 July 2006

Truck driver Tim Stuhlfauth was hijacked and held at gunpoint for 16 hours. Throughout the ordeal, he was forced to consume drugs and drive his rig without a break as the hijacker fired shots in the cabin of his truck. Fearing he would never see his family again, Stuhlfauth gained the courage to evade the hijacker at a petrol station. The story took a twist when the identity of the gunman was finally revealed.

== Ratings ==
=== Season one (2005) ===
The first season of True Stories aired 8:00pm Tuesday nights on the Seven Network. It won its timeslot every week, benefitting strongly from the program preceding it, Border Security, which regularly topped 2 million viewers. Episodes of True Stories that came first in their timeslots have been highlighted in grey.

Ep No.	Average Viewers (5 City Metro, 000s)	Network Share	Airdate
1	1,590	38%	9 August
2	1,590	41%	16 August
3	1,720	44%	23 August
4	1,420	39%	30 August

== See also ==
- List of Seven Network programs
