= Jacinta Tynan =

Australian news presenter and journalist

- Born: 8 August 1969 (age 57); Sydney, New South Wales, Australia
- Occupations: News presenter, journalist
- Children: 2

Jacinta Tynan (born 8 August 1969) is an Australian news presenter and journalist.

Tynan has previously been a news presenter on Sky News Australia

== Career ==
She started her career as a snow reporter for Thredbo before working as a reporter/weather presenter with Win TV, Canberra.

Prior to joining Sky News Australia in 2005, she worked at ABC Television, where she reported and presented for ABC News and the 7:30 Report. She was also the anchorwoman for the ABC's International satellite TV service, the Australia Network (formerly known as ABC Asia Pacific). Tynan was a reporter for ABC News in Darwin and was a relief presenter for Australia Television News. She reported for Today Tonight on the Seven Network, then worked as a producer for APTN and Access Hollywood in London.

She has a Bachelor of Communications from Charles Sturt University, Bathurst, majoring in broadcast journalism. During her studies she was a broadcaster with on-campus community radio station 2MCE-FM.

Tynan also studied acting at the Vancouver Film School in Canada and has written and starred in two short films, one of which was selected as a Tropfest semi-finalist in 2001.

She also acted in The Vagina Monologues at Sydney's Ensemble Theatre and starred in Closer for the Darlinghurst Theatre Company.

Tynan edited Some Girls Do ... My Life as a Teenager (Allen & Unwin, 2007 ISBN 9781741751222), an anthology of Australian female writers.

In May 2020, Tynan was made redundant from Sky News Australia after 18 years with the network.

== Personal life ==
Tynan is one of six children. Neither she nor any of her three sisters are married. In an interview on Today Tonight on 6 August 2007 she revealed that she has a fear of getting married, because her parents had a bad marriage.

She is the grand-niece of John O'Grady (Nino Culotta) who wrote the best-selling They're a Weird Mob.

Tynan is ambassador and a mentor for the Sister2Sister teenage mentor program with the Life Changing Experiences Foundation.

Tynan and her ex-partner have two sons, the first of whom was born after Tynan went into labour while presenting the news on Sky News Australia.
