= Anna Coren =

Australian journalist and occasional news anchor

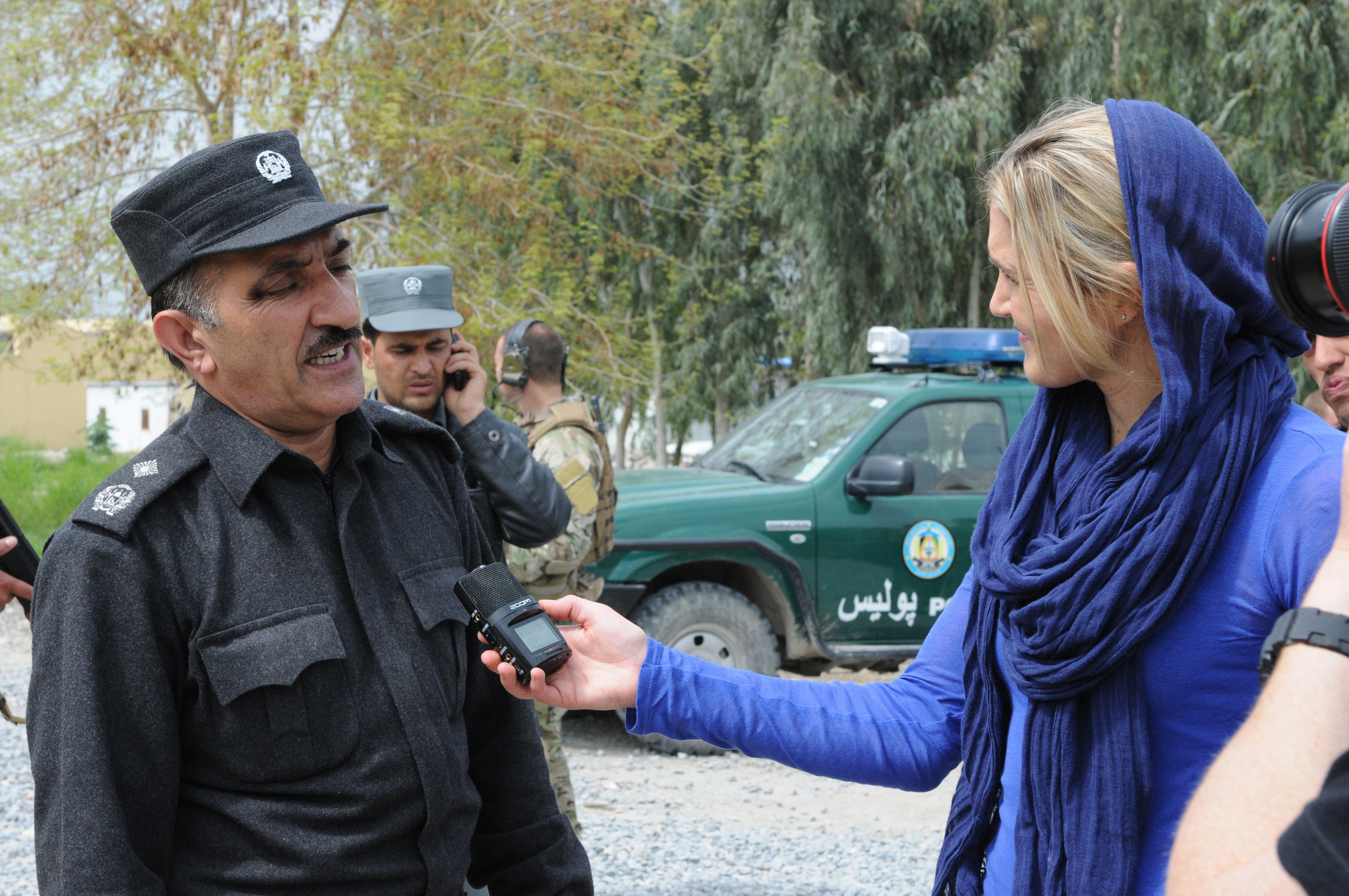
- Coren (right) in Nijrab, Afghanistan, in 2013
- Born: 28 October 1975 (age 51); Bathurst, New South Wales, Australia
- Education: Charles Sturt University
- Occupation: Television presenter
- Years active: 1999−present
- Organization: CBS
- Known for: News anchor International correspondent Documentary film director
- Movement: Political crises and women's rights
- Spouse: Adam Upton
- Children: 2
- Awards: Emmy Award for International Correspondent; Gracie Award (Alliance of Women in Media); Breaking News Award from the Royal Television Society (RTS); Several Asian TV Awards
- Website: CBS News profile Anna Coren

Anna Coren (born 28 October 1975) is an Australian journalist.

Coren is currently a foreign correspondent for CBS News based in Hong Kong. She has previously been a news anchor and international correspondent with CNN.

== Career ==
Coren graduated from Charles Sturt University's Bathurst campus in 1996 with a communications degree and spent time working for regional television networks Prime (12 months) and NBN (18 months). She was picked up by the Nine Network in 1999 and earned a spot as an on-camera reporter for National Nine News in early 2000. In 2002, she began presenting news updates and the National Nine Early Morning News.

Coren's career at the Seven Network began in December 2003, presenting late news updates and presenting the summer edition of Today Tonight in the place of Naomi Robson. She has since presented many one-off events such as Australia's Brainiest Kid, 2005 Edinburgh Military Tattoo, Royal Wedding Night with Seven and Zero Hour – The Bali Bombings. Her role at Seven also involved filling-in as news presenter with the morning news program Sunrise. Coren also presented Seven's factual series True Stories.

In 2005, Coren was appointed United States correspondent for Seven News replacing Mike Amor who returned to Australia to present Seven 4.30 News. In this role she appeared on the Global Notebook segment for Sunrise.

During her tenure as the Seven Network's U.S. correspondent Coren covered the 2006 Israel–Hezbollah War from northern Israel and the 2005 G8 Summit at the Gleneagles Hotel, Scotland.

On 27 January 2007, Coren was appointed presenter of Today Tonight, replacing Naomi Robson who left the show on 1 December 2006. Her role as presenter of Today Tonight saw Coren become the frequent subject of satire by the presenters of the television show The Chaser's War on Everything.

In September 2008, Coren announced that she would be leaving Today Tonight to take up a position with CNN in Hong Kong. She was succeeded by Matthew White, with Coren presenting Today Tonight for the last time on 10 October 2008.

In October 2022, CNN apologised for their coverage of a mass murder in Thailand, after Coren and her cameraman Daniel Hodge were temporarily detained after trespassing and filming a scene without permission. Both were fined $133 and told to leave the country. The Foreign Correspondents' Club of Thailand criticised the action as "unethical" and "insensitive".

Coren directed the documentary short The Noble Guardian, about Mahbouba Seraj. At the 2023 LA Shorts International Film Festival, it won best documentary.

Coren is a contributed author for the book Through Her Eyes – Australia's Women Correspondents from Hiroshima to Ukraine. She wrote about her own experiences reporting from the frontline in Afghanistan.

In January 2025, after 15 years of wide-ranging reporting with CNN, Coren left to join CBS News as a Hong Kong-based foreign correspondent, focusing on the Asia-Pacific region.

== Honours ==
Coren received the 2011 and 2012 Asian Television Award for "Best News Presenter or Anchor" for her work on the CNN program World Report.

In December 2013, Coren received her third Asian Television Award-winning the 'Best News Story 10 minutes or less' for her exclusive report 'Afghanistan Taliban Firefight'.

Coren directed the documentary short The Noble Guardian, about Mahbouba Seraj; at the 2023 LA Shorts International Film Festival, it won best documentary.

== Personal life ==
She has twins with her husband, Australian hedge fund manager Adam Upton. They married in 2016.
