= Charles Firth (comedian) =

Australian comedian

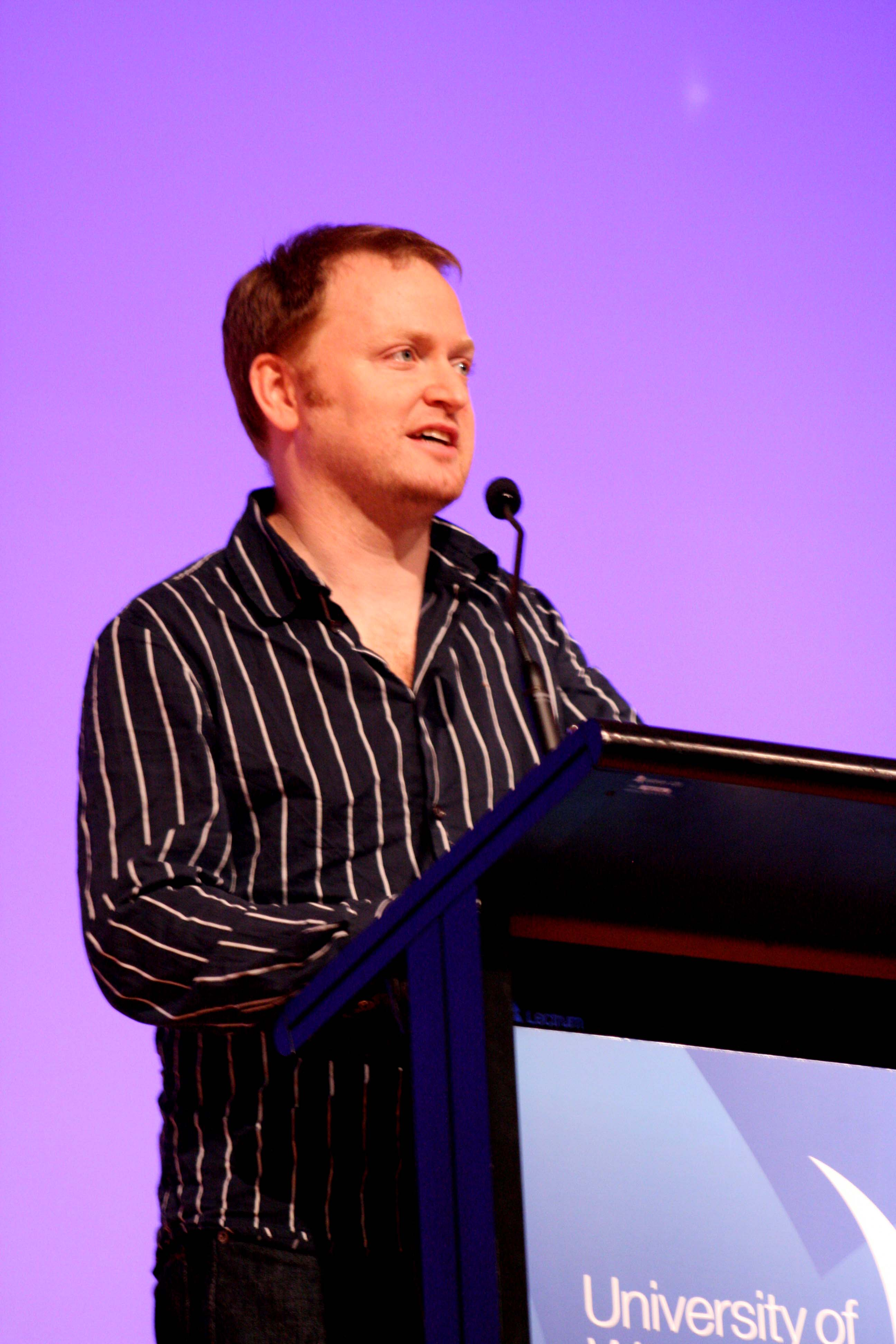
- At the 2009 Australian Power Shift Conference
- Born: Charles Burgmann Firth; Sydney, Australia
- Notable work: CNNNN (2002–2003); Optics (2025–present); The Chaser's War on Everything (2006–2007); Manic Times

Comedy career
- Years active: 1999–present
- Medium: Print, online and television
- Genre: Satirical comedy
- Website: www.chaser.com.au

Charles Burgmann Firth is an Australian comedian, best known as a founding member of The Chaser.

== Early life ==
He is the brother of Verity Firth, who was a Minister for the Labor Government of New South Wales. Firth attended Sydney Grammar School, where along with Chaser colleagues Dominic Knight and Chas Licciardello he ran the satirical school magazine The Tiger.

== University years ==
Firth attended the University of Sydney, where he completed an Arts degree in political science and edited the Honi Soit student newspaper. While attending, Charles was also the subject of a reality-TV style documentary called Uni, by film-maker Simon Target, centred on the lives of students at the University of Sydney. Fellow Chaser Andrew Hansen was also a subject. It was aired on the ABC in 1996.

== Comedy career ==
Firth's first arrest was notably during the filming of the first film in The Matrix franchise, after he was caught naked, jumping on Keanu Reeves' motorcycle. Reeves was later quoted saying "It was the craziest proclamation of love I've ever received."

On CNNNN, broadcast in 2003 and 2004, he played a role as host of the fictional segment "The Firth Factor", parodying journalistic styles used by the American Fox News commentator Bill O'Reilly's prime time show The O'Reilly Factor.

During his time in the United States, Firth also researched and wrote his first book, American Hoax. This involved creating a number of fictional stereotypical American characters on both the progressive-left and conservative-right sides of American politics. The characters included liberal ad-man Bertrand Newton, conservative scholar Dr Andrew O'Keefe, conservative economist Edward McGuire, working class bartender Darryl Summers, and female Iraqi-immigrant poet Khorin al-Ghrant. The book explored the efforts of these characters (all played by Firth) to try to interact with real-world political groups and individuals. American Hoax was released in November 2006.

Firth went to Adelaide in July 2007 to present at the Festival of Ideas with fellow Chaser Julian Morrow, where his performance included asking the audience to SMS their questions to him, throwing lollies to the audience, and "defacing" three Wikipedia articles.

Firth worked on a new weekly print magazine and news website, which was launched in mid-August 2007 called The Manic Times. The newspaper has since ceased production and that company is now called "Manic Studios" producing web video for the Australian, and more recently, American Union movements in partnership with The Republic. Firth remains actively involved as a writer, performer and producer.

Firth was the executive producer on a daily news satire program on ABC2 called The Roast.

He generated controversy among the Westboro Baptist Church when he began to openly "flirt" with Fred Phelps's son while interviewing him for The Chaser's War on Everything at a Westboro picket. When Phelps junior began to walk away, Firth followed him and continued to openly "flirt" with him, persisting despite being called a "fag-ass pervert" by the rest of the picketers.

In 2008, Firth created a one-hour television special for SBS on the then forthcoming US election, titled 'Mr. Firth Goes To Washington'. It aired on Tuesday, 4 November at 8:30pm. A blog was also posted for this mockumentary at the SBS website.

Firth co-hosted Episode 50 – "The Chaser Special" – of the Macquarie Radio Network's podcast "Radio Ha Ha" on 10 November 2006. Outtakes from this episode were run in Episode 51 – "The Belated 50th Episode Special" the following week, on 17 November 2006

In 2020, Firth began working with fellow Chasers Dominic Knight and Andrew Hansen on a new podcast project, "The Chaser Report". Initially started as a satire of the weekly COVID news cycle.

In 2023, Firth presented a comedy show entitled Wankernomics with fellow comedian James Schloeffel from satirical website The Shovel. The show was presented at the Adelaide Fringe Festival, Sydney Comedy Festival and Melbourne International Comedy Festival. They described their show as delivering "a 60-minute MBA that you can add to your LinkedIn profile later".

As of 2025, Firth was working on a new comedy TV series titled Optics that was broadcast on ABC TV.

== Personal life ==
Firth is married to Amanda Tattersall, founding director of the Sydney Alliance and co-founder of getup.org.au, a community organiser and author of Power in Coalition a book on building coalitions between unions and community organisations.

Firth is known to have played in an amateur cricket team, "The Mighty Dicks", with Chris Taylor and Julian Morrow.
