= The Chaser's War on Everything =

Australian television satirical comedy series

- The Chaser's War on Everything season two intertitle
- Genre: Comedy; Satire
- Created by: The Chaser
- Directed by: Craig Melville, Nathan Earl, Bradley J. Howard, Mark Fitzgerald, Trent O'Donnell
- Starring: Andrew Hansen; Chas Licciardello; Julian Morrow; Craig Reucassel; Chris Taylor; Charles Firth (until 2007)
- Country of origin: Australia
- No. of seasons: 3
- No. of episodes: 58 (list of episodes)

Production
- Executive producer: Julian Morrow
- Producers: Andy Nehl, Nathan Earl, Craig Melville, Mark Fitzgerald
- Running time: 26 minutes per episode

Original release
- Network: ABC1
- Release: 17 February 2006 – 29 July 2009

The Chaser's War on Everything is an Australian television satirical comedy series broadcast on the Australian Broadcasting Corporation (ABC) television station ABC1. It has won an Australian Film Institute Award for Best Television Comedy Series. The cast perform sketches mocking social and political issues, and often feature comedic publicity stunts. The series is produced by The Chaser, an Australian satirical group consisting of Chris Taylor, Julian Morrow, Craig Reucassel, Andrew Hansen, and Chas Licciardello. Fellow Chaser members Dominic Knight and Charles Firth are not part of the regular on-screen cast. Knight is a writer, and Firth compiled roving reports for the show from the United States, until he left the group to start a satirical newspaper in mid-2007.

The show premiered on 17 February 2006 and has since produced 58 episodes, broadcast over three seasons between 2006 and 2007 as well as during 2009. The first season was broadcast at a late timeslot on Friday nights. The second and third seasons were broadcast in a more favourable timeslot of Wednesdays at 9 pm. The show did not return in 2008, but returned on 27 May 2009 for the third season featuring ten episodes. The third season consisted of 8 episodes.

The stunts displayed on the show have often been controversial. For example, on 14 July 2006, Licciardello was charged (being later acquitted) after selling fake knives to Canterbury-Bankstown Bulldogs fans outside one of their rugby league games. Licciardello was again arrested, alongside Morrow and nine crew members, on 6 September 2007 after breaching security at the 2007 APEC summit.

The last episode of the series was aired on 29 July 2009, and rated an average national audience of 1.45 million.

== Origins ==
The entire team of The Chaser (from left, Morrow, Knight, Firth, Reucassel, Licciardello, Taylor, and Hansen) on The Chaser's War on Everything on 14 July 2006

The Chaser was formed by Dominic Knight, Charles Firth, Craig Reucassel, and Julian Morrow, and in 1999 ran a fortnightly newspaper entitled The Chaser. The group later added Chas Licciardello, Andrew Hansen, and Chris Taylor, to assist with its publication. Through the help of Andrew Denton, the Chaser team produced various shows for the Australian Broadcasting Corporation, most notably CNNNN. In 2005, The Chaser began filming a pilot for a new television series for the ABC, with the working title The Age of Terror Variety Hour. The Chaser team signed a contract with the ABC to produce 27 half-hour episodes for 2006, which would be based on news reviews, studio monologues and confrontations with politicians, celebrities, and business leaders. The show was to be presented by Morrow, Hansen, Reucassel, Taylor and Licciardello.

The ABC rejected the name The Age of Terror Variety Hour and other names including Thank Allah It's Friday. ABC did accept The Chaser is Right, although it was later rejected by Morrow, while the title Hey Hey, it's the Chaser was rejected after a pilot under that name was filmed in 2005. They eventually selected The Chaser's War on Everything as the title. The show was to be performed in front of a live audience, in a more relaxed format than CNNNN and other Chaser television productions.

== Release and popularity ==
=== Broadcast ===
The first season of The Chaser's War on Everything premiered on ABC1 on 17 February 2006 at 9:45 pm. The series aired late on Friday evenings where it developed a cult following, getting an average national audience of between 591,000 and 821,000 viewers each episode. The show broadcast two 'best of' shows in the mid-year. The last episode of the 2006 season was broadcast on 8 September 2006.

Due to its popularity, The Chaser's War on Everything's timeslot changed to Wednesday 9 pm for the 2007 season. In the lead-up to the second season, The Chaser team produced a live webcast of people counting down to the first episode of the season. New segments had been developed and the opening sequence was reworked. After the move to prime time the ratings increased to almost 1.5 million viewers each week. This was despite direct competition with well-rated programs on commercial networks. The Chaser finished their 24th and final episode of the show for the 2007 season on 14 November 2007. They then produced The Chaser Decides for the remaining two episodes of the 26-episode production, based on the 2007 Australian federal election.

After the controversial APEC motorcade stunt, the show's profile was greatly increased and international broadcasts expanded. Countries which broadcast the show include Finland, Israel, New Zealand, United Kingdom, Norway, Belgium, South Korea, and Poland.

After the last episode of The Chaser Decides, The Chaser ruled out doing any television productions in the first half of 2008. This included The Chaser's War on Everything, with the group opting to do a stage production of their antics around Australia, called The Chaser's Age of Terror Variety Hour.

Four Chaser's War on Everything DVDs from the first two seasons

The American cable network G4 acquired the rights to the program in the United States, and premiered it on 28 January 2009 at 9PM ET. The show then aired every Wednesday night at 11PM ET within the network's international block of programming called Duty Free TV. Ads of the program have capitalised on its controversial nature in Australia, with the tagline "Do you know what it takes to be controversial in Australia?"

Similarly, in the United Kingdom, BBC Four was airing six compilation episodes, taking sketches and highlights from the first two series from 23 June 2009.

A third season of The Chaser's War on Everything began airing on 27 May 2009, returning to its timeslot of Wednesday at 9:00pm on ABC1. The third series consists of only 10 episodes and is the final series of the program.

The final episode was broadcast on ABC1 on 29 July 2009.

The entire catalogue of the Chaser's War on Everything was secured by the Comedy Channel Programming Director Darren Chau in 2009 and premiered on 3 December 2009 as part of the channel's Biggest Thursday Ever.

=== DVD release ===
The first 13 episodes of the first season were released on DVD on 17 August 2006. The release included commentary by The Chaser and the show's crew. Bonus features and unaired scenes were also included.

The second DVD for the first season contained the latter thirteen episodes. It was in the same format of the first DVD, containing commentary and unaired scenes, and was released on 1 November 2006. The first thirteen episodes of the second season were released on DVD on 14 August 2007, with similar features to the two prior releases.

The second DVD set for the later half of the second season was released on 7 August 2008. It contains similar features to the previous DVD releases.

The third and last season was released on DVD on 5 November 2009.

=== Vodcast ===
On 27 July 2006, the ABC announced that entire episodes of The Chaser's War on Everything, along with jtv, would be made available for download via a vodcasting system. Just 45 days after appearing on the Australian iTunes podcasting directory, the show took the number one position. The last four episodes of the first season averaged approximately 175,000 viewers of the vodcast, and 25,000 downloads, which ABC stated was a success.

The episodes of the second series of The Chaser's War on Everything were the most popular downloaded vodcasts in 2007. Almost nine million vodcasts were downloaded, more than half of the ABC's online vodcasts served in the year.

Season one of The War on Everything is now also available for purchase and download from the iTunes Store in Australia and is one of the first TV shows the Australian Broadcasting Corporation added to iTunes.

== Show format ==
- Credits – The opening credits show the five starring members of the show, but through that there are images of notable politicians and celebrities which are targeted in the titles. The titles are always the same except for two changeable titles, which targets persons in recent events. The closing credits simply read all the cast and crew of the show, though commonly a video is played over half the credits, which is explained in the Conclusion. The closing credits are a frequent (if bizarre) source of humour. For example, Andrew Hansen once sang a song during the credits about how the credits are always played over his song. Another time the credits were shown in Ukrainian. On one episode the credits of the show were replaced with the credits of The New Inventors. In another episode from Season 3, Chas Licciardello, who in a sketch had changed his name to Gvhftr Kijl, was credited as such in the closing credits for that episode, and in the opening credits of the following episode.
- Introduction – Each episode begins with Reucassel and Taylor opening the show. The pair discuss the major recent events, present their opinions, and often show a pre-produced stunt or sketch.
- Andrew Hansen's hair – Each episode starting from the last episode of season 1, member Andrew Hansen changes his hair weekly for the show (e.g. Mohawks, coloured hair and at one instance, a small clock)
- Name changes – During season 2, the credits of names as displayed during the program have been replaced in various manners. Normally they were changed to people in recent events or a simple addition to the name. Examples included "Julian bin Morrow" and "Posh Chaser" and even the translation of the boys names in Arabic.
- Dialogues – In almost every episode, the Chaser members discuss a various recent event or generalised stunt. Most of these dialogues lead to a pre-produced stunt, ad or trailer. Most of this material doesn't fall into one of the various Segments, where most of their recurring material is shown. In the first season, Monologues were also common.
- Old Woman – As a running gag during Season 3, a photo of an old woman with a trolley would appear during sketches. Originally appeared during a stunt during Season 2, during an Ad Road Test for Riva Coffee, the footage subsequently placed occasionally in segments during Season 3. After the final episode was broadcast, she came in contact with The Chaser and requested her image be removed from future broadcasts. Images of Dom Knight now appear as such in the DVD of Season 3.
- ABC Complainer (Dear ABC) – This segment began in the third season. After one of the sketches, Andrew Hansen, dressed as his persona Philip Harley, writes an angry letter to the ABC with a typewriter. The letter always begins with the phrase "Dear ABC", followed by a complaint about the latest sketch. Harley then presents his (usually biased) opinion, and concludes with "What a waste of taxpayer's money! Philip Harley, Adelaide." Harley appeared four times in episode 5 – the highest to date.
- Conclusion – To end each episode the whole team gathers together, with one of the group members saying the closing joke. In Season 3, Taylor would also read a humorous Webpoll for their site.

=== Primary segments ===
The primary segments form the backbone of the show. These segments normally focus on key issues in a range of topics. They are generally presented by the cast members, live in front of the audience, and may be accompanied with pre-produced stunts and sketches relating to the topics.

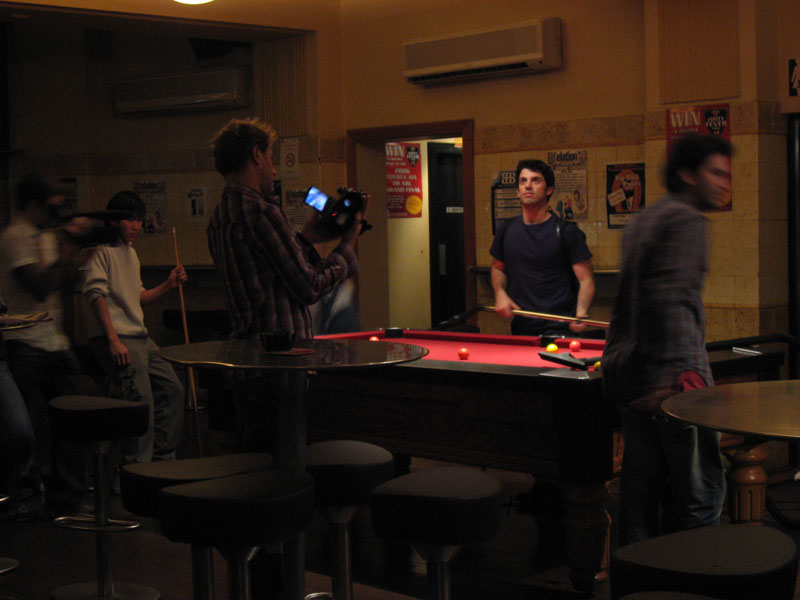
Chaser member Chas Licciardello along with Chris Taylor (right) and ABC crew, doing an Ad Road-Test on Godfrey's vacuum cleaners

- "What Have We Learned from Current Affairs This Week?" – Presented by Hansen and Licciardello, the segment pokes fun at the sensationalism used in competing weeknight current affairs programs Today Tonight and A Current Affair. All segments feature a lesson on their reporting techniques, such as how to spot "dodgy" guys and how to identify the different types of "experts". Both shows are regularly criticised for their tendency to come to fast and inaccurate conclusions.
- "Firth in the USA" – Firth, now living in the United States, performs a stunt or conducts an interview, with obvious references to USA culture. Stunt examples include meeting Hillary Clinton to offer his services as her presidential intern (a satire of the Lewinsky scandal).
- "The Ad Road-Test" – The team recreate situations shown in television advertisements to see if they would work in real life. Examples include whether male cheerleaders can convince a random person to stop smoking.
- "In Other News ..." – A former segment, presented by Morrow and Reucassel, which focused on current news stories and events, and sometimes showed a pre-produced stunt related to the news item. This was the only segment to appear in every episode of Season One.

The following segments were introduced in Season Two.

- "The Fixers" – Seeming to replace "In Other News ...", Morrow and Reucassel examine problems in the community, and present their idea for a fix. This is usually accompanied by a pre-produced item.

=== Supporting segments ===
The supporting segments are usually pre-produced stunts and sketches, supplementing the primary segments of the show. They are generally much shorter in length.

- "Surprise Spruiker" – Hansen plays a shop "spruiker" who attempts to help various institutions having trouble selling a particular item or idea. The stunt usually concludes when he is ordered by security guards to switch off his speakers.
- "Scenes from the Life of the Crazy Warehouse Guy" – Hansen plays a stereotypical announcer from a warehouse television advertisement uses his unique speaking style in everyday situations, such as ordering McDonald's. Hansen originally performed the character that would become the Crazy Warehouse Guy in parodies of frantic rug warehouse commercials.
- "Pursuit Trivia" – Morrow tests the general knowledge of a politician or celebrity by asking a Trivial Pursuit question from a game card in his hand at an interview or press conference. Prominent in the first season though not in the second.
- "Mr Ten Questions" – Hansen poses as a journalist at a press conference and, when prompted, proceeds to ask ten questions without letting the interviewee speak until he has read out all ten. Questions can relate to the subject or be about completely obscure topics, such as Peru's industrial output and the makeup of the Czech Legislature.
- "A Message From Osama Bin Laden" / Subtitles – An existing video of the infamous terrorist Osama bin Laden is subbed with incorrect and humorous subtitles, often declaring a Jihad on various people for arbitrary irritations. Videos of Saddam Hussein, Abu Bakar Bashir and Kevin Rudd (Chinese speech) have also been used in a similar manner, but not as common.
- "Citizens' Infringement Officer" – Morrow pretends to be an officer and hands out fake fines to people for absurd reasons; such as "wanker" number plates, "low-strung pants", parking inspectors being annoying due to giving out fines themselves, inappropriate babies' names, and wearing clothes (including hats and shoes) at nude beaches.

The following segments were introduced in Season Two.

- "If Life Were A Musical" – Members of the cast go to the public, targeting a specific person in an everyday life scenario, and behave as though they are in a Broadway-esque musical. The segment is referred to as a "Taylor Hansen Morrow" production, a spoof of Metro-Goldwyn-Mayer.
- "Clive The Slightly-Too-Loud Commuter" – Hansen plays Clive, a man who travels on public transport and talks loudly on his mobile phone about very personal or taboo issues.

=== Occasional segments ===
These segments support the show, however do not feature prominently.

- "What Have We Learnt From History?" – In this segment Hansen, Taylor and Reucassel test whether people today have learnt a lesson from events in the past; for example the Trojan Horse.
- "Famous Face Off" – A former segment, presented by Hansen, in which two "masters" in a particular field competed to be the best in an endeavour such as tongue-twisting newsreading or sportscasting.
- "The 2:30 Report" – A former segment, presented by Licciardello and Morrow, which reviewed the worst of late-night television, including late night game shows such as Quizmania and early morning Christian programmes.

The following segments were introduced in Season Two.

- "The News According To Fox" – Licciardello and Hansen criticise the bias of the popular American Fox News Channel.
- "What You Missed on Cable" – Presented by Licciardello and Morrow, this segment highlights the oddities on pay television programs, and occasionally compares them to the bland programming on ABC1. Licciardello and Morrow pointed out that it was intended to replace the 2:30 Report segment from season one.
- "Anna Coren's Segue/Meaningless Gibberish of the Week" – Integrated into "What Have We Learnt from Current Affairs This Week?", this segment looks at either Coren's extremely complicated transitions between unrelated stories, or the strange and meaningless introductions she says on Today Tonight.
- "Nut Job of the Week" – Licciardello and Taylor take a look at the "special people in our society"; people who have "alternative views". For example, The Secret's theory on how to acquire your deepest desires by the law of attraction was examined.
- "Open Mic" – A segment, derived from a stunt from the first half of the second series, where Morrow goes to various businesses and uses their public address systems to make humorous community announcements or random statements.
- "Election Watch" – Licciardello and Taylor observe a certain topic in relation to the federal election. This segment was only seen in the weeks leading up to the 2007 federal election and often made reference to subjects not related to the election.
- "Middle East TV" – Licciardello and Taylor take a look at Middle Eastern television. This segment only appeared in season 3.

Traditional segments were incredibly rare in episodes of the third season, with no 'What Have We Learnt from Current Affairs This Week?' or 'Ad Road Test' segments, despite them being the most popular. An online blog written by the Chaser said they wanted to try new things and they thought they would just be repeating themselves.

=== Segments appearing once or twice ===
- "Say What?!" - In Season 1, Andrew Hansen did a short segment of a few photos that had swear words in them from other countries which involved food.
- "Rudd.I.Am song" - In Season 3, The Chaser did a music video on speeches from Kevin Rudd, like American celebrities did a song on Barack Obama's speech "Yes We Can".

=== Recurring material ===
- Stunts – A staple of the show, stunts can vary from confronting celebrities or politicians to testing staff reactions in shops and department stores. The stunts must be approved by the ABC Legal Department, to prevent breach of the law. In the 2007 DVD of the first half of the season, it is stated that the basic formula for the stunts is "go in, get our footage and get kicked out".
- Sketches – These include fake ads, longer mockumentaries or traditional comedy sketches.
- Songs – Hansen, or sometimes other members, perform songs with a humorous theme. The songs are usually written by Hansen, with Taylor providing lyrics for many songs.
- Television Advertisements – Throughout the series the team create satirical television advertisements, which either advertise a false item or mock existing ads.
- Movie Trailers – The team creates parody trailers for existing movies or new movie ideas.
- Vox Pop – One of the team members conduct vox pops with people on the street asking for their opinions.

== Controversies and well-known stunts ==
The Chaser have been regularly criticised by tabloids such as Today Tonight, A Current Affair and some talkback radio stations for displaying stunts and sketches that they claim are dangerous, unfunny, cruel, offensive and tasteless. Many of the pieces below have had significant news coverage and been the subject of debates and opinion pieces.

Julian Morrow's novelty cheque

On 8 February 2006, before the first episode of the show had screened, Morrow approached Australian Wheat Board executive Charles Stott with a fake novelty cheque made out to Saddam Hussein and asked Stott to sign it. Stott's lawyer said his client felt intimidated by the stunt and the footage of it was not shown in the first episode as scheduled for "legal reasons". In the first episode to go to air, Morrow responded by raising the point that Stott has done business with Saddam Hussein, a brutal dictator, yet he is intimidated by a novelty cheque. The footage of this stunt does appear as a bonus on the show's first DVD.

Chris Taylor on Sunrise

Taylor on Sunrise

On the ninth episode of the show, Taylor announced that he planned to break up with his partner of seven years, but he did not want to ask her "the usual boring way", but do "something special, something she'll remember". The segment shows several of Taylor's attempts to "pop the question", including hanging a sign over a freeway and "proposing" on a big screen at an outdoor festival. For the finale, Taylor introduces the interview of him on the morning television program Sunrise. In the interview, Taylor asks the hosts if he can send a quick message to his partner, proceeding to say "Jo, get the fuck out of my life. And if you don't get this fucking message right now, you never will." This finale from the segment was leaked onto the internet without the break-up plan and has been widely distributed online as a viral video. Many viewers believed the segment was actually real but Taylor admitted on national radio station Triple J that it was set up. It was actually filmed after Sunrise went to air, with Channel Seven editing on screen graphics with current news at the time for realism. The hosts of Sunrise admitted it was a set up and apologised. They did not know what Taylor was going to say because he only asked if he could do a bit for the show and as a result, their interaction with Taylor was unscripted, as well as their reaction to his profane message.

Chas Licciardello's Bulldogs incident

On 14 July 2006, Licciardello was charged with offensive conduct after attempting to sell fake Canterbury Bulldogs merchandise outside an NRL game. The merchandise included plastic knuckledusters and balaclavas in the Bulldogs' colours, and was supposed to satirise the anti-social and hooligan behaviour of some Bulldogs fans. Several Bulldogs fans took offence and as a result he was charged for offensive behaviour. On the broadcast following his arrest, Licciardello appeared onstage in handcuffs and within an iron cage. On that same episode, he apologised for his actions, stating he understood that the Bulldogs fans were offended because they prefer to use their fists. This statement was accompanied by footage of Bulldogs supporters assaulting an opposing team's supporters during a match. After appearing in court with Morrow, Licciardello pleaded not guilty and the matter was adjourned. On 23 January 2007, Licciardello was found not guilty of the offensive behaviour charge. He was interviewed after the case draped in an Australian flag, and said he would appeal "to the Supreme Court, to the High Court, to the UN, to the Jedi Council and the Snickometer." After being reminded he had won, he said "I didn't actually prepare any material for the off-chance that we won."

Craig Reucassel's axe stunt

On 2 August 2006, Reucassel responded to a news story about a private school student who had hugged then-prime minister John Howard while holding a screwdriver during one of the PM's morning walks. To test his security arrangements, Reucassel approached the prime minister during a morning walk and asked for a hug while holding a large plastic battle axe. Howard obliged, but a later approach while holding a running chainsaw was not so successful. Cut out from this segment was an unsuccessful attempt that took place between the axe and the chainsaw, in which Reucassel was holding a four-point-star mace.

Julian Morrow's ticket prank

On 16 August 2006, Morrow purchased two airline tickets on the airline Virgin Blue under the names "Al Kyder" and "Terry Wrist", checked in using the automated check-in at Sydney Airport, and then deliberately failed to show up for boarding, so that the names would be broadcast in a final boarding call over the public address system. The prank was acknowledged by Virgin Blue who criticised the use of taxpayer dollars in the "childish humour".

Craig Reucassel's speedos

On 19 March 2007, during a campaign appearance for the New South Wales State Election, the then opposition leader Peter Debnam was confronted by Reucassel wearing nothing but Speedos and a baseball cap, making fun of Debnam's campaign appearances in the swimwear. When TV cameras remained focused on Reucassel rather than Mr Debnam, he said, "Sorry, I'm not Peter Debnam, he's over there. Just because I'm wearing this doesn't mean I'm Peter Debnam". Reucassel stuck around for the press conference but failed to draw a response from the opposition leader, and was again ignored when he went to shake Mr Debnam's hand.

APEC prank and arrest

Imitation insecurity passes used by The Chaser to breach the APEC Australia 2007 restricted zone

During the APEC Leaders Summit in Sydney, on 6 September 2007, Morrow and Licciardello along with nine other production crew members were arrested after they drove a fake Canadian motorcade down Macquarie Street and successfully breached the APEC restricted zone. Police only realised that the motorcade was a hoax when Licciardello, dressed as Osama bin Laden, stepped out of the car replete with bonnet-mounted Canadian flag and complained in-character about not being invited.

Licciardello, Morrow and the nine others were immediately detained by the NSW Police, questioned and charged with entering a restricted area without special justification under the APEC Meeting (Police Powers) Act 2007. All were released on bail to appear in court on 4 October 2007; and subsequently ABC lawyers requested for all matters to be adjourned until 5 December 2007. If they were found guilty they could have faced a maximum penalty of six months' imprisonment, or up to two years if they were in possession of a "prohibited item". NSW Police Commissioner Andrew Scipione stated that the Chaser stars risked being targeted by snipers during the prank.

The stunt was planned and approved by ABC lawyers under the assumption that the motorcade would be stopped and discovered at the first security checkpoint. They managed to pass through two police security checkpoints, using a fake convoy of hired limousines. According to Licciardello, he "never intended to get that far" but played along with it to make their stunt better. The footage of the prank, which was seized by the police, was returned to the ABC and featured in their next episode the following week.

Despite condemnations by various public officials, the Sydney correspondent of the BBC reported that the Chaser team had become 'folk heroes' following the stunt. Indeed, Alexander Downer, the minister for foreign affairs, appeared amused when asked to comment.

Later on 7 September 2007, three members of the Chaser and their film crew were questioned and released over a follow-up stunt involving running near the protected APEC zone dressed in cardboard cars topped with Canadian flags. The following Chaser episode ended up giving The Chaser's War on Everything their highest-ever ratings for an episode, with 2.245 million viewers tuning in across Australia.

On 28 April 2008, the charges against all 11 were dropped by the New South Wales Director of Public Prosecutions (DPP) as it was considered that the police gave "tacit" permission for the group to enter the restricted zone by failing to identify the fake security badges. The ABC welcomed the dropping of the charges, with Morrow saying "I think it's just great that justice hasn't been done". The police were unapologetic for their actions.

"The Eulogy Song"

On 17 October 2007 episode, Hansen sang a song which satirised the lives of several deceased celebrities, including Peter Brock, Princess Diana, Donald Bradman, Steve Irwin, Stan Zemanek, Jeff Buckley, John Lennon, and Kerry Packer, expressing the view that people with flaws during life are often disproportionately hailed as "top blokes" after death. He also sang that mass murderer Martin Bryant would look a saint after death. The song, whose lyrics were written by Chris Taylor, became the target of significant media attention, with several radio and television personalities saying the song was in "bad taste", and both then prime minister John Howard and then opposition leader Kevin Rudd expressed negative views. A few days later, the team approached John Howard on his morning walk, dressed as rabbits, and sparked a reaction from the prime minister, with him saying: "You blokes are a lot funnier when you pick on someone who's alive".

A number of news programs reported that the ABC's switchboard was jammed with calls from "disgusted viewers" immediately following the show. It was later revealed that only six calls had been made that night about the show, three of them in a positive light. Although a number of complaints were received the next day, the ABC said that a large number were listeners of Neil Mitchell's radio show, and that, when asked, many said they hadn't seen the show. In response, Today Tonight claimed many more complaints would follow.

In response to the attention, Taylor defended his song, stating that it was a legitimate skit and that although the song mentioned recently deceased breast cancer victim Belinda Emmett, the rest of the cast pretending to cut off Hansen before he completed his verse was "making a joke about the inappropriateness of making a joke about Belinda Emmett." He also revealed it was a "watered-down" version of the song, which was previously performed twice on stage in his musical Dead Caesar.

Seven Network Injunction

On 14 November 2007, The Chaser made an attempt to poke fun at Today Tonight and the way that they re-enact procedures and events which they base their stories on. As they had done several times before, they infiltrated the Seven Network's news headquarters at Martin Place and asked for the Today Tonight presenter Anna Coren, where they came dressed as pretend cameos for the re-enactment segments. Within the headquarters, they were confronted by the staff of the building for alleged trespassing. Both Today Tonight and their rival A Current Affair broadcast reports of the stunt, the Today Tonight broadcast claiming that they had finally caught the Chaser red-handed. A Current Affair did a relatively lighter report on the incident, seeming to take side with the Chaser. Channel Seven got an injunction to stop The Chaser showing the segment, which The Chaser planned on challenging. In place of their planned stunt, they shot a "hasty and dubious" reenactment of it. Channel 7 boss David Leckie exclaimed in an outburst at waiting photographers outside Channel 7's offices that The Chaser were "... nothing but a bunch of tossers, they're fucking wankers". Morrow responded, "I interpret those comments as David making overtures to us. Calling us wankers and tossers must mean he wants [to hire] us."

Vatican Blimp Stunt

On 29 April 2009, Morrow, Reucassel and other members of The Chaser team were arrested after flying a small blimp outside St. Peter's Basilica. The blimp (which was remote controlled) had the phrase "Young boys inside, pull down if you want one" written on the side, referring to the history of sexual abuse within the Catholic Church. The Chaser team were arrested on the suspicion of breaching The Vatican's restricted airspace, although when they were released no charges were laid.

"Make a Realistic Wish Foundation" skit

On 3 June 2009 episode, Taylor and Hansen were involved in a skit which was set in a terminally ill children's ward of a hospital, which centred around a spokesman (Taylor) portraying himself along with a doctor (Hansen), from the fictional "Make a Realistic Wish Foundation" (a spoof of the Make-a-Wish Foundation). The premise of the skit was that if the terminally ill children are only going to live for a few more months before dying, it is not worth spending money on lavish gifts for them. The one-minute-long sketch featured Taylor giving one girl a pencil case instead of a trip to Disneyland. Then along the same lines, Hansen gave another girl a stick instead of a meeting with Zac Efron. The skit concluded with Taylor stating "Why go to any trouble, when they're only gonna die anyway".

The publicised reaction to the sketch the next day from the general public and media commentators was almost universally negative. Among widespread reported disapproval from the public, especially from the families that the Make-a-Wish Foundation has helped, prime minister Kevin Rudd stated that The Chaser team "should hang their heads in shame". He went on to say that "I didn't see that but it's been described to me ... But having a go at kids with a terminal illness is really beyond the pale, absolutely beyond the pale." That morning, the Chaser team along with the ABC managing director Mark Scott apologised for airing the skit, with Scott stating that "We have unreservedly apologised for airing that skit, ... It's very clear today from the reaction that it's caused considerable offence and distress, particularly to parents of children that are seriously ill ... I've spoken to Julian Morrow from The Chaser and my understanding is that certainly wasn't the intention of the script, but that's the consequences of it." The ABC will now change their procedures for reviewing episode content which gets broadcast. Scott continued, "We're going to look at those processes ... I mean we all know that The Chaser push the edges and it's a tightrope that we walk, and I suppose there are many, many skits that they've put to air that have offended someone along the way – that's part of the nature of the satirical and black comedy that they do," The full episode was initially available for downloading or online viewing from the official website but was taken down while the skit was edited out of the episode, the edited version was then made available for download. The skit has also been cut from any further television airings and DVD releases. The ABC suspended The Chaser's War on Everything for two weeks. This was relayed via a message by The Chaser on their website, who stated that while they disagree with the decision to suspend the show, they apologise for making the skit, acknowledging that it went too far. When the show returned two weeks later, the controversy was referenced by the show being introduced as "The Chaser's Waste of Taxpayers' money", a reference to the fact that the show is on the government-funded ABC channel.

== Reception and impact ==
=== Current affairs programs ===
Current affairs programs, notably Channel 7's Today Tonight and Channel 9's A Current Affair, have run pieces critical of The Chaser team. A Current Affair ran segments covering rumours of the program moving to a commercial network, and the use of Osama bin Laden for humour, highlighting dangerous stunts and overstepping the mark.

Today Tonight ran segments demonstrating contrivances in Chaser's stunts and criticising their breakthrough of APEC's security. When Today Tonight asked if they could follow The Chaser team on one of their stunts, The Chaser agreed. The Chaser chose a stunt that would embarrass the Channel 7 television program. They did so by having a "Meakin Booze Bus"; in reference to Channel 7 boss Peter Meakin, who had recently been convicted of driving while under the influence of alcohol. In the shoot, The Chaser members repeatedly raised the topic of Peter Meakin to reporter James Thomas. It was revealed later that The Chaser did eventually answer enough of Thomas' questions so that Today Tonight received what they wanted, but Today Tonight did not end up running that footage. Channel 7 broadcast scenes that they judged made the Chaser crew look arrogant, although it was stated in The Chaser's season 2 DVD commentary that James Thomas later called The Chaser team and apologised for the way Today Tonight depicted them in the report. Channel 7 began airing repeats of The Chaser in September 2011.

=== Awards ===
In December 2006 The Chaser's War on Everything won an Australian Film Institute (AFI) Award for 'Best Television Comedy Series' and Hansen won an AFI Award for "Best Performance in a Television Comedy". Hansen also won the APRA / AGSC award for 'Best Television Theme' for his original theme on The Chaser's War on Everything.

In May 2007, the program was nominated for the TV Week Logie award "Most Outstanding Comedy Program" for the 2006 series. The show was nominated for the 2007 AFI award in the category of 'Best Television Comedy Series' for the 2007 series. In late February 2008, the show was nominated for the Rose D'Or international television award for Comedy.

In June 2008, The Chaser received the Atheist Foundation of Australia's Tom Paine Award for "Exemplary service to humanity", and "... outstanding promotion of ideals conducive to human contentment and survivability".

In 2010, the program was nominated for the TV Week Logie award "Most Outstanding Light Entertainment Program" for the 2009 series.

== See also ==
- The Chaser
- Mark Thomas
- Robert Newman
- The Yes Men
