= Susie Youssef =

Australian writer and actor

- Born: Sydney, New South Wales, Australia
- Notable work: Whose Line Is It Anyway? Australia; How Not to Behave; No Activity; Rosehaven

Comedy career
- Years active: 2006–present
- Medium: Stand-up comedian, writer, actor, improviser
- Genres: Sketch comedy, autobiographical comedy, improvisational comedy
- Website: www.susieyoussef.com

Susie Youssef is an Australian writer, actor and comedian who works in television, on radio and stage. She is best known for her appearances in the television series The Project, Whose Line Is It Anyway? Australia, and Rosehaven, and has performed stand-up comedy at various Australian and international festivals.

== Early life and education ==
Susie Youssef is the daughter of Lebanese immigrants. She grew up with five sisters and she often uses her family for comedy inspiration.

Youssef began comedy writing in high school, where she wrote her own plays. She began studying education, to become a teacher. A friend took her to an improvisational comedy show at the Enmore Theatre in Newtown in Sydney, which sparked a more serious interest in comedy.

She quit college and attended iO Chicago, in the United States, where she studied improvisational performance and comedy.

== Career ==
Youssef began her comedy career as a writer for The Ronnie Johns Half Hour in 2006, and made her acting debut in the short film Clicked in the role of Lina in 2011.

=== Stage ===
In 2014, Youssef played the lead role of Sarah in the Hayloft Project's stage play The Boat People.

She started performing improvisational comedy live, and later became a member of the Improv Theatre Sydney ensemble.

Youssef made her solo debut in her sketch comedy show Sketchual Chocolate at the Melbourne and Sydney Comedy Festivals. In 2015, she returned to the comedy festival circuit with her comedy show Owl Eyes On You and in 2016 made her debut in London and at the Edinburgh Festival Fringe with her stand-up show Check Youssef Before You Wreck Youssef. She has also performed at the Australian musical festival Homebake.

In 2017, Youssef toured with her comedy show Behave Youssef. In the same year, she hosted season two of the comedy TV series Stand and Deliver on ABC ME, which featured comedic acts from Australia and overseas.

In September–October 2018, she performed with the Sydney Theatre Company at the Sydney Opera House in Dario Fo's political comedy Accidental Death of an Anarchist. Later that year, she co-wrote and performed The Smallest Hour with writer and comedian Phil Spencer (Note: Bio note describes him as "writer, comedian, theatre-maker & creative producer".) at the Griffin in Sydney, a "comedy about broken dreams, second chances and velcro pants". in a sold-out season.

In February 2025 Youssef played MP Ruth Mandour in the State Theatre Company South Australia political satire Housework, written by Emily Steel and directed by Shannon Rush, with Emily Taheny playing her chief-of-staff. The play was well-reviewed, with Catherine Campbell, writing in The Conversation, calling it "a future Australian classic – a Housework is a future Australian classic – a Don's Party for our time".

=== TV appearances ===
In 2015, she appeared in other television series, including Community Kitchen, About Tonight, The Checkout and Game Night. She had recurring roles in the television comedy series How Not to Behave, Whose Line Is It Anyway? Australia, No Activity and Rosehaven, and a guest role in Here Come the Habibs in 2016.

She has also been a guest on The Project, All Star Family Feud, Celebrity Name Game, Have You Been Paying Attention?, and Hughesy, We Have a Problem.

In August 2024, the second 10-episode series of Julia Zemiro's Great Australian Walks launched, co-hosted by Youssef and Gina Chick owing to other commitments by Zemiro. Youssef covers walks in Victoria and South Australia.

Youssef will appear in the Australian adaptation of The Office, which is scheduled to premiere on Amazon Prime Video on 18 October 2024.

== Recognition ==
In 2014, Youssef won the Best on Stage award at the FBi SMAC Awards, for her role as Sarah in The Boat People.

In 2020, Youssef was selected as one of ten Australian comedians to compete for $100,000 on the experimental reality television series Last One Laughing Australia hosted by Rebel Wilson and screening on Amazon Prime in June.

== Stand-up comedy tours ==
Tours
Year	Title	Notes	Role
2014	Sketchual Chocolate	Debut solo stand-up show at the Melbourne and Sydney Comedy Festivals and Sydney Fringe Festival	Writer/performer
2015	Owl Eyes on You	Melbourne International Comedy Festival and Sydney Comedy Festival	Writer/performer
2016	Check Youssef Before You Wreck Youssef	Edinburgh Fringe, Melbourne International Comedy Festival, Sydney Comedy Festival and Brisbane Comedy Festival	Writer/performer
2017	Behave Youssef	Melbourne International Comedy Festival, Sydney Comedy Festival	Writer/performer

== Filmography ==
Film
Year	Title	Role	Notes
2011	Clicked	Lina	Actor
2014	Kevin Needs to Make New Friends: Because Everyone Hates Him for Some Reason	Jane	Actor
2016	Scare BNB	Ksenia	Actor
2018	The Call Back	Sam	Actor

=== Television appearances ===
Year	Title	Role	Notes
2006	The Ronnie Johns Half Hour	Writer	4 episodes
2015	Game Night	Player Number 3	1 episode
2015	We Live to Science Another Day	Susie	1 episode
2016	Here Come the Habibs	Marie	1 episode
2016	Miles Holbeck: The Member	Sophie	1 episode
2016	No Activity	Anousha	3 episodes
2016–2021	Rosehaven	Gez	10 episodes
2017	Get Krack!n	Egg Woman	1 episode
2018	Squinters	Simoni	6 episodes
2021	Making It Australia	Host	
2023	Deadloch	Aleyna Rahme	8 episodes
2024	The Office	Georgia	1 episode

=== Television self appearances ===
Year	Title	Role	Notes
2020	Last One Laughing	Herself	6 episodes
2019–present	The Project	Herself	
2018–2019	Hughesy, We Have a Problem	Herself	5 episodes
2019	Celebrity Name Game	Herself	5 episodes
2017	Screen Time	Herself	1 episode
2017	All Star Family Feud	Herself	1 episode
2017–2019	Have You Been Paying Attention?	Herself	11 episodes
2016–2017	Whose Line Is It Anyway? Australia	Herself	5 episodes
2016–2017	Comedy Up Late	Herself	11 episodes
2015	How Not to Behave	Herself	15 episodes
2015	The Chaser's Media Circus	Herself	1 episode
2015	Community Kitchen	Herself	2 episodes
2015	About Tonight	Herself	2 episodes
2015	The Checkout	Herself	1 episode

== Theatre ==
Theatre
Year	Title	Role	Notes
2014	The Boat People	Sarah	Hayloft Project (Best on Stage, FBi SMAC Awards)
2020	Home, I'm Darling	Fran	Southbank Theatre, Melbourne
