= Animal Vehicle =

Studio album by the Axis of Awesome
- Released: 12 July 2011
- Recorded: 2010–2011
- Genre: Comedy rock
- Length: 47:55
- Label: The Axis of Awesome

The Axis of Awesome chronology
Infinity Rock Explosion! (2010)	Animal Vehicle (2011)	The Swimsuit Area (2012)

Animal Vehicle is the third studio album by Australian comedy band the Axis of Awesome, released on 12 July 2011.

== Track listing ==
All tracks are written by Jordan Raskopoulos, Lee Naimo and Benny Davis

No.	Title	Length
1.	"The Glorious Epic of Three Men Who Are Awesome"	4:19
2.	"How to Write a Love Song"	4:05
3.	"Can You Hear the Fucking Music Coming Out of My Car?"	2:19
4.	"Birdplane"	2:51
5.	"When Life Is Good"	1:25
6.	"Songs to Sing Along To"	2:30
7.	"The Language of Love"	3:22
8.	"Skeleton Man"	2:32
9.	"Serious"	1:45
10.	"Harry Potter and the Drunk Teenage Animals Escaping from Zoos"	3:36
11.	"Inspiration"	1:00
12.	"W.W.J.D.?"	3:34
13.	"Sexual Harassment"	2:12
14.	"Song for the Elderly"	3:12
15.	"Ode to KFC"	1:54
16.	"4 Chords"	5:48
17.	"El Pajaro Avion"	1:30
Total length:		47:55

== Personnel ==
- Jordan Raskopoulos – vocals
- Lee Naimo – guitar, vocals
- Benny Davis – keyboards, vocals
