= Scissors, Paper, Rock! =

Album by The Axis of Awesome

Studio album by the Axis of Awesome
- Released: 2 January 2008
- Recorded: 2007
- Genre: Comedy rock
- Label: The Axis of Awesome

The Axis of Awesome chronology
Scissors, Paper, Rock! (2008)	Infinity Rock Explosion! (2010)

Scissors, Paper, Rock! is the debut studio album by Australian comedy band the Axis of Awesome, released on 2 January 2008.

== Track listing ==
All tracks are written by Jordan Raskopoulos, Lee Naimo and Benny Davis

No.	Title	Length
1.	"Moderately Rock and Roll"	2:34
2.	"Hi"	0:10
3.	"How to No. 1"	1:16
4.	"LazyEye"	2:28
5.	"Birdplane"	2:42
6.	"Titty Bar"	2:21
7.	"Thirsty?"	0:42
8.	"Crime Solving Cowboy"	2:26
9.	"How to No. 2"	1:16
10.	"Sunkist"	1:18
11.	"Use By 97"	3:38
12.	"How to No. 3"	1:16
13.	"Awwww..."	0:26
14.	"Four Chords"	5:11
15.	"Election 07 Rap Battle"	3:04
16.	"It's Time to Go for Growth"	3:00
Total length:		33:48

== Personnel ==
- Jordan Raskopoulos – vocals
- Lee Naimo – guitar, vocals
- Benny Davis – keyboards, vocals
