= Karl Chandler =

Karl Chandler may refer to:

- Karl Chandler (American football)
- Karl Chandler (comedian)
