= Infinity Rock Explosion! =

Studio album by the Axis of Awesome
- Released: 12 February 2010
- Recorded: 2009–2010
- Genre: Comedy rock
- Length: 47:32
- Label: The Axis of Awesome

The Axis of Awesome chronology
Scissors, Paper, Rock! (2008)	Infinity Rock Explosion! (2010)	Animal Vehicle (2011)

Infinity Rock Explosion! is the second studio album by Australian comedy band the Axis of Awesome, released on 12 February 2010.

== Track listing ==
All tracks are written by Jordan Raskopoulos, Lee Naimo and Benny Davis

No.	Title	Length
1.	"Infinity Rock Explosion!"	1:07
2.	"The Glorious Epic of Three Men Who Are Awesome"	4:18
3.	"Surprise Song No. 1"	0:53
4.	"The Language of Love"	3:21
5.	"Birdplane"	2:51
6.	"Songs to Sing Along To"	2:30
7.	"Serious"	1:45
8.	"Harry Potter and the Drunk Teenage Animals Escaping from Zoos"	3:35
9.	"Surprise Song No. 2"	0:52
10.	"Living Worlds Apart"	3:57
11.	"Skeleton Man"	2:31
12.	"Wwjd?"	3:33
13.	"What Do You Do...?"	4:51
14.	"Inspiration"	1:00
15.	"Sexual Harassment"	2:10
16.	"Surprise Song No. 3"	1:13
17.	"Four Chords"	5:33
18.	"El Pajaro Avion"	1:32
Total length:		47:32

== Personnel ==
- Jordan Raskopoulos – vocals
- Lee Naimo – guitar, vocals
- Benny Davis – keyboards, vocals
