= Tegan Higginbotham =

Australian comedian, writer and actress

- Born: Tegan Marie Higginbotham; 1987 or 1988 (age 38–39); Melbourne, Victoria, Australia
- Education: Dandenong High School
- Notable work: Whovians
- Spouse: Paul Verhoeven

Comedy career
- Years active: 2005-present
- Medium: Writer, actor

Tegan Marie Higginbotham (born 1987 or 1988) is an Australian comedian, writer, and actress.

== Early life and education ==
Higginbotham, was born in 1987 or 1988 in Dandenong, Victoria. She attended Dandenong Primary School and Dandenong High School (since merged with Cleeland Secondary College).

Her first love was acting, until she discovered comedy in her late teens, and performed her first comedy gig at the age of 17.

== Career ==
=== Live performance ===
Higginbotham has performed at every Melbourne International Comedy Festival since becoming a National Finalist at the festival's Class Clowns comedy competition in 2005.

She began her comedy career performing wild fast-paced sketch shows with fellow comedians Rob Lloyd and Adam McKenzie as the trio 'The Hounds', which later morphed into 'Watson', without Lloyd.

At the age of 21, Higginbotham began performing solo with her debut comedy show Million Dollar Tegan – nominated for the Best Newcomer Award at the Melbourne International Comedy Festival in 2012.

=== TV and radio ===
In 2016, Higginbotham was a regular cast member for the Australian version of Whose Line Is It Anyway?.

Higginbotham co-hosted the controversial ABC2 pre-game, half-time and post-game coverages of the Liverpool F.C versus Sydney FC match with Julian Schiller and Steen Raskopoulos on 24 May 2017.

She joined Nicole Livingstone and Amberley Lobo as co-host and regular panellist on the one-hour live entertainment and sports comedy panel show called Sideliners which premiered on ABC TV on 30 June 2017.

In March 2024, Higginbotham joined Triple M's Marty Sheargold Show as executive producer, replacing Matt Thomson.

=== Writing ===
Higginbotham contributes regularly as a sports columnist for The Age and writes a blog.

== Awards ==
Year	Work	Award	Category	Result
2012	Million Dollar Tegan	Melbourne International Comedy Festival	Best Newcomer	Nominated
2012	Shakespeare Fight Club	Melbourne International Comedy Festival	Golden Gibbo Award (with ensemble 'Watson')	Nominated
2014	This is Littleton	AWGIE Awards	Best Comedy: Sketch or Light Entertainment (shared with ensemble of writers)	Nominated
2014	Who's Afraid of the Dark?	Melbourne International Comedy Festival	Best Comedy Award (with ensemble 'Watson')	Won
2015	Who's Afraid of the Dark?	Melbourne International Comedy Festival	Golden Gibbo Award (with ensemble 'Watson')	Nominated

== Community and charity work ==
Higginbotham performed at the Heart of St Kilda concert in 2014 with comedians Julia Morris, Charlie Pickering, musical comedy trio Tripod, ventriloquist Dean Atkinson, Greg Champion of the Coodabeens, and comedy character Elliot Goblet, to raise funds for Sacred Heart Mission, which assists hundreds of people who are homeless or living in poverty to find shelter, food, care and support every day of the year.

== Personal life ==
Higginbotham loves sports and sci-fi. and describes herself as "a big nerd at heart, whose favourite things ever are Star Wars and Harry Potter."

She married Paul Verhoeven in a civil ceremony in Paris in July 2019.

== Live comedy shows ==
=== Solo comedy shows ===
- 2012: Million Dollar Tegan
- 2013: Touched By Fev
- 2014: Game Changer
- 2016: The City of Love

=== Collaborative comedy shows ===
- 2006–2007: The Hound of the Baskervilles
- 2007: Every Film Ever Made
- 2008–2009: The Last Bucket of Water
- 2010: Robot V's World
- 2010: Jabba's Comedy Hutt
- 2011: The Terminativity
- 2011: Super Secret Awesome Show
- 2012: Shakespeare Fight Club
- 2014: The Wrestling
- 2015: Who's Afraid of the Dark?
- 2016: The Life Education Van for Adults!
- 2017: Go to Hell
- 2018: Watson World Tour

== Filmography ==
=== Film ===
Year	Title	Role	Notes
2009	Perspective	Darcy	Short film
2013	Adoption	Tilly	Short film
2014	Dinner for Three	Cass	Short film
2014	The Heckler	Laura	Feature film
2015	Sweatshop	Ashlee Simmons	Short TV movie
2015	Holding the Man	Gina	Feature film
2015	Oddball	Zoe	Feature film
2015	A Night of Horror: Volume 1	Maggie	Anthology film
2018	For Your Sins	Lucy	Short film
2020	The Divorce	Lawyer	Short film
2023	Jones Family Christmas	McKenzie	TV movie

=== Television ===
Year	Title	Role	Notes
2007	Neighbours	Francis Taylor	1 episode
2008	Studio A	Comedian	1 episode
2009	Whatever Happened to That Guy?	Tegan	Season 1, 4 episodes
2009	City Homicide	Jana Mellor	Season 3, episode 14: "Mission Statement"
2011	The Bazura Project	Barmaid / Profane Shopper	Season 4, 2 episodes
2012	Rant	Reporter	1 episode
2012	Aunty Donna's Rumpus Room	Tammy	Season 1, episode 2: "Chapel Street/Cresps/A Bad Date"
2013	Twentysomething	Applicant 1	Season 2, episode 2: "Tricks of the Trade"
2013–2015	Have You Been Paying Attention?	Panelist	4 episodes
2014	Back Seat Drivers	Driver	1 episode
2014	This is Littleton	Various characters	Season 1, 4 episodes
2014	Fancy Boy	Addiction Counsellor	Season 1, episode 1: "My Weird Addiction"
2014	It's a Date	Abby	Season 2, episode 4: "How Much Research Should You Do Before Dating?"
2014	Upper Middle Bogan	Jess	Season 2, episode 8: "Jules in the Crown"
2014	The 2014 Antenna Awards	Host	1 episode
2014	Live on Bowen	Comedian	1 episode
2014	Spicks and Specks	Panelist	2 episodes
2015	Community Kitchen	Herself	2 episodes
2015	Comedy Up Late	Comedian	1 episode
2015	About Tonight	Host	1 episode
2015	How to be Funny	Herself	1 episode
2016	Molly	Petra	Miniseries, 2 episodes
2016	Bounce	Herself	2 episodes
2016–2018	Nowhere Boys: Two Moons Rising	Quinn Banda	Seasons 3–4, 5 episodes
2016–2017	Whose Line is it Anyway? Australia	Herself	4 episodes
2017	Whovians	Presenter / Panellist	9 episodes
2017	Liverpool FC versus Sydney FC	Host	1 episode
2017	Sideliners	Co-host / Regular panellist	7 episodes
2017	The Ex-PM	Floor Manager	Season 2, episode 3: "Image"
2018	Show Me the Movie!	Herself	2 episodes
2019	Help – The Series	Lucie	Miniseries
2021	Dish Island	Host	

=== As writer ===
Year	Title	Role	Notes
2014	This is Littleton	Writer	Season 1, 4 episodes
2014	The 2014 Antenna Awards	Writer	1 episode
2014	Dinner for Three	Co-writer / Associate Producer	Short film
2015	Little Lunch	Writer	1 episode
2015	Open Slather	Writer	9 episodes
2023	Jones Family Christmas	Writer	TV movie

=== Podcast series ===
Year	Title	Role	Notes
2016	Night Terrace	Jillemina	1 episode: "Situational Awareness"
