= Studio A =

- Presented by: Dave Thornton (Host; 2008–2009); Tommy Little (Host; 2010–2011)
- Country of origin: Australia
- Original language: English
- No. of seasons: 6

Production
- Production locations: RMIT University; Melbourne, Australia
- Running time: Approx. 60 min. (Including Commercials)
- Production company: RMITV (Student Community Television Inc.)

Original release
- Network: C31 Melbourne

Studio A is an hour-long live variety, comedy and sketch program produced as the RMITV Flagship production between 2008–2011 and was hosted by Dave Thornton and then later Tommy Little. Supporting cast included many up and coming comedians and media personalities including Jess Harris (Twentysomething), Alison Bice, Karl Chandler, Tom Ballard, Tommy Dassalo, Oliver Clarke, Xavier Michaelidies, Tegan Higginbotham, Nick Cody, Nat Harris, Anne Edmonds, Ted Wilson, Luke McGregor and John Campbell. The show featured weekly celebrity guests and an array of Melbourne's up and coming talent. Guests included Peter Helliar, Colin Lane, Wayne Hope, Rove McManus, Adam Richard.

== Awards ==
Studio A took out two 2009 Antenna Awards for Outstanding Program of the Year and Outstanding Exterior Broadcast Program.

== Rebranding of the RMITV Flagship ==
After Season 6, RMITV stated in a press release that they would be making changes to their Flagship Production in 2012 and announced that Live on Bowen would be the show's successor. The press release stated that all current cast members of Studio A cast were welcome to audition but according to an article published on comedy.com.au, when asked if he would consider auditioning Little laughed at the idea.

== Cast ==
Presenter	Role	Tenure
Dave Thornton	Host	2008–2009
Tommy Little	Host	2010–2011
Jess Harris	Supporting cast	2008–
Alison Bice	Supporting cast	2008–
Karl Chandler	Supporting cast	2008–2011
Tom Ballard	Supporting cast	
Tommy Dassalo	Supporting cast	2008–2009
Xavier Michaelidies	Supporting cast	2010–2011
Oliver Clarke	Supporting cast	2008–?
Tegan Higginbotham	Supporting cast	2010–2011
Nick Cody	Supporting cast	2010–2011
Nat Harris	Supporting cast	2011
Anne Edmonds	Supporting cast	2011
Ted Wilson	Supporting cast	2011
Luke McGregor	Supporting cast	2010–2011
John Campbell	Supporting cast	2010–2011
