= Steen Raskopoulos =

Australian comedian, actor and improviser

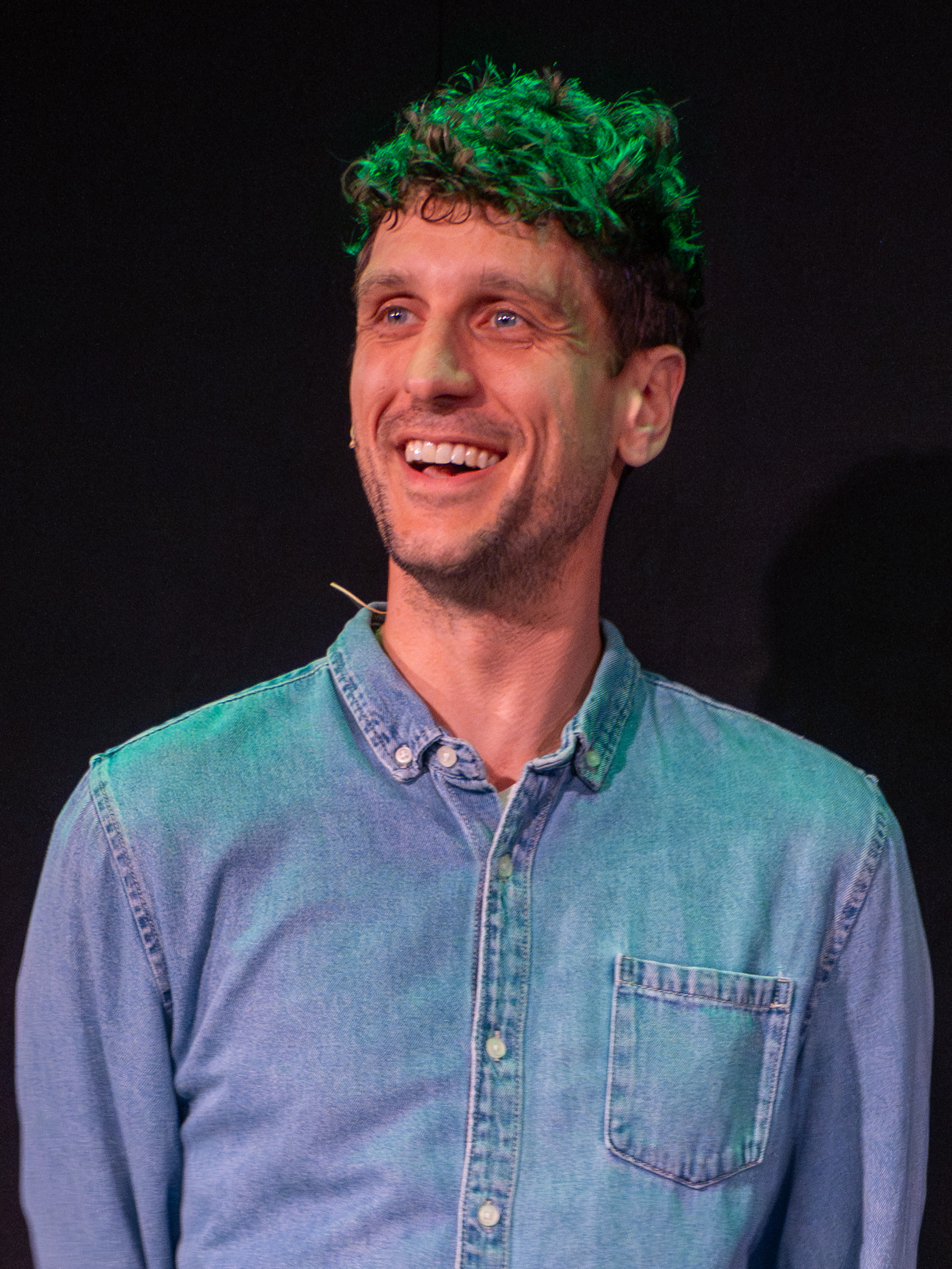
- Raskopoulos in 2025
- Born: Steen Raskopoulos; 3 July 1987 (age 39); Sydney, Australia
- Occupations: Comedian, actor, improviser
- Known for: The Duchess; Top Coppers
- Spouse: Sara Pascoe (m. 2020)
- Children: 2
- Father: Peter Raskopoulos
- Relatives: Jordan Raskopoulos (sister)

Steen Raskopoulos (born 3 July 1987) is an Australian comedian, actor and improviser. He is best known for his live character solo sketch shows, playing Nick Fletcher in The Office (Australia), playing Dr. Evan in The Duchess (Netflix), Pete Lewis in Feel Good (Netflix), John Mahogany in BBC Three's Top Coppers, Whose Line Is It Anyway? Australia and as one half of the award-winning improvisation duo The Bear Pack.

== Early life and education ==
Raskopoulos was born in Sydney. His father is FFA Hall of Fame footballer Peter Raskopoulos, and his sister is comedian and singer Jordan Raskopoulos. He studied at the University of Sydney where he first started improvising and performed Theatresports at Manning Bar. He is the co-founder of Improv Theatre Sydney.

== Live comedy career ==
Raskopoulos debuted his first solo sketch show, Bruce springSTEEN LIVE IN CONCERT, at the 2013 Melbourne International Comedy Festival. He was nominated for Best Newcomer, and he won the same award at the Sydney Comedy Festival later that year. In 2014, he returned with a new show, I'm Wearing Two Suits Because I Mean Business. He sold out his seasons in Melbourne, Sydney, London and Edinburgh and was nominated for the Fosters Comedy Awards Best Newcomer at the Edinburgh Fringe Festival. Character Assassin earned him a Barry Award nomination for best show at the Melbourne International Comedy Festival. He won the Directors Choice award at the 2018 Sydney Comedy Festival for his solo sketch show 'Stay'. Raskopoulos is also the youngest Theatresports National Champion of Australia, winning the title in 2008 with Simon Greiner and two members from The Axis of Awesome, Jordan Raskopoulos and Lee Naimo.

== Television career ==
Raskopoulos has starred on the sketch show This is Littleton (ABC), SlideShow (Channel 7), Legally Brown (SBS), It's a Date (ABC), The Code (ABC), Utopia (ABC), True Story with Hamish & Andy (Nine) Whose Line Is It Anyway? Australia (Comedy Channel), Squinters (ABC), Feel Good (Netflix), The Duchess (Netflix) and Out of Her Mind (BBC 1) and was lead in the BBC Three sitcom Top Coppers. His most recent TV role was in The Office (Australia) on Amazon Prime, where he played Nick Fletcher.

== Personal life ==
Raskopoulos has been married to the British comedian Sara Pascoe since 2020. The couple have two sons, Theodore, born in February 2022, and Albie, born in October 2023.

== Filmography ==
=== Film ===
Film
Year	Title	Role	Notes
2014	The Polygamist	Steve	Short film
2014	Twisted	The Guy	Short film Credited as Steen Raskopoulous
2015	Holding the Man	Older Paul Caleo	
2017	The Record: World's Largest Biological Family	Frank Belami	Short film Writer

=== Television ===
Television
Year	Title	Role	Notes
2005	The Ronnie Johns Half Hour	N/A	Writer - Episode #1.6
2014	This Is Littleton	Various	Writer; 4 episodes
2014	The Code	Edan	4 episodes
2014	It's a Date	Juzzy	Season 2, episode 4: "How Much Research Should You Do Before Dating?"
2015	Fresh Blood	Various	Writer; Season 1, episode 4: "The Record"
2015	Utopia	Ethan	Also known as Dreamland; Season 2, episode 6: "Starting the Conversation"
2015	Top Coppers	John Mahogany	6 episodes
2016	Halloween Comedy Shorts	Elliott	Writer; Season 1, episode 2: "Steen Raskopoulos's Horror: Scare BnB"
2016-2017	Whose Line Is It Anyway? Australia	Himself	10 episodes
2017	True Story with Hamish & Andy	Nurse Craig	Season 1, episode 3: "Sammie's Fainting Story"
2018	Squinters	Ned	6 episodes
2020	At Home Alone Together	Personal Trainer Nic / Nick	2 episodes - 1 episode credit only Writer - 2 episodes
2020	The Duchess	Evan	6 episodes
2020	Out of Her Mind	Imaginary Brother	Episode 6: "The Beautiful Garden"
2020-2021	Feel Good	Pete Lewis	6 episodes
2021	Grave New World		Miniseries; Episode 3: "Theme Parks, Exercise, Fizzy Drinks"
2021	The Moth Effect	Open Mic Cop	Episode 6: "Have you heard of the White Ant?"
2021	The Emily Atack Show		3 episodes
2024	The Office (Australia)	Nick Fletcher	Main role

=== Video games ===
Video games
Year	Title	Role	Notes
2020	Bleeding Edge	Makutu	Voice

== Awards and nominations ==
- 2008 National Theatresports Champion
- 2013 Best Newcomer Sydney Comedy Festival
- 2013 Best Newcomer Nomination Melbourne International Comedy Festival
- 2014 Best Newcomer Nomination Edinburgh Fringe Festival
- 2014 Sydney Fringe Laughs Award (The Bear Pack)
- 2014 Australian Writers Guild Comedy - Sketch or Light Entertainment This Is Littleton (2014)
- 2015 Best Newcomer Nomination Chortle Awards
- 2015 Best Character/Sketch Nomination Chortle Awards
- 2015 Barry Award Nomination Melbourne International Comedy Festival
- 2018 Directors Choice Award Sydney Comedy Festival
