= Nicole Livingstone =

Australian swimmer

Nicole Livingstone AO
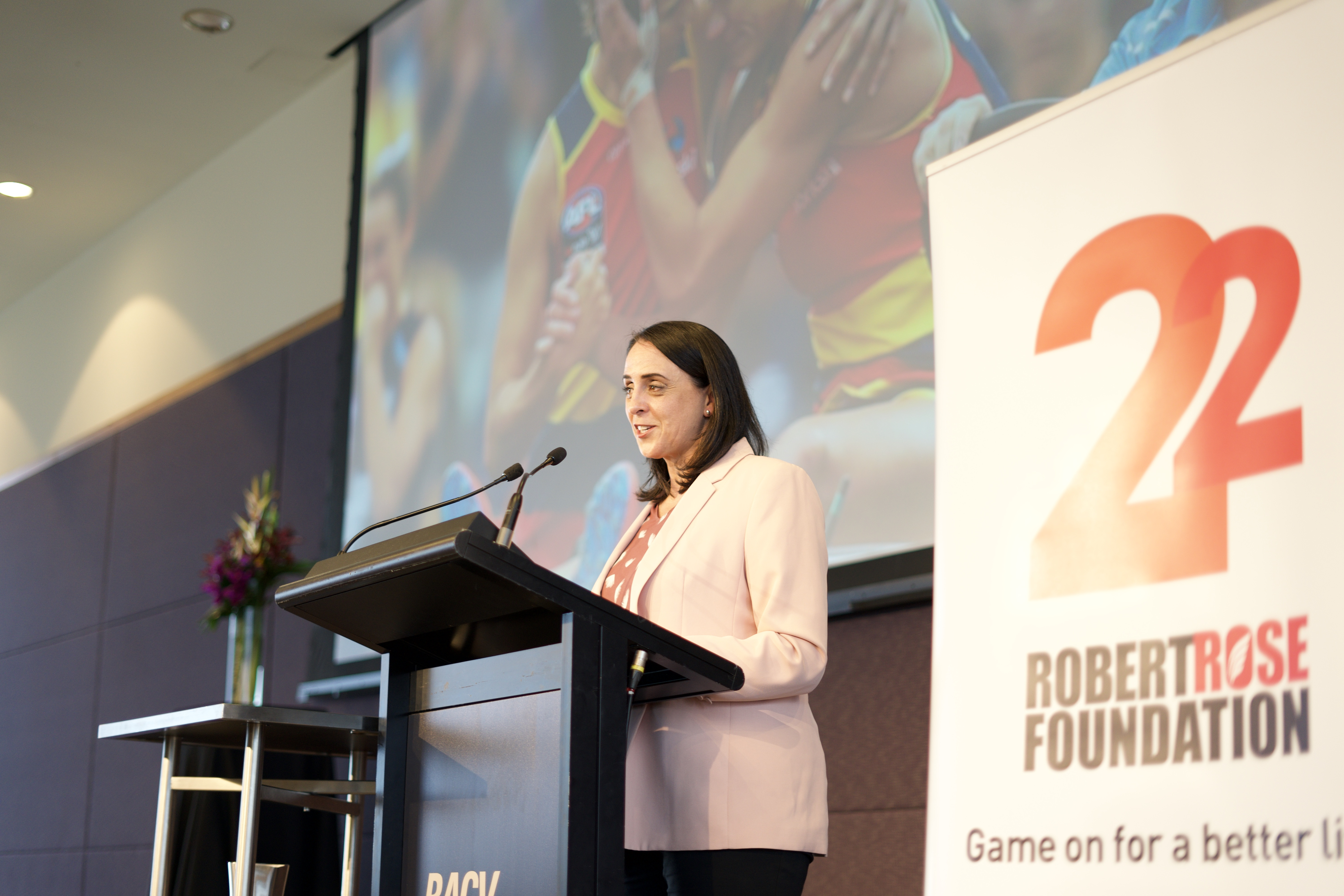
- Livingstone delivers the 17th Bob Rose Lecture, August 2019.

Personal information
- Full name: Nicole Dawn Livingstone
- National team: Australia
- Born: 24 June 1971 (age 55) Melbourne, Victoria, Australia
- Height: 1.74 m (5 ft 9 in)
- Weight: 65 kg (143 lb)

Sport
- Sport: Swimming
- Strokes: Backstroke
- Club: Melbourne Vicentre
Medal record
Women's swimming
Representing Australia
Olympic Games
Silver medal – second place	1996 Atlanta	4×100 m medley
Bronze medal – third place	1992 Barcelona	200 m backstroke
Bronze medal – third place	1996 Atlanta	4×200 m freestyle
World Championships (LC)
Silver medal – second place	1991 Perth	4×100 m medley
World Championships (SC)
Bronze medal – third place	1995 Rio	4×200 m freestyle
Pan Pacific Championships
Gold medal – first place	1987 Brisbane	100 m backstroke
Gold medal – first place	1987 Brisbane	200 m backstroke
Gold medal – first place	1995 Atlanta	200 m backstroke
Gold medal – first place	1995 Atlanta	4×100 m medley
Silver medal – second place	1989 Tokyo	100 m backstroke
Silver medal – second place	1989 Tokyo	4×100 m medley
Silver medal – second place	1991 Edmonton	100 m backstroke
Silver medal – second place	1991 Edmonton	200 m backstroke
Silver medal – second place	1991 Edmonton	4×100 m medley
Silver medal – second place	1993 Kobe	4×100 m medley
Silver medal – second place	1995 Atlanta	100 m backstroke
Bronze medal – third place	1989 Tokyo	200 m backstroke
Bronze medal – third place	1991 Edmonton	4×100 m freestyle
Bronze medal – third place	1991 Edmonton	4×200 m freestyle
Commonwealth Games
Gold medal – first place	1990 Auckland	100 m backstroke
Gold medal – first place	1990 Auckland	4x100 m medley
Gold medal – first place	1994 Victoria	100 m backstroke
Gold medal – first place	1994 Victoria	200 m backstroke
Gold medal – first place	1994 Victoria	4x100 m medley
Gold medal – first place	1994 Victoria	4x200 m freestyle
Silver medal – second place	1990 Auckland	200 m backstroke
Silver medal – second place	1994 Victoria	200 m freestyle
Bronze medal – third place	1986 Edinburgh	100 m backstroke

Nicole Dawn Livingstone, AO (born 24 June 1971) is an Australian former competitive swimmer. Since retiring from swimming Livingstone has had careers as a television sports commentator and media presenter and as a sports administrator. She was known for a period as Nicole Stevenson, when she was married to Australian cyclist Clayton Stevenson.

== Early life ==
Livingstone grew up in Melbourne and started swimming at 9. She attended Parkdale Secondary College.

Her mother worked at Metropolitan Golf Club and her father at Carlton & United Breweries.

She had an older brother, Gary and older sister, Karen.

== Swimming career ==
Livingstone competed for Australia in three summer Olympics - 1988, 1992, and 1996 - winning both individual and team medals. She was an Australian Institute of Sport scholarship holder.

She held the Australian record for the 200-metre backstroke, with at time of 2:10.20, set on 31 July 1992 at the 1992 Summer Olympics in Barcelona, Spain for 16 years. Meagen Nay broke the Australian record twice at the 2008 Australian Olympic Trials. She is the only Australian swimmer to have competed in six successive Pan Pacific Swimming Championships. Livingstone's coaches included Bill Nelson at Melbourne Vicentre and Gennadi Touretski.

=== Notable races ===
- 1991 World Aquatics Championships (Perth), 4x100 medley relay, 2nd place Australia (with Linley Frame, Susie O'Neill, Karen Van Wirdum)
- 1992, 200 m backstroke, set world short course record, Melbourne.
- 1992 Summer Olympics, 200 m backstroke, Bronze medal.
- 1996 Summer Olympics, 4 × 200 m freestyle relay, Bronze medal (with Julia Greville, Emma Johnson, Susan O'Neill)
- 1996 Summer Olympics, 4 × 100 m medley relay, Silver medal (with Samantha Riley, Susan O'Neill, Sarah Ryan)

== Media career ==
Upon retiring from swimming following the 1996 Olympics, Livingstone began commentating on the surf lifesaving and swimming on the Nine Network.

While at Nine she also had the role of host of Nine's Wide World of Sport, Sports Saturday and Any Given Sunday with Mick Molloy in 2006.

When the swimming coverage moved to Network 10 in 2009, Livingstone moved stations.

In 2017 Livingstone co-hosted Sideliners with Tegan Higginbotham on the ABC which was looking to put a female lens on sport.

Livingstone has also been a sports presenter on Nine News PM Edition and a fill in presenter on Network Ten's Sports Tonight.

Since her retirement, Livingstone has travelled to all six Summer Olympics and at the Commonwealth Games as a commentator for the swimming coverage.

Nicole has worked for Amazon Prime Video in 2021 and 2022 commentating on the Australian Swimming Championships.

She has also been a presenter for Melbourne station SEN 1116 and appeared on a number of programs including The Project and Q+A.

== Business and administrative roles ==
=== Sporting roles ===
Livingstone has worked on multiple boards for various sporting bodies, including Swimming Australia, the Australian Sports Drug Agency, the Victorian Olympic Council, and the Victorian Institute of Sport.

Livingstone was elected to the board of the Australian Olympic Committee in 2013. In 2017, she backed the campaign for Danni Roche to take over as the head of the AOC, and ran in the elections for the executive. While Roche's campaign was ultimately unsuccessful, Livingstone was the only member of the rival ticket to be elected.

From 2012 to 2016, Livingstone was chief executive of the Melbourne Vicentre Swimming Club. In November 2017, she joined the Australian Football League as head of women's football and managing the AFL Women's competition.

In September 2024, Livingstone was appointed chief executive officer of the Victorian Institute of Sport.

=== Other roles ===
At the time of her appointment to the board of Swimming Australia, Livingstone was also a member of the VicHealth and State Sports Centre Trust boards.

Following her mother's death from ovarian cancer, Livingstone started Ovarian Cancer Australia and is currently the patron of the organisation.

== Personal life ==
Livingstone was married to cyclist Clayton Stevenson, and is married to cinematographer Marty Smith.

She has three children, twins Ella and Joshua in 2002, and a second son, Robinson in 2007.

Her mother died from ovarian cancer, and both Livingstone and her sister have both tested positive for the BRCA2 gene. They have both had surgery to remove their ovaries.

Her father died of prostate cancer in 2014.

== Honours ==
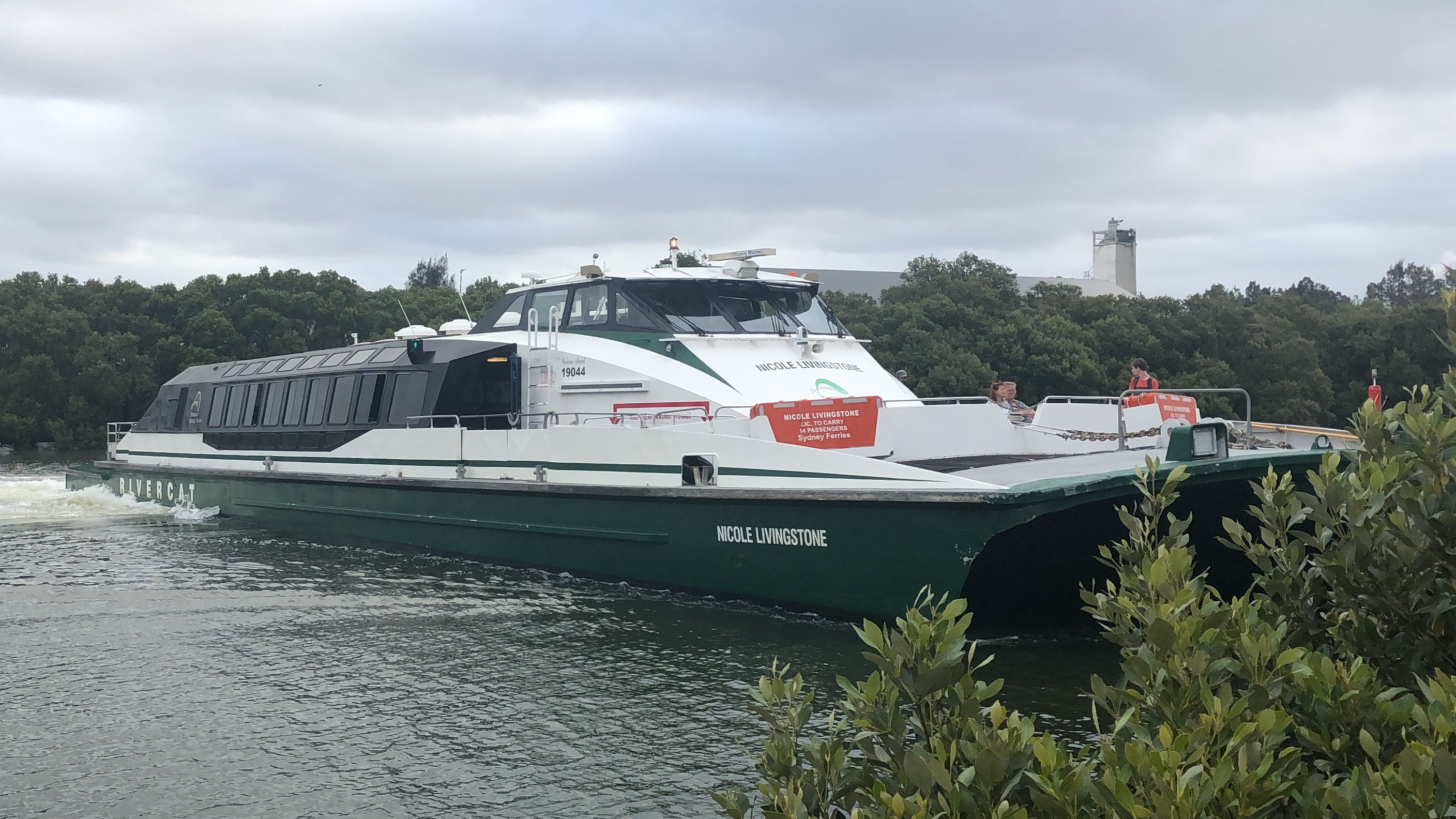
MV Nicole Livingstone

Livingstone was awarded the Medal of the Order of Australia in 1997 for service to swimming as a representative at state, national and international levels. This was upgraded to Officer of the Order of Australia in 2025 for distinguished service to sports development and administration, to the promotion of women in sport, and to community health.

She was inducted onto the Victorian Honour Roll of Women in 2006.

A Sydney RiverCat ferry was named after Livingstone in 1995.

In early 2025 the Rivercat ferry "Nicole Livingstone" was scrapped.

She was a finalist for the Veuve Clicquot BOLD Woman award in 2021.

== See also ==
- List of Olympic medalists in swimming (women)
- List of Commonwealth Games medallists in swimming (women)
