= This Is Littleton =

2012 sketch comedy series

This Is Littleton is a four-part sketch comedy series produced by High Wire Films which premiered in 2014 in Australia on ABC2.

== Overview ==
The series is set in and around Littleton City Council. Its staff and ratepayers navigate busking licence auditions, animal control officers convinced they are in the mob and Mayors with delusions of grandeur, while its municipal rooms-for-hire lure wildly inappropriate dance teachers, dubious self-improvement classes and harangued relationship counsellors.

The series was created by Amanda Brotchie and Nicole Minchin and directed by Amanda Brotchie. Executive Producers are Amanda Brotchie, Nicole Minchin and Adam Zwar. Head Writers are Amanda Brotchie, Karl Chandler, Tony Moclair, Dave O'Neil and Steen Raskopoulos.

The sketches are written and performed by Ronny Chieng, Matt Okine, Melinda Cklamovska, Tegan Higginbotham, Nathan Lovejoy, Miles O'Neil, Morgana O'Reilly, Stevo Petkovic, Steen Raskopoulos, Zachary Ruane, Vachel Spirason, Jackson Tozer and Adele Vuko. It premiered on 20 February 2014 and ended on 13 March 2014.

The debut episode rated 73,000 in the top 5 capital city markets.

== See also ==
- List of Australian television series
