= The Duchess (TV series) =

British comedy-drama television series

- Genre: Comedy drama
- Created by: Katherine Ryan
- Written by: Katherine Ryan
- Directed by: Toby MacDonald
- Starring: Katherine Ryan; Rory Keenan; Katy Byrne; Steen Raskopoulos; Michelle de Swarte; Sophie Fletcher; Doon Mackichan
- Music by: Oli Julian
- Opening theme: "Woman" by Diana Gordon (Note: First episode only)
- Country of origin: United Kingdom
- Original language: English
- No. of series: 1
- No. of episodes: 6

Production
- Executive producers: Katherine Ryan; Petra Fried; Murray Ferguson; Dave Becky; Josh Lieberman
- Producer: Gavin O'Grady
- Cinematography: Karl Óskarsson
- Editor: Paul Dingwall
- Camera setup: Single-camera
- Running time: 19–28 minutes
- Production companies: 3 Arts Entertainment; Clerkenwell Films

Original release
- Network: Netflix
- Release: 11 September 2020

The Duchess is a British comedy-drama television series created by and starring Katherine Ryan. It premiered on Netflix on 11 September 2020. On 29 April 2021, the series was cancelled after one series.

== Cast and characters ==
=== Main ===
- Katherine Ryan as Katherine, a ceramics artist and Olive's mother
- Rory Keenan as Shep, Katherine's ex-partner, Olive's father and a former boy band member
- Katy Byrne as Olive, Katherine and Shep's nine-year-old daughter
- Steen Raskopoulos as Evan, Katherine's boyfriend and an orthodontist
- Michelle de Swarte as Bev, Katherine's best friend and business partner
- Sophie Fletcher as Jane, Millie's mother
- Doon Mackichan as Cheryl, Shep's fiancée

=== Recurring ===
- Beau Gadsdon as Millie, Olive's friend
- Tony Jayawardena as Mr. Michaels, Olive and Millie's headmaster
- Anwar Lynch as Tom, Bev's husband and Shep's former Tru-Se bandmate
- Ash Rizi as Gareth, Shep’s former Tru-Se bandmate
- Ciaran Dowd as Dave, Shep’s former Tru-Se bandmate
- Geoff Norcott as Brian, Jane's husband
- Naz Osmanoglu as Leo, a hygienist at Evan's practice
- Maya Jama as Sandra, a dental nurse at Evan's practice

=== Guest ===
- Ajay Chhabra as Dr. Frederik, Katherine's fertility doctor
- Nathan Clarke as Jay
- Jacqueline King as Evan's mother
- Luis Soto as Evan's father
- Lorna Gayle as Seleena, from the adoption agency
- Natasha Radski as midwife
- Thanyia Moore as an officiant

== Episodes ==
=== Season 1 (2020) ===
No.	Title	Directed by	Written by	Original release date
1	"Episode 1"	Toby MacDonald	Katherine Ryan	September 11, 2020
To celebrate her daughter Olive's birthday, Katherine visits a fertility clinic to discuss the odds of giving her a sibling with help from a sperm donor.
2	"Episode 2"	Toby MacDonald	Katherine Ryan	September 11, 2020
Shep accepts Katherine's proposal — with oddly specific conditions. Jane and Katherine force the girls to hang out. Evan comes over to spend the night.
3	"Episode 3"	Toby MacDonald	Katherine Ryan	September 11, 2020
Katherine meets Shep for a failed transaction, then meets Evan's "nice and normal" parents. Bev and Katherine speak at a feminist convention.
4	"Episode 4"	Toby MacDonald	Katherine Ryan	September 11, 2020
After Katherine strikes out with an adoption agent, Olive and Millie get suspended. Shep shocks everyone with big news. Bev spies Evan at a pub.
5	"Episode 5"	Toby MacDonald	Katherine Ryan	September 11, 2020
Katherine renews her quest to get pregnant with help from a surprising source. Praise be! But is it too good to be true? Elsewhere, Olive's growing up.
6	"Episode 6"	Toby MacDonald	Katherine Ryan	September 11, 2020
Secrets swirl around Shep's big day ... and savvy Jane has it all figured out. With so much at stake, can Katherine control the chaos?

== Reception ==
On Rotten Tomatoes, the series holds an approval rating of 63% based on 19 reviews, with an average rating of 6/10. On Metacritic, the series has a weighted average score of 35 out of 100, based on 7 critics, indicating "generally unfavorable reviews".
