= Top Coppers =

Cult BBC TV comedy series

- Genre: Sitcom
- Written by: Andy Kinnear; Céin McGillicuddy
- Directed by: Céin McGillicuddy
- Starring: Steen Raskopoulos; John Kearns
- Country of origin: United Kingdom
- Original language: English
- No. of series: 1
- No. of episodes: 6

Production
- Executive producer: Ash Atalla
- Producer: Bertie Peek
- Production location: United Kingdom
- Running time: 30 minutes

Original release
- Network: BBC iPlayer; BBC Three
- Release: 19 August – 23 September 2015

Top Coppers (released 19 August 2015) is a British sitcom, co-written and created by Andy Kinnear and Céin McGillicuddy and directed by Céin McGillicuddy. It was broadcast on BBC Three, BBC Two, and was available on Netflix UK. It is currently available on ITVX.

== Background ==
Top Coppers follow the adventures of cops John Mahogany (Steen Raskopoulos) and Mitch Rust (John Kearns) as they attempt to rid the fictional world of Justice City from its deranged criminal underworld. They both have red hair (ie copper coloured), giving a double meaning to the show's title.

The universe and its characters are derived from the conventions of American and British police shows of the 70s and 80s, from Starsky & Hutch to The Professionals, but is set in no specific time or country.

The series is based on an independent mini series of the same name, also created by Andy Kinnear and Céin McGillicuddy and with the same actor playing Chief, Donovan Blackwood.

== Episodes ==
The first series premiered on 19 August 2015 on BBC Three and ran for 6 episodes which aired on Wednesdays. The first series was repeated on BBC Two on Sundays from 4 October 2015. The series was available on Netflix UK from June 2021 to June 2022. It is currently available on ITVX.

| No. | Title | Directed by | Written by | Original BBC Three release date |
|---|---|---|---|---|
| 1 | "The Chill of the Cockney Freezer" | Céin McGillicuddy | Andy Kinnear & Céin McGillicuddy | 19 August 2015 |
The comic adventures of Justice City's hero cops Mahogany and Rust. Notorious Cockney crime boss Harry McCrane takes over an ice cream factory.
| 2 | "The Girdle of Randall Rodgers" | Céin McGillicuddy | Andy Kinnear & Céin McGillicuddy | 26 August 2015 |
When the ageing star of hit sci-fi show Future Space starts receiving anonymous death threats, Mahogany finds himself coming face to face with his childhood hero. Meanwhile, Rust hates actors, until he finds out that being an actor makes you rich. Guest stars James Fleet.
| 3 | "The Venom of Dr Schäfer" | Céin McGillicuddy | Paul Doolan | 2 September 2015 |
Mahogany and Rust investigate mysterious disappearances near Dr Schäfer's top secret medical research lab.
| 4 | "The Twist of the French Nicker" | Céin McGillicuddy | Paul Doolan | 9 September 2015 |
The world's greatest art thief and Frenchman, Gerard Cliché, is in town. Meanwhile, Mahogany & Rust are out to win the Golden Doughnut, the prize for the best crime fighting duo. It's surely in the bag too, providing Romero & Byrne don't turn up.
| 5 | "The Escape of Vince Rust" | Céin McGillicuddy | Andy Kinnear, Céin McGillicuddy & Paul Doolan | 16 September 2015 |
Rust's identical twin brother Vince escapes from Justice City penitentiary with a devious plan to swap places with Rust and infiltrate JCPD. Meanwhile, it's Mahogany's birthday and he's fed up that Rust has forgotten all about it AGAIN. Just typical.
| 6 | "The Passion of the Chris" | Céin McGillicuddy | Ben Edwards | 23 September 2015 |
Justice City's darkest hour! A mysterious computer hacker launches a cyber attack on the whole city, demanding just one thing - John Mahogany. Meanwhile, Rust must avoid the tax inspector as he hasn't paid a penny in five years. He has a sneaky plan.

== Cast ==
=== Main cast ===
- Steen Raskopoulos - John Mahogany
- John Kearns - Mitch Rust
- Donovan Blackwood - Chief
- Gabby Best - Helga
- John Hollingworth - Peterson
- Phil Wang - McGockey
- Rio Myers - Zach
- Diana Vickers - Chris
- Rich Fulcher - Mayor Grady
- Alan Dale - Frank (voice)

=== Guest appearances ===
- Paul Ritter - Harry McCrane
- Danny John-Jules - Captain Woods (the 'rival' police chief of 'Ace Town')
- Kayvan Novak - The Notorious French Thief Gerard Cliché
- Natasia Demetriou - Gale
- Alex Beckett - Martin
- Simon Farnaby - Dr. Schafer
- James Fleet - Charles Leatherby
- Tom Bennett - Steve
- Lydia Rose Bewley - Agent Byrne
- Jessica Gunning - Agent Romero
- Terry Mynott - Nolan
- Adam Riches - Flanagan
- Joseph Varley - Varley
- John Chancer - Randall Rodgers / Captain Steele
- James Doherty - Television Producer

== Locations ==
Whilst the series is mainly shot in at West London Film Studios, there were also some exterior shots and sequences filmed on location.

The exterior of Justice City Police Department is filmed at the main entrance to the Dagenham Civic Centre on Rainham Road North, Dagenham Essex, with the JCPD sign above the door digitally composited to replace the crest above the doorway and a city skyline composited behind the building.
