= The Office (Australian TV series) =

Australian television series

- Promotional teaser poster
- Genre: Mockumentary; Workplace comedy; Sitcom
- Based on: The Office by: Ricky Gervais; Stephen Merchant
- Developed by: Julie De Fina; Jackie van Beek
- Starring: Felicity Ward; Edith Poor; Steen Raskopoulos; Shari Sebbens; Josh Thomson; Jonny Brugh; Susan Ling Young; Raj Labade; Lucy Schmidt; Zoe Terakes; Pallavi Sharda; Claude Jabbour; Jason Perini; Christian Manon; Olga Tamara
- Theme music composer: David McCormack
- Country of origin: Australia
- Original language: English
- No. of seasons: 1
- No. of episodes: 8

Production
- Executive producers: Kylie Washington; Julie De Fina; Jackie van Beek; Sophia Zachariou
- Producer: Linda Micsko
- Cinematography: Bevan Crothers
- Editors: Ian Carmichael; Matthew Evans; Alex Boyd
- Camera setup: Single-camera
- Production companies: BBC Studios ANZ; Bunya Entertainment; Amazon MGM Studios

Original release
- Network: Amazon Prime Video
- Release: 18 October 2024

The Office is an Australian mockumentary sitcom television series based on the British series of the same name created by Ricky Gervais and Stephen Merchant. The series stars Felicity Ward in the lead role, with the supporting ensemble cast including Edith Poor, Steen Raskopoulos, Shari Sebbens, Josh Thomson, Jonny Brugh, Susan Ling Young, Raj Labade, Lucy Schmidt, Zoe Terakes, Pallavi Sharda, Claude Jabbour, Jason Perini, Christian Manon and Olga Tamara.

It is the first female-led series in The Office franchise, the third English-language entry after the British and American series, and the fifteenth overall adaptation. In October 2025, the series was cancelled after one season.

== Premise ==
Hannah Howard is the managing director of Sydney's branch of Australia's fourth largest packaging company Flinley Craddick. When she gets news from Head Office that her Rydalmere-based branch will be shut down and everyone will go remote, she goes into survival mode, making promises she can't keep in order to keep her "work family" together.

== Cast and characters ==
=== Main ===
- Felicity Ward as Hannah Howard, the managing director of Flinley Craddick, Sydney
- Edith Poor as Lizze Moyle, the receptionist, front desk executive and productivity manager
- Steen Raskopoulos as Nick Fletcher, a sales representative
- Shari Sebbens as Greta King, a sales representative
- Josh Thomson as Martin Katavake, the head of human resources
- Jonny Brugh as Lloyd Kneath, the head of IT
- Susan Ling Young as Tina Kwong, a sales representative
- Raj Labade as Sebastian Roy, an intern
- Lucy Schmidt as Deborah Leonard, the head of finance
- Zoe Terakes as Stevie Jones, the head of the warehouse
- Pallavi Sharda as Alisha Khanna, the regional director of Flinley Craddick Australia
- Claude Jabbour as Mason, Greta's boyfriend
- Jason Perini as Johnny, a warehouse staff member

=== Guest ===
- Susie Youssef as Georgia
- Justin Rosniak as Phil
- Carlo Ritchie as Lopez Worker #1
- Rick Donald as Danny
- Chris Bunton as Dylan

== Episodes ==
No.	Title	Directed by	Written by	Original release date
1	"IRL"	Jackie van Beek	Jackie van Beek	18 October 2024
2	"The Wake"	Christiaan Van Vuuren	Julie De Fina & Jackie van Beek	18 October 2024
3	"Melbourne Cup"	Christiaan Van Vuuren	Jesse Griffin & Julie De Fina	18 October 2024
4	"Tax Dodge"	Jessie Griffin	Julie De Fina	18 October 2024
5	"Pyjama Day"	Jackie van Beek	Julie De Fina & Jackie van Beek	18 October 2024
6	"Women in Business"	Jesse Griffin	Jesse Griffin	18 October 2024
7	"Away Day"	Jackie van Beek	Jesse Griffin	18 October 2024
8	"The Sales Report"	Jackie van Beek	Julie De Fina & Jackie van Beek	18 October 2024

== Production ==
=== Development ===
An Australian adaptation of the BBC series The Office, which was created by Ricky Gervais and Stephen Merchant, was announced to be in development in May 2023. The series is the 13th adaptation in The Office franchise, and the third English-language version. It is co-produced by BBC Studios Australia & New Zealand, Bunya Entertainment, and Amazon MGM Studios. The adaptation was developed for Australia by Julie De Fina and Jackie van Beek, who both serve as executive producers along with Kylie Washington and Sophia Zachariou. The series is produced by Linda Micsko. Gervais commented on the series, stating "I'm very excited about Australia remaking my little show from the turn of the century. Office politics have changed a bit in 20 years, so can't wait to see how they navigate a modern-day David Brent."

=== Casting ===
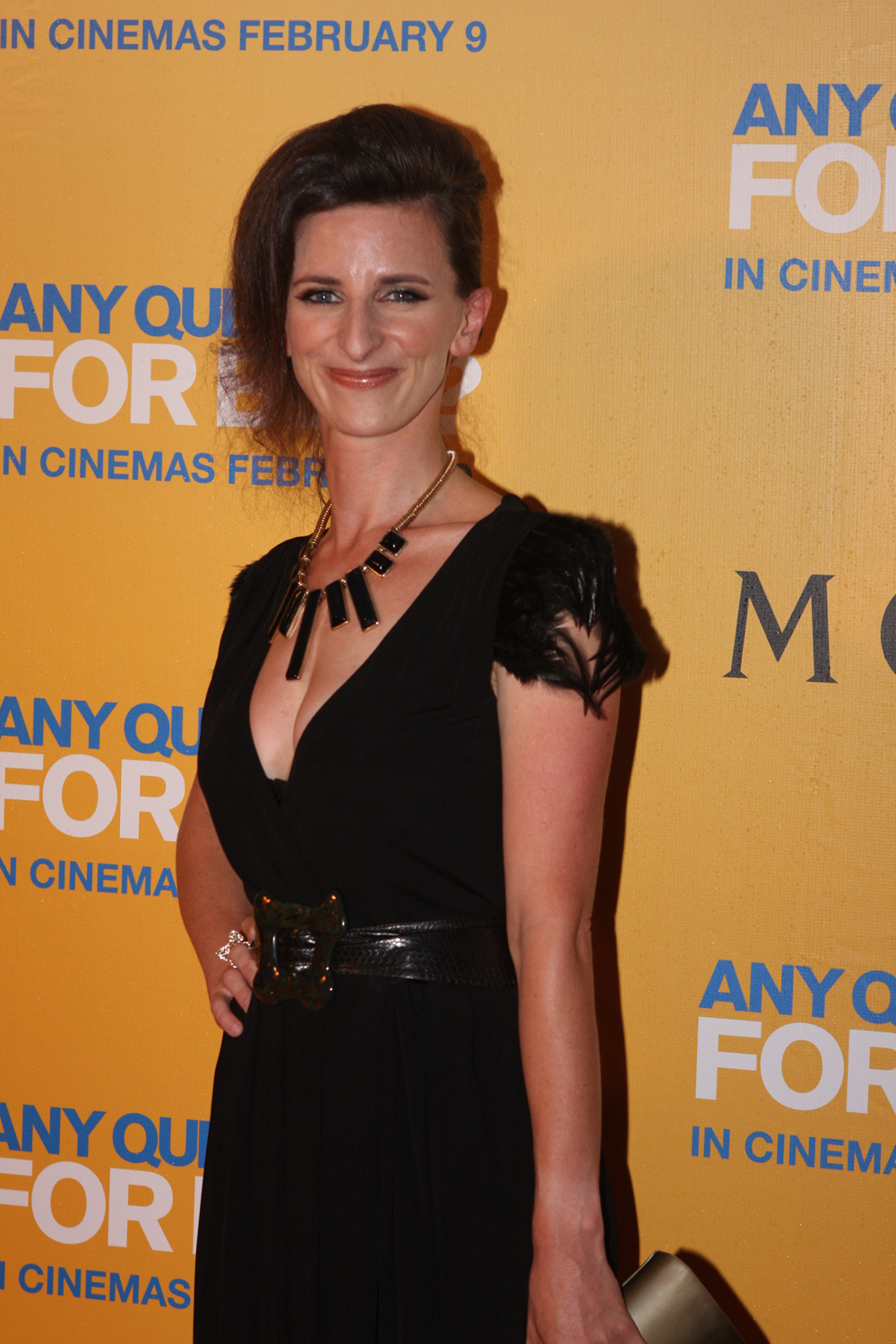
Felicity Ward portrays the first female lead in The Office franchise.

Felicity Ward stars in the leading role, portraying Hannah Howard, making the Australian adaptation the first series in The Office franchise to have a female lead. The series has been described as female-led, with many of the characters which were male in the original and American iterations being adapted as females.

=== Filming ===
Principal photography took place in mid-2023, in Rydalmere, Sydney.

== Release ==
An official trailer for the series was released on YouTube on 18 September 2024 and was met with a mostly negative reception. All eight episodes were released on 18 October 2024 on Amazon Prime Video, with the series being available worldwide except for the United States. In October 2025 it was reported that the series had been cancelled after one season.

== Reception ==
=== Pre-release ===
Upon both the series' 2023 announcement and 2024 trailer release, The Office was negatively compared to other Australian comedy series, such as Utopia and Deadloch.

=== Critical response ===
On review aggregator website Rotten Tomatoes, the series holds a 71% rating with an average rating of 6.1/10, based on 14 reviews. The consensus reads, "Relocating The Office Down Under doesn't completely sidestep the pitfalls of feeling like a photocopy of a photocopy, but a likable cast keeps this new workplace highly watchable."

== Awards and nominations ==
Year	Award	Category	Recipient(s)	Result	Ref.
2025	14th AACTA Awards	Best Narrative Comedy Series	Sophia Zachariou, Kylie Washington, Linda Micsko	Nominated	
2025	14th AACTA Awards	Best Acting in a Comedy	Felicity Ward	Nominated	
