= Sideliners =

Australian comedy sport panel chat show

Sideliners (originally called Fever Pitch) is an Australian comedy sport panel chat show hosted by Nicole Livingstone and comedian Tegan Higginbotham which screens on the ABC. They are joined by a regular team of athletes and comedians including Amberley Lobo, comedian Dave Thornton and Paralympian Dylan Alcott. The first one-hour live show premiered on Friday, 30 June 2017 at 6pm.

== See also ==
- List of Australian television series
- List of programs broadcast by ABC (Australian TV network)
