= Jonathan Brugh =

New Zealand actor and comedian

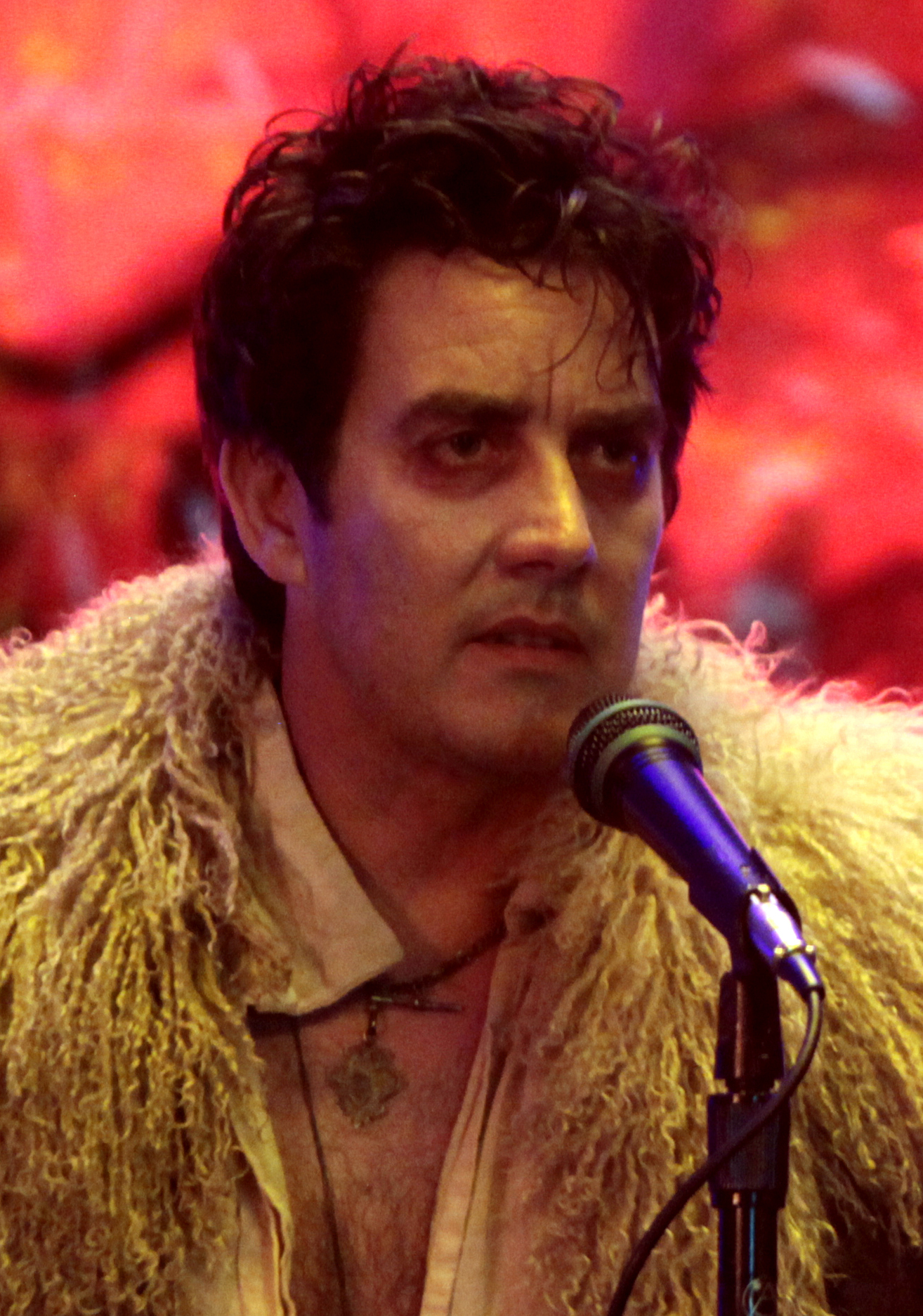
- Brugh at the 2016 Mad Monster Arizona
- Born: Wellington, New Zealand
- Occupations: Actor; producer

Jonathan Brugh, also known as Jonny Brugh, is a New Zealand comedian, actor, and musician. He is best known for his work in What We Do in the Shadows (2014). In the 1990s, he was part of the comic duo Sugar and Spice.

== Early life ==
Jonathan Brugh was born in Wellington, New Zealand. His family moved to Auckland in 1977, where he was schooled at Sacred Heart College. He met fellow comedians Jason Hoyte and Brendhan Lovegrove during his time at the Auckland Society of Arts and then later completed a degree in design and photography at Auckland Institute of Arts.

== Career ==
=== Film and television ===
In 1993, Brugh created comic duo Sugar and Spice with Jason Hoyte and performed comedy across Australasia with Te Radar and Brendhan Lovegrove, who all became comedians together. Sugar and Spice were regular performers on long-running New Zealand live comic show Pulp Comedy (1996–2001). In 1996, they won a Chapman Tripp Theatre Award for Best Comic Performance, and in 1998, they won the Billy T Award (1998).

Brugh is best known for his role as Deacon in What We Do In The Shadows (2014), a film by Taika Waititi and Jemaine Clement. He has previously worked with Clement in the mockumentary Ashley Thorndyke – A Work In Progress by Duncan Sarkies.

Brugh has starred in a number of television series including The Jaquie Brown Diaries (2009), ABC's Soul Mates (2014), 800 Words (2015), and Watercooler (2018).

His other film credits include What We Do In The Shadows: Interviews With Some Vampires (2005), the precursor to the hit cult feature released in 2014, Tangiwai (2011), How To Meet Girls From A Distance (2012), and Waru (2017).

His latest feature film, Mega Time Squad, was released in early 2019.

He was as of 2016 a narrator in Duncan Sarkies' radio series Uncle Bertie's Botanarium alongside Jemaine Clement and musician Lawrence Arabia.

He is co-creator, with Jesse Griffin and Jackie van Beek, of the award-winning 2019 TV sitcom about teachers in a secondary school, called Educators. He also stars in the show.

In 2022, he reunited with director Taika Waititi for a cameo appearance in Thor: Love and Thunder as the god, Rapu.

In 2024, he was cast as Lloyd Kneath for the Australian adaptation of The Office.

=== Music and theatre ===
Brugh plays bass guitar, guitar and xylophone. He is best known for his time in The Fagan Band (2012–2014). He has played bass for Phil Nicol Band and The jazz band during the New Zealand International Comedy Festival.

In February 2020, Brugh premiered a solo 60-minute theatre performance titled Deacon the Vampire Live: 188 Years of Bullshit. The performance was a part of the annual Bread & Circus World Buskers Festival.
