= Whose Line Is It Anyway? Australia =

Australian comedy TV series (2016–2017)

- Genre: Comedy
- Created by: Dan Patterson; Mark Leveson
- Based on: Whose Line Is It Anyway? (British original)
- Presented by: Tommy Little
- Starring: Rhys Darby; Cal Wilson; Tegan Higginbotham; Steen Raskopoulos; Bridie Connell; Tom Walker; Susie Youssef
- Country of origin: Australia
- Original language: English
- No. of seasons: 1
- No. of episodes: 10

Production
- Executive producers: Kevin Whyte; Craig Campbell
- Production locations: Melbourne, Victoria, Australia
- Running time: 30 minutes
- Production companies: Guesswork Television; Roger That TV; Foxtel Entertainment

Original release
- Network: The Comedy Channel; Network 10
- Release: 27 November 2016 – 12 February 2017

Related
- Whose Line Is It Anyway? (British original); Whose Line Is It Anyway? (American edition)

Whose Line is it Anyway? Australia (also known as Whose Line? and Whose Line? Oz) is a 10-part Australian improvisational comedy show, based on the British show of the same name, hosted by Tommy Little on Foxtel network's The Comedy Channel, premiering on 27 November 2016.

There are seven cast members throughout the series, with four performing each episode, using the same basic formula as the other versions of the show. The ensemble cast include Rhys Darby, Cal Wilson, Tegan Higginbotham, Susie Youssef, Steen Raskopoulos, Bridie Connell and Tom Walker.

On 10 November 2016, before the show's premiere, host Tommy Little jokingly announced a second season at a Melbourne-based media event without the permission from Foxtel executives. At the time the show had not gotten a formal renewal.

== List of games ==
Game Played	Number of Performers	Number of Times Played
Scenes from a Hat	All	10
Whose Line	2	3
Dating Service Video/Hats	All	5
Sound Effects	2	1
Props	All	5
Weird Newsreaders	All	4
Questions Only	All	3
Rock Out	All	10
Bartender	All	4
Newsflash	3	3
Old Job / New Job	All	1
Helping Hands	3	2
Quick Change	3 / Tommy	5
Dead Bodies	All	1
Let's Make a Date	All	1
World's Worst	All	3
Hollywood Director	All	1
Secret	2	2
What's in the Bag?	2	1
Press Conference	All	1
Greatest Hits	3	1
Themed Restaurant	All	1
Questions with Wigs	All	1
Superheroes	All	1

== Episodes ==
No. overall	No. in season	Original air date	Performer 1	Performer 2	Performer 3	Performer 4	Viewers
1	1	27 November 2016	Tegan Higginbotham	Steen Raskopoulos	Tom Walker	Cal Wilson	34,000
Games performed: Scenes from a Hat, Whose Line, Dating Service Videos, Sound Effects (with an audience member), Props, Weird Newscasters, Questions Only, Rock Out.
2	2	4 December 2016	Cal Wilson	Steen Raskopoulos	Bridie Connell	Rhys Darby	N/A
Games performed: Scenes from a Hat, Hollywood Director, Dating Service Videos, Dubbing, Bartender, Newsflash, Rock Out.
3	3	11 December 2016	Tegan Higginbotham	Steen Raskopoulos	Susie Youssef	Rhys Darby	N/A
Games performed: Scenes from a Hat, Old Job / New Job, Helping Hands, Quick Change, Props, Newsflash, Rock Out.
4	4	18 December 2016	Tegan Higginbotham	Tom Walker	Bridie Connell	Steen Raskopoulos	N/A
Games performed: Scenes from a Hat, Dead Bodies, Quick Change, Bartender, Let's Make a Date, World's Worst, Rock Out.
5	5	8 January 2017	Susie Youssef	Steen Raskopoulos	Cal Wilson	Rhys Darby	N/A
Games performed: Scenes from a Hat, Secret, Questions with Wigs, Quick Change, Props, Whose Line, Rock Out.
6	6	15 January 2017	Tom Walker	Susie Youssef	Steen Raskopoulos	Cal Wilson	N/A
Games performed: Scenes From a Hat, Secret, Dating Service Video/Hats, Weird Newscasters, Props, Dubbing, Rock Out.
7	7	23 January 2017	Steen Raskopoulos	Tom Walker	Bridie Connell	Rhys Darby	N/A
Games performed: Scenes from a Hat, Quick Change, Dating Service Video/Hats, What's in the Bag?, Bartender, Dubbing, Rock Out.
8	8	29 January 2017	Susie Youssef	Steen Raskopoulos	Bridie Connell	Rhys Darby	N/A
Games performed: Scenes from a Hat, Press Conference, Questions Only, Weird Newsreaders, World's Worst, Greatest Hits, Rock Out.
9	9	5 February 2017	Tom Walker	Cal Wilson	Steen Raskopoulos	Tegan Higginbotham	N/A
Games performed: Scenes from a Hat, Themed Restaurant, Superheroes, World's Worst, Helping Hands, Newsflash, Rock Out.
10	10	12 February 2017	Susie Youssef	Steen Raskopoulos	Bridie Connell	Tom Walker	N/A
Games performed: Scenes from a Hat, Whose Line, Dating Service Video/Hats, Weird Newsreaders, Bartender, Quick Change, Rock Out
