= Christian Manon =

French-Australian actor based in Sydney (born 1950)

- Manon in 2023
- Born: France
- Occupation: Actor
- Years active: 1969–2024
- Website: christianmanon.wixsite.com/christian-manon/biography

Christian Manon is a French-Australian actor based in Sydney. He is best known for his work in Australian theatre and television. His most notable film role was "Mael" in the film adaptation of the Anne Rice novel, Queen of the Damned.

== Career ==
Manon appeared in five stage productions with the Sydney Theatre Company.

Television appearances include True Story with Hamish & Andy.

His feature film credits include Queen of the Damned.

== Filmography ==
=== Film ===
Year	Title	Role	Notes
1983	Midnite Spares	Roadhouse Mechanic (uncredited)	Feature film
1983	The Return of Captain Invincible	Polish Migrant (uncredited)	Feature film
1985	Mad Max Beyond Thunderdome	Tribesman (uncredited)	Feature film
1988	Young Einstein	Darwin's Bodyguard #2	Feature film
1989	The Punisher	French Leader	Feature film
1996	Down Rusty Down	Jean-Pierre	Short film
1997	Oscar and Lucinda	Mr. Tomasetti	Feature film
1998	Babe: Pig in the City	Lab Technician #2	Feature film
2000	Mission: Impossible 2	Dr. Sergei Gradsky	Feature film
2002	Queen of the Damned	Mael	Feature film
2005	Fallers	Pierre Desporge	Short film
2011	Killer Elite	Voice (uncredited)	Feature film
2012	Dead Europe	Voice	Feature film
2012	Gödel Incomplete	Cleaner	Short film
2013	A Farewell Party	Old Man	Short film
2013	An Accidental Soldier	Old Soldier	TV movie

=== Television ===
Year	Title	Role	Notes
1982	Bodyline		TV miniseries
1988	A Country Practice		TV series
1988	The Last Resort		TV series
1998	A Difficult Woman		TV series
2000	Bondi Banquet		TV series
2001-2002	BackBerner		TV series
2005	All Saints		TV series
2007	Stupid Stupid Man		TV series
2013	Packed to the Rafters		TV series
2013	A Place to Call Home		TV series
2015	Australia: The Story of Us		Docudrama miniseries
2017	True Story with Hamish & Andy		TV series
2018	Doctor Doctor		TV series
2024	The Office		TV series
