= Clayton Stevenson =

Australian cyclist

Personal information
- Born: 29 December 1967 (age 58) Sydney, Australia

Cycling career
- Sport: Cycling

Clayton Stevenson (born 29 December 1967) is an Australian former cyclist. He competed in the team time trial at the 1988 Summer Olympics.
