= The Ronnie Johns Half Hour =

- Created by: The 3rd Degree
- Starring: Heath Franklin; Jordan Raskopoulos; Dan Ilic; Felicity Ward; James Pender; Caz Fitzgerald; Becci Gage
- Country of origin: Australia
- No. of seasons: 2
- No. of episodes: 26

Production
- Running time: 23 minutes per episode

Original release
- Network: Network Ten
- Release: October 2005 – December 2006

The Ronnie Johns Half Hour (full name The Ronnie Johns Good Times Campfire Jamboree Half Hour Show (Now on Television)) was an Australian sketch comedy show produced by Jigsaw Entertainment and the Ten Network, which premiered in October 2005. The cast of the show came from a series of stage shows called The 3rd Degree.

== Background and production ==
The cast of the show came from a series of stage shows called The 3rd Degree, the first shows of which were co-produced by John Pinder, and also Laughing Stock Productions, which featured selections from Australian university revues, and consists of Heath Franklin, Jordan Raskopoulos, Dan Ilic, Felicity Ward, James Pender, Caroline Fitzgerald, and Becci Gage. Gage only appeared as a supporting cast member in the first series but has a more significant role in the second. Chris McDonald, creator and producer of The 3rd Degree stage shows, acts as the show's head writer and co-producer. Nikos Andronicos and Justin Heazlewood are credited as non-performing writers.

From 2006 The 3rd Degree worked on solo projects, notably Heath Franklin as Chopper and Jordan Raskopoulos in The Axis of Awesome. The first and second series are available on DVD and are distributed through Sony.

The Ronnie Johns Half Hour was created after representatives from Channel 10 saw a performance of The 3rd Degree's stage show, and were impressed by the cast and characters. They offered the group the chance to film a pilot. Originally, the cast was going to call the show The 3rd Degree, after the name of their performance group. Channel 10, however, liked the idea of Ronnie Johns being the host, so they asked if the show could be renamed after him. In response, The 3rd Degree came up with a title that they felt was ridiculously long, The Ronnie Johns Good Times Campfire Jamboree Half Hour Show (Now on Television). The network shortened it to The Ronnie Johns Half Hour. Despite this, the writers, cast and prop designers try to sneak in The 3rd Degree's logo as much as possible in sketches. For example, football jerseys will have The 3rd Degree as their sponsor.

== Release ==
The first season of The Ronnie Johns Half Hour ran for 13 episodes. The first six aired from October 2005 and the remaining seven aired from February 2006. The first series began airing in New Zealand on the C4 Network from 25 July. The second series began airing on 17 August 2006 at 9pm on channel 10, and is 13 episodes in length.

== Recurring characters ==
As well as many stand-alone sketches, The Ronnie Johns Half Hour features a number of characters who have appeared in multiple episodes.

=== Ronnie Johns ===
The title character of the show, Ronnie Johns (Franklin) is the "comedy cowboy"; he rides upon the "Good Taste Pony" (a papier-mâché horse worn around his waist). Ronnie appears in the opening and closing scenes of the show, as well as occasionally interjecting between sketches, commenting on them and warning the audience about potential bad taste. He has a slight obsession with prairie dogs.

=== Paulie ===
Paulie (Raskopoulos), a young man of unknown Mediterranean heritage, dressed in a green-and-pink striped polo shirt, confronts various people to complain about what might be termed pedantic issues. For example, in his first appearance, he explains to a cashier at a store that gnocchi is actually made of potatoes, and should not be placed in the pasta aisle. Other complaints he made included wanting to change the nickname of the Australian soccer team because a "socceroo" is not a real animal, and that George Orwell's Nineteen Eighty-Four is "incorrect" because its events did not occur in 1984. In a more recent episode, Paulie confronts the owner of an Adult Sex shop telling him that the "edible undies" should have a nutritional value printed on the box, just in case a vegan is starving to death and needs to know that there is no beef in them. At the end of each sketch Paulie recommends that the problem be solved by putting a sticker on the offending object, and assures the target of his complaint that "I've got my eye on youse". Perhaps to prove a point, the scenarios are often shown later on in the episode.

On the Season 1 finale, it was revealed that Paulie's campaign against gnocchi began when his parents both ordered it at a restaurant, thinking it was pasta, and died from potato allergies.

=== Poppy ===
Poppy (Ward) is depicted as a small, innocent girl, who asks a stranger (most likely Pender) if they would like to look at her picture book. The book contains pictures of often controversial issues such as the Abu Ghraib torture and prisoner abuse or the Ku Klux Klan, but Poppy's narration describes them more naively, suggesting they are, for example, performing acrobatics routines or playing dress-ups.

Her parents are drug addicts while her father is a Vietnam veteran and has an older brother who is homosexual, an older teenage sister who is pregnant, an uncle with a mail-order bride and has a gambling addiction which sends him homeless (and without a kidney) and a grandfather who is a WW II veteran. Like Paulie, events from past episodes and sketches sometimes occur again at a later date.

=== Gary and Gary ===
Gary (Pender) and Gary (Franklin) are two stereotypical English backpackers with an obsession for the TV soap opera Neighbours, particularly for the character of Toadfish Rebecchi. Whilst backpacking through Australia they grow quite bored of the sights and often complain about everything. However, almost all of the sketches quickly lead to them relieving their boredom by indulging in their favourite pastime of kicking each other in the "janglies" - each takes turn to kick the other between the legs. This is the main example of faux English slang which the characters habitually use. Towards the end of the series an American backpacker, Chuck, joined the duo. The Garys shifted from only complaining about Australia to also making fun of Chuck and his country of origin.

The 3rd Degree did not have permission to shoot some of the Gary and Gary sketches (particularly the ones filmed at Circular Quay), so they went to the location and filmed the sketches in front of the public.

=== Chopper Read ===
One of the few depictions of a real person, the infamous criminal Mark 'Chopper' Read (Franklin) appears as a special guest in various incongruous situations, such as reading a story for children a la Play School or calling numbers for bingo. Much of the humour in Chopper's segments derives from his penchants for swearing and violence, as well as his lack of education, as demonstrated in the bingo sketch where he points out "I can't even fuckin' count, and I'm gonna host bingo! It's just like bloody dingo but it's safer with your kids, isn't it?". Chopper also makes many threatening statements directed at Neville Bartos, a character based on a real person who the real Chopper allegedly shot before going to prison, but with whom Chopper is now good friends. Franklin's portrayal of Read is as much based on the real Chopper as it is on Eric Bana's take on the man as portrayed in the 2000 Andrew Dominik film of the same name.

In the second season, rather than Chopper having a new job every week, the sketches are set in his apartment. In one episode Chopper introduces a Puppet version of himself, "Mini-Chopper", and teaches children about "Stranger Danger". In a later sketch he sings nursery rhymes. In another episode aired in an earlier timeslot, he mentioned that due to TV censorship laws he was restricted to saying the word fuck 15 times per episode, and after exceeding the 15-word limit, the word was bleeped from thereon.

The sketch where Chopper presents the weather became something of a phenomenon on the internet, with people all over Australia forwarding the clip on to other people. Heath Franklin (the actor who plays Chopper) even had the sketch sent to him, which he found amusing. The real Chopper, in a TV interview, praised Franklin's comedic impression of him.

=== Social Suicide Bomber ===
The Social Suicide Bomber (Raskopoulos) is an awkward-looking man in a burgundy blazer and salmon-pink shirt who is summoned by people who are stuck in unpleasant social situations - such as an unattractive man flirting with a woman who does not want that kind of attention - by pressing a large red button. He drives away the unwanted person with banal comments or bizarre actions, like demonstrating his pterodactyl impersonation. Unfortunately, with that person gone, the Social Suicide Bomber then often turns his sights to the person who called him, creating a situation that was more awkward than the one to begin with.

=== The Nihilists ===
Simon (Franklin), Gretchen (Ward) and Sigmund (Pender) are a trio of apathetic Germans who dress in black and speak in monotonous voices. They appear in places that are usually the source of happy, bubbly personalities, like children's TV shows, aerobics shows, or as replacements for a department store Santa, and frequently make comments on the meaninglessness and futility of life, love and other endeavours.

Gretchen is shown to be harbouring much aggression, and frequently has small outbursts of anger, and it is also shown her birthday is on the same day as Simon's. The Nihilists are based on characters that appeared in a Macquarie University comedy revue.

The Nihilist sketch "Sigfeld" is a parody of Seinfeld where the trio act similar to Seinfeld while remaining in nihilistic character.

=== Windshadow and Jemima ===
Windshadow (Fitzgerald) is an "Earth Mother". She is continually embarrassing her school-aged daughter, Jemima (Ward) in front of Jemima's friend Steve (Pender) with her nature/fertility rituals.

=== Henry Limpton's Teabag ===
Henry Limpton (Pender) is a man with an unfortunate compulsion. He cannot help but dunk his scrotum (known as Teabagging) into his friend, Cochese's (Raskopoulos) food and beverages. This is played out in mime with campy sitcom music. Henry has ruined Cochese's beer, fruit punch and fondue. During the Christmas episode he "teabagged" a chimney while Santa was descending. In the pilot, the character was called "Henry Lipton", until this caught the attention of Unilever, owners of the Lipton tea brand. Unilever threatened to pull all their advertising from Channel 10, but were placated by the insertion of the 'm' in the character's surname.

=== Jesus Christ ===
The son of God. Jesus (Pender) finds himself in many sketches on the show however his sketches do not have a common stylistic or narrative link. In one sketch he was trying to reach his mobile phone while crucified. In another he was challenged to avoid "towel-flicking" someone's bottom and on another occasion he was the spokesman for "High Five a Muslim Day". Some sketches have Jesus teamed up with Mohammed, portrayed by Ilic.

=== Rastus ===
A puppet dog (voiced and controlled by Ilic) with a left political outlook. Whenever Rastus encounters statements that he does not agree with, whether it be a right wing house guest or a talk-back radio host Rastus responds with barks, growls and even attacks. The sketches often end with Rastus' owner, Miles (Franklin), being persuaded not to put up with the person any longer and telling the character "No, Rastus is quite right, I think you're full of shit."

=== Phillip Mandrake ===
Phillip (Raskopoulos) is a bearded man in an overcoat who goes shopping. He makes a small inquiry about the item he wants to purchase, usually a foodstuff (mangoes, ice-cream, free-range eggs and some ming dynasty vases) and after he purchases three of the item he throws them on the floor and steps on them dramatically. When the shopkeeper asks him 'What did you do that for?!?!' He then turns to the seller of the item and says that he did not like the item e.g. "I don't like your mangoes." After each skit, as Mandrake is walking away, old horror movie like music plays.

=== Single Entendre Man ===
Single Entendre Man (Raskopoulos) is famous for making outrageously explicit comments in a direct manner (i.e. without euphemisms). Sketches often involve his friend (Ilic) making a double entendre comment only for Single Entendre Man to respond with an explicit comment that has the same meaning as the double entendre about a relative of the friend.

=== Ranger Dan ===
Ranger Dan (Ilic) provides the public with the 3rd Degree's community service announcements. He advocates bizarre initiatives such as giving homeless people violins to play sad music to distinguish themselves as genuinely homeless. Ranger Dan appeared to commit suicide in the final episode of series one, however, he returns in Series 2 to announce that ugly people would be given a guitar to make them more attractive. Ronnie Johns himself comments on this, saying "If you're only a little bit ugly, I recommend the ukulele!"

=== Wayne and Stacey ===
Wayne (Ilic) and Stacey (Fitzgerald) are a middle eastern couple. Wayne is a full-time Jihadist for Al-Qaeda. Wayne's terrorist ways often create trouble for their relationship. The scenes are played very melodramatically in a parody of soap operas.

=== Underground Girl and Underground Guy ===
An emo girl (Ward) and an emo guy (Raskopoulos) stand on a street corner and attempt to outdo each other with their knowledge of obscure "underground" bands and music. The sketches often become bizarre and absurd in a style reminiscent of Abbott and Costello's "Who's on First?". In a recent episode, they decided they need to come up with a new adjective other than "Underground"

=== Peter Cundall ===
Peter Cundall (Ilic) is another sketch involving the impersonation of a real person. Peter Cundall, a celebrity gardener, reads from famous novels but ends up being sidetracked by references to gardening and manure.

=== Jihadist Council of Australia ===
A terrorist (Raskopoulos) appears on a low quality video warning the Australian public. The warnings initially point to a terror attack ("Don't catch a train on Sunday") but in the end are revealed to come from genuine concern ("...There's going to be track work on the red line").

=== Arnie the Koala ===
Arnie (Franklin) is a drug addicted koala. The Arnie sketches feature nature documentary footage that has been dubbed with voices. The sketches are in reference to the fact that eucalyptus leaves have a doping effect when they are eaten.

=== Trevor and Dianne ===
Trevor (Franklin) and Dianne (Gage) are an elderly couple who enjoy caravanning. On their holidays they meet people who they bore and annoy with their barrage of tedious conversation.

=== That's Amazing ===
A parody of TV shows like Ripley's Believe it or Not and Guinness World Records hosted by an unnamed character played by James Pender. The sketches depict different people on the show performing tasks which are quite mundane. Nonetheless the studio audience is still enthralled and chant the phrase "That's Fucking Amazing" at the end of every sketch.

=== Mlak Mlak ===
(Voiced by Franklin; Illustrations by Raskopoulos) Mlak Mlak is a World Vision "sponsor child" in Africa. Every month he receives $1.50 from the 3rd Degree. He sends in drawings and letters describing what he has done with the money and usually complains about what a pittance it is. In recent episodes he has been shown as a gangster rapper named M-lak Daddy asking for "A Dollar Fiddy Cent", a play on his catchphrase and the rap artist 50 Cent, to help his malnourished backup singers get some "booty".

=== Try Hard Mum ===
A mother (Ward) attempts to be cool in front of her daughter (Fitzgerald) and her daughter's friend (Gage) but only succeeds in embarrassing herself by revealing how little she knows about the topic of conversation.

=== Sergei Haminov ===
Sergei Haminov (Raskopoulos) is Russia's Rubik's Cube champion. He appears in numerous adverts endorsing products and says to "put it in your hole". The products are Pseudo-Russian Bastardisations of well-known western products such as Schnickers (a parody of Snickers) and Kentucken Frucken Chicken (a parody of KFC). He also starred in two other ads that change his catchphrase to "put it on your pole". This has been for condoms and lubricant (called 'KBG Jelly' a parody of 'KY Jelly') . He recently featured in an ad for a Russian men's magazine, Rolph (a parody of Ralph). He has also endorsed a product called "Cocoa Poops" (a parody of Coco Pops).

=== Tank Mum ===
A mum just like any other, apart from the fact that she drives a tank. In one skit she drops her son and daughter off at primary school. They forget to take their lunches with them and the mum shoots it at them with the tank's cannon.

=== Red Man and Green Man ===
A set of pedestrian traffic light containing a Red Man (Pender), and Green Man (Raskopoulos). The Green Man is continually annoying the Red Man by making the "time to walk" noise at inappropriate times. For example, on their second appearance Green Man asks Red Man to swap places. Red Man initially refuses but then agrees. Green Man makes the "time to walk" noise and cars can be heard crashing afterwards. Red Man usually calls Green Man a dick.

=== Stephen Xerxes ===
Also known as The Finger Guy, Stephen (Pender) is a man who pretends to be pulling an object from his pocket but in facts flips off the person, followed by oohs and aahs. He generally performs this act to a figure of authority such as a bus ticket collector, a police woman, or a judge. Sometimes these sketches break character continuity. The character is generally depicted as a young man in a gray hoodie but has also been portrayed as a politician and a medieval knight.

=== Castaways ===
Three men have survived a plane crash at sea. Their names are Stan (Raskopoulos), Tom (Pender) and Kevin (Franklin). Tom and Stan have want to light a fire and set up help signals on the beach. Kevin says that they must turn to homosexuality to survive "for warmth and safety" and that there's no shame in this. He cuts his clothes to look like a woman's and changes their help sign to "Homo".

=== Proletariat Psycho ===
(Raskopoulos) A man who cuts up human flesh (similar to an Ivan Milat/Mick Taylor type character), and gives words of wisdom to the people at the same time.

=== NYPD ===
The New York City Police Department which features a tough, hardass chief (Raskopoulos), who actually has a heart of gold, and his main officer Kageti (Pender). Kageti is a good cop loose cannon who has to constantly deal with the aforementioned Chief. The Chief and Kageti both enjoy donuts but think that coffee tastes like shit.

== Recurring Themes ==
Not only are there recurring characters, there are also recurring themes in the show.

=== Things You Shouldn't Do Naked ===
These sketches begin by announcing an activity that should not be done whilst naked and assigning the activity a number. The sketches then depict one of the cast members performing the activity. The humour comes from the fact that the activities are things that should not be done at all, naked or otherwise such as eating a surfboard, towel whipping a bear or impersonating the Crazy Frog ring tone. According to the Season 1 DVD commentary, when Heath Franklin appears in one of these sketches he is the only actor to do his naked scenes in the nude, the rest of the cast wore flesh-coloured underwear.

=== Poofta Bogân ===
Poofta Bogân is a brand for the Australian bogân, who is also a bit gay. Items in the Poofta Bogân range include a cologne, dating web site pooftaboganmatchmaker.com.au, the Poofta Bogân Manwâgon (The Manwagon is a Smart Car with a tray on the back) and an alcoholic drink called "Inhibition".

=== Don't do Drugs ===
These sketches start off with sped-up black and white stock footage accompanied by frantic music and finish with the message "Don't do Drugs".

== Awards ==
In 2006, the show received a Logie nomination for Most Outstanding Comedy Series, and Franklin was nominated for the 2006 Inaugural Graham Kennedy Logie Award for Most Outstanding New Talent.

== Controversy ==
The Ronnie Johns Half Hour often featured risqué material on subjects such as sex and religion. The show often received complaints, particularly from religious groups.

=== Where did I come from? ===
The first episode of the series contained a sketch in which a father gave a very detailed description about his young son's conception when the son asked him "Where did I come from?" (which ended with line, "Then, I turkey-slapped [your mother] in the face!"). The sketch was all set to be broadcast, until shortly before the airing a controversial act involving genital slapping occurred on Big Brother. Since the sketch would have meant many complaints for the network, The 3rd Degree had to do a last-minute edit, with "Bunch of Flowers" being redubbed over the offending words. The uncensored version of the sketch was released online shortly after the first episode aired, and also appears under the Special Features on the DVD release of the series.

=== Jesus' mobile phone ===
One of the early sketches portrayed Jesus nailed to the cross having difficulty answering his mobile telephone. This generated a great number of complaints from Christian groups - according to the DVD commentary, Channel 10 received close to two hundred complaints. Several of these complaints claimed that the 3rd Degree "wouldn't dare do the same thing about Muslims". Two episodes later, they referred to these complaints and played an identical scene with Mohammed on the cross instead of Jesus, claiming it to be in the interests of equality.

=== High Five a Muslim Day ===
As part of the first Season, the Ronnie Johns Half Hour advertised a fictional Australian National Awareness Day, 28 February was announced as "High Five a Muslim Day". This event was heavily advertised on the show and the internet, with viewers encouraged to go out and find Muslims "or even people who just look like they're Muslims, 'cause they've been copping it too" and get happy with the schlappy. To this end, T-shirts and posters were printed and distributed around Australia at a variety of venues and events, including the Tropfest Film Festival.

Initially, Network Ten were reluctant to screen the episode due to the Jyllands-Posten Muhammad cartoons controversy. However the Ronnie Johns team consulted a number of prominent members of the Australian Islamic community with the sketch. The sketch was met with praise by Islamic leaders and the 3rd Degree were even given a fatwah by the Mufti of Australia decreeing that the sketch promoted tolerance and understanding.

The sketches began with a community announcement-style advertisement, where Jesus announced the day. This was followed up by a number of fake television commercials advertising the day and finally a montage of vox pops of the publics opinion towards High Five a Muslim day. At the end of the day when asked about the response the producers reported "T-shirts sold: 'A couple of hundred.' Complaints from Christians: Five. Complaints from Muslims: Nil."

=== Jihadi Joe ===
In this sketch, the Ronnie Johns team employed two children to act in a "G.I. Joe" style commercial for the "Jihadi Joe" action figure. The sketch involved two toy twin towers which the kids then crash a plane into and begin to celebrate (à la 9/11). The sketch then turns to heaven where Jihadi Joe is rewarded with 72 virgins.
