= Karl Chandler (comedian) =

Australian writer and entertainer

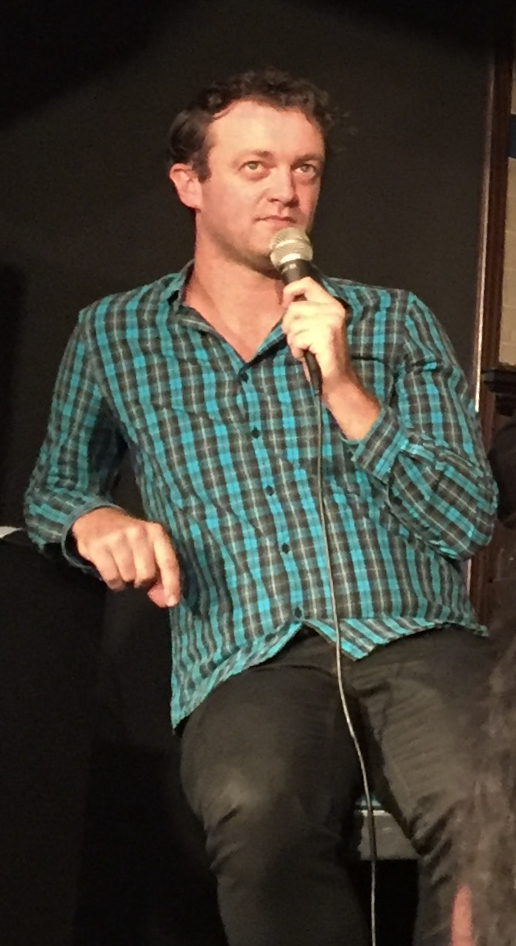
- At live recording of The Little Dum Dum Club 2017.
- Born: 30 March 1976 (age 49); Maryborough, Victoria, Australia
- Occupations: Writer and entertainer
- Website: karlchandler.com.au

Karl Chandler (born 30 March 1976) is an Australian writer and light entertainer. He used to co-host the popular comedy podcast The Little Dum Dum Club with Tommy Dassalo. Chandler grew up in the small rural Victorian town of Maryborough. He has written for many TV shows, like Hard Quiz, Spicks and Specks, and The Project, and written and been part of the cast for shows like Studio A.

In 2011, Chandler collated and published a book called Funny Buggers: The Best Lines from Australian Stand-up Comedy, a collection of jokes from iconic Australian comedians like as Greg Fleet, Tom Gleeson and Dave O'Neil.

In 2014, Chandler auditioned for Australia's Got Talent, but did not make it past the audition stage. This experience served as the basis of the material for his 2014 comedy hour, Karl Chandler's Got Talent.

Chandler has run many comedy rooms in Melbourne, such as Comedy at Spleen on Monday nights (previously co-run with Steele Saunders), Thursday Comedy Club on Thursday nights, and Basement Comedy Club on Saturday nights.

On 2 September 2017, Chandler married his then fiancée Diane, with whom he had been in a relationship for 10 years.

He is currently working on pre-production for Phunny Phellas, a comedy program for commercial television audiences.

== Stand-up shows ==
- 2014 – Karl Chandler's Got Talent
- 2015 – Karl Chandler - World's Greatest (and Best) Comedian
- 2016 – Karl Chandler Defends His Title As World's Greatest and Best Comedian
- 2017 – Karl Chandler: World's Best Comedian in the World
- 2018 – Karl Chandler's Shit List
- 2019 – One Man Comedy Factory
- 2020–21 – Please Call Me Karl, Mr. Comedy Was My Father

== Television writing credits ==
Year	Title	No. of episodes
2010	The White Room	2
2010	Good News Week	3
2011	The Back Room	1
2011-2020	The Project	1911
2012	You're Skitting Me	13
2013	This Week Live	13
2013	A League of Their Own	10
2014	Spicks and Specks	49
2014	This is Littleton	4
2015	Dirty Laundry Live	12
2017	20 to One	5
2017	Dr Karl's Outrageous Acts of Science	10
2018	The Weekly with Charlie Pickering	20
2018	Hard Quiz	21
2019	Squinters	6
2020	Kinne Tonight	7
