= Tommy Dassalo =

Australian comedian (born 1986)

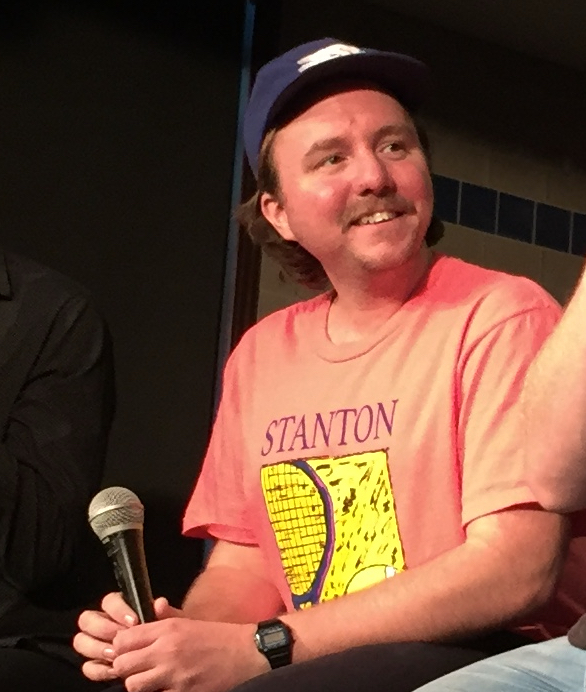
- Live at The Little Dum Dum Club podcast recording in 2017.
- Born: Thomas Howard Alsop; 28 August 1986 (age 40); Malvern, Victoria
- Occupation: Stand-up comedian
- Website: www.tommydassalo.com

Tommy Dassalo (born Thomas Howard Alsop) is a stand-up comedian and writer based in Melbourne, Australia. He co-hosted The Little Dum Dum Club, a comedy podcast with Karl Chandler. He now hosts the How to do Everything podcast and co-hosts the Filthy Casuals podcast with Ben Vernel.

== Early life ==
Dassalo was born as Thomas Alsop in 1986, and raised in the Eastern suburbs of Melbourne. He is an only child. At age nine, he was diagnosed with aplastic anemia, a rare bone marrow disease. This became the subject of his one-man stand-up show Pipsqueak in 2012.

== Career ==
Dassalo has worked as a semi-professional stand-up comedian, a writer, and an actor.

=== Stand-up ===
Dassalo has been performing stand-up comedy since he was 13 years old. He has performed thirteen one-man shows to date at the Melbourne International Comedy Festival.

He appeared as a guest host on Episode 51 of the Weekly Planet.

==== Notable stand-up shows ====
- 2010 - An Explosion of Colour
- 2011 - Buckwild
- 2012 - Pipsqueak
- 2016 - Little Golden Dassalo
- 2017 - Dinner For Two
- 2019 - Balding Cherub
- 2022 - Turtle Island
- 2023 - Scam Artist

=== Podcasts ===
In October 2010, Dassalo and Chandler began recording a weekly comedy podcast, The Little Dum Dum Club, to promote the work of fellow comedians. In September 2024, Dassalo announced that the podcast would not continue, due to a breakdown in working relationship between himself and Chandler. He is currently the host of Filthy Casuals, a video-game themed comedy podcast, featuring Ben Vernel. He previously hosted a sports podcast called You Beauty with his friend Sam Gray.

=== Writer credits (theatre) ===
- 2006 - I Heart Racism (with Dave Bushell)
- 2009 - All The Single Ladies (with Bart Freebairn)

=== Writer credits (television) ===
- 2009 - Talkin' 'Bout Your Generation
- 2014 - Fully Furnished (pilot) (with Tom Ballard)

=== Acting credits (television) ===
- 2015 - Fully Furnished (pilot)
