= Jordan Raskopoulos =

Australian comedian, actress and singer

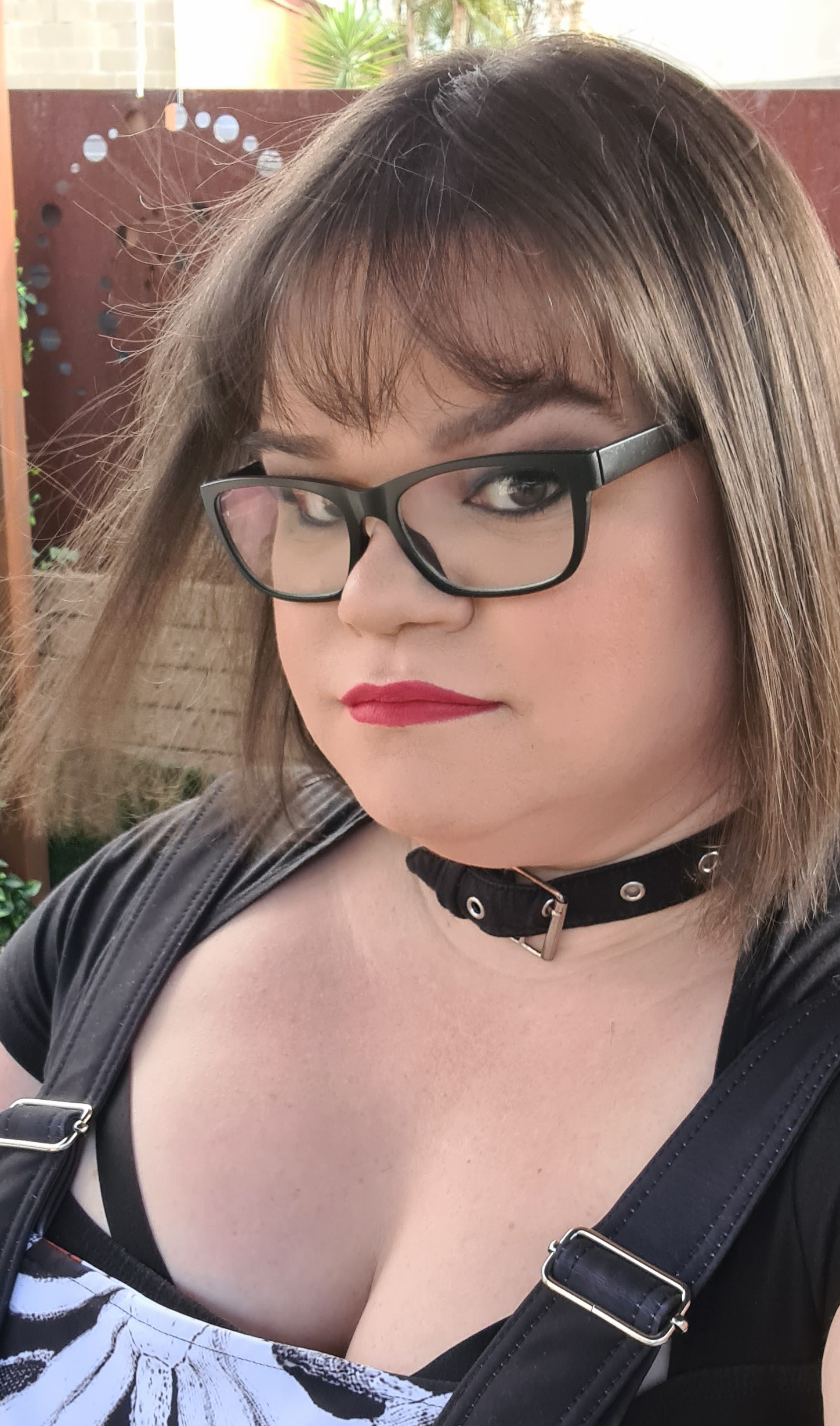
- Raskopoulos in 2022
- Born: Jordan Raskopoulos; Sydney, Australia
- Occupations: Comedian; actress; singer; television personality; streamer
- Known for: The Axis of Awesome; The Ronnie Johns Half Hour
- Father: Peter Raskopoulos
- Relatives: Steen Raskopoulos (brother)
- Website: jordanrasko.com

Jordan Nicola Bridget Raskopoulos is an Australian comedian, singer, and television personality. She wrote and performed the Network Ten sketch comedy show The Ronnie Johns Half Hour, and was lead singer for comedy rock group the Axis of Awesome (2006–2018). She came out as a transgender woman in 2016.

== Early life and education ==
Jordan Raskopoulos was born in Sydney, Australia. Her father is former footballer Peter Raskopoulos, and her brother is Steen Raskopoulos, a fellow comedian.

== Career ==
=== Comedy and acting ===
In 2003, Raskopoulos became involved with Impro Australia's Theatresports events including The Belvoir St Theatre Theatresports and the Cranston Cup competitions, winning state and national titles. In 2005, she became part of the university sketch comedy supergroup The 3rd Degree, who performed at the Melbourne International Comedy Festival. This group formed the base of the Network Ten's Logie award-winning cult ensemble sketch comedy television show The Ronnie Johns Half Hour, in which Raskopoulos starred and for which she wrote.

After the success of The Ronnie Johns Half Hour, Raskopoulos went on to appear in Stupid, Stupid Man, Stand Up Australia, Hole in the Wall, Good News Week and Thank God You're Here, and has provided voices for the ABC2 machinima series The Team. She was a team captain for a season of the SBS Television sports show The Squiz. In 2007, her debut solo stage show was called The Adventures of the Man with the Dominant Claw.

From 2006 until 2018, Raskopoulos fronted the award-winning musical comedy trio the Axis of Awesome, whose parody song "4 Chords" has received over 81 million hits on YouTube and is one of the highest-rated comedy videos on the site. The group came to attention after the release of their songs parodying the 2007 Australian federal election and received a Moosehead award at the 2008 Melbourne International Comedy Festival for their show The Axis of Awesome Comeback Spectacular. From 2009, the Axis of Awesome produced four albums and toured extensively in the United States, UK, Europe, Asia and Australia, with sold-out seasons at the Edinburgh Festival Fringe. After a hiatus in 2017, they officially announced they had broken up in 2018.

Raskopoulos was one of a cast of voice actors in the Australian comedy sci-fi feature film Lesbian Space Princess, which premiered at the Adelaide Film Festival in October 2024.

=== TV appearances ===
With the Axis of Awesome, Raskopoulos appeared on Q&A, Good News Week and The Footy Show. In 2022, she appeared on Question Everything.

=== Writing and streaming ===
Prior to publicly coming out as a trans woman in 2016, Raskopoulos wrote articles on transgender issues for Junkee under the pseudonym Nicola Fierce.

Raskopoulos also streams on YouTube and Twitch under the username JordanRasko. On April 26, 2020, Raskopoulos posted a video featuring a parody song titled "We Built This Clitty," a parody of Starship's "We Built This City." The content of the song centers around Raskopoulos' personal experience with Gender Reassignment Surgery, employing humour as a narrative element. As of 5 February 2024, the video had accumulated 11,187 views and garnered 399 likes.

=== Logies controversy ===
Raskopoulos was cast in the supporting role of Trax in the 2012 movie Underground: The Julian Assange Story along with Rachel Griffiths, Anthony LaPaglia and Alex Williams. In January 2013, Raskopoulos requested users of the internet forum Something Awful to vote for her in the most popular actor category of the 2013 Logie Awards, promising in return to allow site users to write her acceptance speech. Some news outlets characterised this as "hacking" the Logies, as Raskopoulos, who despite a high-profile international comedy career was relatively unknown in Australian acting circles. Raskopoulos herself described her campaign as no different to any ordinary "fan" campaign.

== Personal life ==
Raskopoulos is a transgender lesbian. She publicly came out as transgender in 2016 in a video called "What's Happened To Jordan's Beard" revealing that she got rid of her beard in February 2015 and that it would never come back as she was now transgender. She kept her given name but added the middle names Nicola and Bridget.

She has attention deficit hyperactivity disorder and spoke about her anxiety disorder at a TEDx talk in 2017.

Raskopoulos plays roller derby and has played Warhammer 40,000 since she was 12 years old.

== Filmography ==
=== Film ===
| Year | Title | Role | Notes |
|---|---|---|---|
| 2012 | Underground: The Julian Assange Story | Trax | |
| 2019 | I Am Woman | George Sylvia | |
| 2025 | Lesbian Space Princess | Queen Leanne | Voice |

=== Television ===
| Year | Title | Role | Notes |
|---|---|---|---|
| 2005–2006 | The Ronnie Johns Half Hour | Various characters | 26 episodes |
| 2006 | The Team | Benedict | Voice |
| 2008 | Stupid, Stupid Man | Clown Boy | Episode: "The Fifteenth Floor" |
| 2013 | #7DaysLater | Father O'Rielly / Herb / Dog Whisperer | 3 episodes |
| 2014 | In a Woman's World | Toby | Episode: "Picking Up" |
| 2014 | Clean and Jerk | Richie | Television film |
| 2015 | About Tonight | The Axis of Awesome - Host | Episode: "May the Fourth Be with You" |
| 2015 | How Not to Behave | Ensemble Cast | 2 episodes |
| 2016 | The Wizards of Aus | Marvolo | Episode: "Molten Gelatinous Sex Ball" |
| 2021 | Wakefield | Anne | Episode #1.3 |
| 2022 | Question Everything | Herself | Season 2, episode 3 |
