= How Not to Behave =

Australian television series

- Genre: Comedy
- Presented by: Gretel Killeen; Matt Okine
- Country of origin: Australia
- Original language: English
- No. of seasons: 1
- No. of episodes: 15

Production
- Executive producers: Sophia Mogford; Jennifer Collins; Sophia Zachariou
- Production company: Screentime

Original release
- Network: ABC
- Release: 15 July – 28 October 2015

How Not to Behave was an Australian comedy series on ABC, hosted by Gretel Killeen and Matt Okine. The 15–part series was based on a Swedish format which examines etiquette and manners. It premiered on 15 July 2015.

== Episodes ==
| No. | Title | Guest | Original release date | Australian viewers |
|---|---|---|---|---|
| 1 | "Public Places" | Linda Gregoriou | 15 July 2015 | 536,000 |
| 2 | "Travel and Transport" | Lawrence Mooney | 22 July 2015 | N/A |
| 3 | "Love and Dating" | Bettina Arndt | 29 July 2015 | 403,000 |
| 4 | "Kids and Parenting" | Dave O'Neil | 5 August 2015 | 524,000 |
| 5 | "Social Media" | Joel Creasey | 12 August 2015 | 509,000 |
| 6 | "Sport and Recreation" | Merv Hughes | 19 August 2015 | 481,000 |
| 7 | "Births, Deaths and Weddings" | Vanessa Jeffrey | 26 August 2015 | 494,000 |
| 8 | "Workplace" | Ian "Dicko" Dickson | 2 September 2015 | 430,000 |
| 9 | "Body" | Paul De Gelder | 9 September 2015 | 490,000 |
| 10 | "Money" | Tom Gleeson | 23 September 2015 | 472,000 |
| 11 | "Dinner and Parties" | Matt Moran | 30 September 2015 | 476,000 |
| 12 | "Family" | Christine Anu | 7 October 2015 | 476,000 |
| 13 | "Appearance and Fashion" | Tim Chappel | 14 October 2015 | 520,000 |
| 14 | "Neighbours" | Myf Warhurst | 21 October 2015 | 506,000 |
| 15 | "Technology" | Tom Ballard | 28 October 2015 | 196,000 |
