= The Axis of Awesome =

Australian musical comedy act

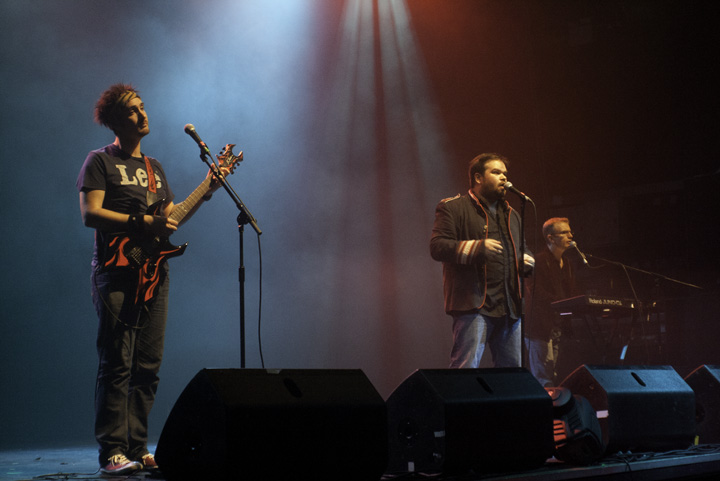
- The Axis of Awesome (left to right: Lee Naimo, Jordan Raskopoulos, Benny Davis) performing c. 2011

Background information
- Origin: Sydney, Australia
- Genre: Comedy rock
- Years active: 2006–2018
- Past members: Jordan Raskopoulos (lead vocals); Lee Naimo (guitar, vocals); Benny Davis (vocals, keyboard)
- Website: www.axisofawesome.net

The Axis of Awesome were an Australian comedy music act with members Jordan Raskopoulos, Lee Naimo and Benny Davis, active from 2006 to 2018. The trio covered a wide variety of performance styles and performed a combination of original material and pop parodies.

== History ==
The Axis of Awesome formed in 2006, their name being a play on the phrase "axis of evil" used by United States President George W. Bush. The trio were heavily involved in improv theatre at the University of Sydney and decided to try something different. The band played at a few stand-up comedy nights and improv events in Sydney and performed a fortnightly segment on FBi Radio, but got their first big break when they released a number of rap parodies lampooning the 2007 Australian Federal Election.

The band gained further success performing in the Melbourne International Comedy Festival and making television and radio appearances. Their 2008 Melbourne International Comedy Festival show, titled "The Axis of Awesome Comeback Spectacular", received a Moosehead Award. They took the show to the Edinburgh Fringe in 2008 where it was received with critical and audience acclaim.

After the Edinburgh festival, the Axis of Awesome's song "4 Chords", a medley of 36 pop songs that all contain the same basic chord structure, received airplay on BBC Radio 1. This airplay drove listeners to the internet and "4 Chords" went viral, receiving millions of views on YouTube. The success on YouTube prompted increased interest, both home and abroad, and the Axis performed the song on many radio and television programs, including Nova 96.9, Triple M, The Footy Show, Good News Week and 9am with David & Kim.

In April 2009, the Axis of Awesome performed at the Melbourne International Comedy Festival with a new show, the Axis of Awesome vs Bee. The show wove the band's songs into a narrative involving a giant bee. The Axis of Awesome vs Bee was also performed at the Sydney Comedy Festival (formerly the Cracker Comedy Festival) in May 2009.

The Axis toured regional Queensland and New South Wales as part of the Melbourne Comedy festival roadshow and performed at the Adelaide Cabaret Festival in May and June. They returned to the Edinburgh fringe in August with a new sell-out show "The Axis of Awesome: Infinity Rock Explosion" and appeared at the World's Funniest Island festival in Sydney in October.

In February 2010, the Axis of Awesome released their second album, Infinity Rock Explosion!, and performed sold out seasons at the Adelaide Fringe Festival, the Melbourne International Comedy Festival, the Sydney Comedy Festival and the Singapore Flipside Festival. They received the Time Out award for best local talent at the Sydney comedy festival and recorded their first DVD, The Axis of Awesome Live, which was released in Australia on 6 October 2010 by Punchline and Beyond Entertainment.

They returned to the Edinburgh Festival again in 2014 with their new show "Viva La Vida Loca Las Vegas".

In February 2016, Raskopoulos publicly came out as transgender in a video called "What's happened to Jordan's beard". She was pleasantly surprised by the "overwhelmingly positive" public reaction. Their album released that year, Viva La Vida Loca Las Vegas, features a cover of Against Me!'s "Transgender Dysphoria Blues".

In August 2018, the band announced on Facebook that they would no longer be performing together as the Axis of Awesome. The group had taken a break the year prior and later decided to make the break permanent.

== Discography ==
=== Albums ===
- Scissors, Paper, Rock! (2008)
- Infinity Rock Explosion! (2010)
- Animal Vehicle (2011)
- The Swimsuit Area (2012)
- Cry Yourself a River (2012)
- Christmawesome (2013)
- Viva La Vida Loca Las Vegas (2016)

=== Singles ===
List of singles, with selected chart positions, showing year released and album name
Title	Year	Peak chart positions	Album
Title	Year	UK	Album
"Four Chords"	2011	175	Animal Vehicle

== Awards ==
- Melbourne International Comedy Festival Moosehead Award 2008
- Time Out Sydney Comedy Festival Best Australian Act Award 2010
- Time Out Sydney Best Comedy Show 2010–2011
- Online Video Awards Best YouTube Channel 2014

== "Four Chords" ==
"Four Chords" is the Axis of Awesome's best-known work. It is a medley of popular songs, set to the I–V–vi–IV progression. Many of the songs selected do not actually follow this four-chord progression, and some of the ones that do include it only briefly. Since these four chords are played as an ostinato, the band also used a vi–IV–I–V, usually from the song "Save Tonight" to the song "Torn". The band played the song in the key of D (E in the live performances on YouTube), so the progression they used is D–A–Bm–G (E, B, C#m, A on the live performances). Most of the songs were transposed from their original keys.

The band continually varied the songs comprising the medley, often incorporating new releases. The Axis' song "Birdplane" (itself a parody of the Five for Fighting song "Superman") was always included, as well as "Down Under" by the Australian band Men at Work. The medley usually started with Journey's "Don't Stop Believin'". The song always concluded with the chorus of "Scar" (by Missy Higgins), except with the final line changed from "Could you leave me with a scar?" to "That's all it takes to be a star" (referring to the four chords themselves).

On 20 July 2011, the Axis of Awesome released an official music video for "Four Chords" on their YouTube channel.

Songs in the official music video:

1. Journey – "Don't Stop Believin'"
2. James Blunt – "You're Beautiful"
3. The Black Eyed Peas – "Where Is the Love?"
4. Alphaville – "Forever Young"
5. Jason Mraz – "I'm Yours"
6. Train – "Hey, Soul Sister"
7. The Calling – "Wherever You Will Go"
8. Elton John – "Can You Feel the Love Tonight"
9. Akon – "Don't Matter"
10. John Denver – "Take Me Home, Country Roads"
11. Lady Gaga – "Paparazzi"
12. U2 – "With or Without You"
13. The Last Goodnight – "Pictures of You"
14. Maroon 5 – "She Will Be Loved"
15. The Beatles – "Let It Be"
16. Bob Marley – "No Woman, No Cry"
17. Marcy Playground – "Sex and Candy"
18. Men at Work – "Down Under"
19. Jill Colucci – "The Funny Things You Do" (theme from America's Funniest Home Videos)
20. Jack Johnson – "Taylor"
21. Spice Girls – "2 Become 1"
22. A-ha – "Take On Me"
23. Green Day – "When I Come Around"
24. Eagle-Eye Cherry – "Save Tonight"
25. Toto – "Africa"
26. Beyoncé – "If I Were a Boy"
27. Kelly Clarkson – "Behind These Hazel Eyes"
28. Jason Derulo – "In My Head"
29. The Smashing Pumpkins – "Bullet with Butterfly Wings"
30. Joan Osborne – "One of Us"
31. Avril Lavigne – "Complicated"
32. The Offspring – "Self Esteem"
33. The Offspring – "You're Gonna Go Far, Kid"
34. Akon – "Beautiful"
35. OneRepublic – "Apologize"
36. Eminem featuring Rihanna – "Love the Way You Lie"
37. Bon Jovi – "It's My Life"
38. Lady Gaga – "Poker Face"
39. Aqua – "Barbie Girl"
40. Red Hot Chili Peppers – "Otherside"
41. The Gregory Brothers – "Double Rainbow Song"
42. MGMT – "Kids"
43. Sarah Brightman & Andrea Bocelli – "Time to Say Goodbye"
44. Robert Burns – "Auld Lang Syne"
45. Five for Fighting – "Superman (It's Not Easy)"
46. The Axis of Awesome – "Birdplane"
47. Missy Higgins – "Scar"

Other songs that have been played in the medley:

1. Alex Lloyd – "Amazing"
2. Richard Marx – "Right Here Waiting"
3. Adele – "Someone like You"
4. Christina Perri – "Jar of Hearts"
5. Crowded House – "Fall at Your Feet"
6. Red Hot Chili Peppers – "Under the Bridge"
7. Rihanna – "Take a Bow"
8. Daryl Braithwaite – "The Horses"
9. Pink – "U + Ur Hand"
10. The Fray – "You Found Me"
11. 3OH!3 – "Don't Trust Me"
12. Tim Minchin – "Canvas Bags"
13. Blink-182 – "Dammit"
14. Kasey Chambers – "Not Pretty Enough"
15. Alicia Keys – "No One"
16. Amiel – "Lovesong"
17. Bush – "Glycerine"
18. Thirsty Merc – "20 Good Reasons"
19. Lighthouse Family – "High"
20. Red Hot Chili Peppers – "Soul to Squeeze"
21. Banjo Paterson – "Waltzing Matilda"
22. Bic Runga – "Sway"
23. Ben Lee – "Cigarettes Will Kill You"
24. Michael Jackson – "Man in the Mirror"
25. Mika – "Happy Ending"
26. The Cranberries – "Zombie"
27. Natalie Imbruglia – "Torn"
28. Miley Cyrus – "Wrecking Ball"
29. Imagine Dragons – "Demons"
30. Idina Menzel – "Let It Go"
31. Rihanna feat. Calvin Harris – "We Found Love"
32. Avicii – "Wake Me Up"
33. Flo Rida – "Whistle"
34. The Script feat. will.i.am – "Hall of Fame"
35. Carson, Christopher, and James – "Always on My Mind"
36. Die Ärzte – "Manchmal haben Frauen"
37. Iyaz – "Replay"
38. Robert Stanley Weir – "O Canada"

== See also ==
- List of songs containing the I–V–vi–IV progression
