= Justin Kennedy =

Australian actor

Justin Kennedy is an Australian actor, writer, voice-over artist and comedian from Melbourne.

== Career ==
Justin Kennedy started his performing career in 2002, after making his first stand-up appearance in the national Raw Comedy competition.

In 2003, Kennedy teamed up with fellow comedians Gavin Baskerville and Dwight Bandy to write and perform the show Successful Losing: How to be a Spectacular Failure in both Fringe World in Perth, Western Australia, (winning 'Best Comedy'), and the Melbourne International Comedy Festival (MICF). In 2004, Kennedy performed his first solo stand-up show in MICF, Simple Pleasures, which he followed over the next four years with I'm With Stupid, Beelzebuzz (nominated for a Golden Gibbo Award), Ladies...? and Passionista.

In 2009, Kennedy teamed up with Sarah Collins to write and perform, Donna and Damo: An Asexual Love Story for the Melbourne Fringe Festival before performing it at the Arts Centre in the 2010 MICF. He proposed to Collins onstage during the curtain call of a performance in April 2010.

In 2008, Kennedy wrote and performed as a cast member of Foxtel's The Mansion with Michael Chamberlin and Charlie Pickering. He appeared three times on Foxtel's Stand Up Australia. He was a regular writer for Rove from 2007 until its final episode, appearing in numerous sketches during this time.

Kennedy has appeared as an actor in numerous television shows, including The Time of Our Lives, The Secret, It's a Date and Utopia, as well as voiced characters for the animated series' Sumo Mouse, Flea-Bitten and SheZow.

Kennedy was formerly head writer at The Project and now writes for Hard Quiz and The Weekly with Charlie Pickering.

== Select filmography ==
- Rove
- The Mansion
- Stand Up Australia
- The Secret
- Neighbours
- Stingers
- Reverse Runner
