= AACTA Award for Best Light Entertainment Television Series =

Australian television award

The Australian Film Institute Award for Best Light Entertainment Television Series is awarded annually by the Australian Film Institute as part of the awards in television for excellence in light entertainment. The award commenced in 2003.

== Best Light Entertainment Television Series ==
Year	Winner	Recipient(s)	Network	Other nominees
2003	Enough Rope with Andrew Denton	Andrew Denton; Anita Jacoby	ABC TV	
2004	Enough Rope with Andrew Denton	Andrew Denton; Anita Jacoby	ABC TV	
2005	The Glass House	Ted Robinson	ABC TV	
2006	Enough Rope with Andrew Denton	Anita Jacoby; Andrew Denton	ABC TV	
2007	RocKwiz	Brian Nankervis; Ken Connor; Peter Bain-Hogg; Joe Connor	SBS	
2008	Enough Rope with Andrew Denton	Andrew Denton; Anita Jacoby	ABC1	
2009	Spicks and Specks	Anthony Watt	ABC1	
2010	The Gruen Transfer	Andrew Denton; Anita Jacoby; Jon Casimir; Debbie Cuell	ABC1	Hungry Beast - Andrew Denton, Anita Jacoby (ABC TV); MasterChef Australia - Margaret Bashfield, Judy Smart, Caroline Spencer (Network Ten); Talkin' 'Bout Your Generation - Peter Beck (Network Ten)
2011	The Gruen Transfer	Andrew Denton, Anita Jacoby, Jon Casimir	ABC1	Hungry Beast - Andrew Denton, Anita Jacoby, Andy Nehl, Jon Casimir (ABC1); Judith Lucy's Spiritual Journey - Todd Abbott (ABC1); Junior MasterChef Australia - Tara McWilliams (Network Ten); RocKwiz - Brian Nankervis, Ken Connor, Peter Bain-Hogg, Joe Connor (SBS)
2012	Agony Aunts	Adam Zwar, Nicole Minchin	ABC1	Adam Hills in Gordon Street Tonight - Rachel Millar, Adam Hills, Bruce Kane (ABC1); Gruen Sweat - Anita Jacoby, Andrew Denton, Jon Casimir, Debbie Cuell (ABC1); The Hamster Wheel - Andy Nehl (ABC1)
2013	Please Like Me	Todd Abbott	ABC2	The Agony of Life - Adam Zwar, Nicole Minchin, Amanda Brotchie (ABC1); Gruen Nation - Sophia Zachariou, Jo Wathen, Wil Anderson, Jon Casimir (ABC1); Shaun Micallef's Mad as Hell - Peter Beck, Shaun Micallef (ABC1); Upper Middle Bogan - Robyn Butler, Wayne Hope (ABC1)
2014	Hamish & Andy's Gap Year: South America	Tim Bartley, Sophia Mogford, Frank Bruzzese, and Ryan Shelton	Nine Network	The Checkout – Julian Morrow, Nick Murray, and Martin Robertson (ABC); Paddock to Plate – Rod Parker (Foxtel - Lifestyle); The Project – Craig Campbell (Network Ten)
2015	The Weekly with Charlie Pickering	Charlie Pickering, Kevin Whyte, Chris Walker, Frank Bruzzese	ABC1	Dirty Laundry Live - Tarni James, Peter Lawler, Rachel Millar, Richard Kelly (ABC1); Judith Lucy Is All Woman - Anna Bateman, Judith Lucy (ABC1); Julia Zemiro's Home Delivery - Damian Davis, Polly Connolly, Nick Murray (ABC1)

== See also ==
- Australian Film Institute
- AFI Awards
- Australian Film Institute Television Awards
