= The Checkout =

Australian consumer affairs show

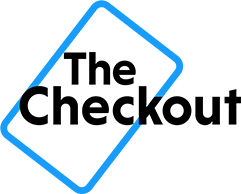
- The sixth and final series logo
- Genre: Consumer affairs, comedy, satire
- Written by: Julian Morrow; Craig Reucassel; Kirsten Drysdale; Kate Browne; Zoe Norton Lodge; Ben Jenkins; Scott Abbot; Richard Cooke; Alex Lee
- Directed by: Nathan Earl; Aaron Smith
- Presented by: Julian Morrow; Craig Reucassel; Kirsten Drysdale; Kate Browne; Zoe Norton Lodge; Ben Jenkins; Scott Abbot; Richard Cooke; Alex Lee
- Starring: Julian Morrow; Craig Reucassel; Kirsten Drysdale; Kate Browne; Zoe Norton Lodge; Ben Jenkins; Scott Abbot; Richard Cooke
- Composer: Drew Crawford
- Country of origin: Australia
- Original language: English
- No. of series: 6
- No. of episodes: 74

Production
- Executive producers: Julian Morrow; Nick Murray
- Producer: Chas Licciardello
- Production locations: Australian Broadcasting Corporation, Ultimo, New South Wales
- Editors: Andrew Glover; Dylan Behan; Kate Deegan
- Running time: 30 minutes
- Production company: Giant Dwarf Pty. Ltd.

Original release
- Network: ABC
- Release: 21 March 2013 – 17 April 2018

Related
- The Chaser's War on Everything; The Hamster Wheel; Hungry Beast

The Checkout is an Australian consumer affairs television series. The show's first series of 10 episodes premiered on 21 March 2013 on the Australian Broadcasting Corporation (ABC) television station ABC TV. A second series consisting of 16 episodes commenced airing on 20 February 2014. On 9 April 2015, a third series consisting of 12 episodes began airing. The series was renewed for a fourth series, which began airing on 7 April 2016 consisting of 12 episodes. The series returned for a fifth series, airing twelve episodes between 6 April 2017 and 29 June 2017. The Checkout, with a new look, logo, opening theme and art, still retaining original cast and segments, returned for a sixth season on 30 January 2018.

In July 2018, the series was cancelled, with the ABC's head of non-scripted production citing "budget cuts and the relatively high cost of making the show" as the reason for its cancellation.

== Premise ==
The Checkout features segments that examine the practices and methods of manufacturers, retailers, service providers and advertisers. Using a humorous style, the show highlights practices that are misleading, dishonest, unfair or occasionally even illegal or unethical. Often segments will target types of services or products rather than individual brands or companies. Examples include a segment on overpriced Wi-Fi services offered in certain hotels, the lack of scientific proof for the health benefits claimed by manufacturers of complementary medicines, and the concept of peer-to-peer lending.

Some segments take aim at specific brands and companies. One example was directed at Cadbury and their Joyville campaign which promoted a 10% increase (from 200 gm to 220 gm) in the size of the family blocks of chocolate which The Checkout portrayed as ironic given that Cadbury had previously reduced the blocks by 20% from 250 gm to 200 gm. Another was on Anaconda Mountain Bikes which are sold as such but are actually built for road-use only.

The show also includes the segment 'F U Tube' that allow viewers to upload their own queries or complaints about goods or services they have purchased. The program is associated with Choice magazine.

== Series overview ==
Season	Episodes	Originally released	
Season	Episodes	First released	Last released
1	10	21 March 2013	30 May 2013
2	16	20 February 2014	10 July 2014
3	12	9 April 2015	2 July 2015
4	12	7 April 2016	29 September 2016
5	12	6 April 2017	29 June 2017
6	12	30 January 2018	17 April 2018

== Lawsuits ==
The ABC was sued by Avni Sali for defamation over a segment on Swisse products. The ABC stood by the segment. Justice David Beach refused to strike out the case, finding that it was "not without real prospects of success". The matter eventually settled out of court.

The ABC also faced legal action over a segment on A2 milk with the a2 Milk Company claiming that the segment contains a number of "inaccuracies, misrepresentations and omissions". The A2 Milk company's case was based on the Competition and Consumer Act which does not typically apply to the ABC. However, the company argued that "advertising for the program constitutes 'engaging in commerce'."

== Reception ==
Paul McIntyre at AdNews wrote in 2014 that the show had "blown up marketing's new world order".

Juliette Hughes at the Australian Catholic Office for broadcasting wrote (in 2013) "The Checkout retains some of the verve and righteous anger of The Chaser, indeed could almost be said to be knocking over a few of the moneychangers' tables in what passes for today's secular temples, the premises ....of revered corporations."

Gordon Farrer, for The Sydney Morning Herald, wrote, "Typical bloody lefty pinko commie ABC, launching yet another assault on Things That Good People Hold Dear.....Humph. If you accept The Checkout's view of the world, marketing and advertising are industries out of control, full of charlatans, unfair restrictions on consumers, misrepresentation and outright lies about products of less-than-essential value to human existence."

== Nominations ==
The Super Foods segment in an episode of the first series of The Checkout was a finalist in the 2013 Eureka Prize for Scientific Journalism. The segment investigated foods promoted as ultra-healthy.

The Checkout was nominated for Best Light Entertainment Television Series at the 4th AACTA Awards, and for Most Outstanding Entertainment Program at the 2015 Logie Awards.

== DVD releases ==
The Complete Series 1 and 2 box set was released on 3 December 2014.
