= Zoe Norton Lodge =

Australian writer and television presenter

Zoe Norton Lodge is an Australian writer and television presenter.

== Career ==
Zoe Norton Lodge is known for her work on ABC's satirical comedy programs The Hamster Wheel, and The Checkout. With Ben Jenkins she created the comedy show Story Club which became an ABC TV series in 2015. Norton Lodge, along with Kirsten Drysdale, wrote and presented The Checkout's segment, 'Gendered Marketing,' an analysis of sexism inherent in the way products are advertised, and 'What To Reject When You're Expecting,' a series on bogus pregnancy products. She was also a presenter on The Chaser election specials. Norton Lodge has also appeared as a guest on Win the Week, Plonk, The Elegant Gentleman's Guide to Knife Fighting, The Letdown and The Moodys.

In 2018-19, she was a regular presenter on Triple M, and has also presented on ABC Radio Sydney and Radio National.

In 2018, she co-wrote the Ding Dong I'm Gay web series with Tim Spencer. The series won an Australian Writer’s Guild AWGIE Award in 2021

In 2020 she hosted the ABC show Reputation Rehab with Kirsten Drysdale, looking at the culture around public shame.

Norton Lodge has published a collection of short stories 'Almost Sincerely' and collaborated with her sister Georgia Norton Lodge, an illustrator, on four children's books in the Elizabella series.

In 2023, she co-developed the six-part BBC One comedy series Queen of Oz, starring English comedian Catherine Tate as the scandalous Princess Georgiana, a disgraced member of a fictional British Royal Family sent to rule Australia. She also co-wrote the episode titled "They Used to Oink at Me".

She is the Executive Producer and Series Editor for 'The Art Of..', a weekly arts television show, hosted by Namila Benson, that began airing on ABC TV (Australian TV channel) in June 2024. 'The Art Of...' is also broadcast on demand via ABC iView.

== Bibliography ==
- Almost Sincerely (2015)
- Elizabella Meets Her Match (2018)
- Welcome to Story Club (2018, with Ben Jenkins)
- Elizabella and the Great Tuckshop Takeover (2019)
- Elizabella and the Haunting of Lizard Lake (2020)
- Elizabella Breaks A Leg (2020)

== Television writing credits ==
Year	Title	Notes
2012	The Hamster Wheel	Additional writing
2013	The Hamster Decides	Additional writing
2013–2015	The Checkout	39 episodes
2014–2015	The Chaser's Media Circus	20 episodes
2016	The Chaser's Election Desk	5 episodes
2017	The Letdown	Additional writing
2019	Skit Box	Developed by
2020	Ding Dong I'm Gay	6 episodes
2020	Reputation Rehab	8 episodes
2023	Class of '07	
2023	We Interrupt This Broadcast	10 episodes
2023	Year Of	
2023	Queen of Oz	Episode: "They Used to Oink at Me"; also co-developed by

== Personal life ==
She is married and has two children.
