= Story Club =

Australian television comedy series

- Genre: Comedy
- Created by: Zoë Norton Lodge, Ben Jenkins
- Directed by: Angus Morgan
- Country of origin: Australia
- No. of seasons: 1
- No. of episodes: 9

Production
- Executive producers: Julian Morrow, Craig Reucassel

Original release
- Network: ABC2
- Release: 7 January – 4 March 2015

Story Club is an Australian television comedy show broadcast on the Australian Broadcasting Corporation (ABC) television station ABC2. It was a filmed version of a stage show that ran in Sydney. Cast members and guests sat in big chair with a big book and told a story.

Story Club was created by Zoë Norton Lodge and Ben Jenkins, dating back to 2009 at Sydney University’s Hermann’s Bar. It moved around to other venues before finding a permanent placement at the Chaser’s Giant Dwarf Theatre which was where the TV series was recorded.

== Episodes ==
1. Zoe Norton Lodge & Ian 'Dicko' Dickson
2. Ben Jenkins & Jonathan Holmes
3. Ben Jenkins & Pat Magee
4. David Cunningham & Alex Lee
5. Zoe Norton Lodge, Phil Spencer & Mark Sutton
6. Rob Carlton & Mark Sutton
7. Lewis Hobba & Cait Harris
8. Zoe Norton Lodge & Richard Cooke
9. Zoe Norton Lodge & Alex Lee
