= Kirsten Drysdale =

Australian television presenter and journalist

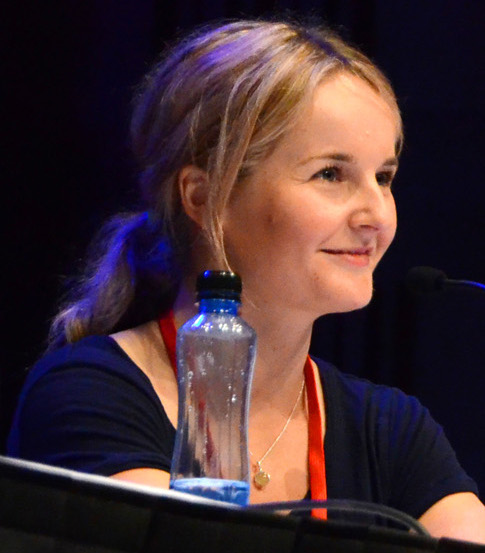
- Drysdale at Australian Skeptics National Convention 2014
- Born: Kirsten Kathleen Drysdale; 1984 (age 41–42); Mackay, Queensland, Australia
- Occupations: Television presenter, journalist, actor
- Notable work: Hungry Beast, The Checkout, The Chaser's Election Desk

Kirsten Kathleen Drysdale (born 1984) is an Australian television presenter and journalist.

Drysdale was born and raised in Mackay, Queensland.

Before beginning her career at the ABC, Drysdale worked for a production company in Brisbane that produced documentaries and multimedia for museums and exhibitions. During this time, she was also pursuing a sporting career, playing hockey for the Queensland Scorchers. After suffering an injury, she successfully applied for a position in the ABC television comedy and current affairs programme, Project NEXT, which was later renamed Hungry Beast.

She was a researcher and presenter for Hungry Beast and a researcher for The Hamster Wheel, The Hamster Decides and The Gruen Transfer. She has also occasionally appeared on Radio National, where she hosted Talking Shop, a weekly consumer psychology program. The series ended on 5 August 2014. Drysdale has also written for Crikey, The Feed (Australian TV series) and The Global Mail. She was a writer and one of the main presenters on the ABC consumer affairs comedy programme, The Checkout. In 2020 Drysdale co-hosted Reputation Rehab with Zoe Norton Lodge, a TV series discussing the rehabilitation of reputations of people caught in scandals and controversies.

Drysale's memoir, I Built No Schools in Kenya: A Year of Unmitigated Madness, was published in January 2019 by Vintage Australia.

In 2024, Drysale begun a YouTube channel "The Internet, Reviewed", focusing on episodic reviews of Internet personalities.

== Personal life ==
Drysdale has three children, the third of which was named Methamphetamine Rules. She had chosen the name to test whether New South Wales Births, Deaths and Marriages, a public registry, would accept and record the name, which it did. She has since changed his name to something "normal" but has chosen not to reveal it.
