= The Mansion (TV series) =

- Genre: Situation comedy
- Directed by: Dan Ilic; Peter Lawler
- Starring: Charlie Pickering; Michael Chamberlin; Kate McLennan; Justin Kennedy
- Country of origin: Australia
- Original language: English

Production
- Executive producers: Andy McIntyre; Darren Chau(the Comedy Channel); Graham Burrells (Foxtel)
- Producer: Paul Horan

Original release
- Network: Comedy
- Release: 3 April 2008

The Mansion is an Australian television comedy based upon news and current affairs. It is hosted by Michael Chamberlin and Charlie Pickering and features Kate McLennan and Justin Kennedy, It premiered on The Comedy Channel on Thursday 3 April 2008 at 8:30 pm.

The fictional backstory of The Mansion is that its previous host of The Mansion was one of the word's richest and most sexually potent news magnates, Jebediah McNews. The series finale of the Mansion aired on 19 June 2008 with a 'best of' episode airing on 26 June.
