= Veronica Milsom =

Australian radio presenter

- Born: Veronica Louise Milsom; 9 October 1984 (age 42); Geelong, Victoria, Australia
- Occupations: Radio presenter; actress; comedian; model

Veronica Louise Milsom (born 9 October 1984) is an Australian radio presenter, comedian and actress. From 2014 to 2020, she co-hosted the afternoon drive-time programme Veronica & Lewis alongside Lewis Hobba on youth radio station Triple J.

== Life and education ==
Milsom grew up in Geelong, Victoria, and has three siblings. Milsom attended the same high school in Geelong as her Hungry Beast and Triple J co-host, Lewis Hobba. After graduating from The Geelong College, Milsom studied at the West Australian Academy of Performing Arts.

== Personal life ==
Milsom gave birth to a daughter, Lila, in 2017. Her experience of motherhood is the basis for her 2019 solo stage performance Parent Virgin.

== Career ==
Milsom is best known as a co-host of the Triple J radio station program Veronica & Lewis, presenting from 2014 to 2020 In 2016, she was shortlisted for female Radio Presenter of the Year at the Cosmopolitan Women of the Year Award.

Milsom wrote for, and appeared in, the satirical current affairs program Hungry Beast. Milsom has appeared on ABC television shows, including 44 episodes of Shaun Micallef's Mad as Hell, Back Seat Drivers, and It's a Date, as well as Channel Ten's The Project and A League of Their Own (Australian game show).

ABC TV and Screen Australia commissioned Milsom to co-write and perform in The Record, a mockumentary series she created, which was shortlisted for the Australian Online Video Awards. The project became a short film, The Record: World’s Largest Family, co-written by Milsom and Steen Raskapoulos, which has screened at Manchester, Palm Springs and LA Webfest film festivals. Milsom has also acted in The Angus Project on ABC iView.

Milsom is also a playwright. Porky Pies (2007) was co-written with Alex Lee at the Melbourne International Comedy Festival. In 2014, she performed live solo shows at The Melbourne and Sydney International Comedy Festivals. Good Lord It’s Christmas (2016) and Parent Virgin (2019) were staged at Sydney's Giant Dwarf Theatre.

In February 2020, Milsom announced that she would not be returning to Triple J after the birth of her second child, and would be leaving at the end of the month. Comedian Michael Hing replaced her on Triple J's drive-time segment, retitled Hobba and Hing, with Lewis Hobba continuing on as co-host.

== Discography ==
=== Singles ===
List of singles, with year released and album name shown
Title	Year	Album
"Sex Flex: A Rap Guide to Fornication" (with Lewis Hobba)	2019	Non-album single

== Awards and nominations ==
=== ARIA Music Awards ===
Year	Nominee / work	Award	Result	Ref.
2019	"Sex Flex: A Rap Guide to Fornication"	Best Comedy Release	Nominated	
