= Hobba and Hing =

Australian comedy duo

Hobba and Hing are an Australian comedy duo formed in 2020 by Lewis Hobba and Michael Hing. Best known for hosting the drive time slot on Australian youth radio station Triple J for three years, they now produce a weekly podcast that began in 2024. The duo have also presented a comedy wellness podcast called Silver Bullet, a television special called Australia's Best Competition Competition, and several live shows.

== Background ==
Lewis Hobba had been hosting Triple J's Drive since 2015 alongside Veronica Milsom. Prior to this, he had presented weekend programs on the station and was involved in the Australian stand-up comedy circuit. Michael Hing was a presenter on the programs Good Game: Pocket Edition on ABC2 and The Feed on SBS Viceland.

== Career ==
Their partnership began in February 2020, when Hing joined Hobba as co-presenter on Triple J's Drive after Milsom's departure. Hobba said the appointment was initially only meant to be a "stop-gap for nine months". At the start, their program was subtitled Lewis and Hing, but it was swiftly renamed to Hobba and Hing after community support.

The duo's best known segment was Simply the Jest, which featured listeners' unbelievable stories. It was presented alongside fellow announcer Jess Perkins every week in a half-hour slot. Due to its success, the segment was turned into a standalone podcast in March 2021.

While at Triple J, the duo performed shows at the Melbourne International Comedy Festival three years in a row. In 2021, they hosted I Can't Believe It's Not Radio!, featuring several of their radio show's most popular segments in a live format. In 2022 and 2023, the duo presented live versions of Simply the Jest, in two shows titled Welcome to the Boardroom (Forum Theatre) and Golden Hamshake (Melbourne Town Hall).

Hobba and Hing hosted their first television special in October 2022 with Australia's Best Competition Competition. A co-production between ABC Television and Triple J, and broadcast on ABC TV Plus, it was an exploration and ranking of community competitions across the nation, including woodchopping and Turkish oil wrestling.

In July 2023, Hobba and Hing announced their departure from the drive time slot. In their last week, they unveiled statues of themselves at Newcastle Museum, which were built in just 48 hours. Hobba commented that Newcastle was chosen for the effigies because: "our national radio show rated weirdly well there, and frankly, we love to reward loyalty with shoddy merchandise."

From August through to September, the duo went on a farewell tour around Australia called The Last Show Ever. Abby Butler and Tyrone Pynor took over Drive presenting duties from August. In their absence, Hobba and Hing announced a new weekly comedy podcast titled Silver Bullet, distributed by the ABC. The show features guests who recommend self-care and wellness activities to the duo, who try out the technique and review it.

In January 2024, Hobba and Hing independently launched a new weekly self-titled podcast.

== Podcasts ==
- Simply the Jest (2021–2023), distributed by the ABC
- Silver Bullet (2023), distributed by the ABC
- Hobba and Hing Podcast (2024–present), distributed independently.
