= Catherine Humphries =

Catherine Humphries is a Squadron Leader in the Royal Australian Air Force (RAAF). She was the first woman and one of the first transgender individuals to take on a combat role in the RAAF. She appeared in a short documentary by The Feed in 2016 and was one of Cosmopolitan Australia's top 50 most influential LGBTQ figures in 2017.

== Career ==
Humphries joined the RAAF in 1997 as a Ground Defense officer and underwent training with the Australian Army at the Royal Military College and the School of Infantry in Singleton.

In 2010, the Australian Defence Force (ADF) policy that dictated employees would be fired for transitioning genders was lifted, and Humphries immediately started the process of her transition. She stated that "After thirty years of hiding, to drop the facade was very scary." As a result of her transition, she was forced to leave her previous assignment due to the AFD prohibiting women from serving combat positions.

In 2013 the ban on women serving in combat roles was lifted for those already serving in non-combat positions, making her the first woman to hold a combat role in the RAAF. Her first deployment was in Afghanistan and she has since been redeployed in the Middle East.
