= Lewis Hobba =

Australian radio & television presenter and comedian

- Born: 16 June 1985 (age 41); Melbourne, Victoria, Australia
- Other names: Hobba, Hobbs
- Occupations: Radio host; comedian; television presenter
- Years active: 2014–present

Lewis Hobba (born 16 June 1985) is an Australian radio presenter, television presenter and comedian. Since 2020, he has worked with Michael Hing as part of the comedy duo Hobba and Hing.

From 2014 to 2020, he co-hosted the afternoon drive time programme on youth radio station Triple J alongside Veronica Milsom until her departure in 2020. He continued to host the time slot with Hing until August 2023 when they both left the station. He continues to host a weekly self-produced podcast with Hing, titled the Hobba and Hing Podcast.

== Early life and education ==
Hobba was born in Melbourne and grew up in Torquay, Victoria. He attended the same high school in Geelong as his Hungry Beast and Triple J Drive co-host, Veronica Milsom. He graduated from RMIT University with a Bachelor of Communication, Media, Film and Television major in 2007 and from Victorian College of the Arts with a Post Graduate Diploma of Film and Television in 2008.

== Career ==
Hobba first appeared on ABC in current affairs comedy programme, Hungry Beast, as a web content producer and presenter. He joined Triple J as co-host of Weekend Breakfast and then Weekend Afternoon alongside Veronica Milsom. In early 2015, Hobba and Milsom moved to the weekday drive time slot (Drive) after Lindsay McDougall left Triple J. He has been a regular contributor on A Rational Fear on FBi Radio and Radio National.

In 2014, he performed his stand-up comedy show, Backs to the Wall, at Sydney Comedy Festival and Melbourne International Comedy Festival.

He has made guest appearances on The Trophy Room, the second iteration of Spicks and Specks, Back Seat Drivers, The Chaser's Media Circus and The Feed.

== Discography ==
=== Singles ===
List of singles, with year released and album name shown
Title	Year	Album
"Sex Flex: A Rap Guide to Fornication" (with Veronica Milsom)	2019	Non-album single

== Filmography ==
=== Television ===
List of television appearances, with year released, role, and notes shown
Year	Title	Role	Notes	Ref.
2011	The Trophy Room	Himself	One episode	
2014	Spicks and Specks	Himself	Season 8; 2 episodes	
2014	Back Seat Drivers	Himself	One episode	
2014–2015	The Chaser's Media Circus	Himself	2 episodes	

=== Podcasts ===
List of podcasts, with year released and role shown
Year	Title	Role	Ref.
2018	Tall Tales & True	Guest; one episode	
2021–2023	Simply the Jest	Co-host	
2018	A Rational Fear	Co-host; 187 Episodes	
2023	Silver Bullet	Co-host	
2024–present	Hobba and Hing Podcast	Co-host	

== Awards and nominations ==
=== ARIA Music Awards ===
Year	Nominee / work	Award	Result	Ref.
2019	"Sex Flex: A Rap Guide to Fornication"	Best Comedy Release	Nominated	
