= Swisse =

Australian vitamin company

- Industry: Health supplement
- Founded: Melbourne, (1969; 57 years ago)
- Headquarters: Cambridge Street, Collingwood, Melbourne, VIC, Australia
- Key people: Kevin Ring (Founder); Radek Sali (ex-CEO)
- Products: Vitamins and supplements
- Parent: Health and Happiness International Holdings Limited
- Website: https://www.swisse.com/en-au/home

Swisse is a vitamin, supplement, and skincare subsidiary of a Hong Kong Chinese company Health and Happiness International Holdings Limited, previously known as Biostime International Holdings Limited in June 2017. Swisse was founded in Australia in 1969 and headquartered in Melbourne, and sold in a $1.7 billion, two-step deal in 2015 & 2016.

== Advertising ==
Swisse is currently an official team partner for the Australian Olympics Team through to 2024.

== Endorsers ==
Swisse's global ambassadors are actor Chris Hemsworth, Nicole Kidman and Elsa Pataky. Other ambassadors include Ricky Ponting and Ashley Hart. Indian stars Nushrat Bharucha and Kriti Kharbanda supported Swisse's launch in the Indian market in early 2020. Dilraba was announced in February 2025 as Global Spokesperson (higher title than Ambassador in China) for Swisse General Food.

== Markets ==
Swisse products are currently available in Australia, New Zealand, Singapore, South Korea, Indonesia, China, Hong Kong, India, the U.S., France, Italy, Switzerland and the Netherlands.

Swisse's parent company is Health and Happiness International Holdings Limited, changed in June 2017, formerly known as Biostime International Holdings Limited and publicly listed on the Hong Kong Stock Exchange.

Measured by sales, it is Australia's top multivitamin brand.

== Legal issues ==
In 2013 Avni Sali, the father of former CEO Radek Sali, sued the Australian Broadcasting Corporation for defamation over a The Checkout segment on Swisse products which claimed that he manipulated clinical tests of a Swisse appetite suppressant to benefit the company. The ABC stood by the segment, and Australia's dietary supplement regulator, the Therapeutic Goods Administration (TGA), nullified the product's legal registration due to "insufficient evidence to support the indications for the product and the presentation of the product was unacceptable" during the course of the suit. The company promptly registered a new product with the same ingredient under the name 'Ultiboost Hunger Control' instead of 'Ultiboost Appetite Suppressant.' The case was eventually settled out of court with no settlement paid and each party paying its own legal fees.

In 2012, the TGA's Complaints Resolution Panel ordered the company to cease use of the terms "clinically proven" and "independently tested" in its promotional materials, in addition to the tagline "Tired? Stressed? You'll feel better on Swisse."

In 2025, Bob Brown Foundation launched a campaign aiming to get Swisse to stop selling environmentally damaging krill oil. Global retailer Holland and Barrett has committed to not selling any krill oil products at any of their 1600 stores across 19 countries by April 2026.

== Products ==
Swisse claim to select the most nutrient-rich ingredients worldwide, and uses formulations based on scientific and traditional evidence. The Swisse products target people of all ages. It has products as liquids, vegetarian-friendly capsules, dissolvable powders and effervescents with fruit flavourings. Swisse claims to avoid added sugars, and work to ensure products are as 'clean' as possible in formulating for bioavailability and minimising excipients.

Swisse has a product range combining probiotics, nutrients, and herbs, as well as a range using Australian hemp seed oil, which the company believes "will play an important role in the delivery of incremental growth for Swisse ANZ in 2020." Swisse Beauty's 'Healthy Beautiful' range launched in early 2020.
