= Reverse Runner =

- Official Poster
- Directed by: Lachlan Ryan; Jarrod Theodore
- Screenplay by: Lachlan Ryan; Jarrod Theodore
- Story by: Dan Cannon; Jarrod Theodore; Lachlan Ryan
- Produced by: Jarrod Theodore; Lachlan Ryan
- Starring: Dan Cannon; Dave Callan; Steve Moneghetti; Rosco Brauer; Bianca Linton; Julian Shaw; Bruce McAvaney; Rhys Mitchell; Justin Kennedy
- Cinematography: Lachlan Ryan; Jarrod Theodore
- Edited by: Lachlan Ryan; Jarrod Theodore
- Music by: Thomas E Rouch
- Production company: Theory Pictures
- Distributed by: Theory Pictures; Pinnacle Films
- Release date: 11 October 2012
- Running time: 86 minutes
- Country: Australia
- Language: English

Reverse Runner (sometimes stylised as Яeverse Яunner) is an Australian comedy film written and directed by Lachlan Ryan and Jarrod Theodore, executive produced by Stephen Herek. It stars Dan Cannon, Dave Callan, Steve Moneghetti, Rosco Brauer and Olympic commentator Bruce McAvaney. It tells the story of teenager Kid Campbell, who dreams of becoming a reverse runner despite being mocked, ridiculed and kicked out of home for refusing to get an ordinary job. In the end, he is left to question his childhood dream.

It had a limited theatrical release on 11 October 2012, playing in cinemas until April 2013. It was released on DVD, Blu-ray, and VOD in Australia on 18 September 2013, and 30 October 2013 in New Zealand.

== Cast ==
- Dan Cannon as Kid Campbell
- Dave Callan as a Commentator
- Steve Moneghetti as John Jones
- Rosco Brauer as Coach Leroy
- Bianca Linton as Hannah
- Julian Shaw as Steven James
- Bruce McAvaney as a Commentator
- Rhys Mitchell as a Commentator
- Justin Kennedy as Suicidal Starter
- Stephen Lopez as Head Helper
- Helen Bongers as Mum
- Daryl Cannon as Gary
- Casey Asplin as Young Kid Campbell

== Production ==
Principal photography on Reverse Runner involved approximately 300 people throughout the duration of the shoot. The majority of the film was shot in the country town of Colac in Victoria. Other locations include the John Landy Athletics Field, Geelong; Melbourne Park; and the world-renowned landscapes at Lavers Hill along the Great Ocean Road.

== Music ==
Thomas E. Rouch composed the orchestral score for the film. Rouch collaborated with singers James Cupples, Nicholas Roy, and Sid O'Neil, re-recording some of Australia's classic rock songs, including "Run to Paradise" by The Choirboys and "Most People I Know (Think That I'm Crazy)" by Billy Thorpe. Rouch and Cupples also re-recorded Walk Right In by Dr Hook.

Sid O'Neil, lead singer from the Vasco Era, recorded vocals for an original track titled "Backwards As They Come", which appears in the film. Tinpan Orange duo Emily and Jesse recorded vocals for an original music track titled "Fallen Dreams", produced by Thomas E. Rouch.

== Marketing ==
Australian musical icon Mike Brady, who wrote football anthems "Up There Cazaly" and "One Day in September", recorded a voice-over for Reverse Runner’s trailer.

== Release ==
On 11 October 2012, Reverse Runner was released theatrically at Colac Cinemas, where it became the cinema's highest-grossing film of the year as well as the third-highest overall. Reverse Runner also screened at Village Cinemas Geelong, Ballarat's Regent Cinema, Warrnambool, Hamilton, Horsham, Ararat, and Echuca Cinemas in 2013.

== Reception ==
Simon Foster of SBS awarded the film three and a half stars out of five: "Given that the past 12 months of Australian big-screen comedy has been arguably its direst ever, the amiably silly low-budgeter Reverse Runner comes as somewhat of a revelation. The debut work of writer/directors Jarrod Theodore and Lachlan Ryan and their production outfit Theory Pictures suggests that there may be a silver lining on the dark cloud that is Screen Australia’s policy on indie feature comedy funding."
