= Where Are You Really From? =

Australian TV documentary

Where Are You Really From? is an Australian television documentary ancestry series, which first screened in 2018 on SBS. Comedian Michael Hing visits migrants and their descendants to learn about their heritage and communities around Australia.

== Episodes ==
=== Season One (2018) ===
No. In series	No. In season	Migrant group	Location
1	1	Chinese	Bendigo
2	2	Sikhs	Woolgoolga
3	3	South Sudanese	Toowoomba

=== Season Two (2019) ===
No. In series	No. In season	Migrant group	Location
4	1	Italians	Ingham
5	2	Peranakans	Katanning
6	3	Germans	Barossa Valley
7	4	Assyrians	Fairfield

=== Season Three (2020) ===
No. In series	No. In season	Migrant group	Location
8	1	Vietnamese	Brisbane
9	2	Greeks	Darwin
10	3	Serbians	Wollongong
11	4	Albanians	Shepparton

== See also ==
- Who Do You Think You Are? (Australian TV series) – a TV series exploring the ancestry of individual Australians
