= Piece of Wood Award =

Show Award

Founded in 1998 by comedian Greg Fleet, the Piece of Wood Award is awarded during the Melbourne International Comedy Festival to the best show as voted by a committee of comedians which includes all past winners of the award. Literally a piece of wood, it is traditional for winners to bite the award.

Past winners have included:

- 1998 - Linda Haggar and Fahey Younger - Lost due to war
- 1999 - Simon Munnery
- 2000 - Stewart Lee
- 2001 - Rich Fulcher
- 2002 - Charlie Pickering - Boiling Point and Michael Chamberlin
- 2003 - Justin Hamilton
- 2004 - Andrew McClelland- Andrew McClelland's Somewhat Accurate History of Pirates (1550-2017)
- 2005 - Tony Law
- 2006 - Fiona O'Loughlin and Damian Callinan - Spaznuts (Shared)
- 2007 - Andy Zaltzman
- 2008 - Tom Gleeson
- 2009 - Lawrence Mooney - Make The Girls Laugh
- 2010 - Sam Simmons - Fail
- 2011 - Harley Breen - I Heart Bunnings: Stories About My Brothers
- 2012 - Bob Franklin and Steven Gates - Stubborn Monkey Disorder
- 2013 - David Quirk - Shaking Hands With Danger
- 2014 - Sarah Kendall - Touchdown
- 2015 - Anne Edmonds - You Know What I'm Like
- 2016 - Chris Wainhouse
- 2017 - Luke Heggie - Rough Diamanté
- 2018 - Heath Franklin - Chopper
- 2019 - Geraldine Hickey - Things are going well
- 2021 - Greg Larsen - This might not be hell
- 2022 - Tina Del Twist - Caravan in the Sky
- 2023 - Dan Rath - All Quiet Carriage Along the Inner Western Line
- 2024 - Claire Hooper – So Proud
- 2025 - Daniel Connell – Box-Headed Manbaby
- 2026 - Nikki Britton
