= AACTA Award for Best Direction in Television =

Australian television award

The Australian Film Institute Award for Best Direction in Television is awarded annually by the Australian Film Institute as part of the awards in television for excellence in direction. Prior to 1990, two awards existed and were called Best Direction in a Mini Series and Best Direction in a Telefeature. The awards were merged in 1990 and became Best Direction in a Telefeature or Mini Series which in 1991 was renamed Best Achievement in Direction in a Television Drama. In 2004, this award became Best Direction in Television.

== Best Direction in a Mini Series ==
Year	Winner	Recipient(s)	Network	Other nominees
1986	The Dunera Boys	Ben Lewin	ABC TV	
1987	The Great Bookie Robbery	Marcus Cole, Mark Joffe		
1988	The True Believers	Peter Fisk		
1989	Edens Lost	Neil Armfield		

== Best Direction in a Telefeature ==
Year	Winner	Recipient(s)	Network	Other nominees
1986	Displaced Persons	Geoffrey Nottage		
1987	Two Friends	Jane Campion		
1988	A Matter of Convenience	Ben Lewin		
1989	Rescue	Peter Fisk		

== Best Direction in a Telefeature or Mini Series ==
Year	Winner	Recipient(s)	Network	Other nominees
1990	Come In Spinner	Robert Marchand	ABC TV	

== Best Achievement in Direction in a Television Drama ==
Year	Winner	Episode	Recipient(s)	Network	Other nominees
1991	Embassy	"A human dimension"	Mark Callan	ABC TV	
1992	Brides of Christ		Ken Cameron	ABC TV	
1993	Police Rescue	"Whirlwind"	Michael Carson	ABC TV	
1994	Heartland	Episode #7	Julian Pringle	ABC TV	
1995	Frontline	"The siege"	Rob Sitch, Santo Cilauro, Jane Kennedy, Tom Gleisner	ABC TV	
1996	Blue Murder		Michael Jenkins	ABC TV	
1997	Good Guys Bad Guys	"1.8 million reasons to change your name (Part 2)"	Brendan Maher	Nine Network	
1998	Wildside	Episode #17	Peter Andrikidis	ABC TV	
1999	The Day of the Roses		Peter Fisk		
2000	Grass Roots	"The whole year"	Peter Andrikidis	ABC TV	
2001	My Husband, My Killer		Peter Andrikidis		
2002	The Road from Coorain		Brendan Maher		
2003	After the Deluge		Brendan Maher		

== Best Direction in Television ==
Year	Winner	Episode	Recipient(s)	Network	Other nominees
2004	Marking Time		Cherie Nowlan		
2005	Love My Way		Jessica Hobbs		
2006	Answered by Fire		Jessica Hobbs		
2007	The King		Matthew Saville		
2008	Underbelly		Peter Andrikidis	Nine Network	Satisfaction: ?? - Daina Reid - (Showcase)
2009	East West 101	"Atonement"	Peter Andrikidis	SBS TV	
2010	Hawke		Emma Freeman	Network Ten	Dance Academy: "Week Zero" - Jeffrey Walker (ABCTV); Rush: "Train" - Grant Brown (Network Ten); Tangle: "Lost and Found" - Emma Freeman - (Showcase)
2011	The Slap	Episode 3: Harry	Matthew Saville	ABC1	Paper Giants: The Birth of Cleo: "Episode 1" - Daina Reid (ABC1); The Slap: "Episode 1" - Jessica Hobbs (ABC1); Small Time Gangster: "Jingle Bells" - Jeffrey Walker - Movie Extra
2012	Jack Irish: Bad Debts		Jeffrey Walker	ABC1	The Amazing Race Australia: "Episode 1" - Michael McKay (Seven Network); Beaconsfield - Glendyn Ivin (Nine Network); Howzat! Kerry Packer's War: "Part 1" - Daina Reid - Nine Network

== See also ==
- Australian Film Institute
- AFI Awards
- Australian Film Institute Television Awards
