= Australian Film Institute Award for Best Television Documentary =

Former Australian documentary award

The Australian Film Institute Award for Best Television Documentary is an award that was handed out to producers annually between 1990 and 1997 by the Australian Film Institute. In 1998, this Award was replaced equivalent Awards in the non-feature film category including Australian Film Institute Award for Best Feature Length Documentary, Australian Film Institute Award for Best Documentary Under One Hour and Australian Film Institute Award for Best Direction in a Documentary.

Year	Winner	Recipient(s)	Network	Other nominees
1990	In search of Dr Mabuse	Varcha Sidwell	ABC TV	
1991	Guns and Roses	John Moore; Helen Bowman		
1992	Cop it sweet	Jenny Brockie	ABC TV	
1993	Who killed Malcolm Smith?	Nicholas Adler; Caroline Sherwood		
1994	So help me God	Jenny Brockie	ABC TV	
1995	Untold Desires	Eva Orner; Sarah Stevens	SBS TV	
1996	The Hillman	Tony Wright	SBS TV	
1997	Dhuway	Lew Griffiths; Noel Pearson		No other nominees

== See also ==
- Australian Film Institute
- AFI Awards
- Australian Film Institute Television Awards
