= Win the Week =

Australian game quiz show

- Genre: Game show
- Created by: Scott Abbot; Craig Reucassel
- Presented by: Alex Lee
- Starring: Craig Reucassel
- Country of origin: Australia
- Original language: English
- No. of series: 2
- No. of episodes: 14

Production
- Executive producers: Scott Abbot; Craig Reucassel; Rachel Millar
- Producer: Martin Robertson
- Camera setup: Multi-camera
- Running time: 30 minutes
- Production companies: Wrapsheet; ABC

Original release
- Network: ABC
- Release: 23 June 2021 – present

Win the Week is an Australian television comedy quiz show, which premiered on the ABC on 23 June 2021. The series is presented by Alex Lee, who quizzes three teams of paired celebrities and everyday Australian captains on the week's top news stories. At the end of each round, the team captains had the opportunity to "Stay" with their celebrity teammate or "Betray" them by swapping them with a celebrity from another team. In the first series, the winner of each show won a framed themed calendar with the week they had won coloured in gold. From the second series, the winner of each show won a golden "Betray" buzzer trophy.

It was revealed in February 2022 that Win The Week would be returning for a second series, which premiered on 3 August 2022.

in February 2023, the ABC announced that Win The Week would not be returning in 2023.

== Format ==
=== Segments ===
- Mixed Messages: Alex reads out a fake news headline created from combing two headlines from the past week. Team members buzz in to guess one of the stories, while their teammate is left to guess the other half. Each story guessed is worth five points.
- Double or Nothing: Questions are asked in pairs by Alex. Team captains must buzz in to answer the first question correctly but only win 10 points if their celebrity team member answers a related follow-up question correctly as well.
- Up to the Minute: News events from the past week within one minute.
- Picture This: Team members are each given a picture which they must describe to their partner and put together to work out the corresponding news story before their time runs out. Each correct guess is worth 15 points.
- This Week in History: News events from the past week in previous years. Each correct guess is worth 15 points.
- Bleeping News: Teams are presented with a news segment with two parts bleeped out. Team captains must guess the first bleep while celebrities guess the second bleep. Each correct guess is worth 15 points.
- Pants: Alex reads a headline where one word has been replaced with the word "pants". Teams must buzz in to guess each replaced word for 10 points but lose 10 points if they answer incorrectly.

== Series overview ==
Series	Episodes	Originally released	
Series	Episodes	First released	Last released
1	6	23 June 2021	11 August 2021
2	8	3 August 2022	21 September 2022

== Episodes ==
=== Series 1 (2021) ===
Note: Winners are listed in bold

No. overall	No. in season	Title	Original release date	Australian viewers
1	1	Episode 1	23 June 2021	517,000 (Note: Consolidated ratings figure)
Original teams: **Jacky** partnered with Andrew Denton; Jade partnered with **Nina Oyama**; Alex partnered with Craig Reucassel
2	2	Episode 2	30 June 2021	419,000
Original teams: **Catherine** partnered with Annabel Crabb; Peter partnered with **Mark Humphries**; Alice partnered with Craig Reucassel
3	3	Episode 3	7 July 2021	357,000
Original teams: Maddie partnered with **Ellen Fanning**; **Narelle** partnered with Ben Jenkins; Romaan partnered with Craig Reucassel
4	4	Episode 4	14 July 2021	366,000
Original teams: **Luke** partnered with Jennifer Byrne; Brigid partnered with Michael Hing; Peta partnered with **Craig Reucassel**
5	5	Episode 5	4 August 2021	280,000 (Note: Overnight ratings figure)
Original teams: Noah partnered with **Hamish Blake**; **Lesley** partnered with Sarah Harris; Kalyana partnered with Craig Reucassel
6	6	Episode 6	11 August 2021	367,000
Original teams: Helen partnered with **Costa Georgiadis**; **Tim** partnered with Zoe Norton Lodge; Gary partnered with Craig Reucassel

=== Series 2 (2022) ===
The second series of the show premiered on 3 August 2022.

Note: Winners are listed in bold

No. overall	No. in season	Title	Original release date	Australian viewers
7	1	Episode 1	3 August 2022	324,000
Original teams: **Giselle** partnered with Mark Humphries; Matt partnered with Kumi Taguchi; Kim partnered with **Craig Reucassel**
8	2	Episode 2	10 August 2022	266,000
Original teams: Daniel partnered with Ellen Fanning; **Jioji** partnered with **Cal Wilson**; Sera partnered with Craig Reucassel
9	3	Episode 3	17 August 2022	147,000
Original teams: Danielle partnered with Michael Hing; Miles partnered with Craig Reucassel; **Nikki** partnered with **Susie Youssef**
10	4	Episode 4	24 August 2022	130,000
Original teams: **Maddie** partnered with **Nazeem Hussain**; Jason partnered with Craig Reucassel; Liana partnered with Zoe Norton Lodge
11	5	Episode 5	31 August 2022	163,000
Original teams: Ru partnered with Craig Reucassel; **Owen** partnered with Grace Tame; Natasha partnered with **Lewis Hobba**
12	6	Episode 6	7 September 2022	171,000
Original teams: **Imogen** partnered with **Geraldine Hickey**; Jono partnered with Grant Denyer; Nicole partnered with Craig Reucassel
13	7	Episode 7	14 September 2022	180,000
Original teams: Indi partnered with Steph Tisdell; Kru partnered with **Tony Armstrong**; **Wil** partnered with Craig Reucassel
14	8	Episode 8	21 September 2022	196,000
Original teams: **Izzy** partnered with **Luke McGregor**; Frank partnered with Wendy Harmer; Tanya partnered with Craig Reucassel
