= The Roast =

Television series

- Official logo
- Genre: Comedy; news satire
- Written by: Tom Glasson; Nich Richardson; Mark Humphries; Kara Jensen-Mackinnon; Sean Maguire; Clarke Richards; Evan Williams; Alex Lee; Jazz Twemlow; Seaton Kay-Smith; Melina Wicks; David Ferrier
- Directed by: Nich Richardson
- Starring: Tom Glasson; Nich Richardson; Mark Humphries; Clarke Richards; Alex Lee; Jazz Twemlow
- Country of origin: Australia

Production
- Executive producers: Charles Firth; Andy Neil; Nich Richardson; Sophia Zachariou
- Production company: Hollow Bear Productions

The Roast was a flagship Australian satirical news show that screened on the Australian Broadcasting Corporation (ABC) television channel ABC2. The daily ten-minute show was hosted by Tom Glasson and featured Mark Humphries, Clarke Richards, Alex Lee, Jazz Twemlow and Nich Richardson.

The Roast began life online as a one-minute, news headlines show in 2011. It expanded to a two-minute series in 2012 which also screened on ABC2. From 8 April 2013, it began screening on ABC2 in a regular timeslot at 7.30pm weeknights as a 10-minute program. It was then renewed for another season in 2014, again as a 10-minute daily show, with the addition of ABC News 24 presenter Alex Lee, replacing Rachel Corbett.

On 4 November 2014, David Knox of TV Tonight reported that The Roast had been axed and would not return in 2015.

On 29 December 2014, the Australian online wing of the British national daily newspaper, The Guardian presented an exclusive end of year wrap-up episode of The Roast hosted by Mark Humphries. The collaboration with the publication was extended with the announcement on 18 March 2015 of a limited run return of the series.

== The PodRoast ==
On 14 April 2013 the producers and writers of the show began a podcast show called The PodRoast. The podcast provided additional commentary and behind the scenes details about the show. The show also has a regular segment called "Who is your least favourite person this week?" where the cast and crew said which member of the show is their least favourite person, usually this is because of their working style or because of an issue they caused during production.

== See also ==
- List of satirical television news programs
