= Australian Film Institute Television Awards =

Television award in Australia

The Australian Film Institute Television Awards are annual awards presented for excellence in Australian television annually as part of the AFI Awards by the Australian Film Institute. The AFI Awards cover non-feature films, films, television, and special awards. The AFI Television Awards are made in various categories and this page serves as an index of the various TV awards. From 1969 the AFI also awarded the AFI film awards: in 2010 the new organisation Australian_Academy_of_Cinema_and_Television_Arts has awarded AACTA_Awards

== Best Telefeature, Mini Series or Short Run Series ==
The Australian Film Institute Award for Best Telefeature, Mini Series or Short Run Series is an award that has been handed out to producers annually since 1986 by the Australian Film Institute. The Award was originally presented in two separate categories for Best Telefeature and Best Mini Series but in 1990 both categories were merged to form Best Television Mini Series or Telefeature. By 2008 the award name was changed again with the addition of Short Run Series to the title.

- List of award winners and nominees in the AFI Award for Best Mini Series 1986-1989
- List of award winners and nominees in the AFI Award for Best Telefeature 1986-1989
- List of award winners and nominees in the AFI Award for Best Mini Series or Telefeature 1990-2007
- List of award winners and nominees in the AFI Award for Best Telefeature, Mini Series or Short Run Series 2008-present

== Best Television Documentary ==
The Australian Film Institute Award for Best Television Documentary is an award that was handed out to producers annually between 1990 and 1997 by the Australian Film Institute. In 1998, this Award was replaced equivalent Awards in the non-feature film category.

- List of award winners and nominees in the AFI Award for Best Television Documentary 1990-1997
- List of award winners and nominees in the AFI Award for Best Feature Length Documentary 1998-present
- List of award winners and nominees in the AFI Award for Best Documentary Under One Hour 1998-present
- List of award winners and nominees in the AFI Award for Best Direction in a Documentary 1998-present

== Best Television Drama series ==
The Australian Film Institute Award for Best Drama Series is awarded annually by the Australian Film Institute for excellence in drama series. The award which was originally named Best Episode in a Television Drama, Series or Serial was originally awarded only for the best episode in a television series. The award eventually was split into two categories for best episode in a Drama Serial and Drama Series. The Best Episode in a Drama Serial category eventually was renamed to Best Episode in a Television Drama Series (Long) to award long series such as soap operas but was discontinued in 2001. The Best Episode in a Television Drama Series category was eventually renamed in 2002 as Best Drama Series awarding the series as a whole.

- List of award winners and nominees in the AFI Award for Best Episode in a Television Drama, Series or Serial 1991-1992
- List of award winners and nominees in the AFI Award for Best Episode in a Television Drama Serial 1993-1998
- List of award winners and nominees in the AFI Award for Best Episode in a Television Drama Series (Long) 1999-2001
- List of award winners and nominees in the AFI Award for Best Episode in a Television Drama Series 1993-2001
- List of award winners and nominees in the AFI Award for Best Television Drama Series 2002-present

== Best Children's Television Drama ==
The Australian Film Institute Award for Best Children's Television Drama is awarded annually by the Australian Film Institute for excellence in children's television drama. The award commenced in 1991 and in 2009 an additional category for Best Children's Television Animation was awarded.

- List of award winners and nominees in the AFI Award for Best Children's Television Drama 1991-present
- List of award winners and nominees in the AFI Award for Best Children's Television Animation 2009-present

== Best Television Comedy Series ==
The Australian Film Institute Award for Best Television Comedy Series is awarded annually by the Australian Film Institute for excellence in television comedy. The award commenced in 2003 and was initially called Best Comedy Series - Sitcom or Sketch and was renamed Best Television Comedy Series in 2005.

- List of award winners and nominees in the AFI Award for Best Comedy Series - Sitcom or Sketch 2003-2004
- List of award winners and nominees in the AFI Award for Best Television Comedy Series 2005-present

== Best Light Entertainment Television Series ==
The Australian Film Institute Award for Best Light Entertainment Television Series is awarded annually by the Australian Film Institute for excellence in television light entertainment. The award commenced in 2003.

- List of award winners and nominees in the AFI Award for Best Light Entertainment Television Series 2003-present. Like to also thank Jordan Koorey at youtube.com/theleboaussie

== Best Lead Actor in Television Drama ==
The Australian Film Institute Award for Best Lead Actor in Television Drama is awarded annually by the Australian Film Institute for excellence in acting in television drama by an actor. Prior to 1990, two awards existed and were called Best Performance by an Actor in a Mini Series and Best Lead Actor in a Telefeature. The awards were merged in 1990 to become Best Actor in a Leading Role in a Telefeature or Mini Series which in 1991 was renamed Best Actor in a Leading Role in a Television Drama. In 2000, the Awards were again awarded in two categories, called Best Performance by an Actor in a Telefeature or Mini Series and Best Actor in a Leading Role in a Television Drama. In 2002, the Awards were again combined under the title Best Actor in a Leading Role in a Television Drama and two years later, in 2004, the Award was named Best Actor in a Leading Role in a Television Drama or Comedy. A separate comedy Award was established in 2006, and this Award became Best Lead Actor in Television Drama.

- List of award winners and nominees in the AFI Award for Best Performance by an Actor in a Mini Series 1986-1989
- List of award winners and nominees in the AFI Award for Best Lead Actor in a Telefeature 1986-1989
- List of award winners and nominees in the AFI Award for Best Actor in a Leading Role in a Telefeature or Mini Series 1990
- List of award winners and nominees in the AFI Award for Best Actor in a Leading Role in a Television Drama 1991-2002
- List of award winners and nominees in the AFI Award for Best Performance by an Actor in a Telefeature or Mini Series 2000-2001
- List of award winners and nominees in the AFI Award for Best Actor in a Leading Role in a Television Drama 2002-2003
- List of award winners and nominees in the AFI Award for Best Actor in a Leading Role in a Television Drama or Comedy 2004-2005
- List of award winners and nominees in the AFI Award for Best Lead Actor in Television Drama 2006-present

== Best Lead Actress in Television Drama ==
The Australian Film Institute Award for Best Lead Actress in Television Drama is awarded annually by the Australian Film Institute for excellence in acting in television drama by an actress. Prior to 1990, two awards existed and were called Best Performance by an Actress in a Mini Series and Best Lead Actress in a Telefeature. The awards were merged in 1990 to become Best Actress in a Leading Role in a Telefeature or Mini Series which in 1991 was renamed Best Actress in a Leading Role in a Television Drama. In 2000, the Awards were again awarded in two categories, called Best Performance by an Actress in a Telefeature or Mini Series and Best Actress in a Leading Role in a Television Drama. In 2002, the Awards were again combined under the title Best Actress in a Leading Role in a Television Drama and two years later, in 2004, the Award was named Best Actress in a Leading Role in a Television Drama or Comedy. A separate comedy Award was established in 2006, and this Award became Best Lead Actress in Television Drama.

- List of award winners and nominees in the AFI Award for Best Performance by an Actress in a Mini Series 1986-1989
- List of award winners and nominees in the AFI Award for Best Lead Actress in a Telefeature 1986-1989
- List of award winners and nominees in the AFI Award for Best Actress in a Leading Role in a Telefeature or Mini Series 1990
- List of award winners and nominees in the AFI Award for Best Actress in a Leading Role in a Television Drama 1991-2002
- List of award winners and nominees in the AFI Award for Best Performance by an Actress in a Telefeature or Mini Series 2000-2001
- List of award winners and nominees in the AFI Award for Best Actress in a Leading Role in a Television Drama 2002-2003
- List of award winners and nominees in the AFI Award for Best Actress in a Leading Role in a Television Drama or Comedy 2004-2005
- List of award winners and nominees in the AFI Award for Best Lead Actress in Television Drama 2006-present

== Best Guest or Supporting Actor in Television Drama ==
The Australian Film Institute Award for Best Guest or Supporting Actor in Television Drama is awarded annually by the Australian Film Institute for excellence in acting in television drama by a guest or supporting actor. Prior to 2002, the Award was called Best Performance by an Actor in a Guest Role in a Television Drama Series. In 2002, the Award name was changed to Best Guest or Supporting Actor in Television Drama and two years later, in 2004, the Award was named Best Actor in a Supporting or Guest Role in a Television Drama or Comedy. A separate comedy Award was established in 2006, and this Award became Best Guest or Supporting Actor in Television Drama.

- List of award winners and nominees in the AFI Award for Best Performance by an Actor in a Guest Role in a Television Drama Series 2000-2001
- List of award winners and nominees in the AFI Award for Best Guest or Supporting Actor in Television Drama 2002-2003
- List of award winners and nominees in the AFI Award for Best Actor in a Supporting or Guest Role in a Television Drama or Comedy 2004-2005
- List of award winners and nominees in the AFI Award for Best Guest or Supporting Actor in Television Drama 2006-present

== Best Guest or Supporting Actress in Television Drama ==
The Australian Film Institute Award for Best Guest or Supporting Actress in Television Drama is awarded annually by the Australian Film Institute for excellence in acting in television drama by a guest or supporting actress. Prior to 2002, the Award was called Best Performance by an Actress in a Guest Role in a Television Drama Series. In 2002, the Award name was changed to Best Guest or Supporting Actress in Television Drama and two years later, in 2004, the Award was named Best Actress in a Supporting or Guest Role in a Television Drama or Comedy. A separate comedy Award was established in 2006, and this Award became Best Guest or Supporting Actress in Television Drama.

- List of award winners and nominees in the AFI Award for Best Performance by an Actress in a Guest Role in a Television Drama Series 2000-2001
- List of award winners and nominees in the AFI Award for Best Guest or Supporting Actress in Television Drama 2002-2003
- List of award winners and nominees in the AFI Award for Best Actress in a Supporting or Guest Role in a Television Drama or Comedy 2004-2005
- List of award winners and nominees in the AFI Award for Best Guest or Supporting Actress in Television Drama 2006-present

== Best Direction in Television ==
The Australian Film Institute Award for Best Direction in Television is awarded annually by the Australian Film Institute for excellence in direction of television drama. Prior to 1990, two awards existed and were called Best Direction in a Mini Series and Best Direction in a Telefeature. The awards were merged in 1990 to become Best Direction in a Telefeature or Mini Series which in 1991 was renamed Best Achievement in Direction in a Television Drama. In 2004, this award became Best Direction in Television.

- List of award winners and nominees in the AFI Award for Best Direction in a Mini Series 1986-1989
- List of award winners and nominees in the AFI Award for Best Direction in a Telefeature 1986-1989
- List of award winners and nominees in the AFI Award for Best Direction in a Telefeature or Mini Series 1990
- List of award winners and nominees in the AFI Award for Best Achievement in Direction in a Television Drama 1991-2003
- List of award winners and nominees in the AFI Award for Best Direction in Television 2004-present

== Best Screenplay in Television ==
The Australian Film Institute Award for Best Screenplay in Television is awarded annually by the Australian Film Institute for excellence in screenplay of television drama. Prior to 1990, two awards existed and were called Best Mini Series Screenplay and Best Screenplay in a Telefeature. The awards were merged in 1990 to become Best Screenplay in a Mini Series or Telefeature which in 1991 was renamed Best Screenplay in a Television Drama. In 2004, this award became Best Screenplay in Television.

- List of award winners and nominees in the AFI Award for Best Mini Series Screenplay 1986-1989
- List of award winners and nominees in the AFI Award for Best Screenplay in a Telefeature 1986-1989
- List of award winners and nominees in the AFI Award for Best Screenplay in a Mini Series or Telefeature 1990
- List of award winners and nominees in the AFI Award for Best Screenplay in a Television Drama 1991-2003
- List of award winners and nominees in the AFI Award for Best Screenplay in Television 2004-present

== See also ==
- List of television awards
- Australian Film Institute
- AFI Awards
