= Dan Ilic =

Australian comedian (born 1981)

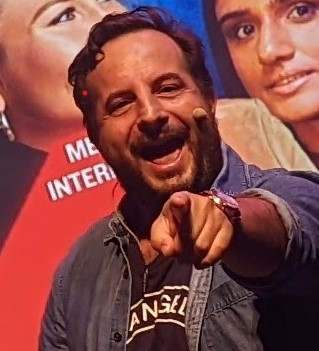
- Ilic in 2022
- Born: 20 November 1981 (age 44); Sydney, New South Wales, Australia
- Occupations: Comedian, actor, filmmaker, broadcaster
- Known for: The Ronnie Johns Half Hour, Beaconsfield: The Musical, Hungry Beast, So where the bloody hell are you?, Can of Worms
- Website: http://www.danilic.com/

Dan Ilic (born 20 November 1981) is an Australian presenter, comedian and filmmaker. Ilic has been known for his parody work, including videos and Beaconsfield: The Musical, which he wrote, and more recently for his work on the show Hungry Beast. Dan's mother is half Lebanese and half Italian. Dan's father was born in Germany to Serbian parents. He was previously the head of satirical content for digital content provider AJ+ until he was fired for misusing company materials for a failed audition to The Daily Show.

== Performing ==
Ilic started his performing career with the Cumberland Gang Show and eventually joined the production team as a junior producer at the age of 13. He spent 11 years performing and producing Cumberland Gang Show, and became a regular fixture in Sydney's amateur musical theatre scene.

At Macquarie University he performed in several shows including Chris McDonald's The Beatification of Newt Berton, the Great Viagra Robbery (in which performed with Heath Franklin and James Pender). The show toured to the Melbourne International Comedy Festival and a short run in Canberra in 2003.

Ilic was also part of the university sketch comedy The 3rd Degree which formed the base of the Network Ten's cult sketch comedy television show The Ronnie Johns Half Hour with Ilic not only a cast member and writer, but also animator and producer of several sketches.

In 2007 he started the Sydney sketch comedy club night Comicide and in 2008 toured a "best of" show, Comicide: Death by Funny, to the Melbourne International Comedy Festival.

Ilic was a reporter/presenter on the Andrew Denton produced show Hungry Beast, aired on ABC1, and as a writer/performer on Can of Worms on Network Ten. After Hungry Beast finished its second season in 2010, Ilic was one of nine members of the team to be selected by Denton to develop online content for Zapruder's Other Films.

Other television appearances include Romper Room (Seven Network), 9am with David & Kim (Network Ten), 4 Corners (ABC-TV), and ADbc (Special Broadcasting Service). He now hosts a podcast that many have described as a Bert Newtown take on Louis Theroux.

== Beaconsfield: The Musical ==
Ilic's production Beaconsfield: The Musical, which premiered in Melbourne in late 2008, focused on the media circus that surrounded the events of the 2006 Beaconsfield mine collapse. The show received strong reviews, but its original title, Beaconsfield: A Musical in A-Flat Minor, was strongly criticised, leading to the change in name.

== Directing ==
In 2008, Dan moved to Melbourne to direct The Comedy Channel's satirical news program, The Mansion starring Michael Chamberlin and Charlie Pickering. He has also filmed and produced a selection of short video parodies, along with other related online work. These have included filming and editing for the Axis of Awesome's Election '07 Rap Battle; an anti-web censorship advertisement, Censordyne, produced for GetUp; a parody website describing a fake television series about the murder of Michael McGurk; and a parody video of the Freeview advertising campaign produced for Massage My Medium, a comedy stand-up routine featuring Ilic and Marc Fennell, which in turn was removed from YouTube when it was accused of being a copyright violation, as the work employed footage from the advertisement being parodied.

At times his work has been the subject of criticism – his parody of the Where the bloody hell are you? advertising campaign, designed to attract tourists to Australia, received threats of legal action from Tourism Australia. Ilic was also behind Vicroads' controversial "Don't be a dickhead" campaign, which makes fun of "gingers" and "emos" in an attempt to create awareness of using mobile phones while driving.

In December 2014 it was announced that Ilic would take up a position in San Francisco as "senior producer of satire" with AJ+, part of Al Jazeera Media Network. But in 2015 he was sacked after using company equipment to film an audition for The Daily Show.
