= Untold Desires =

1994 documentary film

- Directed by: Sarah Stephens
- Written by: Sarah Stephens
- Produced by: Eva Orner
- Cinematography: Peter Falk
- Edited by: Zbigniew Friedrich
- Music by: John Phillips; David Bridie
- Release date: 1994
- Running time: 53 minutes
- Country: Australia
- Language: English

Untold Desires is a 1994 documentary film written and directed by Sarah Stephens and produced by Eva Orner. It looks at the sexuality of disabled people. It won the SBS network's first Logie award and won a 1995 Human Rights Medal.

== Production ==
The movie primarily features people with physical disabilities talking about their needs, desires and issues they face. This is mixed in with erotic fantasy sequences. It is the first production from Fertile Films A company founded by Stephens and Orner

== Reception ==
The Age's Phillipa Hawker writes "Untold Desires is terrific, challenging television." Writing in the Sydney Morning Herald, Alison Stewart concludes, "Melbourne film-makers Sarah Stephens and Eva Orner have managed to make a remarkable film that neutralises the negative image of disabled people as perverse or non-sexual. Highly recommended."

== Awards ==
- 1995 Australian Film Institute Awards
  - Best Television Documentary - Eva Orner, Sarah Stevens (SBS) - won
- Logie Awards of 1996
  - Most Outstanding Factual or Documentary Program - SBS - won
