= Michael Hing =

Australian radio announcer and comedian

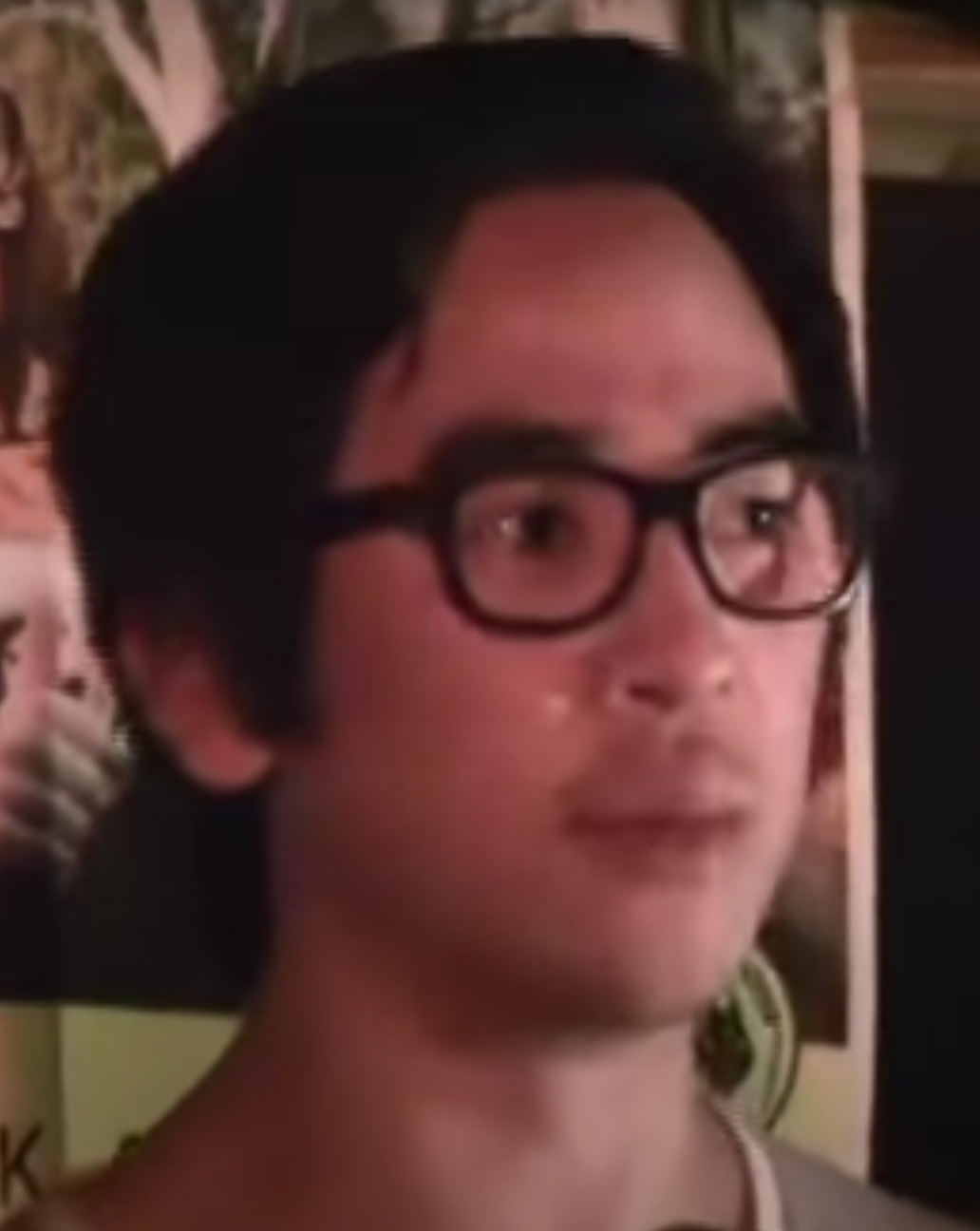
- Hing performing in 2013
- Born: May 16, 1985 (age 41); Sydney, Australia
- Occupations: Radio presenter; television presenter; podcaster; comedian; actor
- Years active: 2009–present
- Known for: Free to a Good Home, Hobba and Hing, The Project, Celebrity Letters and Numbers, Where Are You Really From?
- Spouse: Humyara Mahbub (m. 2023)

Michael Hing (born 16 May 1985) is an Australian comedian, television and radio presenter, podcaster and actor. He was a presenter on Network Ten’s The Project, and was formerly a co-host of the drive time show on youth radio station Triple J alongside Lewis Hobba, of which they form the Hobba and Hing comedy duo. They now present a self-produced podcast.

== Early life and education ==
Hing was born in Australia to Chinese Australian parents who were both doctors. His mother's family grew up in Walgett and Lightning Ridge in northern New South Wales, while his father is from Maitland and Thursday Island.

Hing grew up in Illawong, in the Sutherland Shire of Sydney. He attended Trinity Grammar School and Caringbah High School. He also worked at a bottle shop in Chinatown, Sydney.

== Career ==
Since 2014, Hing has hosted the podcast Free to a Good Home alongside Ben Jenkins.

From 2015 to 2016, Hing was a host on the ABC programs Good Game: Pocket Edition and Good Game Well Played.

In 2017, he portrayed the character Sam Wu on the Stan comedy television series The Other Guy, which starred comedian Matt Okine.

From 2018 to 2020, he was the host of the SBS documentary series Where Are You Really From?. In 2019, he made multiple appearances on SBS's The Feed.

In 2020, it was announced that Hing would be joining Triple J to replace Veronica Milsom and to become a host of the drive radio show Hobba and Hing alongside Lewis Hobba, who had been in the hosting position since 2015.

In 2021, Hing was announced as a co-host of the SBS panel game show Celebrity Letters and Numbers, alongside David Astle and Lily Serna.

In December 2022, it was announced that Hing would be joining Network 10's current affairs news program The Project in 2023 as a co-host to replace Tommy Little. He hosted the show on Friday and Sunday nights alongside Hamish Macdonald, Georgie Tunny and Sarah Harris.

In July 2023, it was announced that Hing and his radio co-host Lewis Hobba would be leaving Triple J, therefore ending their radio show. The duo hosted a podcast together on ABC Listen called Silver Bullet for the remainder of 2023.

In February 2024, Hobba and Hing started releasing a weekly self-produced podcast simply titled the Hobba and Hing Podcast, announcing in "Ep.-3 Piss Pig" that Silver Bullet had been cancelled by the ABC 'despite its ongoing success' after 16 episodes.

In February 2025, Hing was announced to be the temporary mornings host on Double J, replacing Dylan Lewis who was shifting to afternoons. Hing is continuing to host the slot throughout 2025 with it being unknown when he'll be relieved of the position.

== Personal life ==
Hing was one of 30 Australian men to be nominated for Cleo's Bachelor of the Year in 2015. Hing married lawyer and screenwriter Humyara Mahbub in August 2023.
