= Avni Sali =

Australian professor and surgeon

Avni Sali AM
- Born: 19 October 1940 (age 85); Shepparton, Victoria, Australia
- Education: Monash University
- Occupations: professor, surgeon, clinician and researcher
- Children: 3

Avni Sali, AM (born 19 October 1940) is an Australian professor, surgeon, and academic primarily known for advocating an integrative approach to medicine, combining evidence-based complementary therapies with conventional medicine.

== Education ==
Sali graduated as a medical doctor at Monash University in Melbourne with an MBBS, and was "the first person of Albanian heritage in Australia to attend university", and one of Monash University's first cohort of medical students. He further pursued a PhD at Monash University, graduating in 1977.

== Career ==
=== Surgical career ===
After graduating from Monash University, Sali worked in Scotland, with Sir Andrew Kay, the Regius Professor of Surgery at Glasgow University. After returning to Australia from Scotland in 1977, Sali was appointed as an associate professor at the University of Melbourne. Between 1989 and 1991 he was the deputy chairman and Acting Head of the Department of Surgery at the University of Melbourne. From 1977 to 1995, he was a specialist surgeon at the university's Heidelberg Repatriation Hospital (now called Austin Hospital). During this time Sali was also a contributing author to several abdominal surgery textbooks. Between 2002 and 2004, Sali was director of the Victorian Public Health Research and Education Council.

=== Integrative medicine ===
Avni Sali was appointed as a professor and made Founding Dean of the Graduate School of Integrative Medicine at Swinburne University of Technology (Melbourne) from 1996 until its closure in 2005. The school "offered courses for medical professionals in nutritional and environmental medicine and mind/body medicine and also conducted clinical efficacy trials." Touted as the "first of its type in the world," the school ran numerous research projects in areas including cancer, osteoporosis, Alzheimer's disease and artery disease. Through the School, Sali was involved in the development of an integrative hospital – Swinburne University Hospital, in which "evidence-based complementary treatments [were] integrated with surgery and medicine."

In 2005, Sali founded the National Institute of Integrative Medicine (NIIM), a "not for profit organization conducting research and teaching in Integrative Medicine". NIIM also owns subsidiary clinics offering services including "integrative medicine, osteopathy, naturopathy, IV and chelation therapies, cancer treatments, Chinese herbal medicine/acupuncture, [and] exercise physiology."

Since 1983, Sali has been on the board of directors of the Gawler Cancer Foundation, founded by Ian Gawler. He served as president between 1999 and 2002. He is also the president of the International Council of Integrative Medicine.

In 1992, Sali co-founded the Australasian Integrative Medicine Association (AIMA), where he served two years as president and spent the remaining years as a board member.

In 2009, Sali was appointed honorary professor at University of Queensland. Since 2013 he has been an adjunct professor at the Cairnmillar Institute in Melbourne.

Sali is also an ambassador of ConnectGV, a disability not-for-profit organisation in Victoria.

== Research and publications ==
Sali was "part of the team completing the first study on eating habits at primary schools in 1979 and the first study on football players and how the sport has affected their health." This research was used in the Australian Government's "Life. Be in it." Campaign.

Sali is currently the associate editor of the Journal of Nutritional and Environmental Medicine, previously he was an associate editor of the Journal of Evidence Based Integrative Medicine.

Sali has authored, or co-authored, "several books and approximately 300 articles published in medical journals."

Sali has published several books on surgery and integrative medicine:

- Kotsirilos, Vicki, Luis Vitetta, and Avni Sali. A Guide to Evidence-Based Integrative and Complementary Medicine. Sydney, N.S.W: Elsevier, Churchill, Livingstone, 2011. ISBN 9780729539081
- Kune, Gabriel A, Avni Sali. The Practice of Biliary Surgery. 2nd ed. Oxford: Blackwell Scientific Publications, 1980. ISBN 9780632005895.
- O’Brien, Kylie, Avni Sali, A Clinician's Guide to Integrative Oncology: What You Should Be Talking About with Cancer Patients and Why, Springer, 2017, ISBN 978-3-319-56632-0
- Avni Sali, Dilation of oesophageal strictures. In: Jamieson G (Editor), Surgery of the Upper Gastrointestinal Tract, Fifth Edition, Chapman & Hall Medical, 1994, ISBN 0-412-53550-5
- Avni Sali, Gallstones - Aetiology and Dissolution. In: Schwartz S (Editor), Maingot's Abdominal Operations, Ninth Edition, Appleton & Lange, 1989, ISBN 0-8385-6103-9
- Avni Sali, Laser photocoagulation and Dilation of oesophageal strictures. In: Jamieson G (Editor), Surgery of the Oesophagus, Churchhill Livingstone, 1988, ISBN 0-443-034095

Many of his publications are available on Google Scholar.

== Awards and recognition ==
In 2016, Sali was appointed a Member (AM) of the Order of Australia, the country's order of chivalry. Sali received this award "for significant service to integrative medicine as an educator, clinician and researcher, and to professional education."

- Member of the Order of Australia.
- Recipient, ACNEM Award, Australasian College of Nutritional and Environmental Medicine, 2012, for services to integrative medicine.
- Recipient, St Michael's award for Outstanding Community Service, The Uniting Church Australia, 2002.
  - According to Swinburne University, "Professor Sali received this award for his unusual and highly distinguished contribution to a broader understanding of health and well-being and for his very innovative community education in the field of holistic health."

== Personal life ==
Avni Sali was born in Shepparton, a regional town in Victoria, Australia, after his parents emigrated from Albania. His father was from Voskopojë in southern Albania.

In 2016, Sali's biography, Visionary Man, Visionary Medicine: The Story of Professor Avni Sali and Integrative Medicine, written by Lindy Schneider was published and launched by Jana Wendt and Emeritus Professor John Murtagh AM. It describes Sali's upbringing as part of an immigrant family of tomato farmers living in regional Australia, to his success as a surgeon and academic and controversy in practicing Integrative Medicine.

Sali is married to Hana Sali, a medical scientist. Together they have three children Radek, Lenka and Filip.

Sali's son, Radek Sali, is an Australian 'rich lister' and former CEO of Swisse, an Australian vitamin company. In 2013, the ABC's consumer show The Checkout claimed that Avni Sali "manipulated tests of a Swisse appetite suppressant to benefit the company." Avni Sali sued the ABC for defamation, in a case that went to the Victorian Supreme Court. The case was eventually settled out of court.
