= @Seven =

Television series

- Opening screen
- Also known as: At Seven
- Genre: Comedy
- Presented by: Petra Bagust
- Theme music composer: Sufjan Stevens
- Opening theme: Chicago - Sufjan Stevens
- Country of origin: New Zealand
- No. of seasons: 1
- No. of episodes: 23

Production
- Producer: Jon Bridges
- Camera setup: Multi-camera
- Running time: 30 minutes (including promo breaks)

Original release
- Network: TV3
- Release: 21 December 2009 – 22 January 2010

Related
- 7 Days

At Seven, commonly stylised as @Seven, is a New Zealand comedy show that was broadcast from 2009–2010 in which Petra Bagust and other comedians present the "real news" from the last 24 hours from New Zealand and the rest of the world. The show replaced Campbell Live, a New Zealand current-affairs programme for the Summer Holidays in 2009/2010 whilst Campbell Live took a break. @Seven finished for the 2009/2010 summer holiday break on 22 January 2010 and was replaced with the normal TV3 7pm show, Campbell Live. @Seven did not return the following summer break instead TV3 screened re-runs of Modern Family.

== Notable presenters ==
- Ben Hurley (co-host)
- Steve Wrigley (fill in)
- Dai Henwood (reporter)

=== Auckland reporters ===
- Steve Wrigley

=== Australia reporters ===
- Charlie Pickering

== Public response ==
@Seven received mostly bad reviews after the first episode.

== Revival ==
In 2013 TVNZ released a new show with a similar format and name. The new show titled Seven Sharp is screened on TV One weeknights at 7pm replacing long-running current affairs show Close Up. The main difference between @Seven and Seven Sharp is that Seven Sharp is a permanent show screened all year round.

== Ratings ==
@Seven's premiere ratings were lower than the 2008/2009 summer replacement of Campbell Live, The Simpsons.
