= Doug Chappel =

Australian comedian

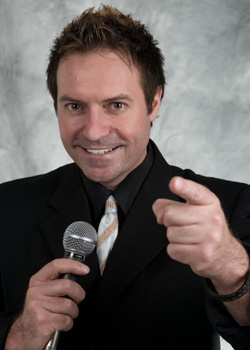
- Born: Melbourne, Victoria, Australia
- Other name: Doug Chappel Jr

Doug Chappel is an Australian comedian who grew up in the working class suburbs of Footscray and Sunshine in Melbourne's Western Suburbs. Chappel is also known for his work in the community with homeless youth and troubled teenagers. Once homeless himself and growing up with a "rough crowd", Chappel draws on his experiences from his past and applies it to his comedy.

In 2016, it was announced that Chappel would be the new Ambassador for the Salvation Army's Westcare lead tenant program as a result of his continued support of the Western Suburbs, and his dedication and commitment to helping disadvantaged youth.

Chappel is known as a versatile performer with shows ranging from performing for the Prime Minister of Australia and other political leaders, to hosting the Australian Adult Industry Awards and Sexpo. Chappel's brand of comedy has been described as "uniquely hilarious" and "charismatic", with appearance on NBC in Los Angeles, the London Comedy Store and he has entertained the troops for the Australian Defence Force in countries such as Afghanistan, Solomon Islands and East Timor. Chappel has also had sold out Melbourne International Comedy Festival shows in 2004, 2005, 2006, 2007 and 2008.

Chappel has not been without his controversy and has been criticised in the past for his close association with many notorious underworld figures such as Mark "Chopper" Read and his comedy show tours with disgraced "AFL agent to the stars" Ricky Nixon which also included colourful 1980s AFL star Warwick Capper.

Chappel is also a passionate supporter of the Western Bulldogs AFL football team and has done numerous shows for them and many other AFL football clubs in the past. In 2016, Chappel was the official comedian at the "Sons of the West" Grand Final Dinner with Western Bulldog premiership stars and captain Bob Murphy, Jake Stringer, Marcus Bontempelli and club legends Doug Hawkins and Tony Liberatore to name a few.

Chappel released 2 CDs in 2004 titled The funniest man on the planet and The Footscray Rap in which he talks about his troubled past, the area in which he grew up and relationships.

== Television ==
Year	Title	Role	Notes
1999	Australia's Most Wanted	Bank Robber	
2001	Stingers	Jack Posey	
2005	Good Friday Appeal	Himself	Guest Comedian
2006	Stand Up Australia	Himself	Guest
2007	The Best of Stand Up Australia	Himself	Guest
2008	Breaking Bad News	Graham Jones	
2009	Insiders	Himself	Guest
2012	Offspring	Bobby	
2014	The Project	Himself	
2014	A Current Affair	Himself	

== Filmography ==
Year	Title	Role	Notes
2014	Groomless Bride	Peter	
2014	Milk and Cookies	Ray	
2015	The Heckler	Burger guy	
