= The Weekly with Charlie Pickering =

- Also known as: The Weekly
- Genre: Comedy, news satire
- Written by: Gerard McCulloch; Chris Kennett; Tom Gleeson; Scott Abbot; Cal Wilson; Michael Chamberlin; Daniel Burt; Kitty Flanagan
- Presented by: Charlie Pickering
- Starring: Tom Gleeson; Kitty Flanagan; Adam Briggs; Judith Lucy; Luke McGregor; Rhys Nicholson; Zoë Coombs Marr
- Opening theme: The Weekly ABC TV Theme
- Composers: On The Sly Music, Ali Rezakhani Music
- Country of origin: Australia
- Original language: English
- No. of seasons: 11
- No. of episodes: 185 (list of episodes)

Production
- Executive producers: Charlie Pickering; Kevin Whyte; Chris Walker
- Production locations: Melbourne, Victoria
- Running time: 30 minutes

Original release
- Network: ABC
- Release: 22 April 2015 – present

Related
- Hard Quiz

The Weekly with Charlie Pickering is an Australian news satire series on the ABC. The series premiered on 22 April 2015, featuring Charlie Pickering as host with Tom Gleeson, Adam Briggs and Judith Lucy in the cast who joined the show in 2019, replacing Kitty Flanagan.

On 18 September 2015, the series was renewed for a second season, which premiered on 3 February 2016. On 2 November 2016, the series was renewed for a third season, which premiered on 1 February 2017. The fourth season premiered on 2 May 2018 at the later time slot of 9:05pm to make room for the series return of Gruen at 8:30pm and was signed on for 20 episodes.

In addition to the series renewal in September 2015, a one-off special titled The Yearly was commissioned, which premiered on 16 December 2015. A second Yearly special aired the following year, premiering on 14 December 2016.

On the final episode of season 4 of the series, Kitty Flanagan announced that she would be leaving the show. Flanagan made one final appearance on The Yearly with Charlie Pickering. In 2019, the series was renewed for a fifth season with Judith Lucy announced as a new addition to the cast as a "wellness expert". In 2020, the show was filmed without a live audience due to coronavirus pandemic restrictions and comedian Luke McGregor joined the show as a regular contributor. Judith Lucy did not return in 2021 and Zoë Coombs Marr joined as a new cast member in season 7 with the running joke that she was fired from the show in episode one, yet she kept returning to work for the show.

== Format ==
The show starts with a cold open which consists of a short introduction to the guests and main stories coming up. The program's format has been compared to Last Week Tonight with John Oliver, following a similar structure. Pickering delivers a selection of the past week's news stories interspersed with jokes. Similarly to The Daily Show, most episodes feature a cross to a specialised correspondent (including Adam Briggs, Loyiso Gola, Jonathan Pie, Tiff Stevenson, and Wyatt Cenac) and/or an interview with a guest. A previously prepared sketch, story or interview was often presented by Tom Gleeson and Judith Lucy. The show was pre-recorded in front of an audience in ABC's Ripponlea studio on the same day of its airing from 2015 to 2017. In 2018, the fourth series episodes were pre-recorded in front of an audience at the ABC Southbank Centre studios.

Gleeson's interview segment Hard Chat is inspired by Between Two Ferns with Zach Galifianakis and was later spun off into a quiz show entitled Hard Quiz. In 2020, the segment appeared with new titling and a new format, called Yard Chat. This was due to the COVID-19 pandemic in Australia, which forced Gleeson to work from home and do the chat "in his yard".

Film critic Margaret Pomeranz has also had a slot as a guest reviewer, giving humorous reviews of TV shows, such as Married at First Sight Below Deck,, Love in the Jungle and Hard Quiz .

== Episodes ==
Series	Episodes	Originally released	
Series	Episodes	First released	Last released
1	20	22 April 2015	2 September 2015
2	14	3 February 2016	4 May 2016
3	20	1 February 2017	14 June 2017
4	20	2 May 2018	12 September 2018
5	14	20 March 2019	19 June 2019
6	14	29 April 2020	29 July 2020
7	16	3 February 2021	19 May 2021
8	12	27 April 2022	13 July 2022
9	19	8 February 2023	14 June 2023
10	14	7 February 2024	8 May 2024
11	12	12 March 2025	28 May 2025
12	15	14 January 2026	22 April 2026
Specials	10	16 December 2015	18 December 2024

== The Yearly with Charlie Pickering ==
The Yearly with Charlie Pickering is an annual special which relives the year's highlights and lowlights. It concludes with The Weekly's Person of the Year. The first show screened on 16 December 2015.

== Awards and nominations ==
Year	Award	Category	Recipients and nominees	Result	Refs.
2015	5th AACTA Awards	Best Light Entertainment Television Series	Charlie Pickering, Kevin Whyte, Chris Walker, Frank Bruzzese	Won	
2016	Logie Awards	Most Outstanding Entertainment Program	The Weekly with Charlie Pickering	Nominated	
2017	Logie Awards	Most Outstanding Entertainment Program	The Weekly with Charlie Pickering	Nominated	
2018	8th AACTA Awards	Best Entertainment Program	The Weekly with Charlie Pickering; Chris Walker, Kevin Whyte, Charlie Pickering, Jo Long	Won	
2020	10th AACTA Awards	Best Entertainment Program	The Weekly with Charlie Pickering; Chris Walker, Kevin Whyte, Charlie Pickering, Jo Long	Nominated	
2024	13th AACTA Awards	Best Comedy Entertainment Program	The Weekly with Charlie Pickering; Chris Walker, Kevin Whyte, Charlie Pickering, Julia Holmes	Nominated	
2024	13th AACTA Awards	Best Comedy Performer: Charlie Pickering	The Weekly with Charlie Pickering; Chris Walker, Kevin Whyte, Charlie Pickering, Julia Holmes	Nominated	
2025	Logie Awards	Best Comedy Entertainment Program	The Weekly with Charlie Pickering	Nominated	
