= Back Seat Drivers =

Australian television show

Back Seat Drivers is a conversational-style Australian television program which first screened on ABC2 in 2014. The 11 part series is hosted by Veronica Milsom and features comedians and entertainers driving taxis, talking to ordinary passengers who often share extraordinary stories. These include Andrew O'Keefe, Mel Buttle, Ronny Chieng, Tommy Little, Jordan Raskopoulos and Tegan Higginbotham.

== See also ==
- The Agony of Life
