= Hungry Beast =

- Created by: Andrew Denton; Jon Casimir; Andy Nehl
- Directed by: Aaron Smith; Ali Russell
- Presented by: Hosts; Dan Ilic; Kirsten Drysdale; Nicholas Hayden; Monique Schafter; Current Reporters; Marc Fennell; Veronica Milsom; Kirk Docker; Elmo Keep; Ali Russell; Lewis Hobba; Scott Mitchell; Nicholas McDougall; Season 1-2 Only; Chris Leben; Jessicah Mendes; Kieran Ricketts; Daniel Keogh; Nathan Earl
- Country of origin: Australia
- Original language: English
- No. of seasons: 3
- No. of episodes: 32

Production
- Executive producers: Andrew Denton; Anita Jacoby
- Cinematography: Aaron Smith; Ali Russell; Susan Lumsdon
- Editors: Nicholas Hayden; Nicholas McDougall; Andrew Glover

Original release
- Network: ABC1
- Release: 30 September 2009 – 2011

Hungry Beast (originally Projext NEXT) is an Australian television comedy and current affairs program that was broadcast on ABC Television.

== Format ==
The show was a half-hour program and is structured as a hybrid between a current affairs program and a satire/comedy show. The presenters were initially given a single editorial instruction: "Tell me something I don't know". Rather than conforming to a strict format, the final shape evolved alongside the presentation team that had been assembled. As a result, prior to the show's debut executive producer Andrew Denton described it as "unclassifiable" due to the chaotic nature of the work, likening the show's format to the Internet.

Originally 19 presenters were used, but the second season saw the hosts pared down to just four, Kirsten Drysdale, Nicholas Hayden, Dan Ilic and Monique Schafter, although some of the other presenters continue to report onscreen. During the second season of Hungry Beast reporters Ali Russell and Kirk Docker were nominated for a Walkley Award for Coverage of Indigenous Affairs for their story on the "Gang of 49". Hungry Beast also was nominated for an ATOM Award in the Best Multimedia category, and an AFI Award for Best Light Entertainment.

== Pre-broadcast marketing ==
Prior to the debut of the first series, Hungry Beast's pre-broadcast publicity incorporated perpetrating a hoax upon several Australian news agencies, in which they constructed a media release by the fictitious Levitt Institute. The release discussed a report called "Deception Detection Across Australian Populations", which looked at the comparative gullibility of people in different Australian states, and the release used a website and altered Wikipedia articles to provide support for the document. The hoax was successful, with a number of Australian media groups, including the AAP, running stories based on the material. When revealed, the hoax was criticised by the AAP who stated that they were "... disappointed that an individual, or organisation, would go to such lengths to take advantage of the Australian media and ultimately the Australian public."

While the first episode presented their hoax on Australian media, in their third season, the show covered the blog of Amina Abdallah Arraf al Omari, also known as A Gay Girl in Damascus, as a true story. Only after their final episode was broadcast it was reported that this story was itself a hoax.

== History ==
Hungry Beast was broadcast on Wednesday nights on ABC1 and repeated on Thursday night on ABC2. It was produced by Andrew Denton's production company, Zapruder's Other Films. Auditions were held in January 2009, with the presenting team announced that September.

The third and final season of Hungry Beast began on ABC1 on Wednesday 23 March 2011 at 9:30pm with a smaller, more streamlined production team. The 12-week season has each episode themed around specific issues (e.g. Secrets, Waste, Captivity, Faking It, Download, Perfection and Wealth). Regular segments include Vox pops, "Follow The Money" and "The Beast File".

On 29 November 2011, executive producer Andrew Denton confirmed that the show had been cancelled.
