= Alex Lee (comedian) =

Australian comedian, writer, actress and television presenter

- Born: Alexandra Clair Lee; 1986 or 1987 (age 39–40)
- Known for: The Checkout, The Feed, Win the Week
- Children: 1

Alexandra Clair Lee (born 1986 or 1987) is an Australian comedian, writer, actor, and television presenter. She has appeared in a range of comedy television series on the ABC and SBS, including The Feed and several programs by The Chaser team. She is also the host of the ABC quiz show Win the Week, starring alongside Craig Reucassel.

== Early life ==
Lee was born to an Australian mother and a Chinese father, who met in Sydney in 1975. She grew up in Southern Sydney, and studied journalism at the University of Sydney.

== Career ==
Lee began her career in journalism, as a producer for ABC News 24. She took part in the Walkley Foundation's Australia-Korea Media Exchange Program, and later became a political reporter for BuzzFeed. Having performed in comedy shows at university, she became a presenter and writer for the ABC's satirical news program The Roast in 2014.

Having collaborated with The Chaser on The Roast, Lee went on to appear in The Chaser's Media Circus, The Checkout, and The Chaser’s Election Desk. In 2017, Lee starred in Michelle Law's play Single Asian Female. Since 2018, Lee has also been featured as a presenter and comedy actor on The Feed. A segment she presented about retiring radio shock-jock Alan Jones prompted a lawsuit from Jones in 2020. The lawsuit was settled later that year. The segment was taken down but neither SBS nor Lee was required to apologize or offer financial compensation. In 2025, Jones was charged with 35 counts of alleged sexual misconduct, including assault.

Lee was a writer and cast member for Rove McManus' short-lived variety show Saturday Night Rove in 2019. In 2021, Lee was announced as the host for Win the Week, appearing alongside Craig Reucassel in a new quiz show airing on the ABC. In 2025 she appeared as a contestant on Claire Hooper's House Of Games. In 2026 Lee hosted Tonight at The Museum, a comedy panel show filmed on location in the Tasmanian Museum and Art Gallery.

Lee is also a regular player on Dragon Friends, a Dungeons & Dragons-themed podcast and live show.

== Personal life ==
Lee attended Danebank School in Hurstville from Kindergarten to Year 12 and served as School Captain of both the Junior School and the Senior School.

She is married and gave birth to a son in 2019.

Her brother is Riordan “Rio” Lee, a producer and on‑air contributor to Gold Network’s The Christian O'Connell Show.
