= Michael Chamberlin (comedian) =

Australian comedian

Michael Chamberlin is a Melbourne-based stand up comedian. Along with fellow comedian Charlie Pickering, Chamberlin was a co-creator of Melbourne comedy room Stagetime.

In 2001, Chamberlin made the grand final of the Australia wide comedy competition Raw Comedy. In 2002, Chamberlin joined forces with Charlie Pickering, winning the comedians' choice Piece of Wood Award for their show Boiling Point. Chamberlin has performed in major comedy Festivals around Australia, including the Melbourne International Comedy Festival and the Adelaide Fringe Festival. He presented his first full-length festival show I Am The King of the Divan in 2004 as part of the Melbourne Fringe Festival. He appeared in the Melbourne Comedy Festival in 2005 with his show There's A Party At Stefan Edberg's Place, and in 2006 with Michael Chamberlin & the Ten Commandments.

Chamberlin was also a core cast member and writer for the Australian sketch comedy television show skitHOUSE from 2003 - 2004. He has also written for television shows Rove Live, Backberner and Comedy Inc.

In 2008, Chamberlin co-hosted Foxtel's TV series The Mansion with Charlie Pickering.

In 2015 Chamberlin began writing for The Weekly with Charlie Pickering.

== Live shows ==
- 2000/01: Chamberlin joined sketch comedy group Enter the Datsun for two Melbourne Comedy Festival shows
- 2002: Boiling Point - With Charlie Pickering, Adelaide Fringe Festival, Melbourne Comedy Festival
- 2003: Equal Third - With Terri Psiakis & Charlie Pickering, Melbourne Comedy Festival
- 2003: Boiling Point 2 - With Charlie Pickering, Melbourne Comedy Festival
- 2004: I Am The King of the Divan - Solo Show, Melbourne Fringe Festival
- 2005: Michael Chamberlin - Solo Show, Adelaide Comedy Festival
- 2005: There's A Party At Stefan Edberg's Place - Solo Show, Melbourne International Comedy Festival
- 2006: Michael Chamberlin & the Ten Commandments - Solo Show, Adelaide Fringe Festival, Melbourne International Comedy Festival
- 2007: Buddha, Bluey and Me - Solo Show, Melbourne International Comedy Festival
- 2008: Flair Country - Solo Show, Melbourne International Comedy Festival
- 2010: Keep yourself nice - Solo Show, Melbourne International Comedy Festival
- 2011: Things I Haven't Done - Solo Show, Melbourne International Comedy Festival
- 2012: Joy and Despair - Solo Show, Melbourne International Comedy Festival
- 2015: Thoughts - Solo Show, Melbourne International Comedy Festival
- 2017: Life in Moderation - Melbourne International Comedy Festival
