= The Feed (Australian TV series) =

Australian television series (2013–2022)

- Genre: News and satire program
- Created by: Paul Cutler
- Presented by: Marc Fennell; Alice Matthews; Alex Lee
- Starring: Jan Fran; Michael Hing; Mark Humphries; Dan Ilic; Lawrence Leung; Alice Matthews; Tania Safi; Michelle Rimmer; Rebecca Metcalf; David Maalso; Laura Murphy-Oates; Lee Lin Chin; Kirsten Drysdale; Virginia Langenberg; Jenna Owen; Andy Park; Vic Zerbst
- Country of origin: Australia
- Original language: English
- No. of series: 9
- No. of episodes: 600

Production
- Executive producer: Mike Clay
- Producer: Una Butorac
- Running time: 30 minutes

Original release
- Network: SBS2/SBS Viceland; SBS
- Release: 20 May 2013 – 28 June 2022

The Feed is an Australian news, current affairs and satire television series that began airing on SBS 2 on 20 May 2013 and continued through several series and with several changes of presenters until it became a digital only production in May 2022.

== Broadcast history ==
The Feed was created by SBS former Director of News and Current Affairs Paul Cutler, who enlisted pop culture journalist Patrick Abboud to help assemble a crew to produce a 15-minute daily show. Nick Hayden was the first executive producer when season one began airing in 2013, with presenters Patrick Abboud, Marc Fennell, Jan Fran, and Andy Park.

The series episodes were extended for following seasons to a full 30 minute segment daily, with a mix of in-depth features, news headlines and comedy skits. Several guests presenters have appeared on The Feed including Lee Lin Chin, Dan Ilic, Kirsten Drysdale, Lawrence Leung, Good Game's Michael Hing, Mark Humphries, and others. In 2015, Park departed the show to become a reporter on ABC's 7.30 current affairs show.

The Feed was then co-hosted at various times by Marc Fennell, Jan Fran, Laura Murphy-Oates (from NITV), and others for some years.

In 2020 The Feed moved to a weekly format, and switched to the SBS main channel, airing at 10:00pm, and following long-time current affairs programs Insight at 8.30pm and Dateline at 9:30pm.

In May 2022, SBS announced it would end the series due to declining audience figures, with its final episode airing on 28 June. Content under The Feed brand would continue to be made for SBS On Demand and social media.

== Awards ==
- In 2015, The Feed was nominated for a Logie Award in the Most Outstanding Public Affairs Report category for their story "Ice Towns".
- In 2016, Chin was nominated for the Gold and Silver Logie Awards for her work on the series and on SBS World News.
- In 2017 producer Elise Potaka won an Amnesty International Australia Media Award for her story "Forced to Marry"
- In July 2018 reporter Laura Murphy-Oates won the Young Journalist of the Year Walkley Award.
- In November 2018 the UN Day Media Award was won by producer Una Butorac for her story "Foul play: Are clubs killing community sport?".
- In 2019 Fran won the 2019 Walkley Award for Best Commentary for her "Frant" segments.
- In 2020 Marty Smiley, Jack Tullerners and Pat Forrest won the Best Visual Storytelling Young Walkley award for their feature on the Christian Democratic Party, while Ella Archibald-Binge was awarded the longform feature prize for her piece on Australia's stolen wages scheme.
- In 2022 Rebecca Metcalf and Patrick Forrest won a Young Walkley award for best visual storytelling for their documentary 'Surviving a Love Scam'
