= Charlie Pickering =

Australian comedian and presenter

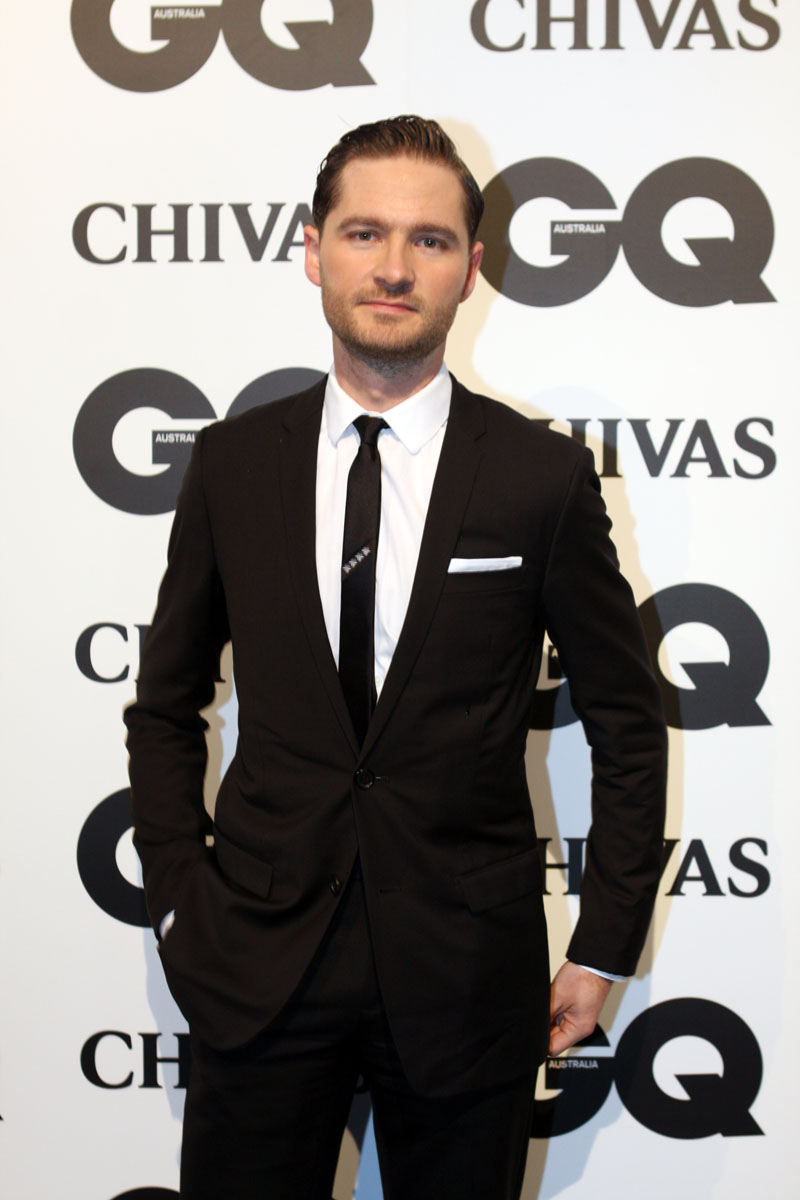
- Pickering at GQ Australia Men of the Year Awards in 2011
- Born: 29 August 1977 (age 49); Melbourne, Victoria, Australia
- Occupations: Comedian; television presenter; radio presenter; author; producer
- Years active: 2002–present
- Television: The Weekly with Charlie Pickering
- Spouse: Sarah Krasnostein (m. 2013)
- Children: 2
- Website: charliepickering.com

Charlie Pickering (born 29 August 1977) is an Australian television and radio presenter, author, and producer.

As of 2025 Pickering hosts The Weekly with Charlie Pickering, a weekly news satire television show on the ABC, as well as its yearly spin-off special The Yearly with Charlie Pickering. He also co-hosts Tomorrow Tonight with Annabel Crabb and Adam Liaw.

He is known as a former co-host on the current affairs program The Project and Friday host of Breakfast on ABC Radio Melbourne. He also regularly appeared on the game show Talkin' 'Bout Your Generation as the "Generation X" team captain.

== Early life and education ==
Charlie Pickering was born in Melbourne on 29 August 1977. He attended St Leonard's College and Brighton Grammar School.

== Career ==
=== Early career ===
Pickering first worked as a lawyer.

He appeared with the sketch comedy group Enter the Datsun in the Melbourne International Comedy Festival (MICF) in 1998, 1999, and 2002. He had left his job as a lawyer by 2002, when he appeared in MICF with Michael Chamberlin in Boiling Point, a show which earned them the Piece of Wood Award. In 2003, Pickering and Chamberlin teamed up again in Boiling Point 2, the pair also appearing the same year with fellow comedian Terri Psiakis in Equal Third.

In 2004, Pickering appeared in Revolver. In 2005, Pickering launched Betterman at the MICF, a show he went on to tour in New Zealand. In 2006, he presented his show Auto at the Melbourne International Comedy Festival, receiving a nomination for the Barry Award. For the April 2013 Melbourne International Comedy festival, he co-hosted with Waleed Aly a series of shows titled The World's Problems Solved.

=== Television ===
In 2008, Pickering co-hosted a show with Michael Chamberlin on The Comedy Channel called The Mansion. The series ran for 13 episodes. Pickering hosted season 3 of Channel V's travelling game show, Cash Cab. From 2009 to 2012, he was a team captain on Network Ten's quiz show Talkin' 'Bout Your Generation, representing Generation X.

In July 2009, he became a co-host on Network Ten's infotainment program, The Project, with Carrie Bickmore and Dave Hughes. On 12 March 2014, Pickering announced that he was leaving The Project, and in April 2015 he started hosting a weekly comedy/news satire program on ABC entitled The Weekly with Charlie Pickering.

In 2018, Pickering hosted Tomorrow Tonight on the ABC with Annabel Crabb.

Other television appearances include Rove Live, The Glass House, Today, Stand Up! (ABC), The 2006 Melbourne International Comedy Festival Gala (Network Ten), @Seven, The Project, Hughesy, We Have a Problem, Show Me the Movie!, Celebrity Name Game and Would I Lie to You? Australia. In 2025, he appeared as a contestant on Claire Hooper's House Of Games. Pickering was announced as a contestant on series 6 of Taskmaster Australia in July 2026.

=== Radio ===
Pickering’s radio career began at youth broadcaster Triple J, initially appearing as a guest on the breakfast show at the invitation of host and comedian Wil Anderson. In 2002, he moved into a full‑time presenting role when he was appointed host of the station’s Drive program, a position he held through 2003.

In December 2022, ABC announced that Pickering would host ABC Radio Melbourne's Breakfast program on Fridays from January 2023, while Sammy J would be hosting the Monday through Thursday shows. He remained in the position until December 2023 as it was announced that Sammy J would return to hosting Breakfast five days a week.

He began hosting the program Thank God It's Friday on ABC Radio Melbourne, ABC Radio Sydney, and ABC Radio National stations after Richard Glover retired at the end of 2024.

In May 2026, Pickering was appointed as the new host of ABC Radio Melbourne's Drive, after Ali Moore announced her resignation from the program.

=== Publications ===
Pickering published his first book, Impractical Jokes, in 2010.

== Personal life ==
Pickering is married to writer Sarah Krasnostein. They have two children. He converted to Judaism in 2013.

== Political views ==
When co-hosting The Project, Pickering said that he had voted Liberal once.

New Matilda described The Weekly with Charlie Pickering as "a satirical news program with a progressive bent". On the program, Pickering has used his editorials to support halal certification and gay marriage, and to speak out against the detention of asylum seekers.

He has been a strong critic of the Catholic Church. In June 2018 he denounced the Catholic seal of the confessional, and in March 2019, he ridiculed people who questioned the guilt of Cardinal George Pell in a segment of The Weekly he called "The Pedo Files".

== Selected works ==
- Pickering, Charlie. Impractical Jokes, Sydney: Allen & Unwin, 2010, ISBN 9781741757262
