= Terri Psiakis =

Australian comedian

Terri Psiakis is an Australian comedian and a presenter on radio and television.

== Radio ==
Psiakis is a Saturday morning presenter on Melbourne radio station Triple M. Previously she was a casual presenter on Triple J, and her appearances most notably included co-presenting the Ross and Terri show with Ross Noble. Terri was also a regular guest of the former afternoon show Top Shelf Radio with Robbie Buck.

== Television ==
Psiakis has also appeared on the ABC's TV series Spicks and Specks and is a presenter on The Comedy Channel.

== Publishing ==
Psiakis wrote a book based on her experiences at her wedding, Tying the Knot Without Doing Your Block.
