= The Hamster Wheel =

2011–2012 Australian TV series

- Genre: Comedy, satire
- Created by: The Chaser
- Starring: Andrew Hansen; Chas Licciardello; Julian Morrow; Craig Reucassel; Chris Taylor
- Country of origin: Australia
- Original language: English
- No. of series: 2
- No. of episodes: 16

Production
- Executive producers: Julian Morrow; Martin Robertson
- Producer: Andy Nehl
- Production location: Sydney
- Running time: 30 minutes
- Production companies: Giant Dwarf Pty. Ltd. Cordell Jigsaw Zapruder

Original release
- Network: ABC1
- Release: 5 October 2011 – 14 November 2012

Related
- Yes We Canberra!

The Hamster Wheel is an Australian television satirical comedy series broadcast on the Australian Broadcasting Corporation (ABC) television station ABC1. It is created and presented by the satirical group The Chaser.

== Production ==
In July 2011, TV Tonight reported that The Chaser were working on developing a new television show. In August 2011, the Australian Broadcasting Corporation announced the Chaser team would return in a new show titled The Hamster Wheel. The first of eight episodes aired on 5 October 2011. In November 2011, it was confirmed that The Chaser would return to television in 2012, however, it was not confirmed whether they would return with another season of The Hamster Wheel.

On 31 August 2012, ABC announced The Hamster Wheel would return for a second series. On 26 September 2012, the second series premiered on ABC1.

== Show format ==
The Hamster Wheel is set within a large hamster cage, with a small hamster, named after their desk Horace, is hidden in one of the scenes. The locations of Horace are revealed on The Hamster Wheel website shortly after the airing of the episode.

=== Segments ===
==== Primary ====
- News of the Week (Introduction) - This starts with Julian Morrow, Craig Reucassel and Chris Taylor sitting at their Hamster-shaped desk, talking about stories that made headlines in the past week.
- Inside the Wheel - Usually followed by "News of the Week", a segment presented by Andrew Hansen and Chas Licciardello, on a particular topic on the latest headlines.
- Politics with Cats - A segment in season 1, Hansen describes a political story of the week using a selection of YouTube cat videos.
- In the Media - A segment in season 2, Hansen and Licciardello talk about a topic on what's going on in the Australian media.

==== Recurring ====
- Standby Obituaries - Julian talks about the death of an Australian political or another famous person for when they die. Julian talks about from when they were born to the present day.

== Episodes ==
No	Airdate	Viewers	Rank		
No	Airdate	Viewers	Timeslot	Day	Week
Series 1
1	5 October 2011	857,000	1	10	30
2	12 October 2011	823,000	1	11	35
3	19 October 2011	815,000	1	10	—N/a
4	26 October 2011	866,000	1	11	—N/a
5	2 November 2011	766,000	2	13	—N/a
6	9 November 2011	876,000	1	9	24
7	16 November 2011	920,000	1	9	—N/a
8	23 November 2011	950,000	1	9	—N/a
Series 2
1	26 September 2012	784,000	3	12	—N/a
2	3 October 2012	791,000	2	12	—N/a
3	10 October 2012	843,000	2	12	—N/a
4	17 October 2012	875,000	2	11	—N/a
5	24 October 2012	795,000	2	14	—N/a
6	31 October 2012	671,000	2	15	—N/a
7	7 November 2012	639,000	3	15	—N/a
8	14 November 2012	606,000	3	17	—N/a

== Reception and ratings ==
Initially, the return of The Chaser team to television was welcomed; however, many criticised the lack of Chaser-esque stunts in The Hamster Wheel. Paul Kalina from the Sydney Morning Herald stated The Hamster Wheel was "one of their best outings yet" and left him asking for more. David Knox from TV Tonight commented that "by the time show was over I felt a bit exhausted but only having enjoyed a handful of laughs". Throughout the first series, The Hamster Wheel retained an average viewing audience of approximately 860,000 viewers, ranking it first for its time slot for all but one of the aired episodes.

The second series debuted to a smaller audience of 784,000, ranking 3rd for the timeslot and 12th for the night.
