= D.J. McPherson =

- Occupations: Writer; Director; Producer; Showrunner
- Years active: 2013–present
- Known for: Run Rabbit Run; The Infernal Machine; Seriously Red

D.J. McPherson is a two-time Emmy Award-nominated screenwriter, producer, director and showrunner recognized for her contributions to film and television. With a career spanning psychological thrillers, horror, science fiction, and comedy, McPherson has shaped a diverse body of work featuring collaborations with acclaimed talents like Diane Keaton, Guy Pearce, Sarah Snook, Simon Pegg, Michael Shannon, Eva Longoria and Rose Byrne. As a creator, McPherson draws on her theatre background to shape distinctive narratives for the screen.

== Early life and career beginnings ==
McPherson initially pursued a career as a theatre actor, touring internationally performing in dramatic stage productions in her early years. A knee injury forced her to shift focus from acting to writing and producing. Her early screen credits include work as writer and producer on the teen drama series Marooned (2007–2009) as well as small acting roles in television series. She later created, produced, and directed the animated series Get Ace, which premiered on Hulu in 2014. The series was nominated for an International Emmy Award in 2015.

== Feature film career ==
McPherson has built a career as a producer, executive producer and screenwriter in feature films. As a producer, her credits include Arthur's Whisky (2023), a comedy starring Diane Keaton, Boy George, and Lulu, launched as a Sky Cinema original, and Dead Guy (TBA), a dark comedy featuring Michael Shannon, Eva Longoria, Judy Greer, and Luis Guzmán, the debut production from her co-founded company Filmology Features. She also executive produced The Infernal Machine (2022), a psychological thriller with Guy Pearce, distributed by Paramount Pictures, Run Rabbit Run (2023), a horror film with Sarah Snook, released on Netflix, and Nandor Fodor and the Talking Mongoose (2023), a dark comedy starring Simon Pegg and Minnie Driver. In screenwriting, McPherson won the Grand Prize at Animal Logic's Truant Pictures Screenplay Competition in 2019 for her mystery-thriller script His Name is Jeremiah, with Truant Pictures executive Greg Schmidt noting, "D.J.'s writing caught our eye immediately with characters that grabbed us from page one and a story that consistently delivered solid drama, chills and suspense." She also won the Grand Prize at the 2019 Creative Screenwriting Unique Voices Competition for her science fiction thriller The First Law, and scripts have also ranked highly on the Black List and placed as a finalist in several other screenwriting contests.

== Television Work ==
McPherson has established a notable career in television as a creator, producer, director, as well as a composer and songwriter. She created, produced, and directed the animated series Get Ace, which premiered on Hulu in 2014, following a teenager turned secret agent. McPherson also wrote the series theme song, earning her a 2014 Screen Music Award for Best Music for Children's Television, alongside an AWGIE Award for Best Animation that year. The series received nominations for an International Emmy Award for best Kids: Animation in 2015 and an AACTA Award for Best Children's Television Series in 2015, a Pulcinella Award at Cartoons on the Bay in 2015, and an Apollo Award for Best 2D Animation in 2015, among other honors. As an executive producer, McPherson's television credits also include music series Heart&Soul, which ran from 2013 to 2015 and was nominated for an Emmy Award. She also executive produced both series of the crime drama Troppo, starring Thomas Jane, with the first series launching on ABC in 2022 and the second in 2024, both later acquired by Amazon Prime Video.

== Personal life ==
McPherson resides in Melbourne and Los Angeles, maintaining ties to both Australian and American film and television industries. Her shift from theatre acting to screenwriting, prompted by a knee injury, shaped her approach to storytelling. Her recovery from heart surgery in Virginia further influenced her early screenwriting, including the mystery-thriller script His Name is Jeremiah.

== Filmography ==
- His Name is Jeremiah (TBA) – writer / producer
- The First Law (TBA) – writer / producer
- Everything I Never Did (TBA) – writer / producer
- The Florist (TBA) – executive producer
- Dead Guy (2025) – executive producer
- Killing Faith (2025) – executive producer
- Classified (2024) – executive producer
- Arthur's Whisky (2024) – executive producer
- Chief of Station (2024) – executive producer
- The Beast Within (2024) – executive producer
- Nandor Fodor and the Talking Mongoose (2023) – executive producer
- Run Rabbit Run (2023) – executive producer
- The Infernal Machine (2022) – executive producer
- Mercy Road (2023) – executive producer
- Troppo (2022–2024) – executive producer
- Love in Bloom (2022) – executive producer
- Seriously Red (2022) – executive producer
- Sit. Stay. Love. (2020) – executive producer
- Never Too Late (2020) – executive producer
- Get Ace (2014–2017) – creator / writer / showrunner / producer / director
- Heart&Soul (2013–2015) – executive producer
- Rock It! (2007) - creator / actress
