= Jack Christian =

Film producer

- Occupations: Producer; Writer; Director
- Years active: 2000–present
- Organization: CEO Filmology Finance CEO Filmology Features Former Chairman of the Australian Film Institute Former Chairman of the Australian Academy of Cinema & Television Arts Member of International Academy of Television Arts & Sciences
- Known for: The Infernal Machine; The Beast Within; Run Rabbit Run; Dead Guy; Everything I Never Did

Jack Christian is a film and television showrunner, producer, writer and director. He has received critical acclaim for his work in screen entertainment, including two Emmy Award nominations.

== Career ==
Christian is founder and CEO of global film and television production and finance company Filmology Finance, and its production arm, Filmology Features. He is the chairman of the Australian Film Institute and the Australian Academy of Cinema and Television Arts and is a member of the International Academy of Television Arts and Sciences.

=== Film and television ===
Christian's film and television work includes The Florist with Dennis Quaid and Jean Reno, western thriller Killing Faith starring Guy Pearce and Bill Pullman, the Michael Shannon, Eva Longoria dark comedy Dead Guy, horror feature The Beast Within starring Kit Harington, thriller Mercy Road starring Luke Bracey, The Infernal Machine starring Guy Pearce, Sarah Snook horror Run Rabbit Run, comedy Nandor Fodor and the Talking Mongoose starring Simon Pegg, spy actioner Chief of Station, the Diane Keaton comedy Arthur's Whisky, action thriller Classified, the Netflix series Dive Club, and the Amazon crime seriesTroppo.

It was announced on April 22, 2024, that Christian is producing upcoming Mckenna Grace YA feature film, Everything I Never Did.

=== International screen advocacy ===
Christian has advocated international co-production as a way of bringing the creative and commercial sides of filmmaking together through packaging projects, securing finance and assembling the production partners needed to get them made. Drawing on his work producing and financing films in Australia, the Americas, Europe and the United Kingdom, he has discussed how producers bring together talent, investment and production facilities across countries, using pre-sales, private finance, debt, and production incentives to build a workable finance package. Through industry talks, panel discussions and workshops at the Cannes International Film Festival, MIPCOM, MIPJunior, the Melbourne International Film Festival and the Australian Academy of Cinema and Television Arts Festival, he has explored how producers take projects from script to screen and position them for international buyers and audiences.

Christian's industry work across Asia has included talks and screen industry engagements in the Philippines, Singapore and Malaysia. In China, Christian has engaged with government, film-industry bodies, and producers to advance Australia-China screen collaborations, with a focus on production financing, international co-production, and opportunities to distribute Australian films in the Chinese market. Working with the National Foundation for Australia-China Relations for the Filming In Australia forum during the Shanghai International Film Festival market, he joined Australian and Chinese producers to explore cross-border production. Speaking about cultural exchange between two industries, Christian said, "Australian screen culture is strongest when our films are not only celebrated at home, but apart of major international conversations."

== Filmography ==
Year	Title	Film / Series	Role
2007	Rock It!	Series	Jupiter Jack / Producer
2012	Conspiracy 365	Series	Consultant Producer
2013–2015	Heart&Soul	Series	Executive Producer
2014–2017	Get Ace	Series	Showrunner / Producer / Director
2020	Never Too Late	Film	Executive Producer
2020	Black Water: Abyss	Film	Executive Producer
2021	Great White	Film	Executive Producer
2021	Dive Club	Series	Executive Producer
2022	Seriously Red	Film	Executive Producer
2022	Love in Bloom	Film	Executive Producer
2022	The Reef: Stalked	Film	Producer
2022	The Infernal Machine	Film	Executive Producer
2022–2024	Troppo	Series	Executive Producer
2023	Run Rabbit Run	Film	Executive Producer
2023	Nandor Fodor and the Talking Mongoose	Film	Producer
2023	Mercy Road	Film	Executive Producer
2024	Arthur's Whisky	Film	Executive Producer
2024	5lbs of Pressure	Film	Executive Producer
2024	Chief of Station	Film	Executive Producer
2024	Classified	Film	Executive Producer
2024	The Beast Within	Film	Producer
2025	Killing Faith	Film	Executive Producer
2025	It Will Find You	Film	Executive Producer
2026	The Florist	Film	Executive Producer
TBA	Dead Guy	Film	Producer
TBA	Red Rock Run	Film	Executive Producer
TBA	Everything I Never Did	Film	Producer

== Australian Academy of Cinema and Television Arts Leadership ==
Jack Christian joined the board of the Australian Film Institute (AFI) in 2020. The AFI governs the Australian Academy of Cinema and Television Arts (AACTA), an organisation established in 2011 to honour excellence in film, television, and screen arts through its annual awards. Christian became chairman on 20 November 2023, outlining his ambition to promote Australian screen storytelling worldwide. In a statement on his appointment, he said, “I am profoundly honoured and humbled to take on the role of Chairperson for the AFI AACTA. This Academy represents the pinnacle of cinematic and television artistry in Australia, and it's a privilege to be given an opportunity to shape its direction and future.”

Under his leadership, the AACTA Awards relocated to the Gold Coast, Australia in 2024, hosted by Rebel Wilson, and continued in 2025 with Russell Crowe, AACTA President since 2020, as host. Christian's "Cannes on the Coast" vision sought to establish the Gold Coast as an international screen hub, bringing together the awards and a wider festival programme to put Australian film and television in the global spotlight. Christian also spearheaded the expansion of the AACTA Festival, a public event launched in 2024 alongside the awards. By 2025, the five-day festival at the Home of the Arts (HOTA) recorded 22,000 registrations across more than 100 events, including premiere screenings, industry panels, workshops, and masterclasses featuring filmmakers such as Leigh Whannell, Adam Elliot, Greig Fraser and Michael Gracey. The awards have attracted prominent international stars, including Henry Cavill, Margot Robbie, Chris Hemsworth, Cate Blanchett, Guy Pearce, and Ron Howard. Christian described the festival as "a vital platform for fostering new talent" and industry collaboration, and emphasised "building audiences for Australian screen content" as a continuing priority.

In October 2026, Christian concluded his tenure on the Australian Film Institute board after six years and three terms, including three years as chair. He said, "It's been a privilege to help strengthen the organisation, build major partnerships and create a broader platform for Australian screen talent, both at home and internationally."
