= Bella Alexandras =

Actress, singer-songwriter, and model (born 2010)

- Alexandras at the Monte-Carlo Television Festival in 2025
- Born: Isabella Alexandras; 19 July 2010 (age 16)
- Occupations: Actress; singer-songwriter; model
- Years active: 2016–present
- Notable work: The Infernal Machine (2022); Māsas (Sisters, 2022)

Bella Alexandras (born Isabella Alexandras; 19 July 2010) is an actress, singer-songwriter, and model. She made her feature film debut as Samantha Higgins in the Paramount Pictures psychological thriller The Infernal Machine (2022) alongside Guy Pearce and Alice Eve, and appeared as Joy in Linda Olte's drama film Māsas (Sisters, 2022).

== Early life and modeling ==
Alexandras in 2025

Alexandras was born on 19 July 2010 to parents Nerissa and Christian. She developed an early interest in performing arts after attending a stage production of Annie.

At age nine, Alexandras began working as a child fashion model after being invited to London Fashion Week, where she was scouted by stylist Eugen Chakhnovitch. At age ten, she walked at Paris Fashion Week and was featured in YOU / News24 and Vogue. She subsequently modeled in international campaigns and runway shows for DKNY, Karl Lagerfeld, and Sonia Rykiel, and designed a capsule collection titled "Bonton by Bella" for the Parisian fashion label Bonton.

== Career ==
=== Acting ===
While in Los Angeles at age eight, Alexandras was signed by talent manager and producer Steve Owens, who helped her transition from fashion modeling into film acting. She trained with casting director Lisa London and later signed with Media Artists Group and Miles Anthony Associates.

In 2022, Alexandras made her feature film debut as Samantha Higgins in writer-director Andrew Hunt's psychological thriller The Infernal Machine, distributed by Paramount Pictures and starring Guy Pearce, Alice Eve, Jeremy Davies, and Alex Pettyfer. The same year, she appeared as Joy in the Latvian–Italian family drama Māsas (Sisters), written and directed by Linda Olte, which premiered at the Warsaw Film Festival.

In May and June 2025, she attended the 2025 Cannes Film Festival and the Monte-Carlo Television Festival.

=== Music ===
Alexandras in a recording studio in 2025

Alongside her screen acting, Alexandras is a singer-songwriter.

== Filmography ==
Year	Title	Role	Notes	Ref.
2022	The Infernal Machine	Samantha Higgins	Feature film debut (Paramount Pictures)	
2022	Māsas (Sisters)	Joy	Feature film (dir. Linda Olte)	
