= List of Bob the Builder (2015 TV series) episodes =

This is an episode list of the 2015 Bob the Builder series, originally broadcast on Channel 5 in the UK. During the course of the series, 130 episodes aired over three series from 1 September 2015 to 30 December 2018.

== Series overview ==
Series	Episodes	Originally released		
Series	Episodes	First released	Last released	Network
1	52	1 September 2015	29 February 2016	UK: Channel 5 US: PBS Kids
2	52	27 June 2016	7 September 2017	UK: Channel 5 US: PBS Kids
3	26	2 January 2018	30 December 2018	UK: Channel 5

== Episodes ==
=== Series 1 (2015–16) ===
No. overall	No. in series	Title	Written by	Original release date
1	1	"Sky High Scoop"	Laura Beaumont and Paul Larson	1 September 2015
When Bob and his team are fitting a lift into a Spring City skyscraper, Scoop decides he wants to see all of Spring City. He decides he will get on Tiny's lift and go up. But before he gets to the top he falls off the lift and is balancing on sections and Bob must save him.
2	2	"Milkshake Mixup"	Laura Beaumont and Paul Larson	2 September 2015
As Bob and his team finish building a fun new Milkshake Bar, Scoop sees Chef Tattie experimenting with ingredients and gets inspired to make his own concrete mix creation.
3	3	"Kitchen Whizz"	Tim Bain	3 September 2015
When Bob and his team are helping Chef Tattie open up his new UFO-themed revolving restaurant, the machines go in search of aliens while Pilchard takes Bob for a spin.
4	4	"Lofty Lets Loose"	Laura Beaumont and Paul Larson	4 September 2015
Bob and his team are building a new giraffe enclosure at the zoo, but Lofty's excitement about meeting his favourite animal gets the better of him.
5	5	"Scoop's Big Break"	Ali Crockatt and David Scott	7 September 2015
Bob and his team are working on a new driveway at Fixham Town Hall when Scoop's enthusiasm for breaking up the old one gets the better of him.
6	6	"Bob the Brave"	Tim Bain	8 September 2015
When Mayor Madison calls Bob and his team to do repairs at Fixham Castle, Leo gets trapped inside and starts to hear strange noises.
7	7	"Saffi's Treehouse"	Miranda Larson	9 September 2015
When Saffi asks her hero Wendy to build her a treehouse, Bob has to step in as things start to literally fall apart.
8	8	"Cats and Dogs"	Miranda Larson	10 September 2015
When Bob takes Pilchard for her checkup at the vets, he discovers that cats and dogs do not always get along when he builds the separate rooms for them.
9	9	"Workshop Makeover"	Ali Crockatt and David Scott	11 September 2015
Bob and his team plan a surprise at the garage for Curtis' birthday, but when Scoop decides to try to be a mechanic things go through the roof.
10	10	"Muck on Ice"	Douglas Wood	14 September 2015
As Bob and his team are building an ice rink, Muck decides that he would like to try it out for himself.
11	11	"Bentley's Bones"	Lee Pressman	15 September 2015
Mr. Bentley gets his measurements wrong at the Natural History Museum, leaving Bob's team with a dinosaur dilemma.
12	12	"Bear Mountain"	Darren Jones	16 September 2015
Bob and his team are building a new bear enclosure at the zoo, but Scoop has his own design ideas which causes trouble.
13	13	"Fitness Frenzy"	Tim Bain	17 September 2015
When Bob and his team build a fitness trail for the Spring City fun run, Scoop organises his own competition - the Muscle Machine games!
14	14	"Ballroom Blitz"	Helen Farrall	18 September 2015
When the dance show Ballroom Blitz comes to Spring City, Lofty dreams of taking to the dance floor.
15	15	"Rockets Under the Stars"	Miranda Larson	21 September 2015
Bob and his team build an outdoor TV area at the sports stadium so that the Spring City Rockets can watch their teammate Mila in the children's game show Whiz-A-Quiz. Lofty gets distracted while helping the Rockets to decorate the stadium, leaving Leo to take on a big job by himself.
16	16	"Winter in Spring"	Tim Bain	22 September 2015
When Bob and his team build a ski lift on Observatory Hill, Scoop takes to the slopes but got more than he bargain for.
17	17	"Pick up a Penguin"	Lee Pressman	23 September 2015
Bob and his team build a penguin pool at the zoo, but when the penguins arrive before it is ready, Leo looks after them at the town hall's new pond and water feature. Meanwhile, Mayor Madison and Mr. Bentley are trying to impress the grouchy Mayor Snipe from Riverdale.
18	18	"Home on the Range"	Sophie Hetherington	24 September 2015
When Bob and his team build stables at the racetrack, Leo's dreams of becoming a cowboy leave the horses homeless for the night.
19	19	"Pass the Parcel"	Ali Crockatt and David Scott	24 December 2015
Bob and his team are installing a robotic picking system for a warehouse before Christmas, but things start to go awry when Leo jumbles everything up.
20	20	"Dig This"	Sophie Hetherington	25 September 2015
Team Bob are digging the foundations for a skyscraper in Spring City's new business zone, but work has to stop when Scoop come across some ancient Roman ruins.
21	21	"Dino Park"	Darren Jones	9 November 2015
Bob and his team set to work on a new Dinosaur Park attraction, but things take a turn for the worse when Mucks fear of dinosaurs causes a big problem.
22	22	"Marathon Span"	David Scott and Ali Crockatt	10 November 2015
The team is asked to build a bridge over the River Coil in time for the Spring City Quarter Marathon, but Scoop's fear of fish leaves Lofty in danger.
23	23	"End of the Line"	Miranda Larson	11 November 2015
When Bob and the team build a monorail system for Spring City, but when Leo is left in charge, chaos ensues when he doesn't concentrate on one job at a time.
24	24	"Lights! Camera! Leo!"	Ali Crockatt and David Scott	12 November 2015
Bob and the team are building the set for a new science fiction movie - but Leo would rather be in front of the camera.
25	25	"Star Struck Muck"	Miranda Larson	13 November 2015
The team are asked to build a movie set for Dash Lightning's new film, but Muck's mission to meet the star causes trouble.
26	26	"Here Be Dragons"	Helen Farrall	16 November 2015
The zookeeper commissions Bob and the team to build an enclosure for her Komodo dragons, but Muck's dislike of the lizards accidentally lands Leo in trouble.
27	27	"Check Up Day"	Simon Davies	17 November 2015
Curtis carries out a routine machine assessment, while Scoop wants to do well, but a sudden realisation causes him to worry that he may not attain top marks.
28	28	"Boogie Woogie Wonderland"	Helen Farrall	18 November 2015
Bob and the team are asked to build a giant games testing area, but Leo and Scoop fail to follow instructions building the keyboard.
29	29	"Scoop's Pet Shark"	Tim Bain	19 November 2015
Bob and the team are building a new aquarium for a baby tiger shark, but Scoop decides to treat the creature as his new pet, but lures the shark and Muck into trouble.
30	30	"Car Wash"	Simon Davies	20 November 2015
Bob and the team build an automatic car wash, but Roley's need for perfection could stop them from getting it working in time.
31	31	"Out of the Woods"	Helen Farrall	23 November 2015
Dizzy wants to go camping with the Spring City Rockets but her fear of creatures soon gets the better of her.
32	32	"Never Give Up"	Darren Jones	24 November 2015
Bob and the team are building a zipline, but Scoop and Lofty become concerned when Leo is upset which affects his work. Scoop and Lofty try to help Leo out but it causes the zipline to come down.
33	33	"Smallest Rocket"	Darren Jones	25 November 2015
A rocket launch is due to take place in Spring City, but Lofty's excitement for the rocket creates disaster.
34	34	"Scoop and the Slide"	Miranda Larson	26 November 2015
Scoop is excited about the construction of a new water slide, so much that he didn't dig the trench deep enough for the supports.
35	35	"Spring City Wheel"	Simon Davies	27 November 2015
Muck and Leo stay up late, leaving them feeling too tired to do their work building the Ferris wheel.
36	36	"Star Attraction"	Lee Pressman	30 November 2015
Everyone wonders who will be put on the first Spring City Hero star. Scoop wishes he was the star but when he tries to show off his skills, he only makes it worse.
37	37	"Stranded"	Darren Jones	1 December 2015
The weather causes trouble for the team whilst they are working on the Spring City lighthouse.
38	38	"Tattie's Mash Up"	Helen Farrall	2 December 2015
When Chef Tattie asks Leo to be a DJ at his new café, he gets distracted from his work.
39	39	"Spring City TV"	Ali Crockatt and David Scott	3 December 2015
Leo gets distracted by a game on his phone, causing trouble for the team installing the satellite dish.
40	40	"Wind and Shine"	Darren Jones	4 December 2015
The team are building new wind turbines, and Scoop has some ideas of his own about thinking ahead, but got more than he bargained for.
41	41	"The Spring City Clock"	Simon Davies	15 February 2016
The team are building a new clock designed by the Spring City Rockets, but Leo and Muck accidentally put their plans at risk.
42	42	"Muck and the Elephant"	Miranda Larson	16 February 2016
Muck is tasked with collecting a new elephant statue but damages it and he is too afraid to own up which causes trouble.
43	43	"Bob and the Masked Biker"	Helen Farrall	17 February 2016
Bob prepares to enter a motorbike race on the beach with a mysterious biker, Meanwhile, Scoop and Muck try out the beach race but they are too heavy to jump off sand ramps.
44	44	"Dizzy's Pirates"	Tim Bain	18 February 2016
Dizzy tries to take charge of Mr. Bentley's newest play but got mixed up with cement and costumes.
45	45	"City Beach"	Sophie Hetherington	19 February 2016
The team are building the new makeshift beach and Muck struggles to keep the beach tidy.
46	46	"The Silver Shield"	Simon Davies	22 February 2016
Scoop tries to look for buried treasure but digs where he shouldn't.
47	47	"Scoop Cries Wolf"	Ali Crockatt and David Scott	23 February 2016
Scoop gets bored during his day off.
48	48	"Battle of the Boards"	Tim Bain	24 February 2016
Leo tries to show he is an expert skateboarder but chaos ensues.
49	49	"Stormy Weather"	Helen Farrall	25 February 2016
A storm threatens a sandcastle building competition and the search for Mayor Madison's ring on the beach.
50	50	"The Big Bang"	Darren Jones	26 February 2016
Scoop scares Lofty during work on a demolition site.
51	51	"A Present for Bob"	Miranda Larson	25 December 2015
Lofty decides to get Bob a Christmas present, but forgets where he left it which causes trouble.
52	52	"Fly Away Ghost"	Miranda Larson	29 February 2016
The Halloween festival leaves Lofty feeling scared.

=== Series 2 (2016–17) ===
No. overall	No. in series	Title	Written by	Original release date
53	1	"Pyramid Puzzle"	Darren Jones	27 June 2016
Lofty shows off his new claw while the team is working on a new pyramid for an exhibition.
54	2	"Phillip's Sleepover"	Ali Crockatt and David Scott	28 June 2016
Work on building Phillip's new garage is delayed, meaning that he has to spend the night at the yard with Bob and his team.
55	3	"Haunted Town Hall"	Helen Farrall	29 June 2016
The new alarm system at the Town Hall keeps going off, leading to Mr. Bentley believing that it is haunted.
56	4	"Flotsam and Jetsam"	Darren Jones	30 June 2016
Bob and his team are clearing the beach, but Lofty gets carried away with ideas on how to use the washed-up driftwood.
57	5	"Drive Thru Disaster"	Miranda Larson	1 July 2016
Leo is filming the team building a new drive-thru at Chef Tattie's milkshake bar for a college project, and Scoop wants to be the star.
58	6	"Where's Pilchard?"	Darren Jones	4 July 2016
When Pilchard disappears after Muck tells her to shoo, he, Leo, and the machines try to find her again before Bob finds out.
59	7	"Bob's Band"	Lee Pressman	5 July 2016
Bob is practicing for a concert with his band, when Roley accidentally squashes their instruments.
60	8	"Wild Wild Wedding"	Tim Bain	6 July 2016
Scoop is given the job of best machine during the preparations for Henry and Tilly's wedding, but he lets the title go to his head.
61	9	"Jumping Muck"	Darren Jones	7 July 2016
Muck wants to be able to jump like a horse, with chaotic results.
62	10	"Muck Mucks About"	Ali Crockatt and David Scott	8 July 2016
Muck tries to prank Scoop, but accidentally frightens the elephant at Fixham Zoo, putting himself in danger.
63	11	"Phillip's Important Job"	Helen Farrall	11 July 2016
Phillip has to take Mayor Madison to a book signing event, but leaves before his service has finished.
64	12	"Moving House"	Lee Pressman	19 September 2016
Bob and the team take the moving house the other route as Mr. Bentley says the bird's nest is almost blocking their main route.
65	13	"Wendy's Surprise"	Miranda Larson	20 September 2016
Trying to get Wendy to finish work proves difficult as Bob, Lofty and the team plan a surprise party for her.
66	14	"Ice Cold Fixham"	Lee Pressman	21 September 2016
Mayor Madison is having a Party and Wendy has sculpted a Polar Bear out of Ice for the occasion, but Scoop grows attached to the masterpiece.
67	15	"Super Scoop"	Tim Bain	21 September 2016
Scoop wants to be a superhero, like Dash Lightning, but his attempts at heroism lead to chaos for the team, who are building an Outdoor Cinema.
68	16	"Dizzy and the Butterfly"	Helen Farrall	22 September 2016
Bob is asked to build a butterfly house at the zoo.
69	17	"Dino Coaster"	Tim Bain	23 September 2016
The team build a roller coaster at the Dino Park.
70	18	"Crane Pain"	Ali Crockatt and David Scott	26 September 2016
Lofty tries to lift materials that are too heavy for him!
71	19	"A Message from Space"	Darren Jones	27 September 2016
Lofty is put in charge of protecting Mei's new telescope.
72	20	"Bob's Badges"	Miranda Larson	28 September 2016
Muck is determined to get reward stars for working well.
73	21	"Apples Everywhere"	Darren Jones	29 September 2016
Bob and the team rebuild the barn but Flame the horse causes chaos in the orchard, Muck tries to stop him but it only makes it worse.
74	22	"Muck the Safety Officer"	Ali Crockatt and David Scott	30 September 2016
Muck is safety officer when the team repair a sink hole.
75	23	"Best Laid Plans"	Lee Pressman	6 March 2017
Bob accidentally gives Leo and Mr. Bentley the wrong plans.
76	24	"Bob's Big Surprise"	James Mason	7 March 2017
Scoop hides a large box, thinking it is a present for Bob.
77	25	"A Safe Place for Dizzy"	Ali Crockatt and David Scott	8 March 2017
Dizzy is so busy she didn't remember to tell Bob the code of the safe that Two-Tone told her. Meanwhile, Leo leaves but forgets to close objects, Leo promises to keep objects closed when finished with them, but unexpectedly locks Dizzy in the safe. How will she get out?
78	26	"Pilchard and the Bear"	Helen Farrall	9 March 2017
There's trouble when Scoop takes Pilchard to work.
79	27	"In Too Deep"	Darren Jones	10 March 2017
When Scoop tries to keep up with Stretch, he gets stuck.
80	28	"The Dash Lighting Experience"	Darren Jones	17 March 2017
Muck causes deliveries to go to the wrong places.
81	29	"TV or Not TV"	Ali Crockatt and David Scott	24 March 2017
Lofty's attempts to evade attention end up causing damage when lifting the horse shoe entrance, Meanwhile, Scoop wants to be on camera.
82	30	"Captain Bentley"	Tim Bain	31 March 2017
Bob restores a historic ship.
83	31	"Machine Magic"	Tim Bain	7 April 2017
Scoop is inspired to try his skills as an amateur magician.
84	32	"Bucket Stand"	Laura Beaumont and Paul Larson	14 April 2017
Bob build an exercise trail to show how people are strong and Scoop is trying to do a Bucket Stand.
85	33	"Camping Calamity"	Miranda Larson	21 April 2017
Scoop decides to go camping but gets lost in the woods with Muck.
86	34	"Dino Scare"	Miranda Larson	25 April 2017
Scoop gets into a spot of bother at a dinosaur-bone yard.
87	35	"Bricks and Mortar"	Helen Farrell	28 April 2017
Bob comes to the rescue when Leo gets a bricklaying job wrong. Meanwhile, Muck wishes he can get a certificate for cleaning up the yard.
88	36	"Scoop's Scoops"	Laura Beaumont and Paul Larson	7 July 2017
A thunderstorm blows the power in Chef Tattie's restaurant. Bob and the team set to work cleaning up the mess but Scoop and Leo quit cleaning and start selling ice creams.
89	37	"Hoist Away"	Darren Jones	28 May 2017
Bob is building a boat repair workshop for Curtis but Leo and Scoop mixed up the wires on the crane causes trouble.
90	38	"Pop Up Shops"	Tim Bain	4 June 2017
Bob is building pop-up shops out of shipping containers but Scoop's imagination of the shop designs get the better of him.
91	39	"Yard Muddle"	Darren Jones	11 June 2017
The team tidies up the yard but Shifter's speed causes Scoop and Muck to be trapped in the sheds.
92	40	"Roley's Speech"	Ali Crockatt and David Scott	18 June 2017
Roley has promised to give a speech.
93	41	"Muck the Chauffeur"	Laura Beaumont and Paul Larson	25 June 2017
Muck tries to help Mr. Bentley by being his chauffeur but mixes up the food stall deliveries.
94	42	"Scoop Dashes for Glory"	Ross Hastings	1 July 2017
The team are building a treetop walkway at the sports park.
95	43	"Ship Shape"	Ross Hastings	8 July 2017
A historical ship needs fixing but Scoop has the crow's nest.
96	44	"Too Many Cooks"	Ali Crockatt and David Scott	15 July 2017
The team help Chef Tattie prepare for a food festival but Tread makes the wrong deliveries.
97	45	"Training Day"	James Mason	22 July 2017
Training day skills come in useful when Shifter gets stuck.
98	46	"Muck's Stinky Trip"	Laura Beaumont and Paul Larson	29 July 2017
Muck is tasked with collecting some smelly manure.
99	47	"Playing Ketchup"	Ali Crockatt and David Scott	3 August 2017
Bob and Wendy are building two burger stands at the stadium but Scoop thinks he and Bob would win against Wendy and Muck.
100	48	"Shifter's New Garage"	James Mason	10 August 2017
Shifter wrongly thinks one of the new garages is for him and Dizzy tries to help.
101	49	"Snow Fall"	James Mason	17 August 2017
Tread is trapped by snow! Scoop and Stretch to the rescue.
102	50	"Danger House"	James Mason and Steve Cannon	24 August 2017
Leo fixes a film set, unaware it is designed to fall down.
103	51	"Muck the Elf"	Tim Bain	31 August 2017
Muck takes on the role of a busy Christmas elf at the plaza.
104	52	"A Christmas Fix"	Darren Jones	7 September 2017
Bob and the team set up Fixham's big Christmas party, but Mr. Bentley's excitement of the display gets the better of him.

=== Series 3 (2018) ===
This is the first season not aired for PBS Kids.

No. overall	No. in series	Title	Written by	Original release date
105	1	"The A-mazing Maze"	Steven Darancette	2 January 2018
When Scoop, Muck and Lofty get lost in a maze they have helped build in the grounds of Fixham Castle, Leo uses a drone to help guide them out.
106	2	"Grand Marshal Bob"	Corey Powell	3 January 2018
When Mayor Madison announces that Bob will be the Grand Marshal of the annual town parade, Scoop, Muck and Lofty compete to create the best float for him.
107	3	"Fess Up or Mess Up"	Grant Moran	4 January 2018
When Muck secretly takes Leo's newly built robo-racing vehicle with him on a build, the toy goes haywire and he tries to solve the problem on his own.
108	4	"Bob's First Build"	Steven Darancette	5 January 2018
When Muck feels bad for collapsing Bob's first build - his old shed, Scoop tells him the story of how the young Bob built it and all the mistakes he made along the way.
109	5	"Grid Block"	Mark Zaslove	8 January 2018
Dizzy tries to be like the town's new traffic lights, but directing the team instead of cars - and causes the biggest traffic jam in Spring City history!
110	6	"Bobcat Bridge"	Douglas Wood	9 January 2018
Scoop meets a bobcat cub, who has become separated from his family by a busy road. Bob and the team build a wildlife corridor so that animals can cross safely, but they have to build it again when Scoop is too impatient to wait for the cement to dry.
111	7	"Speedway Scoop"	Miranda Larson	10 January 2018
Bob and the team are working on a new spiral ramp to make the drive to a bird-watchers' park more direct. Eager to become a champion race car, Scoop tries it out before it is completed, creating chaos and delaying its completion.
112	8	"Parrot Talk"	Darren Jones	11 January 2018
The team are building an aviary at the zoo when Scoop hears one of the birds asking Bob to open the cage. He doesn't realise that parrots are just mimics, with the result that he releases the whole flock. Can Bob figure out a way to lure them all back inside?
113	9	"Lofty's Playground Problem"	David Scott and Ali Crockatt	12 January 2018
Bob and the team are adding a wing to the Spring City elementary school, which means that the playground has to be downsized. Saffi asks Lofty to save the elephant ride, but he doesn't tell Bob and causes trouble when he hides it on the roof.
114	10	"Dog Disaster"	Andrew Emerson	15 January 2018
While Bob is away tracking down Cooper, a runaway dog, Lofty and Leo's over competitiveness leads to them accidentally destroying the obstacle training course for rescue dogs they are meant to be building.
115	11	"Can't Runaway Runway"	Mark Zaslove	16 January 2018
Lofty is so excited that Leo is returning from his holiday that he steps onto the newly laid runway at the airport and gets stuck in the cement, just as the plane is ready to land.
116	12	"Scoop's Big Oops"	Grant Moran	17 January 2018
While building a wind farm, Scoop becomes jealous when Ace pays more attention to newbie Shifter, who keeps making mistakes. He decides to make mistakes too, with disastrous results.
117	13	"Floating Away"	Mark Zaslove	18 January 2018
After staying up late watching Ace movies, Muck falls asleep and ends up on a part of a floating bridge that the team are building across the river, and it is heading straight for the falls!
118	14	"Jet Powered Scoop"	Darren Jones	19 January 2018
Scoop finds himself zooming around the streets on a jet engine, after he messes around at the scientific test facility that the team are building for Mei Moon.
119	15	"A Heavy Load"	Helen Farrall	22 January 2018
Two-Tonne's desperation to help a pregnant elephant leads him to make a decision that causes a bridge to collapse, and the elephant to escape!
120	16	"Canal Chaos"	Miranda Larson	23 January 2018
When Lofty is too embarrassed to admit that he doesn't understand Bob's instructions for the new Spring City canal build, he puts the gate in the wrong way.
121	17	"Barn Building Bedlam"	Miranda Larson	24 January 2018
Scoop and Ace are put in charge of decorating two barns for Farmer Pickles. Ace's is very impressive, but Scoop will stop at nothing until his barn is the best...
122	18	"Aqua Ducks"	Mark Zaslove	25 January 2018
While Bob and the team are building an aqueduct between Spring City and Fixham, some ducklings mistake Muck for their real mother. When their nest is endangered by the aqueduct, Muck tries to find a way to save the nest and ducklings and get the ducklings back to their real mother.
123	19	"Talking Loud and Clear"	Mark Zaslove	26 January 2018
Lofty is working on a build with newcomer Cherry, whom he wants to impress. Acting on Two-Tonne's advice, he changes his behavior, but his plans are ruined when Leo's mischievous bot Whizzer shows up.
124	20	"Tunnel Trouble"	Mark Zaslove	19 March 2018
Scoop tries to show up Norm, the new mega-machine driller, but causes a cave-in on a tunnel build, trapping himself and Muck underground. Can they get out before the skyscraper above collapses on them?
125	21	"Bob's Detective Squad"	Miranda Larson	20 March 2018
Rocky and Leo help a famous author whose new book has gone missing.
126	22	"Ace's Dynamite Movie"	Douglas Wood	21 March 2018
Ace's ego causes big problems during the demolition and rebuild of Roland's grocery store, and a film director catches it all on film.
127	23	"Bridge Over Trouble"	Tony Cooke	22 March 2018
Scoop is eager to prove he is not the messiest machine on the team, only to ruin a demolition job. But everyone soon learns that old things can often be used again.
128	24	"What's Opera, Muck?"	Mark Zaslove	23 March 2018
Wendy makes plans to stage an opera with vehicles and people, but Muck's loud singing destroys the ceiling of the opera house.
129	25	"Snowman Scare"	Mark Zaslove	1 December 2018
Rocky's imagination gets the better of him when he takes Two-Tonne's story seriously and thinks an Abominable Snowman is around Spring City while repairing an attic. When things got cleared up on the snowman part, it was revealed that the roof collapsed because Mr. Bentley removed the rafters to make room for his file cabinets.
130	26	"New Year's Spectacular"	Peter Hunziker	30 December 2018
While building a river stage for a New Year's Eve fireworks extravaganza, Scoop's over-anxious anticipation of the show nearly blows it up.

=== Special (2017) ===
No.	Title	Written by	Original release date
Special	"Mega Machines"	Chris Parker	27 May 2017
Scoop, Muck and Lofty cannot wait to help Bob with his biggest build ever – building a dam and transforming an old quarry into a reservoir to provide Spring City with fresh water. Bob enlists the help of another builder, Conrad, to help clear the quarry – along with his three enormous Mega Machines, Ace, Thud and Crunch. Conrad, secretly resentful that he lost out on the dam-building contract to Bob, plots to undermine his rival's reputation and sabotages the dam. Soon Bob realizes that things are not as they should be... and that it is up to him and his team to save Spring City! Conrad wants Bob to look bad...
