= Marcus Fraser =

Marcus Fraser may refer to:

- Marcus Fraser (golfer) (born 1978), Australian golfer
- Marcus Fraser (footballer) (born 1994), Scottish footballer
- Marcus Fraser (actor), British actor
