= Get Ace =

Australian television series

- The show's title card featuring lead protagonists Ace McDougal and Hugo
- Genre: Comedy; Slapstick; Science fantasy
- Created by: D.J. McPherson; Jack Christian
- Written by: D.J. McPherson; Ray Boseley; Philip Dalkin; Tim Bain
- Directed by: D.J. McPherson; Jack Christian
- Voices of: David Myles Brown; Lyall Brooks; Amanda Harrison; Emily Wheaton; Ian Bliss; Tara Whyte; Jeffrey Richards
- Composer: Russell Thornton
- Country of origin: Australia
- Original language: English
- No. of seasons: 1
- No. of episodes: 52

Production
- Executive producers: D.J. McPherson; Jack Christian; Cherrie Bottger
- Producers: D.J. McPherson; Jack Christian
- Editor: Jeffery Richards
- Running time: 12 minutes
- Production companies: Galaxy Pop; Filmology Finance

Original release
- Network: Eleven
- Release: 19 January – 13 July 2014

Get Ace is an Australian animated television series that follows the adventures of Ace McDougal, a young boy with amazing hi-tech super powered dental braces. The series officially premiered on Eleven, on 19 January 2014, where it took first place in rating amongst animated programs.

== Overview ==
A case of mistaken identity causes ordinary high school student, Ace McDougal, to be thrown into the fast-paced world of hi-tech super spies. During a normal trip to the dentist's office, Ace is accidentally fitted out with a set of hi-tech, super spy braces, loaded with dozens of different gadgets and a holographic artificial intelligence program named Hugo, that only he can see. Against the odds, Ace and Hugo (Holographic User Guidance Operative) must learn to get along in order to keep the braces secret and safe. The braces original owner Ned Krinkle, an evil spy and master of disguise, will do anything to get them back.

Since then Ned and his equally evil mother Hilda, have been trying to kidnap Ace and reclaim the braces for themselves. Ace spends his days trying to live a normal life, while constantly on the lookout for Ned and Hilda's next insane scheme to steal the braces from right out of his mouth! Episodes usually revolve around Ace using the braces to make his life easier and having it backfire on him, as well as Ned and Hilda's increasingly complicated schemes to capture Ace.

== Characters ==
- Ace McDougal (voiced by David Myles Brown) Ace is a nerdy 13-year-old, with a somewhat unfounded amount of confidence. Ace embraces chaos and confusion with unshakeable optimism and gusto. Always needing to stand out, Ace is quick to act and slow to think, often getting himself in trouble before Ned and Hilda even act.
- Hugo (voiced by Lyall Brooks) H.U.G.O, or Holographic User Guidance Operative, is the stuffy computer generated hologram that operates Ace's braces. Hugo's image is in the form of a younger Ned, but while Ned is a dim-witted buffoon, Hugo is quick-witted super intelligent genius. Hugo has been programmed with a very distinct human personality: He's fussy, superior with sophisticated tastes and a sharp sarcastic wit, making him and Ace an awkward team.
- Ned Krinkle (voiced by Lyall Brooks) Ned is an evil spy and master of disguise. He is able to perfectly imitate absolutely anyone's looks and voice. The only way to identify Ned is by his tell-tale jagged teeth, the one part of his looks he can never seem to change, and which Ace must always be on the look-out for. Ned is childish and cowardly, often throwing tantrums or sobbing when things don't go his way.
- Hilda Krinkle (voiced by Amanda Harrison) Hilda is a brilliant villain with decades of experience as a spy. Although she may have peaked during the Cold War, she's still fit, athletic and nimble as a ninja. Hilda is blindly devoted to her son Ned, often babying him as if he were a small child. She is very much the brains of the operation, and although she is willing to do anything to get the braces for her son, she will more often than not put Ned in dangerous situations to do it.

== Episodes ==
No.	Title	Written by	Original release date
1	"Ace Gets Braced"	Ray Boseley	19 January 2014
When average school kid Ace McDougal gets fitted with braces, a mix-up at the dentist sees him catapulted into a world of supervillains and hair-raising adventures.
2	"Monkey Madness"	Chris Anastassiades	19 January 2014
Wildlife expert Safari Bob gives a presentation at Ace's school. But a mishap with the Enlargerator Ray sees Ace transform a cute little monkey into a giant rampaging beast.
3	"Colossal Fossil"	Brendan Luno	26 January 2014
Ace uses his braces Cohesive Manipulation Ray to bring a T-Rex skeleton back to life and take on Ned and Hilda in a battle of colossal proportions!
4	"Lunchbox Gets Braced"	Philip Dalkin	26 January 2014
While trying to remove a loose tooth, Ace accidentally loses his braces only to have them wind up on his loveable oafish dog, Lunchbox. Ace has to catch up to his super-powered dog, before Ned and Hilda can get their hands on him.
5	"Lord of the Board"	Philip Dalkin	2 February 2014
When pro-skater Toby Squawk announces a local skateboard competition, Ace uses his braces to cheat and discovers he's skateboarded straight into Ned and Hilda's trap.
6	"Grandpa Brouhaha"	Paul Western-Pittard	2 February 2014
When Ace babysits his Grandpa, the forgetful old-timer goes from annoying to awesome when he unwittingly rescues Ace from Ned and Hilda's clutches!
7	"Chicken Benefit"	D.J. McPherson & Ray Boseley	9 February 2014
Ace's dad Dougal plans to perform his embarrassing chicken act at Ace's school's benefit concert and Ace must find a way to keep his Dad off stage or face school-wide humiliation.
8	"Chicken Magic"	D.J. McPherson & Ray Boseley	9 February 2014
When Ace ignores Hugo's advice and agrees to be sawn in half as part of Tina's magic act, he learns that sometimes… just sometimes, Hugo is right!
9	"Hullaballoon"	Paul Western-Pittard	16 February 2014
Ace finally scores a date with Tina and takes her on a hot air balloon ride but when Ned and Hilda get involved, his dream date soon goes from heavenly to hair-raising.
10	"Trash and Terror"	Philip Dalkin	16 February 2014
It's work experience day and Ace gets stuck working at the garbage dump but when Ned and Hilda pounce, Ace learns that local garboloists Vigo and Rigo have a few tricks of their own.
11	"Countdown to Kabloowie"	Cameron Clarke	23 February 2014
When Hugo's boredom reaches an all-time peak, the braces self-destruct sequence is activated and Ace has one day to make Hugo happy or the braces will detonate!
12	"Jack Union"	Tim Bain	23 February 2014
After Ned and Hilda kidnap Ace's Grandpa, Ace must team up with his Grandpa's roommate super-spy extraordinaire Jack Union to save the day.
13	"Save the Crystal Cat"	D.J. McPherson & Robert Greenberg	2 March 2014
When Ace accidentally breaks his mother's beloved crystal cat statue, he realizes that there is only one place he can find a replacement – Creepville Mansion.
14	"Fast Times at Funpark High"	Paul Western-Pittard	2 March 2014
With the Mayor visiting Funpark High, Ace needs to be on his best behavior but a mysterious figure is doing everything he can to land Ace in detention.
15	"Ghostship"	Tim Bain	9 March 2014
Principal Duffy takes the kids on an excursion to an authentic Viking Ship but it quickly spirals into mutiny and madness when Becky seizes control of the ship.
16	"Mr X"	Philip Dalkin	9 March 2014
Convinced she finally has proof that Ace is an alien, Becky plans to expose her brother to the world at Funpark High's Science Fair. She recruits world-famous alien hunter Mr. X to help her catch him, but Mr. X has is even more mysterious than Becky knows.
17	"Humungous Man"	Philip Dalkin	16 March 2014
Ace sneaks his favorite Humungous Man action figurine along to a wilderness survival camp unaware that Ned and Hilda have programmed it to steal his braces.
18	"Dog Gone"	Brendan Luno	16 March 2014
When Lunchbox loses all his fur in an unfortunate beauty salon accident, the unrecognizable dog is adopted by Mr. Rainer and turned into a teeth-gnashing guard dog.
19	"Be My Freaky Valentine"	D.J. McPherson & Cameron Clarke	23 March 2014
In an attempt to make Tina jealous, Ace gets Hugo to create a holographic girlfriend to bring to the valentines day dance. His plan backfires when the lovesick hologram becomes more than a little possessive.
20	"Comeback Mr Walker"	Anthony Watt	23 March 2014
When Ace's teacher Mr. Walker quits to reignite his rockstar career, super strict Mr. Rainer takes over and Ace and Gordon team up to get their favorite teacher back.
21	"Computer Games"	Paul Western-Pittard	30 March 2014
Ned and Hilda turn Ace's favorite video game against him by bringing all its characters and monsters to life, but all Hugo cares about is meeting his celebrity crush, video game starlet Tara Tuff.
22	"Creepville Dare"	D.J. McPherson & Brendan Luno	30 March 2014
When Becky tests her latest alien probe on Ace, Hugo splits into two, Nerdy Hugo and Cool Hugo. Now Ace must find a way to put his pal back together before Cool Hugo does away with Nerdy Hugo forever.
23	"Greener Tina"	D.J. McPherson & Brendan Luno	6 April 2014
A mysterious new girl arrives at Funpark High and is everything Ace has ever dreamed of but is she too good to be true?
24	"Athol and Ace"	Philip Dalkin	6 April 2014
It's Hilda's birthday and Ned comes up with a diabolic plan to get his precious Mumsey the only present she really wants – Ace's braces.
25	"Exchange Ace"	Ray Boseley	13 April 2014
It's the annual Humungous Man Trivia competition and Ace has some serious competition in Anoop, a geeky exchange student who also has his eye on the Humungously awesome prize.
26	"Follow that Collar"	Tim Bain	13 April 2014
After accidentally destroying Mr. Rainer's savage robotic guard dog, Ace is on a madcap chase all over town to catch the one piece of evidence that could bust him... the dog's video collar. But Ace isn't the only one chasing it.
27	"Control Freak"	Philip Dalkin	20 April 2014
When Ned and Hilda trick Ace into brushing with a nanobot-infused toothpaste, they gain total control over the braces and it's up to Hugo to defeat the uninvited mouth invader.
28	"Fast Food and the Furious"	Tim Bain	20 April 2014
Ace signs up to work at Burpy's Burgers charity day, planning to use his braces to help win tickets to boyband Bad Complexion's concert and score a date with Tina.
29	"Ace the Hero"	Anthony Watt	27 April 2014
A case of mistaken identity leads Ace to become the town hero but he soon finds out it's not as exciting as it seems.
30	"Billy Bonkers"	Paul Western-Pittard	27 April 2014
Ace and his eccentric Grandpa win a tour of the eccentric Billy Bonkers' wondrous ice cream factory but discover that Ned and Hilda have turned the whole building into one giant trap!
31	"Halloween Part 1: Dawn of the Dumb"	D.J. McPherson & James Ferris	4 May 2014
It's Funpark High's big Halloween party but while fighting off Ned, Ace turns the entire crowd into drooling, brain-dead zombies!
32	"Halloween Part 2: Halloween Hijinks"	D.J. McPherson & James Ferris	4 May 2014
With Tina trapped at the top of Creepville tower, Ace sets off to rescue her but this time Ned and Hilda aren't the only ones waiting for him – so too are a hoard of angry Zombies.
33	"History Mystery"	Paul Western-Pittard	11 May 2014
Ignoring his Grandpa's warning that a ghost haunts the dark tunnels under Funpark City, Ace and his friends set off on a spooky treasure hunt.
34	"Ace in Your Face"	Philip Dalkin	11 May 2014
The McDougal Family is selected to be contestants on the hit game show "In Your Face" but when the director orders Ace to remove his shiny braces for the camera, Hugo finds himself alone in the jungle, with Ned and Hilda on his trail.
35	"Gnomeland"	Philip Dalkin	18 May 2014
Mr. Rainer's favorite garden gnome has been destroyed and all the evidence points to Ace. Can he clear his name and find the real culprit before tough-as-nails Detective Hard Basket catches up to him?
36	"A Bad Egbert"	Anthony Watt	18 May 2014
Hilda's adorable but evil nephew Egbert comes to town and quickly wins over the whole school with his irresistibly cute looks. But Egbert may not be as sweet as he looks. Now Ace must team up with a jealous Ned to stop this new pint-sized threat.
37	"Metal Mouth Man"	Tim Bain	25 May 2014
Ace uses his braces to impress Tina and become the town's new superhero – Metal Mouth Man – but everyone knows that a good superhero needs an evil opponent and Ned and Hilda are only too happy to play their part.
38	"Jack's Back"	Tim Bain	25 May 2014
When Ace's bumbling leaves super-spy Jack Union unable to complete an important mission, Ace must step up and save Funpark City with a little help from some unexpected allies.
39	"The InterNanny"	Paul Western-Pittard	1 June 2014
When Ace's parents hire a high-tech holographic Nanny, Hugo is totally smitten with her. But when the love-struck holograms run away, Ace must chase them into a virtual world to try to get back his friend.
40	"Hugo Gets Real"	Brendan Luno	1 June 2014
A science lab accident turns Hugo into a real boy, and he couldn't be happier. He sets off to discover the world, leaving Ace to battle Ned and Hilda on his own.
41	"Bandemonium"	D.J. McPherson & Philip Dalkin	8 June 2014
At Mr. Walker's Air Guitar Camp, Ace takes the stage to show off his awesome skills but when his braces mysteriously eject into the frenzied crowd, he must find a way to get them back.
42	"Monster of Rock"	Tim Bain	8 June 2014
When Ace accidentally brings a gargoyle statue to life, the terrified town folks set out to capture the mythical creature. Now Ace must find a way to protect his gentle new friend.
43	"Barry Plotter"	Tim Bain	15 June 2014
When Ace wins the lead role in the latest Barry Plotter wizard movie, he is thrilled by his newfound fame until he learns that the part of Barry's arch nemesis Mouldy Warts is to be played by Ned!
44	"Date with Disaster"	Philip Dalkin	15 June 2014
Ace tricks Becky into a wild UFO chase so he can get some alone time with Tina. But his prank backfires when he realizes he has sent his sister right into danger!
45	"Ace in Space"	Philip Dalkin	22 June 2014
It's Anoop's birthday and Ace gives him a ride in a space shuttle simulator. But when Ned and Hilda attack, Ace accidentally launches the shuttle and finds himself in space with a gang of super nerds, any one of whom could be Ned in disguise.
46	"Cat Burglar"	Philip Dalkin	22 June 2014
Ace is outraged when his ticket to Humungous Man on Ice is stolen by a local cat burglar. So together with Athol, Claudia and Anoop, he sets out to track down the mysterious thief, unaware that the culprit is actually right under his nose.
47	"Ace Joins the Circus"	Brendan Luno	29 June 2014
Tired of Ace and Becky's constant squabbling, Jeanie sends them to circus school for the holidays. But when Ned's latest scheme leaves them dangling from the high wire, Ace and his sister must finally learn to work together.
48	"School Election"	Philip Dalkin	29 June 2014
Ace runs against Tina for school captain and discovers that high school politics is even more dangerous than battling evil super spies.
49	"Ace and the Meanstalk"	Brendan Luno	6 July 2014
Dougal enters Funpark City's gardening contest but when Ace tries to help, a mishap with his Enlargerator Ray results in a bad-tempered 50-foot plant rampaging through the city.
50	"Feathered Fiend"	Paul Western-Pittard	6 July 2014
When the Mayor tries to steal his braces, Ace suspects that she has been replaced by Ned. But he quickly learns that Ned isn't the real mastermind behind the evil plot.
51	"Hugo 2.0"	Ray Boseley	13 July 2014
Professor Pringle updates Ace's braces, giving him a superior new hologram but Ace soon begins to miss his stuffy old pal Hugo and sets out to get him back.
52	"Ace the Superspy"	Paul Western-Pittard	13 July 2014
Jack Union returns to offer Ace a job as an official Junior Super Spy but first Ace will have to pass one final test. Things only get harder when Ned and Hilda cook up the ultimate evil plot to stop him.

== Production and broadcast ==
In the past, reruns of the show aired on Eleven. The series has also aired on ABC3 as of 3 November 2014. On 9 February 2015 it was announced that, due to its popularity with viewers, a second season was greenlit, but never eventuated.

On 14 July 2015, the series was picked up by Hulu in the United States for streaming. It is currently available on Tubi & Peacock.

In France, the show aired on Boing from 13 April 2015.

From 8 September 2015, the show has aired on Teletoon in Canada (now Cartoon Network).

The show aired in Portugal in 2015/2016 on Biggs.

In India, this show aired on Marvel HQ.

== Awards and nominations ==
Award wins

2014 AWGIE Award for Best Animation

2014 Screen Music Awards - Best Music For Children's Television Series

Nominations

2015 International Emmy Awards - Best Kids Animation

2015 Apollo Awards - Best 2D Animation

2015 Cartoons on the Bay - Pulcinella Awards - Best TV Series for Kids

2015 Cartoons on the Bay - Official Selection - TV Series for Kids

2015 AACTA Awards - Best Children's Television Series

2014 Screen Music Awards - Best Music For Children's Television Series

2014 AWGIE Award for Best Animation
