= Eli Arenson =

Iceland based Cinematographer

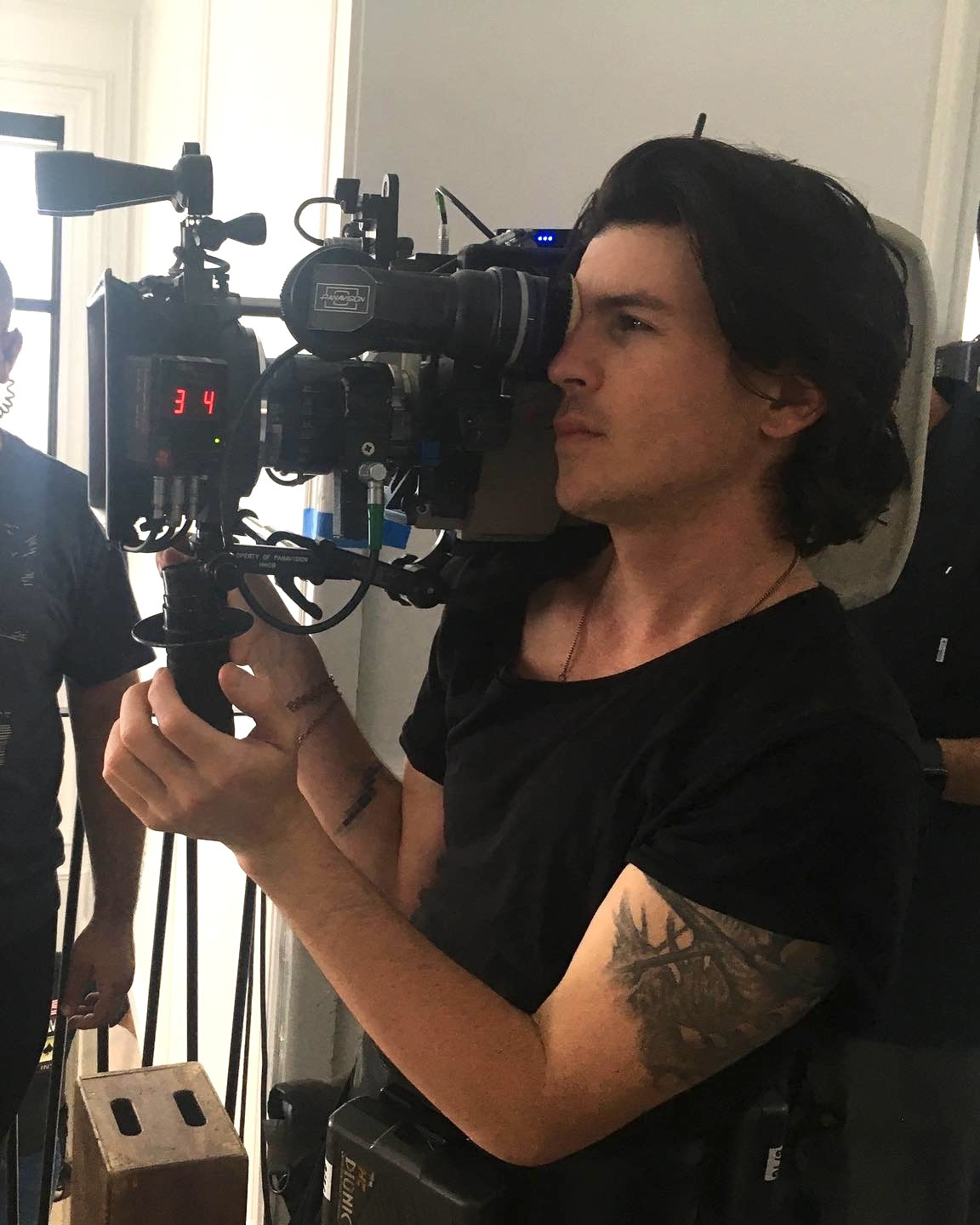
- Arenson in 2020
- Born: February 14, 1988 (age 38)
- Education: AFI Conservatory (MFA)
- Occupation: Cinematographer
- Years active: 2010 - Present
- Notable work: Lamb (2021); The Watchers (2024); The Deliverance (2024)
- Awards: Edda Awards; Gianni Di Venanzo Award
- Website: Official website

Eli Arenson (born 14 February 1988) is an Iceland based cinematographer. He is known for his work on Lamb (2021), The Deliverance (2024) and The Watchers (2024). Arenson received the Edda Awards for Best Cinematographer in 2022 for his work on the film Lamb.

== Career ==
Arenson began his career as a war photographer in 2006 before shifting into commercial and narrative films. He moved to Los Angeles in 2013 and graduated from the AFI Conservatory's MFA program in Cinematography in 2015, his thesis film All These Voices winning the student Academy Award in 2016.

In 2019, he filmed the A24 film Lamb which won the Cannes Un Certain Regard Prize of Originality (2021) and was shortlisted for the Academy Award for Best International Feature Film (2022). In 2022, Arenson teamed up with director Lee Daniels to shoot his Netflix film The Deliverance (2024), which topped the global streaming charts upon release. In 2023, producer M. Night Shyamalan hired Arenson to film The Watchers (2024), the directorial debut of Ishana Night Shyamalan distributed by Warner Bros. Pictures. In addition, he filmed the Cannes Film Festival Special Mention winning short film Fár (2023).

Arenson's work is characterized by its evocative and visually arresting qualities. His cinematography in The Watchers (2024) was praised for its atmospheric and minimalist approach, earning him widespread recognition. He has also collaborated on music videos and fashion projects with prominent artists, including Björk, A$AP Rocky and Kim Kardashian.

== Awards and recognition ==
Arenson received the Edda Award for Best Cinematographyin 2022 for Lamb, a film that was highly successful at the Icelandic Edda Awards, winning 12 awards in total. He also won the Esposimetro d'Oro for Best Cinematography in a Foreign Film at the Gianni Di Venanzo Award.

== Filmography ==
=== Film ===
Year	Title	Director	Studio
2021	Lamb	Valdimar Jóhannsson	A24
2024	The Deliverance	Lee Daniels	Netflix
2024	The Watchers	Ishana Night Shyamalan	Warner Bros. Pictures
2025	The Damned	Thordur Palsson	Vertical
TBA	Foxfinder	Aoife McArdle	TBA

=== Television ===
Year	Title	Director	Notes	Studio
2021	Trapped	Baltasar Kormákur, Börkur Sigthorsson, Katrín Björgvinsdóttir	3 episodes	Netflix
2025	Vigdís	Björn Hlynur Haraldsson, Tinna Hrafnsdóttir	full series	RUV

=== Music Video (partial list) ===
Year	Title
2024	Björk ft. Rosalìa "Oral" (Iceland)
2022	Björk "Sorrowful Soil"
2020	Dominic Fike "King of Everything"
2020	Daya "Insomnia"
2019	Mark Ronson "Late Night Feeling" ft. Lykke Li
2019	Dominic Fike "3 Nights"
2018	A$AP Rocky "Kids Turned Out Fine (LA)
2018	A$AP Rocky "A$AP Forever" ft. Moby (LA)

=== Commercials (partial list) ===
Yves Saint Laurent, Estee Lauder, Jimmy Choo, Karl Lagerfeld, Nike, Adidas, Google, Facebook, CR Fashion Book, Vogue, Moccona, Nescafe
