= Hannah Howland =

Scottish actress (born 2002)

- Born: 20 July 2002 (age 24)
- Education: Sylvia Young Theatre School; Pauline Quirke Academy Studios
- Occupation: Actress
- Years active: 2015–present

Hannah Howland (born 20 July 2002) is a Scottish actress. She began her career as a child actress on the West End. Her films include Arthur's Whisky and The Watchers (both 2024).

== Early life ==
Howland is from Falkirk in the Central Lowlands of Scotland. She attended Beaconhurst School in Bridge of Allen. She won an Andrew Lloyd Webber scholarship to attend the Sylvia Young Theatre School in London. She also won a scholarship from The Stage winner in 2018 for Pauline Quirke Academy Studios.

== Career ==
Howland played Veruca Salt as a 13 year-old in the stage production of Charlie and the Chocolate Factory directed by Sam Mendes at the Theatre Royal, Drury Lane, London. She was subsequently nominated in the Entertainment category at the Young Scot Awards.

Howland had roles in 2024 in Diane Keaton and Lulu film Arthur's Whisky, and M. Night Shyamalan produced The Watchers (entitled The Watched in the United Kingdom) alongside Dakota Fanning and Georgina Campbell.

Howland appeared in BBC One television series Beyond Paradise in 2025.

== Filmography ==
Year	Title	Role	Notes
2024	Arthur's Whisky	Young Susan	Film
2024	The Watchers	Chloe	Film
2025	Beyond Paradise	Abigail	1 episode
