= Arthur's Whisky =

British comedy film

- Release poster
- Directed by: Stephen Cookson
- Screenplay by: Alexis Zegerman
- Produced by: Stephen Cookson; Pippa Cross; Peter Keegan
- Starring: Diane Keaton; Patricia Hodge; Lulu; Adil Ray; Genevieve Gaunt; Hannah Howland; Esme Lonsdale; Bill Paterson; Lawrence Chaney; Tom Stourton; Jaime Winstone; Hayley Mills; David Harewood; Boy George
- Cinematography: David Mackie
- Edited by: William Webb
- Music by: David Newman
- Production companies: CK Films; CrossDay Productions Filmology Finance
- Distributed by: Sky Cinema
- Release date: 1 January 2024
- Running time: 94 minutes
- Country: United Kingdom
- Language: English

Arthur's Whisky is a 2024 British comedy film starring Diane Keaton, Patricia Hodge and Lulu. It is directed and produced by Stephen Cookson from a script by Alexis Zegerman. It premiered in the UK on Sky Cinema on 1 January 2024.

== Premise ==
Recently widowed Joan (Hodge) discovers that her late husband invented an Elixir of Eternal Youth and shares it with two friends Linda (Keaton) and Susan (Lulu). However, are the three women still equipped to be youthful in the modern world?

== Cast ==
- Diane Keaton as Linda
  - Genevieve Gaunt as young Linda
- Patricia Hodge as Joan
  - Esme Lonsdale as young Joan
- Lulu as Susan
  - Hannah Howland as young Susan
- Adil Ray as James
- Bill Paterson as Henry
- Lawrence Chaney as Lucy Rulez
- Tom Stourton as Robert
- Jaime Winstone as Sharon
- Hayley Mills as Karen Walters
  - Maryanne Eve as young Karen
- David Harewood as Hal
- Boy George as himself
- Marcus Fraser as Nathan
- Ossian Perret as Young Arthur
- Joanna David as Rachel
- Talitha Wing as Shyla
- Alex Guersman as Hugo
- Rae Lim as Kim Waxologist
- Ross Tomlinson as Raymondo
- Paul Antony-Barber as Karl

== Production ==
The film is produced by Stephen Cookson and Peter Keegan at CK Films and Pippa Cross at CrossDay Productions. Cookson also directs, with the screenplay written by Alexis Zegerman. Executive producers include Jack Christian, D.J. McPherson and Leighton Lloyd.

=== Casting ===
Diane Keaton was linked with the film in January 2023. In May 2023, Patricia Hodge, Lulu, David Harewood as well as Lawrence Chaney and Boy George were added to the cast. Lulu helped recruit Boy George for the role whilst he was doing a residency in Las Vegas.

=== Filming ===
Principal photography took place in 2023 with filming locations including Walton-on-Thames, in England.

== Release ==
It premiered in the UK on Sky Cinema on 1 January 2024.
