= Rock It! (TV series) =

Australian childrens television show (2007)

Rock It! is a 2007 Australian television show for kids. Each episode focused on a different topic and it was broadcast by Channel Ten on Friday mornings. It created by Dina McPherson and Gian Christian and was developed out of a live show they created from October 2000, coming from McPherson's children's party business. They created a five minute pilot for around $100,000 which was followed by a full series. Live concerts tour followed up after the series began airing and the TV series was sold into Asia in 2009.

Rock It! is a musical and educational series that follows follows Jack, Comet and Asteroid, three friends who are rocketed into outer space. Christian, who serves as a producer, plays Jupiter Jack and McPherson plays Comet They a joined by Kate Baressi playing Comet. Other characters include aliens Cosmos and Zaboo, and a computer called Gamma.

Writer Robert Greenberg was nominated for an AWGIE Award in 2007 for his work on the series.

== See also ==
- List of Australian television series
