= Lamb (2021 film) =

2021 Icelandic folk horror film

- Icelandic poster
- Icelandic: Dýrið
- Directed by: Valdimar Jóhannsson
- Written by: Sjón; Valdimar Jóhannsson
- Produced by: Marcin Drabiński; Piodor Gustafsson; Zuzanna Hencz; Hrönn Kristinsdóttir; Jon Mankell; Sara Nassim; Jan Naszewski; Erik Rydell; Klaudia Śmieja-Rostworowska
- Starring: Noomi Rapace; Hilmir Snær Guðnason; Björn Hlynur Haraldsson; Ingvar Eggert Sigurðsson
- Cinematography: Eli Arenson
- Edited by: Agnieszka Glińska
- Music by: Þórarinn Guðnason
- Production companies: Go to Sheep; Boom Films; Black Spark Productions; Madants/NEM Corp; Film i Väst; Chimney Sweden; Chimney Poland; Rabbit Hole Productions
- Distributed by: Sena (Iceland); TriArt Film (Sweden); Gutek Film (Poland)
- Release dates: 13 July 2021 (Cannes); 24 September 2021 (Iceland); 31 December 2021 (Poland); 11 March 2022 (Sweden)
- Running time: 107 minutes
- Countries: Iceland; Sweden; Poland
- Language: Icelandic
- Box office: $4.1 million

Lamb (Icelandic: Dýrið, lit. 'The Animal') is a 2021 folk horror film directed by Valdimar Jóhannsson, who co-wrote the screenplay with Sjón. It marks Valdimar's feature-length directorial debut and stars Noomi Rapace and Hilmir Snær Guðnason as a couple who adopt a mysterious human-sheep hybrid as their own.

An international co-production between Iceland, Sweden, and Poland, the film features Rapace and Hungarian filmmaker Béla Tarr as executive producers. After premiering at the 2021 Cannes Film Festival, the film was released by Sena in Iceland on 24 September 2021, Gutek Film in Poland on 31 December 2021, and TriArt Film in Sweden on 11 March 2022.

Lamb received positive reviews and grossed $4.1 million at the box office. It was Iceland's entry for Best International Feature Film at the 94th Academy Awards, and made the shortlist but was ultimately not nominated.

== Plot ==
A herd of horses in Iceland is spooked by an unknown, loudly-breathing entity that makes its way to a barn. Later, farmer María and her husband, Ingvar, are shocked when one of their pregnant sheep births a human–sheep hybrid with a mostly human body but a lamb's head and right arm.

María and Ingvar take the hybrid infant in as their own. Naming her Ada after their deceased daughter, the couple care for her as their own child. The ewe that is Ada's biological mother misses her child, loitering outside the couple's home in an attempt to contact Ada.

Ada goes missing and is later found next to the ewe. Shortly after, María kills the ewe and buries her body. Unbeknownst to her, Ingvar's roving brother Pétur, who arrives at the farmhouse shortly before the killing, witnesses the incident before sleeping in the barn.

Pétur, who makes sexual advances towards María, is very disturbed by Ada, considering her "an animal, not a child". Ingvar claims that the whole situation has given them happiness. Pétur is increasingly angered and disturbed by the couple's attachment to Ada. While everyone else is asleep, Pétur takes her on an early morning walk with the intention of shooting her. However, he has a tearful change of heart and is later seen soundly sleeping with Ada and soon becomes an uncle to her.

One evening, while María, Pétur, and Ingvar are having a drunken party, Ada witnesses the unknown entity from before near the barn. The entity kills the family's dog before taking the family's gun. After the party, a drunk Ingvar goes to bed. Pétur makes sexual advances toward María once again. When she rejects his advances, Pétur reveals that he witnessed her killing Ada's sheep mother and tries to blackmail María into having sex with him by threatening to reveal this to Ada. María pretends to be seduced by Pétur in order to lock him in a storage room.

The next morning, María unlocks the storage room and drives Pétur to a bus stop. Sending him away, she insists she is committed to a new start with her family. After waking up to find María and Pétur missing, Ingvar takes Ada to fix the broken tractor left halfway to the lake, but the attempt is unsuccessful. On their way back home, the entity, revealed to be a ram/man hybrid and Ada's biological father, emerges and shoots Ingvar in the neck before taking a tearful Ada with him and walking away into the wilderness.

María returns home and finds that Ingvar and Ada are missing. She searches for the two, discovers Ingvar before he dies, and despairs at the loss of her husband and new child. María tearfully searches the wilderness in vain.

== Cast ==
- Noomi Rapace as María
- Hilmir Snær Guðnason as Ingvar
- Björn Hlynur Haraldsson as Pétur
- Ingvar Eggert Sigurðsson as man on television
- Lára Björk Hall as the voice of Ada

== Production ==
Jóhannsson grew up with grandparents who were sheep farmers, an upbringing that influenced the film. Before directing his first feature, he worked in special effects on Rogue One (2016) and studied filmmaking under Béla Tarr. Co-screenwriter Sjón, an Icelandic poet and novelist known for collaborating with Björk, brought an interest in Icelandic folklore to the project. Sjón had previously served as the lyricist for Dancer in the Dark (2000); the song "I've Seen It All" was nominated for an Academy Award for Best Original Song. He also co-wrote The Northman (2022) with director Robert Eggers.

The character of Ada was created through a combination of practical effects and CGI, featuring about ten child actors of different ages. They wore green-screen caps that were later replaced with a digital lamb's head. Four real lambs and puppeteers were also involved. Early versions of the screenplay included dialogue for Ada, which was later removed. Rapace speaks Icelandic in the film, a language she learned after living in Iceland as a child.

== Release ==
In June 2020, the film was sold across Europe in the New Europe Film Sales agency. The film was picked up by distributors in Czech Republic (Artcam), France (The Jokers), Switzerland (Filmcoopi), Slovakia (ASFK), Germany (Koch Films), Poland (Gutek Film), Benelux (The Searchers), Hungary (Vertigo), Austria (Filmladen), Denmark (Camera Film), Lithuania (Scanorama), former Yugoslavia (Five Stars/Demiurg), Estonia (Must Käsi) and Latvia (Kino Bize) with MUBI acquiring the distribution rights for Latin America (excluding Mexico), Turkey, India, the UK and Ireland. In July 2021, A24 acquired North American distribution rights to the film.

The film had its world premiere on 13 July 2021 as part of the official selection at the 2021 Cannes Film Festival in the Un Certain Regard section. It was released in the United States on 8 October 2021. The film also had a special screening of BFI London Film Festival on 15 October 2021.

== Reception ==
=== Box office ===
In the United States and Canada, Lamb was released alongside No Time to Die and earned $1 million from 583 theaters, finishing seventh and marking the best-ever opening weekend for an Icelandic film in the U.S.

=== Critical response ===
On the review aggregator website Rotten Tomatoes, 86% of 189 critics' reviews are positive, with an average rating of 7.1/10. The website's consensus reads: "Darkly imaginative and brought to life by a pair of striking central performances, Lamb shears expectations with its singularly wooly chills." Metacritic, which uses a weighted average, assigned the film a score of 68 out of 100, based on 33 critics, indicating "generally favorable" reviews.

David Fear of Rolling Stone described the film as "the odd, unsettling, soon-to-be-your-cult-movie-of-choice straight outta Iceland", and wrote: "It's the sweetest, most touching waking nightmare you've ever experienced." Jeannette Catsoulis of The New York Times called the film an "atmospheric debut feature", and added that it "plays like a folk tale and thrums like a horror movie." She wrote: "Slow-moving and inarguably nutty, Lamb nevertheless wields its atavistic power with the straightest of faces". Michael O'Sullivan of The Washington Post also described the film as a "haunting, atmospheric feature debut", and wrote: "Johannsson has a way of imbuing everything — animate and inanimate, even an empty doorway — with a kind of living, breathing spirit." He gave the film a score of 3/4 stars. Katie Walsh of the Los Angeles Times wrote, "Ominous mountains look down upon the pastoral arena where this fantastical yet meditative rural drama plays out; it's a modern folk tale about the strange realities of life and death that such a closeness to nature affords." Joe Morgenstern of The Wall Street Journal described the film as "a shaggy lamb story expertly told." Kevin Maher of The Times gave the film 4/5 stars, writing, "The director, Valdimar Johannsson, treats the admittedly ridiculous material with a convincing, deadpan seriousness and is supported at every step by his star performer on impeccable form."

Richard Brody of The New Yorker was more critical of the film, saying that it "preens and strains to be admired even as it reduces its characters to pieces on a game board and its actors to puppets." Barry Hertz of The Globe and Mail criticized the film's ending as being "like a parody of an A24 horror movie", and wrote, "I won't make the obvious joke and say it's baaad. But its sheep thrills are mutton to write home about, either." Alison Willmore of Vulture wrote, "By the time the final act rolls around, Lamb approaches the idea that there's a price that must be paid with a shrugging diffidence rather than impending doom. It's such an underwhelming conclusion to a film with such a compelling start."

The film ranks on Rotten Tomatoes' Best Horror Movies of 2021.

=== Accolades ===
Award	Category	Recipient	Result	Ref
2021 Cannes Film Festival	Un Certain Regard Prize of Originality	Lamb	Won	
2021 Cannes Film Festival	Palm Dog Award – Grand Jury Prize	Panda (sheepdog)	Won	
Nordic Council Film Prize	Best Film	Valdimar Jóhannsson, Sjón, Hrönn Kristinsdóttir, Sara Nassim	Won	
Edda Awards 2022	Film of the Year	Lamb	Won	
Edda Awards 2022	Director of the Year	Valdimar Jóhannsson	Won	
Edda Awards 2022	Screenplay of the Year	Valdimar Jóhannsson, Sjón	Won	
Edda Awards 2022	Supporting Actor of the Year	Björn Hlynur Haraldsson	Won	
Sitges Film Festival	Best Film	Lamb	Won	
Sitges Film Festival	Best Actress	Noomi Rapace	Won	

The film was nominated in 13 Edda Award categories. It ultimately won 12 awards. The Nordic Council jury described the film as "unique and darkly menacing."

== See also ==
- List of submissions to the 94th Academy Awards for Best International Feature Film
- List of Icelandic submissions for the Academy Award for Best International Feature Film
