= Oliver Finnegan =

Irish actor

- Born: Ireland
- Occupation: Actor
- Years active: 2017–present

Oliver Finnegan is an Irish actor.

== Filmography ==
=== Television ===
Year	Title	Role	Notes
2017	Man in an Orange Shirt	Wykeham	Episode: "Part 1"
2018	Outlander	Lord William Ransom	Episode: "Blood of My Blood"
2019	Creeped Out	Gabe	Episode: "Itchy"
2021	We Are Lady Parts	Oliver / Student 1	Episode: "Play Something"
2025	Video Nasty	Topher	4 episodes

=== Film ===
Year	Title	Role	Notes
2024	The Watchers	Daniel	
2024	Bitter Weeds	Liam	Short film
