= Bob the Builder (2015 TV series) =

2015 CGI animated children's television series

- Genre: Animated series Children's animation
- Based on: Bob the Builder by: Keith Chapman
- Voices of: Lee Ingleby (UK); Joanne Froggatt; Jacob Scipio (UK); Colin Murdock (US); Ian James Corlett (US); Lee Tockar (US)
- Theme music composer: Paul K. Joyce
- Opening theme: "Can We Fix It?" (revised lyrics)
- Ending theme: "Can We Fix It?" (instrumental)
- Composers: David Schweitzer (2015–2017); Tim Foy (2018); Paul Koffman (2018)
- Country of origin: United Kingdom
- Original language: English
- No. of series: 3
- No. of episodes: 130 (+1 special) (list of episodes)

Production
- Executive producers: Kim Dent Wilder (2015–2017); Michael Hefferon (2015–2017); Edward Catchpole (2015–2016); Christopher Keenan (2015–2018); Steven DeNure (2018); Kirsten Newlands (2018)
- Producers: Kylie Ellis (2015–2017); Fred de Bradeny (2015–2017)
- Production companies: HIT Entertainment (series 1–2); Mattel Creations (series 3)

Original release
- Network: Channel 5
- Release: 1 September 2015 – 30 December 2018

Related
- Bob the Builder (original series)

Bob the Builder is a British animated television series and a reboot of the 1999 animated television series of the same name. It was produced by HIT Entertainment and animated by Mainframe Studios for the first and second seasons. Its third and final season was instead produced by Mattel Creations and animated by DHX Media's Halifax studio.

It originally ran from the United Kingdom on Channel 5 from 1 September 2015 to 30 December 2018 for three total series, with over 130 episodes produced.

== Episodes ==
Series	Episodes	Originally released		
Series	Episodes	First released	Last released	Network
1	52	1 September 2015	29 February 2016	UK: Channel 5 US: PBS Kids
2	52	27 June 2016	7 September 2017	UK: Channel 5 US: PBS Kids
3	26	2 January 2018	30 December 2018	UK: Channel 5

== Production and broadcast ==
Turner Broadcasting System bought the broadcasting rights to the 2015 series in the United Kingdom to be repeated on Cartoon Network UK's sister preschool channel Cartoonito UK. The channel began airing the series in January 2016.

In the US, the series aired on PBS Kids from 7 November 2015 to 20 November 2018. Qubo aired the series from 2019 to 2021 for the British dub before Qubo ceased operations. The show currently airs on Kids Street.

In Canada, the series aired on Family Jr. while in Quebec, the series aired on Télé-Québec.

In the Arab Countries, the series airs on Spacetoon and e-Junior.

In Australia, the series airs on 10 Peach and then on ABC Kids.

In New Zealand, the series airs on TVNZ.
