= Troppo (TV series) =

Australian TV drama series

- Promotional poster
- Genre: Drama
- Created by: Yolanda Ramke
- Directed by: Jocelyn Moorhouse; Catherine Millar; Grant Brown; Yolanda Ramke; Ben Howling
- Starring: Thomas Jane; Nicole Chamoun
- Country of origin: Australia
- Original language: English
- No. of series: 2
- No. of episodes: 16

Production
- Executive producers: Greg Quail, Mikael Borglund, Lisa Duff, David Ogilvie
- Producers: Lisa Duff, Karl Zwicky
- Production location: Queensland, Australia
- Camera setup: Multi Camera
- Running time: 60 minutes
- Production companies: EQ Media Group; Beyond Entertainment; AGC Television; Renegade Entertainment; Aperture Media Partners

Original release
- Network: ABC Television
- Release: 27 February 2022 – 23 August 2024

Troppo is an Australian television crime drama series starring Thomas Jane and Nicole Chamoun. The first season premiered on ABC TV on 27 February 2022. The show's second season premiered on 5 July 2024 on ABC TV and iview, with Amazon Prime Video and Amazon Freevee both airing it from 25 July 2024.

== Premise ==
Troppo is based on the best-selling novel Crimson Lake by Candice Fox, in which a former police officer helps a private investigator look for a missing man in Far North Queensland.

== Cast and characters ==
=== Main ===
- Thomas Jane as Ted Conkaffey
- Nicole Chamoun as Amanda Pharrell
- David Lyons as Inspector Lou Damford
- Sun Park as Yoon Sun Park (Hangul: 박윤선, Bag Yun-seon), wife of missing person
- Yerin Ha as Ah Rah Park (season 1) (Hangul: 박아라, Bag A-la), daughter of missing person
- Ling Cooper Tang as Sergeant Carrie Hench
- Kate Beahan as Olivia
- Cramer Cain as Wayne
- Peta Wilson as Eve
- Angela Punch McGregor as Dr. Val, medical examiner and emergency room doctor
- Damien Garvey as Roy
- Josh Helman as Bryce
- Radha Mitchell as Kelly

=== Supporting and recurring ===
- Wendy Mocke as Maali
- Thomas Weatherall as Charlie
- Lucas Linehan as Milbee
- Miranda Frangou as Georgie
- Chris Alosio as Jayjay
- Sara West as Brooke
- Sonny Le as Jong Min Park, a Korean scientist reported missing
- Bryan Probets as Lars
- Simon Lyndon as Twist
- Molly Belle Wright as Lilly
- Caroline Brazier as Joanne
- Rachael Ward as Lauren
- Libby Munro as Anita
- Georgina Naidu as Devi Chandran
- Anna McGahan as Frankie
- Arka Das as Khalid
- Fletcher Humphrys as Sharon
- Brett Tucker as Colin a Reporter (season 2)
- Zindzi Okenyo as Detective Sweeney (season 2)

== Episodes ==
=== Season 1 ===
No.	Title	Directed by	Teleplay by	Original release date
1	"Episode 1"	Jocelyn Moorhouse	Yolanda Ramke	27 February 2022
2	"Episode 2"	Jocelyn Moorhouse	Blake Ayshford and Yolanda Ramke	6 March 2022
3	"Episode 3"	Catherine Millar	Yolanda Ramke and Andrew Lee	13 March 2022
4	"Episode 4"	Catherine Millar	Jane Allen and Penelope Chai	20 March 2022
5	"Episode 5"	Grant Brown	Craig Irvin and Yolanda Ramke	27 March 2022
6	"Episode 6"	Grant Brown	Jane Allen and Kodie Bedford	3 April 2022
7	"Episode 7"	Ben Howling and Yolanda Ramke	Jane Allen	10 April 2022
8	"Episode 8"	Ben Howling and Yolanda Ramke	Yolanda Ramke	17 April 2022

=== Season 2 ===
No.	Title	Directed by	Teleplay by	Original release date
1	"Episode 1"	Grant Brown	Yolanda Ramke, Candice Fox, Jane Allen	5 July 2024
2	"Episode 2"	Grant Brown	Yolanda Ramke, Candice Fox, Chelsea Cassio	12 July 2024
3	"Episode 3"	Robyn Grace	Yolanda Ramke, Candice Fox, Kit Brookman	19 July 2024
4	"Episode 4"	Robyn Grace	Yolanda Ramke, Candice Fox, Andrew Anastasios	26 July 2024
5	"Episode 5"	Thomas Jane	Yolanda Ramke, Candice Fox, Boyd Quakawoot	2 August 2024
6	"Episode 6"	Thomas Jane	Yolanda Ramke, Candice Fox, Cole Haddon	9 August 2024
7	"Episode 7"	Grant Brown	Yolanda Ramke, Candice Fox, Angela McDonald	16 August 2024
8	"Episode 8"	Grant Brown	Yolanda Ramke, Candice Fox, Andrew Anastasios	23 August 2024

== Production ==
The series was created by Yolanda Ramke, and Jocelyn Moorhouse is set-up director. Karl Zwicky is the series producer, with executive producers AGC's Stuart Ford and Lourdes Diaz; Thomas Jane and Courtney Lauren Penn (for Thomas's Renegade Entertainment banner); ABC's Sally Riley and Andrew Gregory; EQ Media Group's Greg Quail, Simonne Overend and Lisa Duff; Beyond Entertainment's Mikael Borglund and David Ogilvy; and Jack Christian and D.J. McPherson.

The eight-part series was filmed in the Gold Coast hinterland of Queensland, Australia, although the story is set in Far North Queensland. Filming concluded in October 2021.

Screen Queensland announced the completion of filming of Season Two on 16 October 2023, with the second series to be set six months after the first season.

== Release ==
The series premiered on ABC TV and ABC iview in Australia on 27 February 2022. In the United States, IMDb TV (now Amazon Freevee) picked up the series, and it premiered on 20 May 2022.

The show's second season premiered on 5 July 2024 on ABC TV and iView, with Amazon Prime and Freevee both airing it simultaneously from 25 July 2024.

== Viewership ==
Troppo : AUS viewers per episode (thousands)
Source: Consolidated audience measurement according to OzTAM

Ep	Airdate	Metro overnights	Rank	Total consolidated	Rank	Ref
1	27 February 2022	353,000	12	806,000	8	
2	6 March 2022	263,000	14	562,000	11	
3	13 March 2022	222,000	15	456,000	13	
4	20 March 2022	236,000	14	486,000	12	
5	27 March 2022	208,000	20	439,000	14	
6	3 April 2022	<201,000	<20	411,000	15	
7	10 April 2022	219,000	19	407,000	15	
8	17 April 2022	211,000	12	409,000	9	
