= I Used to Be Famous =

2022 British musical drama film

- Directed by: Eddie Sternberg
- Screenplay by: Zak Klein; Eddie Sternberg
- Produced by: Collie McCarthy
- Starring: Ed Skrein; Leo Long; Eleanor Matsuura
- Cinematography: Angus Hudson
- Edited by: Julian Ulrichs
- Music by: David M Saunders
- Production companies: Forty Foot Pictures, Filmkowski
- Distributed by: Netflix
- Release date: 2022
- Country: United Kingdom
- Language: English

I Used to Be Famous is a 2022 British musical comedy-drama film made by Forty Foot Pictures for Netflix. Directed by Eddie Sternberg in his feature length debut, and starring Ed Skrein, Eleanor Matsuura and Leo Long. The film debuted on Netflix on 16 September 2022.

== Plot ==
Vince Denham used to be famous as "Vinnie D", one of five members of the boy band Stereo Dream. 20 years later, he lives unemployed in Peckham, London. Desperate to recapture his former success, he struggles to write a first solo album. One day he starts practising on his keyboard in the middle of a market when 18-year-old Stevie starts drumming along. The crowd is captivated, but the show ends abruptly when Stevie's worried mother Amber pulls him away.

A video of the performance goes viral, and after some scouting Vince finds a local pub manager who agrees to let them perform at an upcoming music night. Vince searches for Stevie, and stumbles across him and Amber again when he overhears and joins a drumming circle at a church. He invites Stevie to perform, but Amber immediately refuses. She explains that Stevie is autistic: he is unable to handle crowds or unusual situations, and she does not trust that Vince can handle his meltdowns. However, she changes her mind when Vince is able to calm Stevie down with a drumming exercise they learned at the church.

Dubbed "The Tin Men", the gig starts well, but after Vince punches a man for heckling Stevie the landlord kicks them out. Amber breaks off contact between the two. Vince spirals into depression, remembering how he chose going on tour with Stereo Dream over visiting his terminally ill brother Ted, missing his death and causing an estrangement with his mother. Meanwhile, Stevie lashes out at Amber, accusing her of secretly resenting him for forcing her to quit her dancing career to care for him, and insisting that Vince meant well. He begins visiting local pubs and secures another gig for The Tin Men, then sets Vince up with an opportunity to apologise to Amber. Vince and Stevie begin practising and writing new songs again.

Former Stereo Dream member Austin Roberts sees a video of The Tin Men and offers Vince the chance to be the opening act on his final tour. Their old manager also offers him a recording contract, but dismisses Stevie as "a special needs kid"—he demands that Vince performs as a solo act, and only uses label-approved studio musicians instead of Stevie. Vince is appalled, but also unable to resist the opportunity—he accepts. He tries to let Stevie down gently by spinning it as an opportunity for him to pursue his own dream of enrolling at a music school. Stevie is distraught, but does as Vince suggests, and he manages to win a place at the Royal College of Music.

Amber visits Vince secretly, and thanks him for making her realise Stevie's potential, but also demands that Vince cut off contact entirely, worried that Stevie now has an unrealistic expectation of achieving the success Vince promised. Vince agrees, but later in the studio is alienated by his label-assigned producers' choices, including removing Stevie's drumming for a more "contemporary" electronic beat. On Stevie's birthday, he decides to set up one final surprise Tin Men gig at the market where they first performed together. As Amber and Stevie arrive, he invites Stevie onto the stage. A huge crowd gathers and cheers for Stevie, and Amber, unable to resist, joins in.

== Cast ==
- Ed Skrein as Vince
- Leo Long as Stevie
- Eleanor Matsuura as Amber
- Kurt Egyiawan as Dia
- Eoin Macken as Austin
- Lorraine Ashbourne as Cheryl
- Neil Stuke as Dennis
- Marcus Fraser as Mike

== Production ==
Sternberg co-wrote the screenplay with Zak Klein, adapting from Sternberg's short film of the same name. Sternberg based the character of Stevie on his cousin, who is autistic and a drummer. The film is produced by Collie McCarthy at Forty Foot Pictures for Netflix and was developed in association with production company Filmkowski.

Long, who plays Stevie who has autism, is neurodivergent himself and diagnosed with a speech and language condition. Long said he is determined to make the industry more 'people-friendly' for disabled musicians & actors. He performed with the London Youth Folk Ensemble and National Open Youth Orchestra prior to his work on the film. The National Autistic Society provided advice and guidance throughout the production.

== Release ==
The film debuted on Netflix on 16 September 2022 and went into the top two on the Netflix chart in the United Kingdom.

== Reception ==
The film was a Netflix hit, reaching Top Ten in sixty-two countries, including number two in the UK and number eight in the US. Leo Long was nominated for British Independent Film Award for Breakthrough Performance. On the review aggregator website Rotten Tomatoes, 89% of 9 critics' reviews are positive.

Digital Spy and Tech Radar gave the film four stars each. Glen Kenny in The New York Times praises Skrein for "mostly winning ingenuousness" of his performance, and especially the "seamlessness with which [Long] and his compelling character fit into picture…is the most noteworthy thing about it". He says the film strays into cliché but that makes the "ending which actually takes an exit ramp off triumphalist clichés, genuinely surprising." Lesley Felperin in The Guardian described it as "schematic but sweet-natured".
