= The Deliverance (film) =

2024 film by Lee Daniels

- Release poster
- Directed by: Lee Daniels
- Written by: David Coggeshall; Elijah Bynum
- Produced by: Lee Daniels; Todd Crites; Jackson Nguyen; Tucker Tooley; Pamela Oas Williams
- Starring: Andra Day; Glenn Close; Aunjanue Ellis-Taylor; Mo'Nique
- Cinematography: Eli Arenson
- Edited by: Stan Salfas
- Music by: Lucas Vidal
- Production companies: Lee Daniels Entertainment; Tucker Tooley Entertainment; Turn Left Productions
- Distributed by: Netflix
- Release date: August 16, 2024
- Running time: 112 minutes
- Country: United States
- Language: English

The Deliverance is a 2024 American supernatural horror film directed by Lee Daniels and written by David Coggeshall, and Elijah Bynum. Inspired by the Ammons haunting case, it stars Andra Day with Caleb McLaughlin, Aunjanue Ellis-Taylor, Tasha Smith, Omar Epps, Mo'Nique, and Glenn Close.

The film depicts the Jackson family from Pittsburgh, Pennsylvania, as they relocate to a new home, where they encounter unusual and demonic events. These occurrences lead both the family and the surrounding community to believe that the house serves as a gateway to Hell.

The film was released in select theaters on August 16, 2024, and became available for streaming on Netflix starting August 30.

== Plot ==
Ebony Jackson is a single mother of eldest teenage son Nate, teenage daughter Shante, and youngest son Dre. The family has recently moved into a new house, marking their third relocation in a short period, and is joined by Ebony's elderly mother Alberta, who has cancer and recently converted to Christianity. Unaware that her insurance no longer covers her treatments, Alberta continues receiving care, with Ebony secretly paying the costs out of pocket. As a result, Ebony has fallen behind on numerous financial obligations and is now facing debt collection.

Adding to the family's difficulties are Ebony's personal struggles: she has a criminal past, including a prison sentence, and an extensive history of alcohol abuse. When intoxicated, she has been physically abusive toward her children, prompting the intervention of Child Protective Services. Caseworker Cynthia has been assigned to supervise the family, from whom she faces contempt.

Shortly after moving, Dre begins speaking to and about an unseen presence he calls Tre, claiming it lives alternately in the basement and bedroom closet. A dead cat is later discovered in the basement, as well as a large hole in its unfinished concrete floor. Dre is repeatedly drawn to the basement, and each time he is found afterward in a catatonic state.

Nate and Shante also begin acting strange. One night, a drunken Ebony hears loud banging from the children's bedroom and storms in. Alberta, alerted by the children's screams, rushes to find a large hole in the wall and Ebony on the floor holding a baseball bat, though Ebony denies harming anyone or causing the damage.

Cynthia visits the house after being unable to locate the family at their prior residence and confronts Ebony about bruises on the children, though the family denies Ebony's involvement. The family notices a woman watching them from a parked car and assumes she is associated with Cynthia. That same day, all three children experience unexplained psychiatric episodes at school and are hospitalized. However, doctors find no underlying issues, and they are discharged.

The woman in the car later approaches Ebony, revealing she is a Pentecostal pastor who tried to stop a tragedy that occurred in the house 20 years earlier, in which a mother slaughtered her family before killing herself. She claims a demon possessed the woman and is now targeting Ebony's family. Ebony initially dismisses the story but returns home to find Alberta's crucifix on the wall aflame and Alberta herself dead by Dre's hand. The children are taken into custody and Ebony undergoes a psychiatric evaluation, but Cynthia convinces the authorities not to commit her.

Later, Cynthia witnesses Dre crawl backwards up a wall and realizes that supernatural forces are at play. The pastor prays the sinner's prayer with Ebony, who becomes a believer. Together, they remove Dre from the hospital in an attempt to perform a deliverance at the house. The demon—calling itself Tre—possesses Dre to kill the pastor and attack Ebony, who uses holy anointing oil against him. Meanwhile, Nate and Shante are possessed remotely and begin exhibiting supernatural injuries.

On the verge of death, Ebony calls upon Jesus for help. Suddenly filled with the Holy Spirit, she begins speaking in tongues and succeeds in exorcising the demon. However, during the process, Nate and Shante develop stigmata.

In the aftermath, Ebony and Cynthia agree to work together to regain full custody of the children, and Ebony gifts Cynthia a cross necklace to help instill a deeper faith in her. Six months later, Ebony is reunited with her children and the family relocates to Philadelphia, where Ebony announces that she and the children's father are reconciling. Years later, the house is demolished, but reports of paranormal activity in the area persist.

== Cast ==
- Andra Day as Ebony Jackson, an alcoholic mother of a Pennsylvania family whose children allegedly became demonically possessed
- Glenn Close as Alberta Jackson, Ebony's religious mother
- Anthony B. Jenkins as Andre Jackson, Ebony's youngest son
- Caleb McLaughlin as Nathaniel "Nate" Jackson, Ebony's eldest son
- Demi Singleton as Shante Jackson, Ebony's daughter
- Aunjanue Ellis-Taylor as Reverend Bernice James
- Mo'Nique as Cynthia Henry, a department of child services worker
- Omar Epps as Melvin
- Miss Lawrence as Asia
- Colleen Camp as Doctor Hoffsteder
- Juanita Jennings as Mrs. Tucker
- Kimberly Russell as Mrs. Ross
- Tasha Smith as Pastor Powell

== Production ==
In January 2022, it was reported that Lee Daniels would direct and Andra Day, Octavia Spencer, Glenn Close, Rob Morgan, Caleb McLaughlin and Aunjanue Ellis-Taylor would star in the film. In April 2022, Mo'Nique, who last worked with Daniels in the 2009 film Precious, replaced Octavia Spencer in the role. Also that month, Tasha Smith was cast. Omar Epps, Demi Singleton, Miss Lawrence, and Anthony B. Jenkins round out the cast.

The film was shot in mid-2022 in Pittsburgh.

Speaking about collaborating with Netflix on the making of the film, Daniels said:

Netflix kept saying tension, tension, tension, tension. And I didn't really want tension. The tension is whether or not (the lead character) was going to beat them kids. That, to me, is the tension, not that shit that is going on in the house. I gave up a little bit and just said, "Okay, let me just give them what they want a little bit because it's a Lee Daniels film, but it's also a Netflix film." I sold out a little bit because we're not in the world of cinema. We're in the world of clicks where, if they're not invested in the first five or ten minutes, they'll turn that shit off.

== Release ==
In January 2022, Netflix won a bidding war among seven studios that also included Metro-Goldwyn-Mayer and Miramax over the film rights in a deal of "upward of $65 million, covering the film's budget and buyouts"; the film's net budget was estimated at $30 million when submitted. It was released in select theaters on August 16, 2024, and on Netflix on August 30.

== Reception ==
On the review aggregator website Rotten Tomatoes, 34% of 82 critics' reviews are positive, with an average rating of 4.9/10. The website's consensus reads: "Lee Daniels' foray into horror works best when it leans into his melodramatic preoccupations, but it fails to deliver the exorcism goods." Metacritic, which uses a weighted average, assigned the film a score of 39 out of 100, based on 20 critics, indicating "generally unfavorable" reviews.

== See also ==
- Exorcism in Christianity
