= The Watchers (film) =

2024 film by Ishana Night Shyamalan

- Theatrical release poster
- Directed by: Ishana Night Shyamalan
- Screenplay by: Ishana Night Shyamalan
- Based on: The Watchers by A. M. Shine
- Produced by: M. Night Shyamalan; Ashwin Rajan; Nimitt Mankad
- Starring: Dakota Fanning; Georgina Campbell; Olwen Fouéré; Oliver Finnegan; Hannah Howland; Alistair Brammer; John Lynch
- Cinematography: Eli Arenson
- Edited by: Job ter Burg
- Music by: Abel Korzeniowski
- Production companies: Blinding Edge Pictures; Inimitable Pictures
- Distributed by: New Line Cinema (through Warner Bros. Pictures)
- Release date: June 7, 2024 (United States)
- Running time: 102 minutes
- Country: United States
- Language: English
- Budget: $30 million
- Box office: $33.4 million

The Watchers is a 2024 American supernatural horror fantasy film written for the screen and directed by Ishana Night Shyamalan in her directorial debut, produced by her father M. Night Shyamalan, and based on the 2021 novel by A. M. Shine. It stars Dakota Fanning, Georgina Campbell, Olwen Fouéré, Hannah Howland, and Oliver Finnegan, and follows Mina, a 28-year-old artist who becomes lost in a vast, untouched forest in the west of Ireland. Seeking shelter, she becomes trapped alongside three strangers who are stalked by mysterious creatures every night.

The Watchers was released theatrically in the United States by Warner Bros. Pictures on June 7, 2024. The film received negative reviews from critics and grossed $33 million worldwide.

== Plot ==
At a pet shop in Galway, Mina is asked to deliver a golden conure parrot to a zoo near Belfast. Midway through the journey, her car breaks down in a forest. As she tries to find her way, she encounters a bunker with an old woman named Madeline who tells her to get inside if she wants to live.

Madeline is staying in this 'Coop' with Ciara and Daniel after being lost as well. Shortly after nightfall, they all assemble in front of the Coop's mirrored window for "the Watchers". Madeline tells Mina that the Watchers will enjoy meeting her and that she will be safe if she follows the rules: The Watchers kill anyone outside the Coop at night and nobody must enter the Burrows, the underground tunnels where the Watchers retreat during the day because of their aversion to sunlight.

The group has been stranded in the forest for several months. Ciara's husband John left the Coop days earlier but has not returned. Daniel helps Mina explore a Burrow, where she unearths several items like a camcorder and a bicycle and narrowly escapes a Watcher. That night, John appears at the Coop. Madeline refuses to let him in, convinced it is a Watcher imitating John. The Watchers crack the mirror in anger. Madeline returns the items to the Burrow to appease them.

As winter falls, the group begins to turn hostile against one another. Daniel locks Mina and Madeline out of the Coop one night, forcing them to seek shelter in the forest. They witness the Watchers, humanoid creatures that imitate the Coop's occupants, react angrily to Madeline and Mina's absence.

The pair get back into the Coop and Madeline explains that the Watchers are shapeshifting fairies attempting to learn how to better mimic humans. As the Watchers attack the Coop, the group finds a hidden door to an underground study where Mina uncovers Professor Rory Kilmartin's video diaries.

Kilmartin had come to the forest to study the fairies. He captured one of them and bonded with it. By his last entry, the professor had become depressed, but he explained how to escape from the forest and requested that his research at the university be destroyed. Then he went upstairs to shoot his captive and then himself.

The next day, the group follows the professor's directions to a river at the edge of the forest. Madeline shows them a stone marker where the fairies were imprisoned without their wings after a war with humans. A Watcher mimicking John kills Daniel. The others take the Professor's boat back to civilization.

Mina visits the professor's university office to destroy his notes. She learns humans and fairies once lived in harmony, with some even producing hybrid offspring. She is horrified to learn that Madeline looks like Chloe, the remarkable "chav", who died in 2001 and realizes that Madeline is a fairy.

At Ciara's, they are attacked by Madeline. She explains she was cast out by the Watchers because she could endure sunlight. Mina suggests it is because Madeline is one of the hybrids. Mina implores her to let go of her hatred towards humans and find other hybrids. Madeline sprouts wings and flies away.

Mina reconciles with her estranged twin sister Lucy and explains that Madeline is still watching her, currently in the form of a young girl in a crowd.

== Cast ==
- Dakota Fanning as Mina/Lucy
  - Hannah and Emily Dargan as young Mina/Lucy
- Georgina Campbell as Ciara
- Olwen Fouéré as Madeline
- Oliver Finnegan as Daniel
- Alistair Brammer as John, Ciara's husband
- John Lynch as Professor Kilmartin
- Siobhan Hewlett as Mina's mother
- Anthony Morris as Burke
- Shane O'Regan as Colin
- Hannah Howland as Chloe, The Chav
- Kya Brame as Georgia
- Ffion Haf as Daria
- Shannon Antonia as Tanya
- Kofi De-Graft Jordan as Bobby
- Charles Camrose as Conor
- Charlie Mann as Romeo
- Jacob Greenway as Jordan
- Andrea Bechis as Dom
- Cara Steele as Millie

== Production ==
In February 2023, New Line Cinema announced it would produce The Watchers, written and directed by Ishana Night Shyamalan in her feature directorial debut. That April, Dakota Fanning and Georgina Campbell joined the cast. Principal photography took place in Dublin, Wicklow and Galway from July to September 2023. In mid-July, production was granted an interim agreement to continue filming during the 2023 SAG-AFTRA strike. The film was self-financed by Ishana's father, M. Night Shyamalan, and sold to Warner Bros. for $30 million.

The topic of nepotism was raised throughout the film's press tour because of Ishana's industry connection. In an interview, she said,

It's something that I consider and have considered every day in the process. I was very afraid of what those implications would be and if I would be judged. Having something to prove when you walk into a room and a space is never a bad thing and makes you work harder and makes you want it more.

In another interview, she said discussions around nepotism were "totally valid", that what was important was the "reaction to the privilege", and:

By nature of being born into this life and having a parent in the industry, there's definitely a sort of advantage stepping into the field, you just have that sense of being able to achieve it – I think as with any child pursuing their parent's field.

== Release ==
The Watchers was theatrically released in the United States, United Kingdom and Ireland on June 7, 2024, by Warner Bros. Pictures. The release was briefly shifted to June 14 before returning to its original date. It was titled The Watched in the United Kingdom and Ireland.

== Reception ==
=== Box office ===
The Watchers grossed $19.1 million in the United States and Canada, and $13.9 million internationally, for a worldwide total of $33 million.

In the United States and Canada, The Watchers was released alongside Bad Boys: Ride or Die, and was projected to gross around $8–10 million from 3,350 theaters in its opening weekend. The film made $2.9 million on its first day (including $1 million from Thursday night previews) and went on to gross $7 million from its opening weekend, finishing in fourth.

=== Critical response ===
The film received negative reviews. On the review aggregator website Rotten Tomatoes, 33% of 183 critics' reviews are positive. The website's consensus reads: "Heavy on eerie mood but undone by an obtuse script, The Watchers can only hold the gaze for so long before tedium sets in." Metacritic, which uses a weighted average, assigned the film a score of 46 out of 100, based on 38 critics, indicating "mixed or average" reviews. Audiences polled by CinemaScore gave the film an average grade of "C–" on an A+ to F scale, while those polled by PostTrak gave it a 55% overall positive score, with 36% saying they would definitely recommend the film.

Several critics negatively compared Shyamalan's style to her father's. (Note: Multiple references:) Dylan Roth of Observer commended the Shyamalan family for "never obscuring the nepotism at play" during the press tour, but wrote, "The Watchers did not convince me of much. Worse, it is precisely what I'm sure the young director hoped it wouldn't be—a pale imitation of her father's patented style." In a similarly negative but contrasting review, Bob Strauss of the San Francisco Chronicle wrote, "There's an inelegant blend of Celtic folklore thriller ... [and] contemporary horror movie tropes that renders the result unsatisfying for fans of either genre. And yet, Shyamalan proves herself a proficient director throughout most of this slog." RelishMix, which analyzes activity across social media platforms to summarize the public's general responses to a film's marketing, said it received 9% more attention than "first installment horror norms" but that "negative convo on The Watchers is limited to those turned off by M. Night Shyamalan's involvement as a producer after being dissatisfied with many of his past cinematic ventures."

In a mixed review for AV Club, Katie Rife concluded, "The Watchers is clearly a first film, with the promise and the problems that come with it." Michael Phillips's review for Chicago Tribune, rated three out of four stars, stated that Shyamalan "works well with cinematographer Eli Arenson to envelop the chamber-sized ensemble in various shades of dread, or comfort, especially residing in the character Chloe, the Chav. Her presence is so immaculate that it shines brighter than the concealer lathered on her lips." Saibal Chatterjee of NDTV gave the film 2.5/5 stars, writing, "The Watchers starts on an extremely promising note. But only a small fraction of the anticipation that it raises is satiated. Be that as it may, there is just enough in the shadows that the director creates to make sizeable chunks of the film watchable, even immersive."
