= Kangaroo Beach =

Australian animated TV series

- Genre: Children
- Created by: Tim Bain
- Written by: Tim Bain; Charlotte Rose Hamlyn; Simon Dodd; Samantha Carroll
- Directed by: David Webster; Steve Moltzen (seasons 2–present)
- Opening theme: "Kangaroo Beach" performed by Josh Pyke
- Composer: Michael Szumowski
- Country of origin: Australia
- Original language: English
- No. of series: 3
- No. of episodes: 72

Production
- Executive producer: Patrick Egerton
- Producer: Celine Goetz
- Running time: 11 minutes
- Production companies: Cheeky Little Media; Siamese (season 3)

Original release
- Network: ABC Kids
- Release: January 25, 2021 – present

Kangaroo Beach is an Australian animated television series for preschool children which debuted on ABC Kids on 25 January 2021. It was created by Tim Bain, who is also a writer with Charlotte Rose Hamlyn, Simon Dodd and Samantha Carroll. Producers are Celine Goetz and Isla Curtis, and the executive producer is Patrick Egerton from Cheeky Little Media. It was commissioned by ABC Children's and is financed and consulting on water safety information will be Bruce 'Hoppo' Hopkins (Bondi Rescue) and Craig Riddington of Surf Educators International.

== Characters ==
Five junior lifeguards, kangaroo Pounce, koala Frizzy Bearheart, wombat Neville, mischievous echidna Spyke (introduced in series 3), and platypus Gemma are on their way to becoming heroes of Kangaroo Beach, under the guidance of grown-up lifeguards Bondi, Sandy and Big Trev.

The series stars the voices of Kitty Flanagan, Matt Hardie and Rupert Degas, and a cast of children playing the Kangaroo Beach cadets.

=== Main ===
- Bondi (voiced by Matt Hardie)
- Sandy (voiced by Kitty Flanagan)
- Big Trev (voiced by Rupert Degas)
- Frizzy Bearheart (voiced by Eliza Hynes (series 1–2), Kiki Wales (series 3))
- Gemma (voiced by Millie Egerton)
- Spyke (voiced by Willow Smee) (introduced in series 3)
- Pounce (voiced by Harriet Hynes (series 1–2), Blake Stevens (series 3))
- Neville (voiced by Jerra Wright-Smith (series 1–2), Isaac Trainer (series 3))

=== Recurring ===
- Lin (voiced by Jason Chong)
- Wei (voiced by Skye Wright-Smith)
- Phillipa (voiced by Sebastian Bain)
- Charlene (voiced by Michelle Doake)
- Shelley (voiced by Kate Murphy)

== Awards ==
Kangaroo Beach won the Animated Series Production of the Year at the Screen Producers Australia Awards 2022 and an Asian Academy Creative Award for Best Animated Series in 2022. It was nominated for an AACTA Award for Best Children's Series 2022.

== Episodes ==
Season	Episodes	Originally aired	
Season	Episodes	First aired	Last aired
1	26	25 January 2021	19 February 2021
Specials	4	1 January 2022	26 December 2024
2	25	23 January 2023	1 February 2023
3	24	20 January 2025	February 2025

=== Season 1 (2021) ===
No. overall	No. in season	Title	Directed by	Written by	Original release date	Viewers (millions)
1	1	"The Beach Race"	David Webster	Tim Bain	25 January 2021	?
The cadets are competing in an epic beach race and Gemma is determined to beat Pounce to the finish – until an emergency breaks out in the last leg.
2	2	"Pounce on Patrol"	David Webster	Tim Bain	26 January 2021	?
Wearing Bondi's cap, Pounce thinks he's chief lifeguard – but when Gemma and Neville need rescuing from a whale encounter, should he jump in, or alert a real lifeguard?
3	3	"Frizzy's Treasure Hunt"	David Webster	Tim Bain	27 January 2021	?
While scuba diving over the reef, Frizzy swims off from her buddy Big Trev in search of hidden treasure and becomes lost underwater.
4	4	"Island Campout"	David Webster	Tim Bain	28 January 2021	?
Camping out overnight on Boomerang Island with the cadets, Frizzy goes on a late night hunt for an alien koala.
5	5	"Sandy's Surf School"	David Webster	Tim Bain	29 January 2021	?
When Neville fails to learn how to surf as well as his friends, he builds a self-surfing surfboard – but it quickly lands him in hot water.
6	6	"Brave in the Waves"	David Webster	Charlotte Rose Hamlyn	30 January 2021	?
When Pounce pretends he's an expert at diving under big waves, his friends ask him to teach them how – and he soon finds himself in deep trouble.
7	7	"Neville's Shark Drone"	David Webster	Tim Bain	31 January 2021	?
When Neville builds a drone to help protect the beach from great white shark Charlene, it proves to be better than the lifeguards... almost.
8	8	"Rescue Roo"	David Webster	Tim Bain	1 February 2021	?
When Pounce sprains his thumper in the sand dunes, he's devastated to miss out on an exciting rescue day – but discovers that not every rescue is action-packed.
9	9	"Lighthouse Storm"	David Webster	Tim Bain	2 February 2021	?
Frizzy leads Bondi and the cadets on a dangerous journey into the hills to replace the lighthouse bulb during a storm.
10	10	"Frizzy's Big Show"	David Webster	Charlotte Rose Hamlyn	3 February 2021	?
When a TV crew shows up to film real life rescues on Kangaroo Beach, Frizzy vows to become world famous by being rescued.
11	11	"The Trophy Mystery"	David Webster	Charlotte Rose Hamlyn	4 February 2021	?
The cadets are tasked with babysitting toddler penguin Phillipa, but become distracted when a cheeky crab scurries off with a lifeguard trophy.
12	12	"Island Rescue"	David Webster	Tim Bain	5 February 2021	?
The cadets become stranded on Boomerang Island, but Neville vows to save the day with his backpack of supplies and emergency underpants.
13	13	"Ready Cadet Go!"	David Webster	Charlotte Rose Hamlyn	6 February 2021	?
The cadets compete in a series of lifeguard challenges, but Frizzy is distracted by the promise of shiny gold medals.
14	14	"The Big Swim"	David Webster	Lorin Clarke	7 February 2021	
When the cadets compete in the much-awaited Battle of the Boards, they must work together as a team to try and win a brand-new rescue board for the surf club.
15	15	"King Tide's Castle"	David Webster	Charlotte Rose Hamlyn	8 February 2021	?
Neville builds an epic sandcastle and makes himself king, but forgets that a king tide is forecast for Kangaroo Beach.
16	16	"Wild Waterslide"	David Webster	Charlotte Rose Hamlyn	9 February 2021	?
A giant inflatable waterslide is erected on the lagoon, but before they can ride, the cadets must teach the younger kids how to float.
17	17	"Stay Calm and Snorkel"	David Webster	Charlotte Rose Hamlyn	10 February 2021	?
Gemma learns how to stay calm in the water after panicking while snorkelling over the reef.
18	18	"The Dream Team"	David Webster	Tim Bain	11 February 2021	?
During an action-packed ride-along day with their lifeguard heroes, the cadets learn about working together as a team.
19	19	"Coach Koala"	David Webster	Tim Bain	12 February 2021	?
To help Big Trev pass the annual lifeguard fitness test, Frizzy coaches her grandfather with an early morning bootcamp.
20	20	"The Shark Prank"	David Webster	Simon Dodd & Tristan Dodd	13 February 2021	?
When Reef and Roadie don't get a part in Frizzy's water safety video, they create a cheeky shark prank instead – but it backfires badly.
21	21	"Heatwave"	David Webster	Simon Dodd & Tristan Dodd	14 February 2021	?
It's the hottest day of summer and while Gemma leads a dolphin rescue, Pounce is determined to prove kangaroos can beat the heat.
22	22	"Cadets vs Champs"	David Webster	Tim Bain	15 February 2021	?
It's Carnival Day at Kangaroo Beach with two teams competing in lifeguard games. But it's the young cadets versus the lifeguards – how can they possibly win against a stellar team of grown-up champions?
23	23	"Trash Pets"	David Webster	Charlotte Rose Hamlyn	16 February 2021	?
The cadets start a 'trash pet' craze on Kangaroo Beach, but when rubbish ends up in the sea, the lifeguards must rescue an entangled dolphin.
24	24	"The Lagoon Monster"	David Webster	Simon Dodd & Tristan Dodd	17 February 2021	?
The cadets try to catch a mysterious 'Seaweed Monster' they see stumbling about in the lagoon.
25	25	"Turtles Toddlers"	David Webster	Tim Bain & Charlotte Rose Hamlyn	18 February 2021	?
During a beach cricket match, Gemma finds a nest of turtle eggs and vows to protect them from seagulls, crabs and flying cricket balls.
26	26	"Cadets in Charge"	David Webster	Tim Bain	19 February 2021	?
When the cadets are put in charge of running the lifeguard club all by themselves, it proves to be the toughest – and most rewarding – day of their lives.

=== Specials (2022–24) ===
No. in season	Title	Directed by	Written by	Original release date	Viewers (millions)
1	"First Day of Summer"	Steve Moltzen	Tim Bain	1 January 2022	N/A
The cadets become stranded on a deserted beach and all seems lost. But Neville recalls another time they almost gave up, and we flashback to the first day of summer at Kangaroo Beach.
2	"Hoppy Christmas"	Steve Moltzen	Tim Bain & Charlotte Rose Hamlyn	5 December 2022	N/A
As the cadets prepare for the best Christmas ever on Kangaroo Beach, a homesick Ghërkinn realises he’s missing out on the beloved snowy Christmases he is used to at home. Hot chocolates, chestnuts roasting by the fire and snow angels are replaced with blue skies, sun, and sand. The cadets rally together to show Ghërkinn just how fun an Australian chrissy can be. But, an attempt by Ghërkinn to swim back home turns into a rescue mission and the cadets must think quickly to help bring him back to safety.
3	"Family Day"	Steve Moltzen	Tim Bain & Charlotte Rose Hamlyn	14 May 2023	N/A
It's Family Day and the young animal cadets are excited to welcome their parents for a day of fun-filled seaside activities on Kangaroo Beach.
4	"Mountain Mystery!"	Steve Moltzen	Tim Bain & Charlotte Rose Hamlyn	26 December 2024	N/A
The cadets head into the mountains for a daring rescue mission to save rescue dummy Dotty, but along the way, they make a surprising new friend and stumble upon a hunt for pirate treasure!

=== Season 2 (2023) ===
No. overall	No. in season	Title	Directed by	Written by	Original release date	Viewers (millions)
27	1	"Wallaby Waters"	Steve Moltzen	Charlotte Rose Hamlyn	23 January 2023	N/A
A celebrity quokka visits Kangaroo Beach to film an episode of the smash hit TV series Wallaby Waters.
28	2	"Splashdance"	Steve Moltzen	Tim Bain	24 January 2023	N/A
Gemma is inspired by Wanda and Big Trev's synchronised swimming routines and pushes herself to learn it.
29	3	"Neville and the Mermaid"	Steve Moltzen	Tim Bain & Charlotte Rose Hamlyn	25 January 2023	N/A
When Neville thinks he sees a mermaid in the lagoon, he sets out to find her.
30	4	"The Fun Float"	Steve Moltzen	Charlotte Rose Hamlyn	26 January 2023	N/A
Things get out of hand when Neville's plan for a peaceful day of floating on the river turns into a wild race.
31	5	"Jumping Joey"	Steve Moltzen	Tim Bain	27 January 2023	N/A
When Pounce competes against Reef & Roadie in a jumping contest, his friends worry he's putting himself in danger.
32	6	"Jurassic Beach"	Steve Moltzen	Tim Bain	28 January 2023	N/A
Gemma tries to impress her zoologist hero when dinosaur bones are discovered on Kangaroo Beach. But what sort of dinosaur do they belong to?
33	7	"Shipwrecked"	Steve Moltzen	Tim Bain	29 January 2023	N/A
Frizzy and Gemma investigate the mysterious disappearance of several boats in Kangaroo Beach's 'Barramundi Triangle'.
34	8	"Captain Frizzy"	Steve Moltzen	Tim Bain	30 January 2023	N/A
Frizzy sets sail around Boomerang Island in an effort to break Big Trev's record.
35	9	"Junior Junior Cadets"	Steve Moltzen	Tim Bain	31 January 2023	N/A
The cadets attempt to train four young kids as 'Junior Junior Cadets' - but their first lesson is a disaster!
36	10	"Phillipa's Pool Party"	Steve Moltzen	Tim Bain & Charlotte Rose Hamlyn	1 February 2023	N/A
The cadets are planning an epic surprise pool party for Phillipa's birthday but when things get out of hand, they forget the golden pool rule: keep the gate shut.
37	11	"The Grand Crabby Hotel"	Steve Moltzen	Sylvie van Dijk	TBA	TBD
The cadets build the Grand Crabby Hotel to protect rock pool sea creatures from the seagulls, but soon learn that despite being tough they shouldn't be moved.
38	12	"Bondi vs Sandy"	Steve Moltzen	Tim Bain	TBA	TBD
The cadets train Bondi and Sandy for their annual Iron Roo carnival - but how far are they willing to go to win?
39	13	"Really Real Rescues"	Steve Moltzen	Charlotte Rose Hamlyn	TBA	TBD
Really Real Rescues visits Kangaroo Beach to film a TV special about the cadets, but trying to look cool on camera lands them in hot water.
40	14	"Night Dive"	Steve Moltzen	Tim Bain	TBA	TBD
Worried about scuba diving for the first time, Neville runs off in the middle of the night.
41	15	"Doctor Wombat"	Steve Moltzen	Tim Bain	TBA	TBD
When multiple emergencies break out on a windy day at Kangaroo Beach, Neville offer help as an assistant medic. Meanwhile, Pounce learns how to kite surf.
42	16	"The Cave"	Steve Moltzen	Tim Bain	TBA	TBD
Pounce leads an adventure into a cave, but the cadets become trapped by the rising tide. Meanwhile, Frizzy goes in search of a volcano.
43	17	"King Kanga"	Steve Moltzen	Rebekka Schafferius	TBA	TBD
Kangaroo Beach legend, King Kanga, is back and ready to rule the beach. But the cadets soon learn that he has a very different lifeguarding approach.
44	18	"Master of the Waves"	Steve Moltzen	Charlotte Rose Hamlyn	TBA	TBD
The cadets host a 'do something new for you day' on Kangaroo Beach in an effort to help support Pounce while he learns a tricky new skill.
45	19	"Super Roo"	Steve Moltzen	Tim Bain	TBA	TBD
Pounce role-plays as legendary lifeguard Super Roo. Meanwhile, Frizzy helps Wanda make a Big Thing.
46	20	"Canoe Adventure"	Steve Moltzen	Lorin Clarke	TBA	TBD
The cadets hit the river with their canoes for a picnic day. But while Frizzy and Gemma cannot paddle in sync, Neville and Pounce find themselves in hot water.
47	21	"Girl Who Cried Jellyfish"	Steve Moltzen	Tim Bain	TBA	TBD
Frizzy gets herself in trouble when she cries 'shark'. Then when she spots real danger headed for Kangaroo Beach, no one believes her.
48	22	"Surf Club Sleepover"	Steve Moltzen	Tim Bain & Lorin Clarke	TBA	TBD
Gemma hosts a 'No Sleep Sleepover' full of fun and games, but can the tired cadets make it until midnight?
