= Caoilinn Springall =

Irish child actress (born 2012)

- Born: 14 May 2012 (age 14)
- Occupations: Actress; model
- Years active: 2019–present

Caoilinn Springall (born 14 May 2012) is an Irish child actress. Her films include The Midnight Sky (2020) and The Beast Within (2024). On television, she is known for her role in the Amazon Prime series Citadel (2023).

== Career ==
Springall made her feature film debut in the 2020 Netflix science-fiction drama, The Midnight Sky, directed by George Clooney. In the film, she played the role of Iris, a mysterious young girl who forms a bond with Clooney's character, Augustine Lofthouse. Her performance was widely praised for its emotional depth and maturity, especially considering her young age.

Following this, Springall secured a main role in the television series Citadel, and a recurring role as Little Girl in the British psychological horror film Stopmotion.

She starred in Paul W. S. Anderson's fantasy-adventure film In the Lost Lands, alongside Dave Bautista and Deirdre Mullins, which was released in 2025. Springall appeared in the 2024 Doctor Who episode "Boom", playing Splice Alison Vater.

In May 2023, it was announced that Caoilinn Springall had joined the cast of The Beast Within.

== Filmography ==
=== Film ===
Year	Title	Role	Notes	Ref.
2020	The Midnight Sky	Iris		
2023	Stopmotion	Little Girl		
2024	The Beast Within	Willo		
2025	In the Lost Lands	Young Girl		

=== Television ===
Year	Title	Role	Notes	Ref.
2023–present	Citadel	Hendrix Conroy	Main role	
2024	Doctor Who	Splice Alison Vater	Episode: "Boom"	

== Awards and nominations ==
Year	Award	Category	Work	Result	Ref
2021	Critics' Choice Awards	Best Young Actor/Actress	The Midnight Sky	Nominated	
