= Marcus Fraser (actor) =

British actor

- Education: Bristol Old Vic Theatre School
- Occupation: Actor
- Years active: 2016-present
- Television: Foundation, Robin Hood

Marcus Fraser is a British stage, television, and film actor.

== Career ==
Fraser trained at the Bristol Old Vic Theatre School, graduating in 2015. The following year, he made his professional debut on stage in the Kenneth Branagh Theatre Company comedy drama The Painkiller, alongside Kenneth Branagh and Rob Brydon at the Garrick Theatre in London's West End.

Fraser could be as Jabba in Steve McQueen film Lovers Rock (2020), part of McQueen's Small Axe anthology. Fraser portrayed Calvin Thompson, husband of Marcella Claxton, in ITV true-crime detective series The Long Shadow. He also appeared in Stath Lets Flats and The Sandman.

Fraser had television roles in Foundation for Apple TV+, as well as British crime comedy drama The Outlaws and British thriller series The Capture. His film roles include portraying Gawain in Transformers: The Last Knight (2017) and Arthur's Whisky (2024). He also appeared in 2022 film I Used to Be Famous alongside Ed Skrein.

In 2025, Fraser could be seen as the character Little John in MGM+ television series Robin Hood.

== Partial filmography ==
Year	Title	Role	Notes
2017	Transformers: The Last Knight	Gawain	Film
2018	Stath Lets Flats	Don	1 episode
2019	The Capture	Mikey	5 episodes
2020	Lovers Rock	Jabba	Part of the Small Axe anthology
2021–2022	The Outlaws	Souljah	7 episodes
2022	The Sandman	Aglieth	1 episode
2022	I Used to Be Famous	Mike	Film
2023	The Long Shadow	Calvin Thompson	3 episodes
2023	The Book of Clarence	Matthew	Film
2024	Arthur's Whisky	Nathan	Film
2025	Foundation	Vandagh	5 episodes
2025	Robin Hood	Little John	Main cast
2026	Run Away	Rocco	3 episodes
