= The Beast Within (2024 film) =

2024 Horror film

- Theatrical release poster
- Directed by: Alexander J. Farrell
- Written by: Greer Ellison
- Screenplay by: Greer Ellison; Alexander J. Farrell
- Produced by: Merlin Merton; Martin Owen; Karl Hall; Ryan Hamilton; Sebastian Street; Jack Christian
- Starring: Kit Harington; Ashleigh Cummings; James Cosmo; Martina McClements
- Cinematography: Daniel Katz
- Edited by: Matthieu Laclau
- Music by: Jack Halama; Nathan W Klein
- Production companies: Filmology Finance; Future Artists Entertainment; Paradox House
- Distributed by: Signature Entertainment
- Release date: July 26, 2024
- Running time: 98 minutes
- Country: United Kingdom
- Language: English
- Box office: $51,860

The Beast Within is a 2024 British mystery horror-thriller film directed by Alexander J. Farrell, co-written by Greer Ellison, Alexander J. Farrell, and produced by Merlin Merton, Martin Owen, Karl Hall, Ryan Hamilton and Jack Christian. The film stars Kit Harington, Ashleigh Cummings, James Cosmo, and Caoilinn Springall. It was released on 26 July 2024.

== Synopsis ==
"After a series of strange events leads her to question her family’s isolated life on a fortified compound deep in the English wilds, 10-year-old Willow follows her parents on one of their secret late-night treks to the heart of the ancient forest. But upon witnessing her father undergo a terrible transformation, she too becomes ensnared by the dark ancestral secret they’ve tried so desperately to conceal."

== Cast ==
- Kit Harington as Noah
- Ashleigh Cummings as Imogen
- James Cosmo as Waylon
- Caoilinn Springall as Willow
- Ian Giles as William
- Martina McClements as Great Grandmother
- Adam Basil as a townsperson

== Production ==
The Beast Within was filmed in Harewood Woods and Castle in West Yorkshire England, chosen for its atmospheric and eerie setting with its Structures dating back to the 14th century. The film's director, Alexander J. Farrell, aimed to create a sense of dread and suspense, using practical effects and minimal CGI to bring the beast to life. The script, written by Greer Ellison, draws inspiration from classic horror films and folklore, blending elements of mystery and psychological terror.

=== Filming ===
Principal photography for The Beast Within began in Yorkshire, England with the working title "What Remains of Us" in May 2023 and continued over several months.

== Release and reception ==
The Beast Within premiered at the Fantasia Film Festival on 26 July 2024, where it received positive reviews for its suspenseful storytelling and effective use of practical effects. Critics praised the performances of the lead actors, particularly Kit Harington's portrayal of Noah and Caoilinn Springall's role as Willow.

Tyler Nichols of JoBlo.com praised Caoillinn Springall's performance, which is as impressive. Aaron B. Peterson of The Hollywood Outsider gave the film 2/5 stars. Film pundit, John Dotson of The Cosmic Circus described the film as a Gothic Tale of Childhood Trauma.

On the review aggregator website Rotten Tomatoes, The Beast Within holds an approval rating of 40% based on 42 reviews, with an average rating of 5.3/10. The site's consensus states: "Somewhere inside The Beast Within lies a clever riff on the werewolf genre, but it struggles to claw through a lack of incident and specificity."

== Box office ==
The Beast Within earned $51,860 in its opening week in the US.

== Soundtrack ==
The film's soundtrack, composed by Jack Halama and Nathan W Klein, features an eerie and haunting score that enhances the film's suspenseful atmosphere. The soundtrack was released on digital streaming platforms and received critical acclaim for its contribution to the film's mood and tone.
