= Ishana Night Shyamalan =

American filmmaker

- Born: November 19, 1999 (age 26); Bryn Mawr, Pennsylvania, U.S.
- Education: New York University
- Occupations: Film director; screenwriter; producer
- Years active: 2020–present
- Father: M. Night Shyamalan
- Relatives: Saleka Shyamalan (sister)

Ishana Night Shyamalan (born 1999 or 2000) is an American filmmaker. She made her directorial debut with the horror film The Watchers (2024), which was produced by her father, M. Night Shyamalan.

== Early life ==
Shyamalan was born and raised in Bryn Mawr, Pennsylvania. She is a daughter of filmmaker M. Night Shyamalan. She and her sisters grew up watching horror films. She graduated from the New York University Tisch School of the Arts.

== Career ==
Ishana frequently collaborates with her older sister Saleka, and has directed a majority of her music videos.

Shyamalan directed and wrote several episodes of the horror TV series Servant, for which her father was the showrunner. Shyamalan also directed the second unit on her father's films Old (2021) and Knock at the Cabin (2023).

In February 2023, it was announced that Shyamalan would be making her directorial debut with the horror film The Watchers. The film was produced by her father and released on June 7, 2024, grossing $33 million worldwide.

== Filmography ==
=== Film ===
Year	Title	Director	Writer	Other	Notes
2021	Old	No	No	Yes	Second unit director
2023	Knock at the Cabin	No	No	Yes	Second unit director
2024	The Watchers	Yes	Yes	No	Directorial debut

=== Television ===
Year	Title	Director	Writer	Producer	Notes
2021–23	Servant	Yes	Yes	Yes	Writer (10 episodes), director (6 episodes)

=== Music videos ===
Year	Title	Artist
2020	"Clarity"	Saleka
2020	"Mr. Incredible"	Saleka
2021	"Grafitti"	Saleka
2022	"Seance"	Saleka
