= Run Rabbit Run (film) =

2023 film by Daina Reid

- Release poster
- Directed by: Daina Reid
- Written by: Hannah Kent
- Produced by: Anna McLeish; Naomi Mulholland; Sarah Shaw
- Starring: Sarah Snook; Lily LaTorre; Damon Herriman; Greta Scacchi
- Cinematography: Bonnie Elliott
- Edited by: Nick Meyers
- Music by: Mark Bradshaw; Marcus Whale
- Production companies: XYZ Films; Carver Films
- Distributed by: Netflix
- Release dates: 19 January 2023 (Sundance); 28 June 2023 (Netflix)
- Running time: 100 minutes
- Country: Australia
- Language: English

Run Rabbit Run is a 2023 Australian psychological horror film directed by Daina Reid and written by Hannah Kent. It stars Sarah Snook, Lily LaTorre, Damon Herriman and Greta Scacchi. The film premiered at the Sundance Film Festival on 19 January 2023 and was released on Netflix on 28 June 2023.

== Plot ==
Sarah, a divorced fertility doctor, celebrates her daughter Mia's seventh birthday. The pair find a rabbit at their house, which Mia grows attached to. The night of Mia's birthday, they are joined by Mia's father Peter, his new partner Denise, and Denise's three-year-old son Toby. While playing, Mia screams when Toby hits her on the head. Sarah angrily rebukes Toby and Denise, but Denise smooths things over by asking if Mia wants cake. Later at night, Sarah attempts to send the rabbit over their garden wall, but it bites her. Sarah realises that Mia saw her try to get rid of the rabbit.

Starting the next morning, Mia's behaviour grows strange. She becomes intermittently unresponsive, and starts wearing a self-made rabbit mask that she refuses to take off when Sarah asks. At school, Mia hides in a playground tube in fear, but denies that she is being bullied. Mia says she misses her grandmother, Joan, whom Sarah is estranged from and whom Mia has never met.

When Mia asks for family photos to make a family tree, Sarah finds a childhood photo of herself and her younger sister; Mia claims to be in the photo. While Mia's behaviour becomes more erratic, Sarah starts hallucinating, her nightmares grow more intense, and the rabbit bite on her hand becomes infected.

Due to Mia's insistence on seeing Joan, Sarah takes her to visit the assisted living home where she lives. Joan, who has dementia, refers to Mia as "Alice", which Mia reacts strongly to. Sarah forcefully separates the two, and injures Mia's hand when trying to control her. Afterward, Sarah hurts her own hand to mirror the injury. Sarah learns from Mia's schoolteacher that there are disturbing drawings on the underside of Mia's homework, and Sarah realises that all of Mia's artwork at home has similar drawings.

Sarah questions Mia about her behaviour, and Mia declares that she is Alice. At Peter's suggestion, Sarah takes Mia to Sarah's childhood home, and tells her about her sister Alice, who went missing when Alice was seven. Sarah is angered when Mia continues to say that she is Alice, and claims that Sarah bullied her. Sarah's hallucinations worsen, and she unintentionally cuts Mia with scissors.

Sarah hallucinates her childhood memory of Alice, confusing her sister with Mia. As a child, Sarah locked Alice in the shed; after Sarah released her, Alice choked her, Sarah hit her head with a steel trap, and when Alice started screaming, Sarah pushed her off the cliff to her death.

Peter arrives at the house, where the family photos have been smashed and Sarah has been drawing on the floor in a fugue state. The pair search for Mia, all while Sarah is hallucinating about Alice drowning. They find her in a bush. Sarah goes to the nursing home to talk to her mother, Joan, and admits Alice is dead. She goes back to her childhood home and apologises to Mia/Alice, that she hurt Alice and lied about Alice running away. Mia calls her a monster. The next morning, Sarah searches for Mia and, looking out the window, sees Mia and Alice holding hands while walking to the cliff.

== Cast ==
- Sarah Snook as Sarah
- Lily LaTorre as Mia
- Damon Herriman as Peter
- Greta Scacchi as Joan
- Sunny Whelan as Alice
- Naomi Rukavina as Denise
- Shabana Azeez as Nowa
- Trevor Jamieson as Sandy
- Georgina Naidu as Andrea

== Production ==
Australian author Hannah Kent had been thinking of writing a novel based on a true story about a Scottish child who remembered a past life, and she started researching similar incidences. When film producers Anna McLeish and Sarah Shaw, of Carver Films, asked if she had any ideas for a screenplay, she suggested using such a storyline as a kind of psychological drama. Kent was interested to imagine "what it would be like to be a parent of this child... in the mother and the alienation she would feel when a child didn't want her". The film was later developed in the horror genre.

In June 2020, Elisabeth Moss was attached to the project with XYZ Films and Daina Reid directing. STXfilms was distributing the film. Moss had previously worked with Reid on the television series The Handmaid's Tale. In December 2021, Snook was announced as on board the project after Moss had to pull out due to scheduling issues as STXfilms was no longer involved in the film. The following month Damon Herriman and Greta Scacchi were added to the cast, with filming starting in the same week.

Principal photography took place on location in Waikerie, in the Riverland region of South Australia, and Melbourne, Victoria. The film was produced by Anna McLeish and Sarah Shaw for Carver Films. XYZ Films co-financed the film, also handling worldwide sales, with additional finance from Screen Australia, South Australian Film Corporation, VicScreen, and Filmology Finance.

== Release ==
Run Rabbit Run premiered at the Sundance Film Festival on 19 January 2023. Shortly after, Netflix acquired distribution rights to the film in all territories excluding the Benelux, Portugal, Eastern Europe, the Middle East, Latin America, Hong Kong, India, Indonesia, the Philippines, the Nordics and Taiwan, releasing it on 28 June 2023.

== Reception ==
On the review aggregator website Rotten Tomatoes, the film holds an approval rating of 38% based on 100 reviews, with an average rating of 4.8/10. The website's critics consensus reads, "Run Rabbit Run boasts some powerhouse performances, but they're largely overwhelmed by a thin plot and overreliance on stale horror tropes." On Metacritic, it has a weighted average score of 52 out of 100 based on 20 critics, indicating "mixed or average reviews".

Leila Latif of Sight and Sound wrote, "For those not particularly steeped in the horror highlights of the past decade, Run Rabbit Run may make for a worthwhile watch; the direction, script and sun-dappled camerawork are all competent, bordering on elegant. But for genre fans, every beat is so familiar that the film feels like the ungodly creation of an AI that was tasked with blending Repulsion (1965), The Babadook (2014), Relic (2020), Hereditary and even last year's Sundance Grand Jury Prize winner Nanny." Jourdain Searles of The Hollywood Reporter also noted the film's similarities to The Babadook and Hereditary. Searles said that the film was "moody and atmospheric" and "easily builds tension and dread", but "keeps hinting at depth that never comes. Director Daina Reid takes us through all the similar motions–hallucinations, mysterious injuries, bursts of violence in the most generic way possible. Even the symbolic white rabbit that appears throughout the film inspires neither interest nor dread."

IndieWire's Ryan Lattanzio gave the film a C grade, calling it "a pile-up of banal horror tropes", but praised the film's cinematography. He added, "The saving grace that makes Rabbit maybe worth seeing is an unkempt Sarah Snook, who goes into full, well, Babadook and Black Swan and even Repulsion territory in the movie's final throwdown."

Ed Gibbs of The Times gave the film 3/4 stars, writing, "Reid's handsomely shot film takes its time building to its inevitable climax, and some of the more familiar genre tropes feel a little on the nose. But Snook carries the piece with gusto". Justin Chang of the Los Angeles Times said that the film "delivers a succession of initially effective frights before devolving into Run Rabbit Run Rinse Repeat", but added, "I was glad to see it in a packed Park City house regardless, happily sandwiched between two friends whose nervous giggles, along with Snook's characteristically arresting performance, were more than enough to keep me in my seat." Damon Wise from Deadline Hollywood described the film as "effective but perhaps overlong" but with "a poetic resonance" that makes for a "nightmarish essay on action and consequence, not to mention the isolation and travails that come with single parenthood". Wise said the film "deliberately overlap[s] notions of reality and abstraction", and praised LaTorre and Snook's performances.

In addition to critical commentary, streaming performance metrics indicate that the film drew significant audience interest on Netflix during its release period.

According to weekly viewership data reported by Media Play News, based on measurements from research firm PlumResearch, Run Rabbit Run generated 4.8 million unique viewers and 5.9 million hours watched on Netflix during the week of 26 June 26 to 2 July 2023.

== Awards ==
Sarah Snook was recognised at the AACTA Awards, receiving a Best Lead Actress in Film nomination.

== See also ==
- Cinema of Australia
