= Classified (2024 film) =

- Film poster
- Directed by: Roel Reiné
- Written by: Bob DeRosa
- Produced by: Ellen Wander; Jordan Dykstra; Gabriel Georgiev
- Starring: Aaron Eckhart; Tim Roth; Abigail Breslin
- Cinematography: Roel Reiné
- Edited by: Radu Ion
- Music by: Roel Reiné
- Production companies: Film Bridge International; Filmology Finance; Great Point Media
- Distributed by: Saban Films
- Release date: October 22, 2024
- Running time: 105 minutes
- Country: United States
- Language: English

Classified is a 2024 American action thriller film directed by Roel Reiné, written by Bob DeRosa, and starring Aaron Eckhart, Tim Roth and Abigail Breslin.

Classified was released on video on demand by Sony Pictures Home Entertainment on October 22, 2024. The film received generally poor critical reception.

== Plot ==
The film opens by introducing Evan Shaw, a highly skilled and solitary CIA field operative who has spent over two decades carrying out covert assassinations around the world. He believes he is still an active agent, receiving legitimate missions through coded messages hidden in the “Help Wanted” section of newspapers—a method he has followed without question for years.

Shaw is portrayed as disciplined, methodical, and emotionally closed off, shaped by a lifetime of secrecy and obedience. He carries out his assignments efficiently, never questioning their purpose or origin.

The story shifts when Kacey Walker, an MI6 analyst, begins tracking Shaw. At first, she appears to be an intelligence officer investigating a string of assassinations connected by an unusual pattern. When she finally confronts Shaw, she challenges his belief that he’s still working for the CIA and warns him that something about his missions is wrong.

Shaw initially dismisses her claims, insisting that his handler and division are still active. However, Kacey presents evidence suggesting that his CIA handler, Kevin Angler, has been dead for years and that the CIA unit Shaw believes he serves was shut down long ago.

As Shaw starts to notice inconsistencies and is targeted by unknown attackers, it becomes clear that he is being watched and manipulated. Forced to rely on Kacey’s intelligence skills, the two reluctantly work together to uncover who is really behind Shaw’s assignments.

During their investigation, Shaw learns that his missions have been orchestrated through the newspaper codes by a private intelligence operation, exploiting his loyalty and isolation to carry out targeted killings that serve corporate and political interests rather than national security.

Partway through the film, it is revealed that Kacey is actually Shaw’s estranged daughter, a truth she has kept hidden to maintain her objectivity and safety. The revelation reframes their partnership, adding emotional weight as Shaw confronts the personal cost of the life he chose.

With the full scope of the conspiracy exposed, Shaw realizes he has been unknowingly used as a weapon for years. Struggling with guilt and anger, he decides to bring the operation to an end.

In the final act, Shaw confronts and kills the mastermind behind the scheme, dismantling the system that controlled his missions. The film concludes with Shaw stepping away from the assassin’s life and beginning the difficult process of rebuilding a relationship with Kacey, finally reclaiming control over his future.

== Cast ==
- Aaron Eckhart as Evan Shaw
- Tim Roth as Kevin Angler
- Abigail Breslin as Kacey Walker

== Production ==
The film was shot in Malta in April 2023. In May 2023, it was announced that filming wrapped.

=== Controversy ===
Breslin has alleged that Eckhart was “aggressive” to work with on the set, which led to her filing a complaint against him to SAG-AFTRA and the filmmakers filing a lawsuit against her.

== Release ==
Classified was released on video on demand by Sony Pictures Home Entertainment on October 22, 2024.

== Reception ==
Mary Kassel of Screen Rant rated the film a 3 out of 10. Mark Keizer of MovieWeb rated the film a 2 out of 5. Leslie Felperin of The Guardian also rated the film 2 out of 5, stating it was "shonky" with "shockingly bad" dialogue.
