= The Infernal Machine (2022 film) =

American feature film

- Theatrical release poster
- Directed by: Andrew Hunt
- Written by: Andrew Hunt
- Based on: "The Hilly Earth Society," written by Louis Kornfeld and produced by Jonathan Mitchell for The Truth podcast
- Produced by: Spencer McLaren; Julian Hicks; Lionel Hicks
- Starring: Guy Pearce; Alice Eve; Jeremy Davies; Alex Pettyfer
- Cinematography: Sara Deane
- Edited by: Jeremy Wanek
- Music by: Nathaniel Levisay
- Production companies: McLaren House; Filmology Finance; Moviebox Studio; Odin's Eye Entertainment; Liquid Noise
- Distributed by: Paramount Pictures
- Release dates: September 23, 2022 (United States); December 2, 2022 (United Kingdom)
- Running time: 111 minutes
- Countries: United Kingdom; United States
- Language: English

The Infernal Machine is a 2022 psychological mystery thriller film written and directed by Andrew Hunt. It is based on a story written by Louis Kornfeld. The film stars Guy Pearce, Alice Eve, Jeremy Davies, and Alex Pettyfer.

The Infernal Machine was released in the United States on September 23, 2022, and in the United Kingdom on December 2, 2022, by Paramount Pictures.

== Synopsis ==
Bruce Cogburn, a reclusive and controversial author of the famed book The Infernal Machine, is drawn out of hiding when he begins to receive endless letters from an obsessive fan. Cogburn has lived in self-imposed isolation for 25 years in the American southwest. He was driven there in 1981 by the actions of a young man who began shooting in a Knoxville, Tennessee university killing 13 people and blaming his action on Cogburn's only book. Then letters show up in his post office box from William DuKent, a writer seeking an interview with him. Cogburn travels 45 minutes to the nearest phone booth to leave increasingly threatening phone messages for DuKent demanding that the letters stop.

Cogburn's paranoia and alcohol consumption grow. He goes to meet the shooter, Dwight Tufford, in prison using a fake name. Tufford manages to escape from prison then arrives at Cogburn's house where Cogburn manages to kill him.

It is revealed that Cogburn had plagiarised the book from one of his students from his time teaching creative writing. The student in question, Elijah Barrett, suffered a mental breakdown upon completion of the book and set himself on fire, placing him in a coma. Cogburn himself had received multiple rejections from publishers for his own writing, which they deemed mediocre and uninspiring, so he published Barrett's book as his own once he heard that the student's family were turning off his life support. Barrett survived however, and, in the present day, writes a second book, The Divine Apostate, under Cogburn's name. After forcing a confrontation with Cogburn, Barrett attempts to kill both himself and Cogburn in a fire, but Cogburn crawls wounded from the blaze and survives. He returns home and posts a letter to his agent confessing that he was not the true author of The Infernal Machine, and that he had stolen it.

== Cast ==
- Guy Pearce as Bruce Cogburn
- Alice Eve as Officer Laura Higgins
- Alex Pettyfer as Dwight Tufford
- Jeremy Davies as Elijah Barrett

== Production ==
Filming took place over five weeks in Algarve, Portugal, in Portugal’s Moviebox Studios, and on locations in and around the town of Loulé. Paramount Pictures acquired worldwide rights to The Infernal Machine in October 2021. The film was financed by executive producer Jack Christian's financing firm, Filmology Finance.

== Reception ==
=== Critical response ===
On Rotten Tomatoes, 46% of 13 critics gave the film a positive review, with an average rating of 5.5/10.
