= Tim Bain =

British-Australian writer (born 1978)

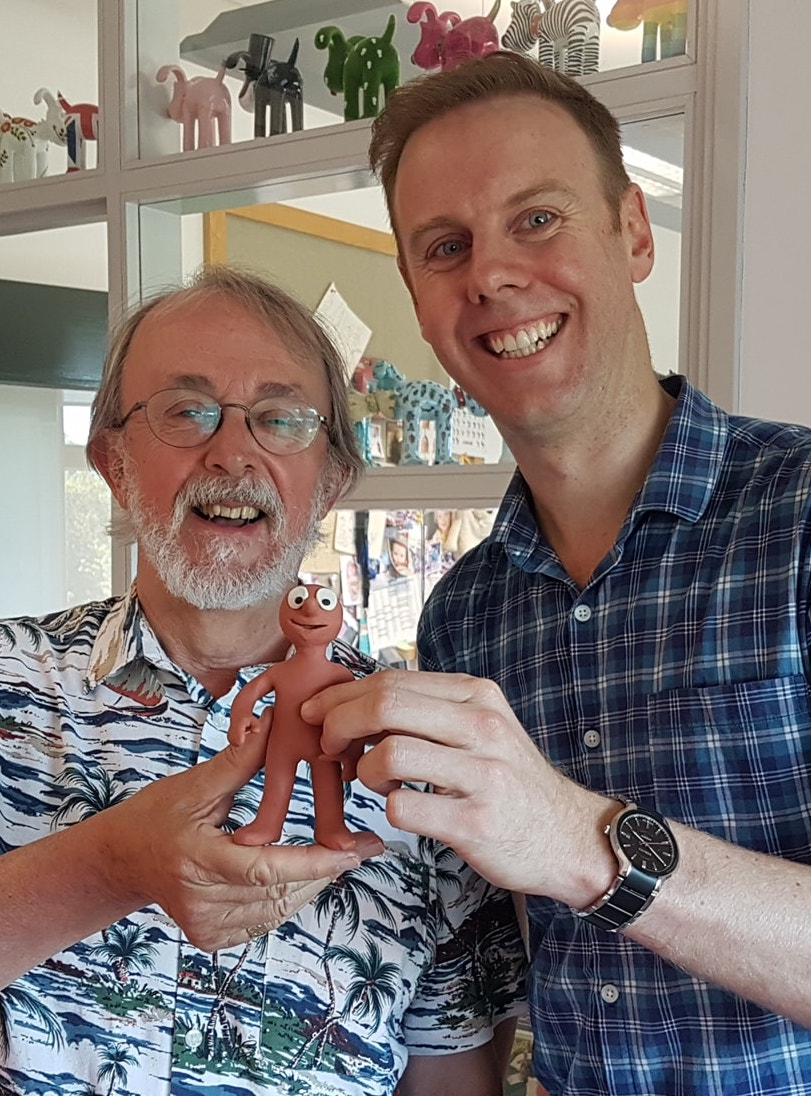
- Bain (right) with Peter Lord at Aardman Animations in 2018
- Born: Timothy Bain; 28 November 1978 (age 47); Melbourne, Victoria, Australia
- Occupations: Television writer, director, producer, voice actor
- Writing career
- Years active: 2000–present
- Website: www.timbain.com

Timothy Bain (born 28 November 1978) is a British-Australian writer. He is known for writing comedy, children's and animated series for television. He is the creator of action-comedy series Kangaroo Beach, animated family sitcom Let's Go, Bananas!, and action-adventure series Knee High Spies.

Bain has also written for comedy series including Aardman Animations Epic Adventures of Morph, The Rubbish World of Dave Spud, Rove and The Wedge. His children's series credits include Bluey, PJ Masks, Bob the Builder, Fireman Sam and Thomas & Friends.

== Acting ==
Bain has voiced characters in Go Jetters, Love Monster and in Thomas & Friends series 22–24, playing a variety of humans, trains and buses.

== Awards ==
Bain won Best Children's Episode at the British Writers Guild Awards 2018 and Best Animation at the Australian Writers Guild Awards 2017 for his Counterfeit Cat script "Room of Panic".

Kangaroo Beach won the 2022 Screen Producers Australia Animated Series Production of the Year Award and was nominated for a 2021 AACTA Award.

Tooned 50, starring the voices of Alexander Armstrong and Brian Cox, and Formula-1 champions Jenson Button, Emerson Fittipaldi, Mika Häkkinen and Alain Prost, won a Gold Eurobest Award in 2013 and a Gold Lovie Award.

== Musicals ==
Bain has written several high school musical-comedies, You're History!, Lucky, RetroActive and High School Spoof-ical. They are published by Maverick Musicals and have been performed across Australia, New Zealand, United Kingdom, the United States, Japan and South Africa.

== Short films ==
Bain's short animated films Arctic Adventure (2000) and Kidd Kelly (2003) featured the voices of Eric Bana, Sigrid Thornton, John Clarke, Angus Sampson, Dave Hughes, Kim Gyngell and Judith Lucy. They have screened at festivals including the St Kilda Film Festival, Melbourne International Comedy Festival, Melbourne International Animation Festival and the Massachusetts Children's Film Festival.
