= M. Night Shyamalan filmography =

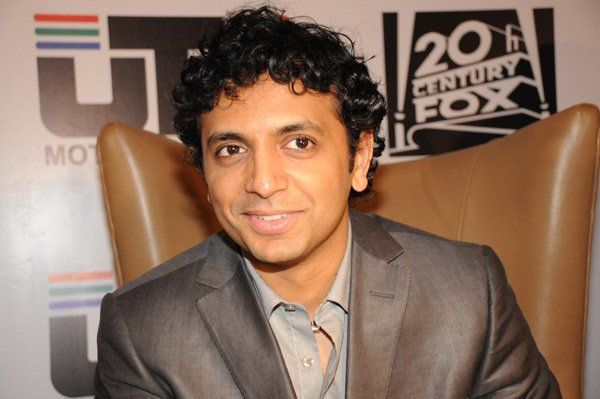
Shyamalan at a press conference for The Happening in 2008

Indian-American filmmaker M. Night Shyamalan wrote, directed, and starred in his first project, the independent film Praying with Anger, while he was a student at New York University; inspired by his cultural upbringing, the movie was released in 1992 and earned him praise at film festivals. His next film, the comedy-drama Wide Awake about a grieving child struggling with his Catholic faith, was completed in 1995 but shelved by the studio Miramax until 1998. During this period, he did an uncredited rewrite of the script for the romantic-comedy She's All That that allegedly "got the movie green-lit" and co-wrote the live-action/animated film Stuart Little (both released in 1999). Also in 1999, he wrote and directed the supernatural drama The Sixth Sense, starring Bruce Willis as a child psychologist whose patient claims he can see and talk to the dead. The three projects were commercially successful, with The Sixth Sense becoming the second-highest grossing film of the year and earning Shyamalan international attention and name recognition from critics and audiences and Academy Award nominations for Best Director and Best Original Screenplay.

He reunited with Willis on the thriller Unbreakable about a seemingly average man, David Dunn, who learns he has superhuman abilities. The film co-starred Samuel L. Jackson and was released in 2000. Like Unbreakable, his science-fiction thriller Signs (2002) and period drama The Village (2004) found financial success and solidified him as a filmmaker known for his twist endings and cameo appearances. The next decade, however, saw a series of critical misfires with Lady in the Water (2006), The Happening (2008), and the higher-budgeted The Last Airbender (2010) and After Earth (2013). In 2015, he had a career resurgence after partnering with Universal Pictures on the found footage horror film The Visit, which made $98.5 million on a $5 million budget he self-funded by taking out a loan against his estate. He worked with Universal again on Split (2016) and its sequel Glass (2019), which with Unbreakable comprise the Eastrail 177 Trilogy; Old (2021); and Knock at the Cabin (2023). He partnered with Warner Bros. Pictures for his latest films: Trap (2024) and Remain (2026). Since The Visit, he has partly self-financed his films. In television, he directed the pilot of Wayward Pines (2015) and showran Servant (2019–2023).

== Films ==
M. Night Shyamalan's film credits
Year	Title	Director	Writer	Producer	Notes	Ref(s)
1992	Praying with Anger	Yes	Yes	Yes	Student film	
1998	Wide Awake	Yes	Yes	No		
1999	The Sixth Sense	Yes	Yes	No		
1999	Stuart Little	No	Yes	No	Co-written with Greg Brooker	
2000	Unbreakable	Yes	Yes	Yes		
2002	Signs	Yes	Yes	Yes		
2004	The Village	Yes	Yes	Yes		
2006	Lady in the Water	Yes	Yes	Yes		
2008	The Happening	Yes	Yes	Yes		
2010	The Last Airbender	Yes	Yes	Yes		
2010	Devil	No	Story	Yes		
2013	After Earth	Yes	Yes	Yes	Co-written with Gary Whitta	
2015	The Visit	Yes	Yes	Yes		
2016	Split	Yes	Yes	Yes		
2019	Glass	Yes	Yes	Yes		
2021	Old	Yes	Yes	Yes		
2023	Knock at the Cabin	Yes	Yes	Yes	Co-written with Steve Desmond and Michael Sherman	
2024	Trap	Yes	Yes	Yes		
2026	Remain	Yes	Yes	Yes	Story co-written with Nicholas Sparks	

Miscellaneous credits

Year	Title	Credit	Ref(s)
1999	She's All That	Uncredited rewrite	
2024	The Watchers	Producer	
2024	Caddo Lake	Producer	

== Television ==
M. Night Shyamalan's television credits
Year	Title	Director	Executive producer	Notes	Ref(s)
2015–16	Wayward Pines	Yes	Yes	Episode: "Where Paradise Is Home"	
2019–23	Servant	Yes	Yes	Episodes: "Reborn", "Jericho", "2:00", "Donkey", "Awake"	

== Music videos ==
M. Night Shyamalan's music video credits
Year	Title	Director	Producer	Artist	Ref(s)
2016	"Rise Up"	Yes	No	Andra Day	
2021	"The Sky Cries"	Yes	Yes	Saleka	

== Acting credits ==
M. Night Shyamalan's acting credits
Year	Title	Role	Notes	Ref(s)
1992	Praying with Anger	Dev Raman		
1999	The Sixth Sense	Dr. Hill		
2000	Unbreakable	Jai	Credited as "stadium drug dealer"	
2002	Signs	Ray Reddy		
2004	The Village	Jay	Credited as "guard at desk"	
2006	Lady in the Water	Vick Ran		
2007	Entourage	Himself	Episode: "Sorry, Harvey"	
2008	The Happening	Joey	A voice role played on a phone call made by a character	
2010	The Last Airbender	Firebender at Earth Prison Camp	Uncredited	
2016	Split	Jai		
2019	Glass	Jai		
2019	Servant	Delivery man	Episode: "Reborn" uncredited	
2019, 2020	This Is Us	Himself	Episodes: "The Pool: Part Two" and "A Hell of a Week: Part Two"	
2021	Old	Theo	Credited as "hotel van driver"	
2023	Knock at the Cabin	Infomercial host		
2024	Trap	Spotter	Lady Raven's uncle	
2026	Remain	Nash		

== Critical and public response ==
Critical and public response to films from M. Night Shyamalan
Year	Film	Rotten Tomatoes	Metacritic	CinemaScore
1992	Praying with Anger	—N/a	—N/a	—N/a
1998	Wide Awake	45% (33 reviews)	—N/a	—N/a
1999	The Sixth Sense	86% (158 reviews)	64 (35 reviews)	A–
2000	Unbreakable	71% (174 reviews)	62 (31 reviews)	C
2002	Signs	76% (239 reviews)	59 (36 reviews)	B
2004	The Village	43% (218 reviews)	44 (40 reviews)	C
2006	Lady in the Water	25% (212 reviews)	36 (36 reviews)	B–
2008	The Happening	17% (185 reviews)	34 (38 reviews)	D
2010	The Last Airbender	5% (192 reviews)	20 (33 reviews)	C
2013	After Earth	12% (213 reviews)	33 (41 reviews)	B
2015	The Visit	68% (229 reviews)	55 (34 reviews)	B–
2016	Split	79% (311 reviews)	62 (47 reviews)	B+
2019	Glass	37% (398 reviews)	43 (53 reviews)	B
2021	Old	50% (313 reviews)	55 (52 reviews)	C+
2023	Knock at the Cabin	67% (237 reviews)	63 (54 reviews)	C
2024	Trap	57% (249 reviews)	52 (46 reviews)	C+

== See also ==
- List of awards and nominations received by M. Night Shyamalan
