= List of awards and nominations received by M. Night Shyamalan =

M. Night Shyamalan awards and nominations
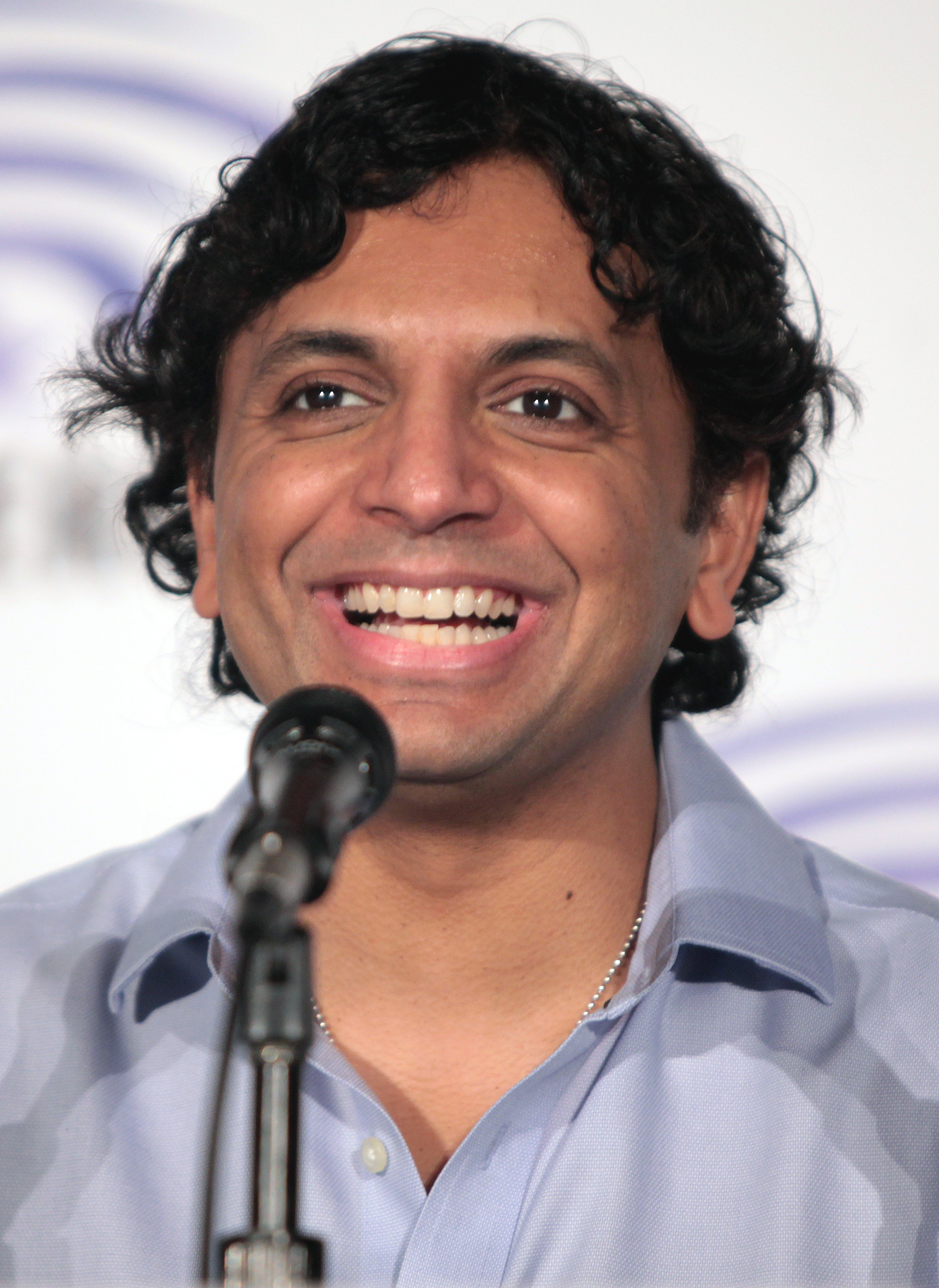
- Shyamalan in 2011
Awards and nominations
Award	Wins	Nominations
Academy Awards	0	2
BAFTA Awards	0	2
Golden Globe Awards	0	1
Golden Raspberry Awards	5	15

Totals (Note: Certain award groups do not simply award one winner. They acknowledge several different recipients, have runners-up, and have third place. Since this is a specific recognition and is different from losing an award, runner-up mentions are considered wins in this award tally. For simplification and to avoid errors, each award in this list has been presumed to have had a prior nomination.)
- Wins: 13
- Nominations: 34

M. Night Shyamalan is Indian American film director, screenwriter, author, producer, and actor. Throughout his career he has received several awards including nominations for two Academy Awards, two BAFTA Awards, and a Golden Globe Awards.

Shyamalan gained acclaim and a career breakthrough for his third directorial feature, the psychological thriller The Sixth Sense (1999) and earned nominations for two Academy Awards for Best Director and Best Original Screenplay. He was also nominated for BAFTA Awards for Best Director and Best Original Screenplay as well as nominations for the Directors Guild of America Award for Outstanding Directing – Feature Film, Golden Globe Award for Best Screenplay, and Writers Guild of America Award for Best Original Screenplay and also received the Empire Award for Best Director.

Since the release of The Sixth Sense (1999), he has received career fluctuations with his critical reception leaning towards mixed to negative, receiving several Golden Raspberry Awards or also known as "Razzie Awards".

== Major associations ==
=== Academy Awards ===
Year	Category	Nominated work	Result	Ref.
2000	Best Director	The Sixth Sense	Nominated	
2000	Best Original Screenplay	The Sixth Sense	Nominated	

=== BAFTA Awards ===
Year	Category	Nominated work	Result	Ref.
2000	Best Direction	The Sixth Sense	Nominated	
2000	Best Original Screenplay	The Sixth Sense	Nominated	

=== Directors Guild of America ===
Year	Category	Nominated work	Result	Ref.
1999	Outstanding Directing – Feature Film	The Sixth Sense	Nominated	

=== Golden Globe Awards ===
Year	Category	Nominated work	Result	Ref.
2000	Best Screenplay	The Sixth Sense	Nominated	

=== Writers Guild of America ===
Year	Category	Nominated work	Result	Ref.
2000	Best Original Screenplay	The Sixth Sense	Nominated	

== Others ==
=== Razzie Awards ===
Year	Category	Nominated work	Result	Ref.
2007	Worst Picture	Lady in the Water	Nominated	
2007	Worst Director	Lady in the Water	Won	
2007	Worst Screenplay	Lady in the Water	Nominated	
2007	Worst Supporting Actor	Lady in the Water	Won	
2009	Worst Picture	The Happening	Nominated	
2009	Worst Director	The Happening	Nominated	
2009	Worst Screenplay	The Happening	Nominated	
2011	Worst Picture	The Last Airbender	Won	
2011	Worst Director	The Last Airbender	Won	
2011	Worst Screenplay	The Last Airbender	Won	
2011	Worst Remake, Rip-Off or Sequel	The Last Airbender	Nominated	
2014	Worst Picture	After Earth	Nominated	
2014	Worst Director	After Earth	Nominated	
2014	Worst Screenplay	After Earth	Nominated	
2016	Razzie Redeemer Award	The Visit	Nominated	

== Miscellaneous awards ==
Organizations	Year	Category	Work	Result	Ref.
Amanda Awards	1999	Best Foreign Feature Film	The Sixth Sense	Nominated	
Annie Awards	1999	Writing in a Feature Production	Stuart Little	Nominated	
Bram Stoker Awards	1999	Best Screenplay	The Sixth Sense	Won	
Bram Stoker Awards	2000	Best Screenplay	Unbreakable	Nominated	
Bram Stoker Awards	2002	Best Screenplay	Signs	Nominated	
Chicago Film Critics Association Awards	1999	Best Screenplay	The Sixth Sense	Nominated	
Chlotrudis Awards	1999	Best Screenplay	The Sixth Sense	Nominated	
Christopher Awards	2002	Best Film; Shared with Frank Marshall, Sam Mercer & Kathleen Kennedy	Signs	Won	
Empire Awards	1999	Best Director	The Sixth Sense	Won	
Empire Awards	2002	Best Director	Signs	Nominated	
Empire Awards	2004	Best Director	The Village	Nominated	
Fangoria Chainsaw Awards	2015	Best Wide-Release Film	The Visit	Nominated	
Hugo Awards	1999	Best Dramatic Presentation	The Sixth Sense	Nominated	
Nebula Awards	1999	Best Script	The Sixth Sense	Won	
Nebula Awards	2000	Best Script	Unbreakable	Nominated	
Online Film Critics Society	1999	Best Screenplay	The Sixth Sense	Nominated	
Online Film Critics Society	2002	Best Screenplay	Signs	Nominated	
Palm Springs International Film Festival	2000	Sonny Bono Visionary Award	Himself	Won	
Rondo Hatton Classic Horror Awards	2002	Best Genre Film	Signs	Nominated	
Rondo Hatton Classic Horror Awards	2015	Best Movie	The Visit	Nominated	
Satellite Awards	1999	Best Screenplay, Original	The Sixth Sense	Won	
Saturn Awards	1999	Best Writing	The Sixth Sense	Nominated	
SFX Awards	2002	Best SF or Fantasy Film Director	Signs	Nominated	
ShoWest Convention	2006	Director of the Year	Himself	Won	
Stinkers Bad Movie Awards	2006	Worst Director	Lady in the Water	Nominated	
Stinkers Bad Movie Awards	2006	Worst Screenplay	Lady in the Water	Nominated	

Directed Academy Award performances
Under Shyamalan's direction, these actors have received Academy Award nominations for their performances in their respective roles.

Year	Performer	Film	Result
Academy Award for Best Supporting Actor
2000	Haley Joel Osment	The Sixth Sense	Nominated
Academy Award for Best Supporting Actress
2000	Toni Collette	The Sixth Sense	Nominated

== See also ==
- List of accolades received by The Sixth Sense
- Unbreakable (film series), superhero series by Shyamalan
- Blinding Edge Pictures, film and television production company founded by M. Night Shyamalan
