= Michael Bamberger =

American journalist

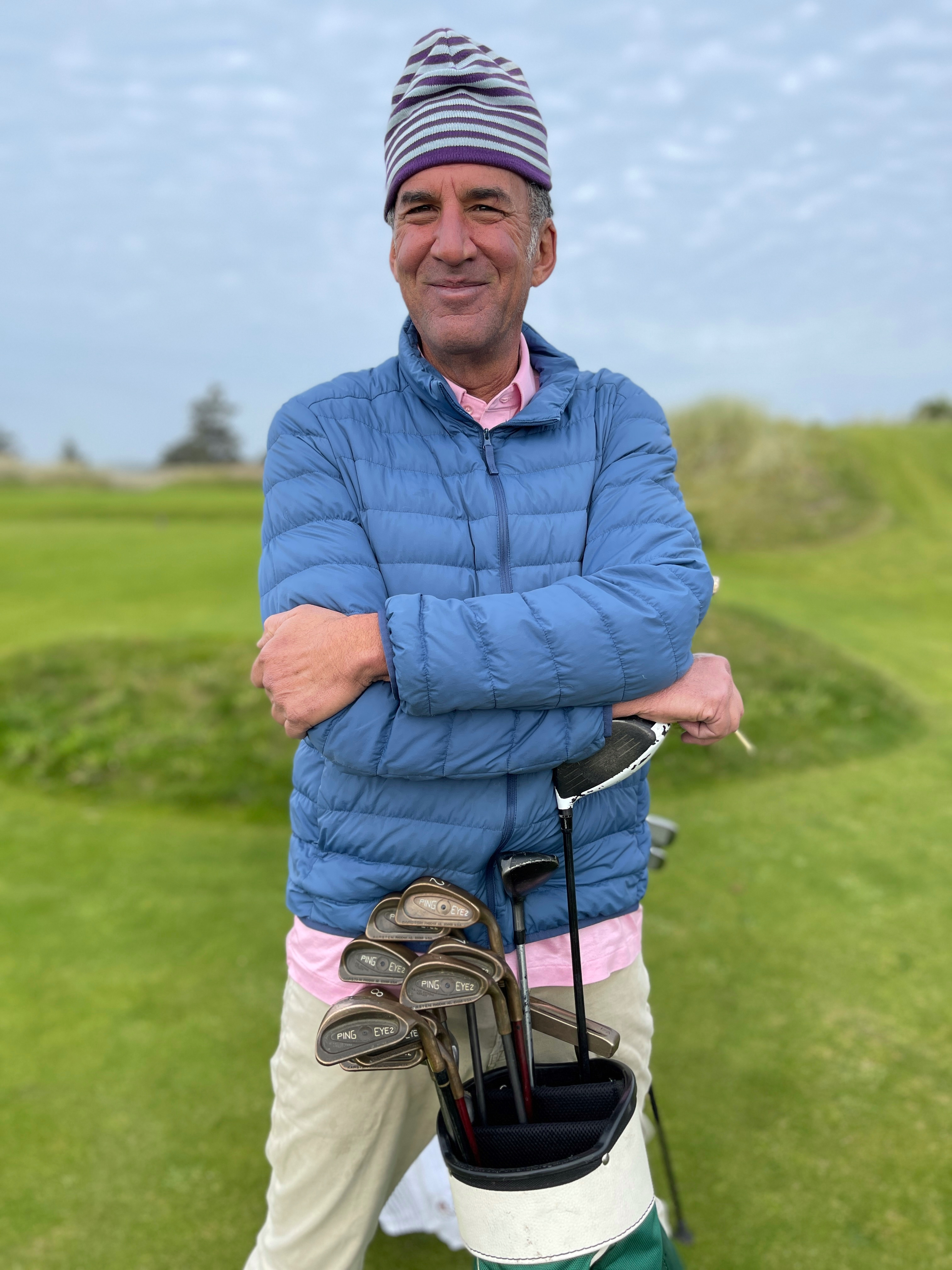
Michael Bamberger at Bandon Dunes. Photo: Matt Ginella.

Michael F. Bamberger (born April 15, 1960) is a senior writer for Golf.com and the author of multiple books.

== Early life ==
Bamberger was born and raised in Patchogue, New York. He attended its public schools (graduating from Patchogue-Medford High School in 1978), wrote for local newspapers and played golf on nearby public courses. His father was an engineer at Brookhaven National Laboratory and his mother taught English in the Patchogue-Medford School District.

== Career ==
After graduating from the University of Pennsylvania in 1982, Bamberger became a reporter for the Vineyard Gazette on Martha's Vineyard, Massachusetts. He joined The Philadelphia Inquirer in 1986 and became a senior writer for Sports Illustrated in 1995.

Bamberger is the author of nine nonfiction books and the co-author of one novel.

His two most recent books are The Ball in the Air (2023) and The Playing Lesson (2025). The Ball in the Air is about the lives of three amateur golfers, Pratima Sherpa, Ryan French and Sam Reeves. In The Playing Lesson Bamberger writes about his play in a number of pro-am golf events.

Wonderland: A Year in the Life of an American High School (2004), chronicles the senior year of a group of high school students. The rights for the book were bought by Paramount, and MTV and Tollin/Robbins Productions were to produce the film, which had tentatively been named Pennsbury. In 2004, Mike Tollin and Brian Robbins signed with Walt Disney Studios, leaving the status of the project uncertain.

The Man Who Heard Voices: Or, How M. Night Shyamalan Risked His Career on a Fairy Tale (2006), released the same week as the writer-director-producer's film Lady in the Water, profiles him as he develops it.

The Swinger (2011), a novel he wrote with fellow Sports Illustrated writer Alan Shipnuck, is a satire of the Tiger Woods sex scandal.

The Second Life of Tiger Woods (2020) covers Woods's win at the 2019 Masters.

He is also the author of four autobiographical books on golf: The Green Road Home (1986), To the Linksland (1992), This Golfing Life (2005) and Men in Green (2015).

Bamberger's play Bart & Fay, about the longtime relationship between Bart Giamatti and Fay Vincent, was performed in 1996 at Philadelphia's Walnut Street Theatre.

== Personal life ==
Bamberger and his wife, Christine, live in Philadelphia. They have two grown children, Ian and Alina. Bamberger's great, great-great-grandfather, Seligman Baer Bamberger, was a leading rabbi and Jewish scholar in Germany in the 19th century. Bamberger's niece, Cayla Bamberger, covers education and child welfare for the New York Daily News. In 2023, Bamberger was inducted into the Patchogue-Medford High School Hall of Fame.
