= Razzie Redeemer Award =

American annual film award

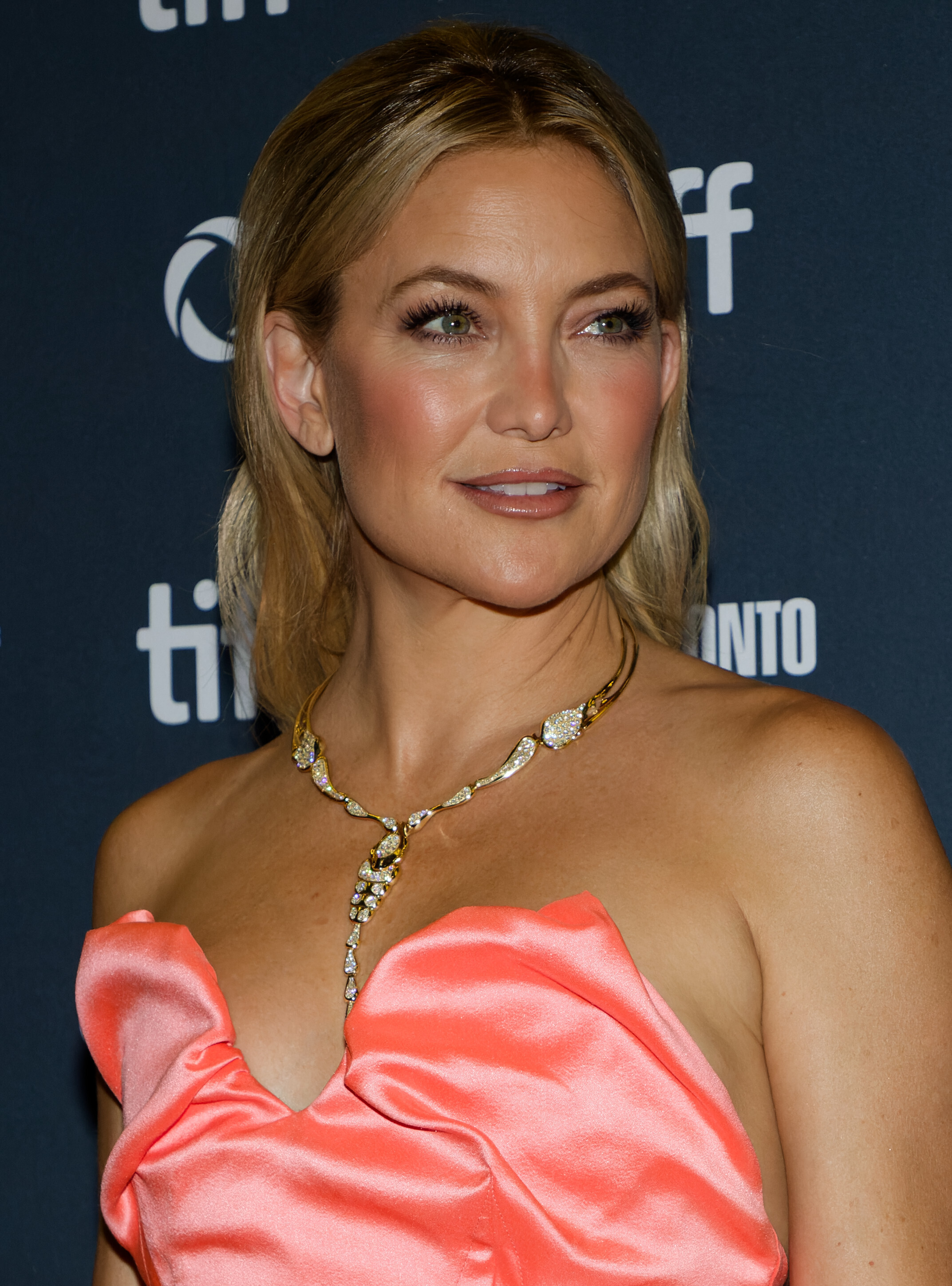
- The 2025 recipient: Kate Hudson
- Awarded for: Becoming a respected artist after having previously been nominated for a Golden Raspberry Award
- Country: United States
- Presented by: Golden Raspberry Award Foundation
- First award: Ben Affleck (2014)
- Currently held by: Kate Hudson (2025)
- Website: www.razzies.com

The Razzie Redeemer Award is an award presented at the annual Golden Raspberry Awards (also known as the Razzies) to a past Razzie Award nominee or winner who becomes "a respected artist" and comes back from critical or commercial failure.

== History ==
Billed as "the Razzie you want to win", it is the only award issued by the Golden Raspberry Award Foundation that can be considered a genuine honor. It was introduced in 2014.

== Winners and nominees ==
=== 2010s ===
Year	Recipient	From	To
2014
2014	Ben Affleck	Razzie winner of Gigli	Oscar darling for Argo & Gone Girl
2014	Jennifer Aniston	4-time Razzie nominee	Golden Globe nominee for Cake
2014	Mike Myers	Razzie winner of The Love Guru	Documentary director of Supermensch: The Legend of Shep Gordon
2014	Keanu Reeves	6-time Razzie nominee	Critical hit John Wick
2014	Kristen Stewart	Razzie winner of The Twilight Saga	Art house hit Camp X-Ray
2015
2015	Sylvester Stallone	All-time Razzie champ	2015 Academy Award contender for Creed
2015	Elizabeth Banks	Razzie winning director of Movie 43	Directing the 2015 hit film Pitch Perfect 2
2015	M. Night Shyamalan	Perennial Razzie winner	Directing the 2015 horror hit The Visit
2015	Will Smith	Following up Razzie wins for After Earth	Starring in Concussion
2016
2016	Mel Gibson	Worst Supporting Actor nominee for The Expendables 3	Directing Hacksaw Ridge
2017
2017	A Safe Hollywood-Haven	A history of Razzie-worthy behavior unfitting for an industry of artists...	Where talent is protected, nourished and allowed to flourish with proper compensation
2018
2018	Melissa McCarthy	Multi-Razzie darling	Oscar nominee for her out-of-caricature role in Can You Ever Forgive Me?
2018	Peter Farrelly	Razzie winner for one of the directors of Movie 43 and more shallow choices like Dumb and Dumber, etc.	Director and co-writer of the deeper humanistic story and heartfelt Green Book
2018	Tyler Perry	Multi-Razzie nominee and winner for his self-imposed Madea trap	Playing Colin Powell in the Oscar and Golden Globe favorite Vice
2018	Transformers franchise	The Razzie-targeted heap of metal Transformers	The more innocent and endearing three-dimensional approach taken with Bumblebee
2018	Sony Pictures Animation	The crass multi-Razzie winner, The Emoji Movie	The highly acclaimed Spider-Man: Into the Spider-Verse which was loved by critics and audiences alike
2019
2019	Eddie Murphy	Previously proclaimed Worst Actor of the Decade at the 30th Golden Raspberry Awards in 2010	Dolemite Is My Name
2019	Jennifer Lopez	10-time Razzie nominee (including for Worst Actress of the Decade in 2010), 2-time winner	Hustlers
2019	Keanu Reeves	6-time Razzie nominee	John Wick: Chapter 3 – Parabellum and Toy Story 4
2019	Adam Sandler	9-time Razzie winner, including for Worst Actor two consecutive years	Uncut Gems
2019	Will Smith	4-time Razzie winner	Aladdin

=== 2020s ===
Year	Recipient	From	To
2021
2021	Will Smith	4-time Razzie Winner	King Richard
2021	Nicolas Cage	9-time Razzie nominee	Pig
2021	Jamie Dornan	Fifty Shades of Grey Trilogy	Belfast
2022
2022	Colin Farrell	2004 Worst Actor nominee	2022 Best Actor Oscar Front-Runner
2022	Val Kilmer	The Island of Dr. Moreau	Val
2022	Mark Wahlberg	Transformers: The Last Knight	Father Stu
2023
2023	Fran Drescher	1997 Worst Actress nominee	Her brilliant shepherding of the actors’ guild through a prolonged 2023 strike with a successful conclusion.
2024
2024	Pamela Anderson	1996 Worst New Star winner	The Last Showgirl
2024	Demi Moore	9 Razzie nominations and 4 wins	The Substance
2024	Megan Fox	9 Razzie nominations and 3 wins	Subservience
2025
2025	Kate Hudson	2020 Worst Actress winner	Academy Award for Best Actress nominee for Song Sung Blue

== Multiple nominations ==
- Will Smith – 3 (one win)
- Keanu Reeves – 2
