= The Visit (2015 American film) =

Film by M. Night Shyamalan

- Theatrical release poster
- Directed by: M. Night Shyamalan
- Written by: M. Night Shyamalan
- Produced by: M. Night Shyamalan; Jason Blum; Marc Bienstock
- Starring: Olivia DeJonge; Ed Oxenbould; Deanna Dunagan; Peter McRobbie; Kathryn Hahn
- Cinematography: Maryse Alberti
- Edited by: Luke Ciarrocchi
- Production companies: Blinding Edge Pictures; Blumhouse Productions
- Distributed by: Universal Pictures
- Release dates: August 30, 2015 (Dublin); September 11, 2015 (United States)
- Running time: 94 minutes
- Country: United States
- Language: English
- Budget: $5 million
- Box office: $98.5 million

The Visit is a 2015 American found footage horror film written, co-produced and directed by M. Night Shyamalan and starring Olivia DeJonge, Ed Oxenbould, Deanna Dunagan, Peter McRobbie, and Kathryn Hahn. The film centers around two young siblings, teenage girl Becca (DeJonge) and her younger brother Tyler (Oxenbould), who go to stay with their estranged grandparents. During their stay, the siblings notice their grandparents behaving bizarrely and they set out to find the truth behind the strange circumstances at the farmstead.

The film was released in the United States on September 11, 2015, by Universal Pictures. It grossed $98.5 million worldwide against a $5 million production budget and received positive reviews from critics, with many calling it a return-to-form for Shyamalan's career.

== Plot ==
Two siblings from Philadelphia, Becca and Tyler, prepare for a five-day visit with their grandparents while their divorced mother Loretta goes on a cruise with her boyfriend. Loretta has not spoken to her parents in fifteen years after they disapproved of her marrying her high school teacher, and she simply sends her children, sight unseen, to her parents. Having never met their grandparents, the teens plan to record a documentary about their visit using a camcorder.

Becca and Tyler meet their grandparents, referred to as "Nana" and "Pop Pop", at a train station. Arriving at Nana and Pop Pop's isolated farmhouse, Becca and Tyler are instructed to never go into the basement and to not leave their room past 9:30 p.m. Although at first the grandparents seem pleasant, their behavior gradually becomes peculiar – Becca catches Nana projectile vomiting, Nana chases the teens during a game of hide-and-seek, Tyler finds a pile of soiled diapers in the shed, and Pop Pop attacks a man in town that he thinks is following them. When challenged, both grandparents are dismissive of each other's behavior: Pop Pop claims that Nana is sundowning, while Nana claims that Pop Pop is incontinent. As the erratic behavior intensifies, Becca and Tyler's documentary-style film evolves into one of mystery-solving and evidence collection.

Stacy, a woman Nana and Pop Pop helped in counseling, brings a blueberry cobbler to thank them, but is not seen leaving. Tyler decides to secretly film the living room during the night, but Nana discovers the camera and tries unsuccessfully to break into the children's locked bedroom with a knife.

Becca and Tyler call Loretta, begging her to come and collect them. Loretta asks where their grandparents are, and Tyler points the laptop's webcam out the window to show her they are in the backyard. Loretta panics and tells Becca and Tyler that the people they are staying with are not their grandparents. The teenagers attempt to escape and discover Stacy's body hanging from a tree. The "grandparents" find the children and force them to play Yahtzee. Later, Becca sneaks into the basement and finds the decomposed corpses of their real grandparents, along with uniforms from the psychiatric hospital at which they worked, revealing that Nana and Pop Pop are actually escaped patients who murdered the grandparents and stole their identities. Pop Pop grabs Becca and imprisons her in his bedroom with Nana, who tries to attack her in a psychotic fit. He then torments the germophobic Tyler by smearing his face with his soiled diaper. Following a struggle, Becca fatally stabs Nana with a glass shard from a broken mirror, then runs to the kitchen and attacks Pop Pop. As Pop Pop gains the upper hand, Tyler knocks him to the floor and kills him by repeatedly bashing his head with the refrigerator door. The teens escape outside, where they are met by their mother and police officers.

In the aftermath, Becca asks Loretta about what happened between her and her parents. Loretta reflects that she had a major argument with them, during which she hit her mother and was then struck by her father. Loretta then left home and ignored their attempts to contact her. Loretta concludes that reconciliation was always possible had she wanted it. She advises her children not to resent their father for abandoning them, and Becca decides to include footage of her father in their documentary after stating earlier that she would not do so.

During the credits, Tyler records and does a freestyle rap back at home about his and Becca's misadventure with the fake grandparents, while Becca looks on approvingly.

== Cast ==
- Olivia DeJonge as Becca Jamison
- Ed Oxenbould as Tyler Jamison
- Deanna Dunagan as Marja Bella Jamison (Claire), also known as "Nana"
- Peter McRobbie as Frederick Spencer Jamison (Mitchell), also known as "Pop Pop"
- Kathryn Hahn as Loretta Jamison, Becca and Tyler's mother
- Patch Darragh as Dr. Sam
- Celia Keenan-Bolger as Stacey
- Benjamin Kanes as Corin, Becca and Tyler's father

== Production ==
=== Development ===
After The Last Airbender and After Earth failed critically, Shyamalan funded The Visit by borrowing $5 million against his home and shot the film in 30 days.

=== Filming ===
Filming began on February 19, 2014, under the preliminary title Sundowning. Sundowning is the increased restlessness and confusion of some dementia patients during the afternoon and evening. Shyamalan's Blinding Edge Pictures was the production company, with Shyamalan and Marc Bienstock producing, and Steven Schneider and Ashwin Rajan as executive producers.

Although thousands of American children were auditioned for the film's two lead roles of Becca and Tyler, in what Shyamalan later characterized as a "total fluke", he eventually selected a pair of relatively unknown Australian juvenile actors, Olivia DeJonge and Ed Oxenbould, to portray the film's dual Philadelphia-native teenage protagonists.

Every Hollywood studio passed on the rough cut, and Shyamalan feared that he would lose the millions he had invested in the film. Shyamalan admitted that he had trouble keeping the tone for the film consistent during the editing phase, telling Bloody Disgusting that the first cut of the film resembled an art house film more than a horror film. A second cut went in the opposite direction and the film became a comedy. He eventually struck a middle balance and cut the film as a thriller, which, according to him, helped tie the different elements together as they "could stay in service of the movie". After revisions Universal Pictures agreed to distribute the film, and producer Jason Blum and his company Blumhouse Productions were included in the film's opening.

== Music ==
There is no film score for most of the film, as is common for found footage films. Paul Cantelon is credited for "epilogue theme". A few songs are heard during the film.

== Release ==
Universal began The Visit's theatrical wide release in the United States on September 11, 2015. On April 17, 2015, the first official trailer was released to theaters, attached to the film Unfriended, and it was released online later that week. The film premiered in the Republic of Ireland on August 30, 2015, in a special screening that was attended by Shyamalan.

=== Home media ===
The Visit was released on Blu-ray and DVD on January 5, 2016.

== Reception ==
=== Box office ===
The Visit grossed over $65.2 million in the United States and Canada and over $33.2 million in other territories for a worldwide total of over $98.4 million, against a budget of $5 million. The film grossed $25.4 million in its opening weekend, finishing second at the box office behind The Perfect Guy by just $460,000. Shyamalan kept a list of Hollywood executives who had refused to distribute The Visit, stating in 2018 that most had since lost their jobs.

=== Critical response ===
The Visit received generally positive reviews from critics. On review aggregator website Rotten Tomatoes, the film holds an approval rating of 68%, based on 231 reviews, with an average rating of 5.9/10. The site's critical consensus reads, "The Visit provides horror fans with a satisfying blend of thrills and laughs – and also signals a welcome return-to-form for writer-director M. Night Shyamalan." On Metacritic the film has a score of 55 out of 100 based on 34 critics, indicating "mixed or average reviews". Audiences polled by CinemaScore gave the film an average grade of "B−" on an A+ to F scale.

Scott Mendelson from Forbes called Shyamalan's film a "deliciously creepy and funny little triumph". He also wrote, "The Visit is the one we've been waiting for, folks. It's good. Oh my word, is it good. But more importantly, it is excellent in that specific way that reminds us why M. Night Shyamalan was once such a marvel. It is richly humanistic, filled with individually sketched characters that often sparkle with wit and surprising decency." In The New York Times, Manohla Dargis described the film as "an amusingly-grim fairy tale". Shyamalan has gone back to basics, "with a stripped-down story and scale, a largely-unknown (excellent) cast and one of those classically-tinged tales of child peril that have reliably spooked audiences for generations". She, along with other critics, saw the film as a modern-day version of the fairytale Hansel and Gretel.

In his column for The Observer, Mark Kermode panned the film, saying it may be worse than Lady in the Water. He wrote, "Is it meant to be a horror film? Or a comedy? The publicity calls it 'an original thriller' but it is neither of those things. Only 'endurance test' adequately describes the ill-judged shenanigans that ensue." Mike McCahill gave the film one star (out of five) in his review for The Guardian, and said it was "dull, derivative and flatly unscary."

=== Accolades ===
Award	Category	Subject	Result
Fangoria Chainsaw Awards	Best Wide Release Film	M. Night Shyamalan	Nominated
Fangoria Chainsaw Awards	Best Supporting Actress	Deanna Dunagan	3rd place
Fright Meter Awards	Best Supporting Actress	Deanna Dunagan	Won
Golden Raspberry Award	Razzie Redeemer Award	M. Night Shyamalan	Nominated
Golden Schmoes Award	Best Horror Movie of the Year		Nominated
Online Film & Television Association Award	Best Youth Performance	Ed Oxenbould	Nominated
Phoenix Film Critics Society	Best Performance by a Youth	Ed Oxenbould	Nominated
Rondo Hatton Classic Horror	Rondo Statuette for Best Movie	M. Night Shyamalan	Nominated
Saturn Awards	Best Horror Film		Nominated
Saturn Awards	Best Performance by a Younger Actor	Olivia DeJonge	Nominated
Young Artist Award	Best Leading Young Actress in a Feature Film	Olivia DeJonge	Nominated
