= Sam Mercer =

American film producer (1954/1955–2024)

- Born: January 15, 1955
- Died: February 12, 2024 (aged 69)
- Occupations: Film producer, location manager
- Known for: Producer of films by M. Night Shyamalan

Sam Mercer (January 15, 1955 – February 12, 2024) was an American film producer of many films directed by M. Night Shyamalan such as The Sixth Sense, Unbreakable, and Signs, as well as other films like Van Helsing and Things We Lost in the Fire. His career started during the early 1980s as a location manager and later advanced to a producer and executive producer. He also produced Shyamalan's films The Happening and The Last Airbender. He died from an early onset of Alzheimer's disease on February 12, 2024, at the age of 69.

== Filmography ==
Producer

Year	Film	Director	Notes
1995	Congo	Frank Marshall	Nominated—Golden Raspberry Award for Worst Picture
1997	The Relic	Peter Hyams	
2000	Unbreakable	M. Night Shyamalan	Nominated—IHG Award for Best Film
2002	Signs	M. Night Shyamalan	
2004	The Village	M. Night Shyamalan	
2006	Lady in the Water	M. Night Shyamalan	Nominated—Golden Raspberry Award for Worst Picture
2007	Things We Lost in the Fire	Susanne Bier	
2008	The Happening	M. Night Shyamalan	Nominated—Golden Raspberry Award for Worst Picture
2010	The Last Airbender	M. Night Shyamalan	Golden Raspberry Award for Worst Picture
2010	Devil	John Erick Dowdle	
2012	Sabbatical	Glenn Kiser	Short film
2012	Snow White and the Huntsman	Rupert Sanders	
2014	Heaven Is for Real	Randall Wallace	
2016	The BFG	Steven Spielberg	

Executive producer

Year	Film	Director	Notes
1999	The Sixth Sense	M. Night Shyamalan	
2000	Mission to Mars	Brian De Palma	
2004	Van Helsing	Stephen Sommers	
2005	Jarhead	Sam Mendes	
