= The Happening (2008 film) =

2008 film by M. Night Shyamalan

- Theatrical release poster
- Directed by: M. Night Shyamalan
- Written by: M. Night Shyamalan
- Produced by: M. Night Shyamalan; Sam Mercer; Barry Mendel
- Starring: Mark Wahlberg; Zooey Deschanel; John Leguizamo; Betty Buckley
- Cinematography: Tak Fujimoto
- Edited by: Conrad Buff
- Music by: James Newton Howard
- Production companies: 20th Century Fox; UTV Motion Pictures; Spyglass Entertainment; Blinding Edge Pictures
- Distributed by: 20th Century Fox (Worldwide); UTV Motion Pictures (India)
- Release dates: June 10, 2008 (New York City); June 13, 2008 (United States)
- Running time: 90 minutes
- Countries: United States; India
- Language: English
- Budget: $48–60 million (Note: Box Office Mojo lists the film's budget at $48 million. When the film was in pre-production, the budget was reported to be $57 million. In 2021, Forbes said the film had a budget of $60 million.)
- Box office: $163.4 million

The Happening is a 2008 science fiction thriller film produced, written, and directed by M. Night Shyamalan. It stars Mark Wahlberg, Zooey Deschanel, John Leguizamo, and Betty Buckley. The story revolves around an inexplicable natural disaster causing mass suicides.

The Happening premiered in New York City on June 10, 2008, and was theatrically released in the United States by 20th Century Fox on June 13. It was a box-office success, grossing $163 million worldwide against a budget of up to $60 million. The film received negative reviews upon release, with criticism of its acting, characters, writing, and Shyamalan's direction. However, it earned some reappraisal by those who viewed it as a "B movie", as Shyamalan intended, noting its usage of classic tropes.

== Plot ==
In New York City's Central Park, people begin committing mass suicide. The event is believed to be caused by a bio-terrorist attack using an airborne neurotoxin. The behavior quickly spreads across the Northeastern United States. High school science teacher Elliot Moore and his wife Alma are persuaded by Elliot's mathematician colleague Julian to accompany him and his daughter Jess on a train out of Philadelphia. During the trip, the group learns Boston and Philadelphia have been affected. The train loses all radio contact and stops at a small town. When Julian learns his wife has left Boston for Princeton, he decides to look for her and entrusts Jess to the Moores. However, Julian arrives to find Princeton has been affected, causing the driver of the car in which he is riding to ram into a tree. Julian survives but commits suicide by slitting his wrist with a glass shard.

Elliot, Alma, and Jess hitch a ride with a nurseryman and his wife. The nurseryman hypothesizes that plant life has developed a defense mechanism against humans consisting of an airborne toxin that stimulates neurotransmitters and causes humans to kill themselves. The group is later joined by other survivors coming from various directions, and the small crowd chooses to avoid roads and populated areas. When the larger part of the group is affected by the toxin, Elliot suggests the nurseryman was right and the plants are targeting only large groups of people. He splits their group into smaller pockets and they walk along. The trio ends up with a pair of teenage boys, Josh and Jared, who are later shot and killed by the armed residents of a barricaded house.

Elliot, Alma, and Jess wander the countryside and come upon the home of Mrs. Jones, an eccentric and paranoid elderly woman. Jones initially agrees to house the group for the night but is suspicious of them having bad intentions; the next morning, she decides to expel them. In a fury, she leaves the house alone and is affected by the toxin. The shaken Elliot realizes the plants are now targeting individuals. Left with no option when Mrs. Jones strikes her head into several windows, the trio chooses to die and embraces in the yard only to find themselves unaffected by the toxin. The outbreak has abated as quickly as it began.

Three months later, Elliot and Alma have adjusted to their new life with Jess as their adopted daughter. Alma learns she is pregnant and surprises Elliot with the news. On television, an expert compares the natural event to a red tide and warns the epidemic may have only been a harbinger of an impending global disaster. In Paris's Tuileries Gardens, people begin committing mass suicide.

== Cast ==
- Mark Wahlberg as Elliot Moore
- Zooey Deschanel as Alma Moore, Elliot's wife
- John Leguizamo as Julian
- Betty Buckley as Mrs. Jones
- Ashlyn Sanchez as Jess, Julian's daughter
- Frank Collison as nursery owner
- Victoria Clark as nursery owner
- Spencer Breslin as Josh
- Robert Bailey, Jr. as Jared
- Jeremy Strong as Private Auster
- M. Night Shyamalan as Joey (voice only)

== Production ==
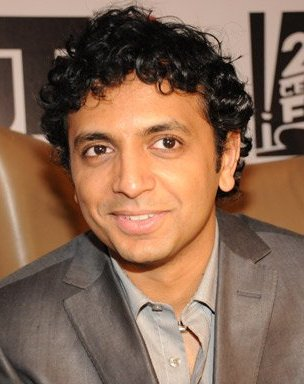
Shyamalan in a 2008 press conference for the film

Following the critical and commercial failure of Lady in the Water (2006), M. Night Shyamalan struggled to sell his next spec script entitled The Green Effect. By January 2007, it was reported several studios had received the screenplay, but none expressed interest enough to purchase it. As a result, Shyamalan began taking notes and collecting ideas from meetings before returning home to Philadelphia to rewrite his script. In March 2007, the film was purchased as The Happening by 20th Century Fox, Mark Wahlberg joined the cast, and a theatrical release date was set for June 13, 2008. The film is Shyamalan's first R-rated project, which he produced alongside Sam Mercer and Barry Mendel. The India-based company UTV Motion Pictures also financed half of the film's budget. On March 15, 2007, Shyamalan described The Happening as a 1960s paranoia film similar to The Birds and Invasion of the Body Snatchers. Production began in August 2007 in Philadelphia, with filming taking place on Walnut Street, in Rittenhouse Square Park, in Masterman High School, on South Smedley Street, and at the 'G' Lodge in Phoenixville. During post-production, the film score was recorded at the Sony Scoring Stage and composed by James Newton Howard in his sixth collaboration with Shyamalan.

== Release ==
=== Box office ===
The marketing campaign for The Happening was noted for its "aggressive" tactics and "great visuals" that successfully intrigued audiences. According to Deadline Hollywood, the film was negatively targeted by several media outlets that began rooting for the film's failure, including USA Today, while also branding Shyamalan as "the hopelessly arrogant has-been". In its opening weekend, the film grossed $30.5 million, including $13 million on its first day and $10.2 million on its second, exceeding expectations and placing third at the box office. Outside the United States and Canada, the film made $32.1 million across 88 international markets in its first three days.

=== Home media ===
As of August 2020, the DVD units sold have generated over US$22.4 million in revenue.

== Reception ==
=== Critical response ===
On the review aggregator website Rotten Tomatoes, 17% of 185 critics' reviews are positive, with an average rating of 4/10. The website's critical consensus reads, "The Happening begins with promise, but unfortunately descends into an incoherent and unconvincing trifle." Metacritic, which uses a weighted average, assigned the film a score of 34 out of 100, based on 38 critics, indicating "generally unfavorable" reviews. Audiences polled by CinemaScore gave the film an average grade of "D" on an A+ to F scale.

Some critics enjoyed it. Glenn Whipp said "Tamping down the self-seriousness in favor of some horrific silliness, M. Night Shyamalan's The Happening plays as a genuinely enjoyable B-movie for anyone inclined (or able) to see it that way".

Kirk Honeycutt of The Hollywood Reporter said the film lacked "cinematic intrigue and nail-biting tension" and "the central menace ... does not pan out as any kind of Friday night entertainment". Variety's Justin Chang felt it "covers territory already over-tilled by countless disaster epics and zombie movies, offering little in the way of suspense, visceral kicks or narrative vitality to warrant the retread". Mick LaSalle wrote in his San Francisco Chronicle review that he considered the film entertaining but not scary. He commented, too, on Shyamalan's writing, opining that, "instead of letting his idea breathe and develop and see where it might go, he jumps all over it and prematurely shapes it into a story".

James Berardinelli said the film had neither "a sense of atmosphere" nor "strong character development", calling its environmental message "way-too-obvious and strident", gave it one and a half stars out of a possible four, and concluded his review by saying "The Happening is a movie to walk out of, sleep through, or—best of all—not to bother with." Time's Richard Corliss saw the film as a "dispiriting indication that writer-director M. Night Shyamalan has lost the touch". The Chicago Tribune's Michael Phillips thought the film had a workable premise, but found the characters to be "gasbags or forgetful". Joe Morgenstern of The Wall Street Journal said the film was a "woeful clunker of a paranoid thriller" and highlighted its "befuddling infelicities, insistent banalities, shambling pace and pervasive ineptitude".

Stephen King liked the film, stating: "Of Fox's two summer creepshows [the other being The X-Files: I Want to Believe], give the edge to The Happening, partly because M. Night Shyamalan really understands fear, partly because this time he's completely let himself go (hence the R rating), and partly because after Lady in the Water he had something to prove". Critic Roger Ebert of the Chicago Sun-Times, awarding the movie three stars, found it "oddly touching": "It is no doubt too thoughtful for the summer action season, but I appreciate the quietly realistic way Shyamalan finds to tell a story about the possible death of man". William Arnold of the Seattle Post-Intelligencer called it "something different—and a pleasant surprise" among that summer's major Hollywood releases, and approved of its taking "the less-is-best approach". The New York Times' Manohla Dargis praised Wahlberg's lead performance, adding that the film "turns out to be a divertingly goofy thriller with an animistic bent, moments of shivery and twitchy suspense".

Philipa Hawker of The Age gave it 3.5 out of 5 stars, commenting on "the mood of the film: a tantalizing, sometimes frustrating parable about the menaces that human beings might face from unexpected quarters," drawing special attention to "the sound of the breeze and the sight of it ruffling the trees or blowing across the grass — an image of tension that calls to mind Antonioni's Blowup". Richard Roeper of the Chicago Sun-Times said "It almost dares you to roll your eyes or laugh at certain scenes that are supposed to be deadly serious. But, you know what, I appreciated this creatively offbeat, daring sci-fi mind-trip". Reviewer Rumsey Taylor said the film moves forward with "jack-in-the-box suspense, traipsing from one garish death to another in a parade of cartoonish terror," and noted how the film seemed like "Alfred Hitchcock's The Birds, only without the birds."

The Happening has also attracted academic attention. Joseph J. Foy, professor of politics and popular culture, describes Shyamalan's film as an expression of "post-environmentalism" in which traditional paradigmatic politics are replaced with a call for the world to "embrace a revolutionary reevaluation of wealth and prosperity not in terms of monetary net worth or material possessions, but in terms of overall well-being". Foy praises the highly complex narrative in which Shyamalan weaves contemporary environmental challenges with hard science and social theory to create a "nightmarish future that... may advance the type of dialogue that can truly change the cultural conversation".

=== Responses of cast and crew ===
On June 7, 2008, days before the first few reviews for the film came online, Shyamalan told the New York Daily News: "We're making an excellent B movie, that's our goal". Wahlberg offered his own opinion of The Happening in 2010, saying Amy Adams, who was in consideration for the role of Alma Moore, had "dodged the bullet" by not starring in the film. He said, "It was a really bad movie... F—k it. It is what it is... You can't blame me for not wanting to try to play a science teacher. At least I wasn't playing a cop or a crook." About Wahlberg's reaction, Shyamalan said he is fine with his opinion: "Since that would be the only case of that happening — no. But really, no. It's totally his call. However he wants to interpret it."

In 2019, Shyamalan said he took some responsibility for the way the movie turned out: "I think it's a consistent kind of farce humor. You know, like The Blob. The campy, 1958 debut of actor Steve McQueen, featuring a mysterious, growing amoeba that takes over a small Pennsylvania town. The key to The Blob is that it just never takes itself that seriously. I think I was inconsistent. That's why they couldn't see it." In 2022, Deschanel also defended the movie: "The director, M. Night Shyamalan – Night – had a strong vision and we were all trying to do what he wanted. I trusted him, because he's a great film-maker. I didn't know until I saw the film, but I think he was going for a stylised horror, like The Birds, and maybe people didn't get that."

=== Re-evaluation as a B movie ===
In 2016, Ignatiy Vishnevetsky of The A.V. Club said it was "Patterned on the B movies of the early atomic age, the best of which could be sophisticated in everything except premise and acting, the movie swaps out radiation for climate change, but otherwise keeps to the template, complete with an ending in which a man in a suit explains everything that happened, but not really." He further stated "Sometimes, it mimics the goofiness of authentic '50s B movies; this is one of those cases where the miscasting—namely, Mark Wahlberg as a Philadelphia science teacher who looks and talks like a football coach who's been forced to sub sex ed—seems at least partly intentional. And yet, even with its non sequitur references to food (tiramisu, hot dogs, "lemon drink", etc.) and its winks of self-parody (e.g., Wahlberg talking to a plastic plant), The Happening is a movie that a lot of people presume is trying and failing to be taken seriously. And maybe it is." He further summarized that "... in The Happening, everything is premised on the assumption that life is meaningless—a deep anxiety that informs the movie's abstracted scare scenarios, but is also hidden behind camp. It's not incoherent, but it's often hard to read. It's a genuine curio, not entirely successful, and if you subscribe to the old auteurist line of movies being both expressions and entertainment objects, it's both too self-consciously silly and too personal to dismiss."

On its 10th year anniversary, Jeff Spry of Syfy said M. Night Shyamalan's The Happening is a better B movie 10 years later. He summarized that "The Happening contains some genuinely moving sequences, gruesome slaughter, a few intimate moments that truly resonate, and some laugh-out-loud scenes that defy explanation (see: a confused man is being eaten by hungry lions). While it's overacted in many spots and completely bonkers in others, it's a fascinating mix of eco-didacticism, post 9/11 trauma, spaced-out Zooey Deschanel, Cabbage Patch doll jokes, mood rings, math riddles, hot dog love, and silly, unsophisticated screenwriting based on shaky pseudo-science." For the same anniversary, Chris Evangelista of Slashfilm noted the film deserved to be recognized as a B-Movie classic. He said "It's time to embrace the movie for what it really is: an intentionally goofy, highly entertaining B-movie that should be celebrated for its own stupid charms rather than mercilessly mocked and scorned."

In 2018, Craig Lines of Den of Geek said "Just about every aspect of The Happening is a defiance of expectation. It uses the tropes of classic disaster/survival B-Movies (Shyamalan clearly knows his classics) but inverts them. The pacing of the film, for example, moves in reverse. It starts off quite fraught and slows down further and further as it goes on. By the time it reaches its (anti)climax, it's become almost motionless with fewer words, longer takes, extended periods of stillness and silence; a vastness you can almost feel." He summarized that "The script here is so carefully constructed, so multi-layered and so rhythmic it's almost poetry. The fact that much of the dialogue was deemed simply ridiculous by audiences saddens me because every word feels so perfectly in place."

In 2020, Lindsay Traves of Bloody Disgusting said it was a deadpan comedy in disguise featuring numerous trope parodies and summarised "The Happening gave us a film that wasn't about any real killer, but hinted it might be about nationalism, post 9/11 fears and American paranoia. Then it dared us to ask if we should take it seriously." The same year, Scott Mendelson of Forbes summarized "The Happening is unique unto itself, is rarely boring and has aged well in terms of being a bonkers/original premise delivered with a relatively straight-face (and just a hint of knowing camp). At its core, the Mark Wahlberg/Zooey Deschanel sci-fi chiller is essentially 'What if one of our more genuinely talented directors made a big-budget, R-rated Ed Wood movie?' Shyamalan is nothing if not sincere, and while he's attempting a modern-day version of a 1950s sci-fi warning movie, the film is absolutely invested in its mother nature is tired of humanity's bullshit premise."

=== Awards ===
The film was nominated for four Golden Raspberry Awards: Worst Picture, Worst Actor for Mark Wahlberg (also for Max Payne), Worst Director, and Worst Screenplay for M. Night Shyamalan. The film was also nominated for Best Horror Film at the Saturn Awards but lost to Hellboy II: The Golden Army.

The Happening came in eighth in a 2010 poll by Empire magazine of "50 Worst Movies of All Time", and first in a 2012 poll by SFX magazine of "50 Worst Sci-fi & Fantasy Movies That Had No Excuse".
