= Wide Awake (1998 film) =

1998 film directed by M. Night Shyamalan

- Theatrical release poster
- Directed by: M. Night Shyamalan
- Written by: M. Night Shyamalan
- Produced by: Cathy Konrad; Cary Woods
- Starring: Denis Leary; Dana Delany; Robert Loggia; Joseph Cross; Timothy Reifsnyder; Rosie O'Donnell
- Cinematography: Adam Holender
- Edited by: Andrew Mondshein
- Music by: Edmund Choi
- Production company: Woods Entertainment
- Distributed by: Miramax Films
- Release date: March 20, 1998
- Running time: 88 minutes
- Country: United States
- Language: English
- Budget: $6 million
- Box office: $282,175

Wide Awake is a 1998 American comedy-drama film written and directed by M. Night Shyamalan and produced by Cathy Konrad and Cary Woods. Starring Denis Leary, Dana Delany, Joseph Cross, and Rosie O'Donnell, the film follows Cross as a ten-year-old boy who struggles with his grief and Christian faith after the recent loss of his grandfather.

Released by Miramax Films, it was Shyamalan's first release by a major studio after his independently produced debut Praying with Anger in 1992, and was originally shot in 1995, although creative differences between Shyamalan and executive producer Harvey Weinstein led to significant delays. Being released before Shyamalan's widely successful next film The Sixth Sense (1999), Wide Awake went mostly unnoticed upon release, receiving mixed reviews and becoming a box-office failure.

== Plot ==
During his fifth grade year, ten-year-old Joshua A. Beal begins a personal search to find answers about life and death — a journey triggered by the passing of his beloved grandfather.

Josh attends Waldron Mercy Academy, a private Catholic boys' school in Philadelphia. He says that boys who wear a uniform do not smile much. His best friend Dave is often up to mischief, finding ways to cut class. Small for his age, he often gets picked on.

Very close to his grandfather, he misses him terribly. The adults in his world have not been able to convince him that he is in good hands, so he sets out on a personal mission to find God.

In their varying ways Josh is guided on his metaphorical journey by Dave and a Philadelphia Phillies-loving nun who teaches at Waldron. Dave creates a distraction so that Josh can sneak into the girls' school to meet the cardinal, who he hopes can help him with his faith. However, seeing him up close makes him see that he's a fragile old man. Josh tries to convince his family to travel to Rome over the winter break, but his parents quickly realise it's part of his quest for God and shoot down his proposal.

Hope, a girl who helps him in the girls' school, becomes Josh's first crush. They meet again at a boy's birthday party, and he confesses his feelings for her. Another day, when the boys' school is invited to watch a ceremony in which the girls' school offer flowers to the virgin, Hope gives her rose to Josh for his quest.

A series of events happen with Josh's classmates. One oddly steals the school's framed portrait of the pope, his bully has to leave the school for insufficient funds, after getting stuck in a turnstile with Frank he finally agrees to spend time with him, and Dave is diagnosed with epilepsy. The little, mute kid is strongly implied at the end to either be an angel, a ghost, or Jesus.

== Cast ==
- Denis Leary as Mr. Beal
- Dana Delany as Mrs. Beal
- Robert Loggia as Grandpa Beal
- Joseph Cross as Joshua Beal
- Timothy Reifsnyder as Dave O'Hara
- Camryn Manheim as Sister Sophia
- Heather Casler as Hope
- Dan Lauria as Father Peters
- Rosie O'Donnell as Sister Terry

In addition, Julia Stiles appears as Neena Beal, while Michael Craig Bigwood plays the little boy who Joshua learns is an angel.

== Production and release ==
The script was written in 1991. Shyamalan has described Wide Awake as a comedy that he hoped would also make people cry. While the shooting was completed in 1995, problems arose upon Shyamalan's submission of his final cut with Harvey Weinstein voicing his intentions to recut the film. Shyamalan and Rosie O'Donnell confronted Weinstein about his decision and the film was buried until 1998 when it was given a very limited release after Shyamalan's high profile sale of the spec script for The Sixth Sense. The film has a 1997 copyright date in the credits, presumably since post-production was not completed until that year.

== Reception ==
Wide Awake received mixed reviews from critics. On Rotten Tomatoes, it has a 45% approval rating based on 33 reviews, with an average score of 5.1/10. Metacritic, which uses a weighted average, assigned the film a score of 50 out of 100, based on 21 critics, indicating "mixed or average" reviews. In a positive review, Kevin Thomas of the Los Angeles Times characterized it as "a wonderful family film." He praised Cross as "a marvel, a terrific young actor who expresses beautifully Joshua’s conflicting emotions, his clear intelligence and staunch character." In a negative review, Stephen Holden of The New York Times characterized the film as "insufferable."

== Awards and accolades ==
Wide Awake was nominated for "Best Family Feature – Drama" and "Best Performance in a Feature Film – Leading Young Actor" at the 1999 Young Artist Awards.

== Home media ==
The film was first released on VHS in the United States on September 15, 1998, by Miramax Home Entertainment. The DVD release followed on March 28, 2000. The DVD's release came after the success of The Sixth Sense in late 1999.

On January 10, 2012, Echo Bridge Home Entertainment reissued Wide Awake on DVD with new artwork. Paramount Home Entertainment reissued the film on DVD on August 10, 2021, with this being one of many Miramax titles that they reissued around this time. It has the same artwork as the 2000 DVD, with the Paramount mountain logo being added to the packaging like with all of their other Miramax reissues.

== See also ==
- List of films about angels
