= Signs (film) =

2002 film by M. Night Shyamalan

- Theatrical release poster
- Directed by: M. Night Shyamalan
- Written by: M. Night Shyamalan
- Produced by: Kathleen Kennedy; Frank Marshall; M. Night Shyamalan; Sam Mercer
- Starring: Mel Gibson; Joaquin Phoenix
- Cinematography: Tak Fujimoto
- Edited by: Barbara Tulliver
- Music by: James Newton Howard
- Production companies: Touchstone Pictures; Blinding Edge Pictures; The Kennedy/Marshall Company
- Distributed by: Buena Vista Pictures Distribution
- Release date: August 2, 2002 (United States)
- Running time: 106 minutes
- Country: United States
- Language: English
- Budget: $72 million
- Box office: $408.2 million

Signs is a 2002 American science fiction horror thriller film written and directed by M. Night Shyamalan and produced by Shyamalan, Frank Marshall, Kathleen Kennedy and Sam Mercer. The film was produced by Touchstone Pictures, Blinding Edge Pictures and The Kennedy/Marshall Company. It was distributed by Buena Vista Pictures. Starring Mel Gibson and Joaquin Phoenix, the story focuses on a former Episcopal priest named Graham Hess who discovers a series of crop circles in his cornfield and that the phenomenon is a result of extraterrestrial life. Signs explores the themes of faith, kinship, and extraterrestrials.

Signs premiered in theaters on August 2, 2002. The film was a financial success, grossing $408 million on a $72 million budget, becoming the seventh-highest-grossing film of 2002, and was met with positive reviews from critics, with many praising its atmosphere, performances, cinematography, score and story, but others criticizing aspects of the script. The film was nominated for multiple awards, including those from the Online Film Critics Society and the Empire Awards. The film also won an award from the American Society of Composers, Authors and Publishers. The high definition Blu-ray Disc edition of the film featuring the director's audio commentary, the making of the film and deleted scenes was released in the United States on June 3, 2008. The original motion picture soundtrack, which was composed by James Newton Howard, was released on the opening day by the Hollywood Records label.

== Plot ==
Former Episcopal priest Graham Hess lives on a rural farm in Doylestown, Pennsylvania, with his asthmatic preteen son, Morgan, and young daughter, Bo, who has a fixation on contaminated water. Graham's younger brother Merrill, a failed minor league baseball player, has been helping the family since Graham's wife Colleen died in a traffic collision six months earlier. Graham abandoned the church in the aftermath of the incident.

A large crop circle appears in the Hesses' cornfield, which they initially attribute to vandals; however, other similar crop circles begin appearing globally. On successive nights, Graham sees an intruder standing on the roof of his home and in the cornfield, yet remains adamant there is a reasonable explanation for all events. When lights from unseen objects begin appearing over more and more of Earth's cities, speculation of an alien invasion grows worldwide, including at the Hesses' farm. Morgan believes he hears alien noises on Bo's old baby monitor, while Merrill becomes convinced after seeing footage from Brazil of an unidentified humanoid creature.

Graham receives a phone call from veterinarian Ray Reddy, the man responsible for his wife's death, and drives to his house. Expressing remorse for Colleen's death, Reddy tells Graham of a creature he has locked in his pantry and, believing they avoid water, he leaves for the lake. Graham enters the house and attempts to see under the pantry door, when a clawed hand swipes at him and he severs the creature's fingers in a panic. Having seen this, Graham decides to protect his house by boarding up the windows and doors. That night, a global alien invasion begins and several aliens break into the house. The family takes refuge in the basement, where Morgan has an asthma attack, but despite leaving his medication upstairs, Morgan survives the night.

The next morning, when they hear radio reports that the aliens have left, the family emerges from the basement. They lay Morgan on the couch as they go to get his medications and look around to assess everything. They find the creature from Reddy's house in their living room holding Morgan. The creature sprays Morgan with a mysterious gas. Graham recalls Colleen's dying words, "tell Merrill, swing away". Graham looks to Merrill and the bat hanging on the wall behind him and tells Merrill to 'swing away'. Merrill begins swinging at the creature with his baseball bat, knocking the creature into glasses of water left out by Bo, which reacts to the creature's skin like an acid, weakening it and with a final swing and more water, taking the creature out. Graham rescues his son and carries him outside. He administers Morgan's medication, realizing that his son's constricted lungs prevented him from inhaling the toxins, an act that Graham attributes to the intervention of a higher power. By winter, the Hess family has recovered from the ordeal, and Graham returns to the church.

== Cast ==
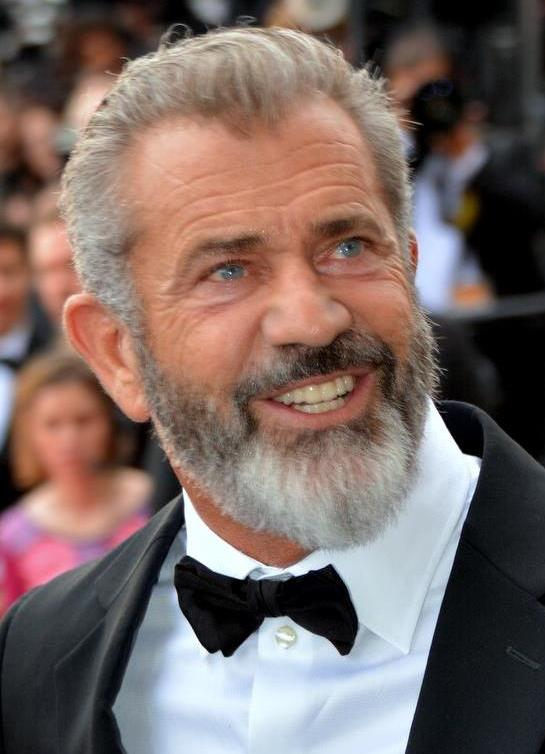
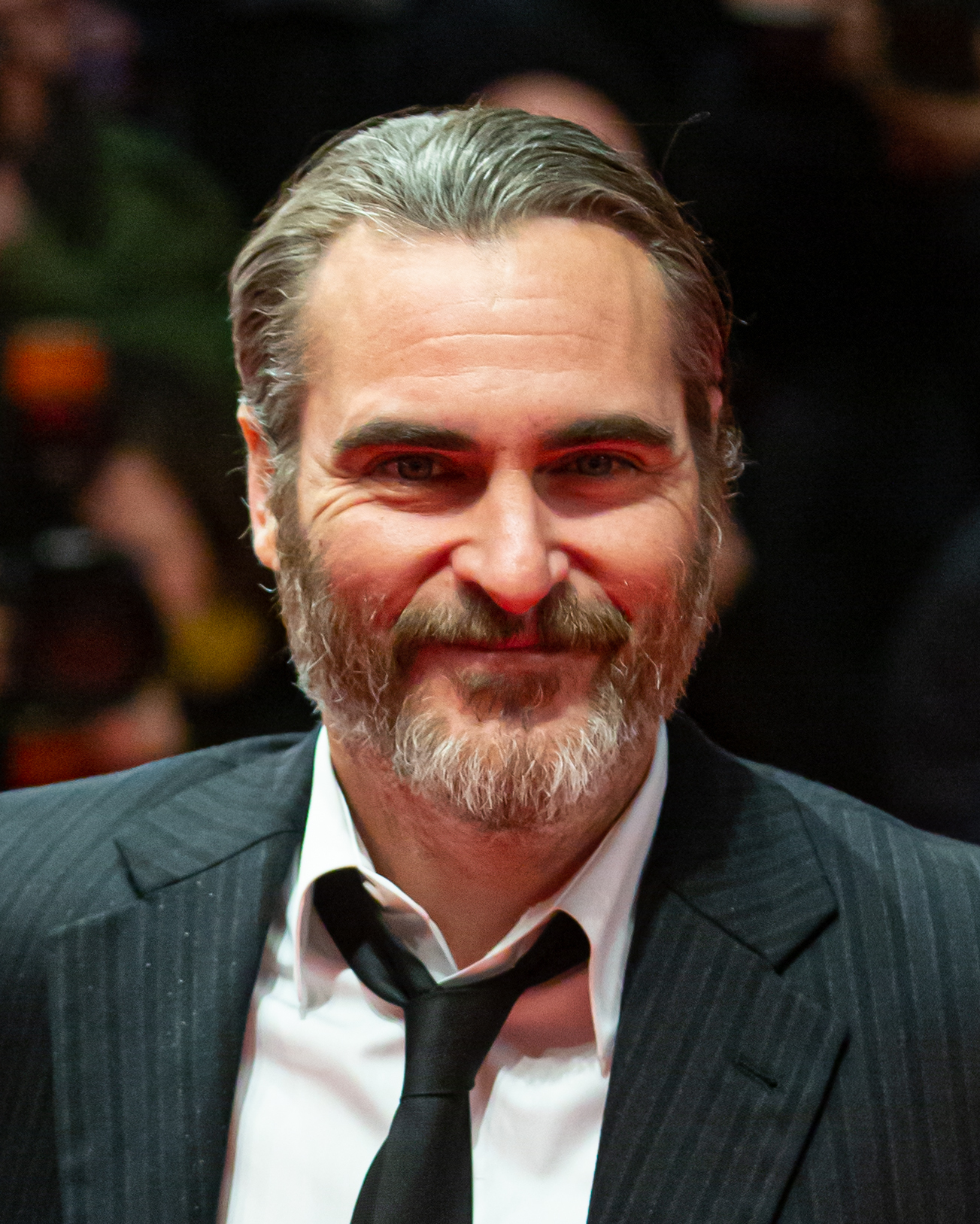
Mel Gibson (left) and Joaquin Phoenix, who play the lead roles in the film
- Mel Gibson as Father Graham Hess, a farmer and former Episcopal priest. His wife Colleen died six months prior. He is Merrill's older brother and father to son Morgan and daughter Bo.
- Joaquin Phoenix as Merrill Hess, Graham's younger brother; Colleen's brother-in-law; and the uncle of Morgan and Bo. He has been living with the family since Colleen's death; he is a former minor league baseball player.
- Cherry Jones as Caroline Paski, a local police officer and friend of the Hess family.
- Rory Culkin as Morgan Hess, the son of Graham and Colleen Hess; older brother to sister Bo; and nephew to Merrill.
- Abigail Breslin as Bo Hess, the daughter of Graham and Colleen Hess; Morgan's younger sister; and niece to Merrill; she is the youngest of the Hess family.
- Patricia Kalember as Colleen Hess, Graham's deceased wife; mother of Morgan and Bo; and Merrill's sister-in-law; she is seen only in Graham's flashbacks.
- M. Night Shyamalan as Ray Reddy, a veterinarian; he is responsible for Colleen's accidental death, for which he feels deeply remorseful.
- Ted Sutton as SFC Cunningham, an Army recruiter Merrill speaks to.
- Merritt Wever as Tracey Abernathy, a pharmacist who makes confession to a discomforted Graham.
- Lanny Flaherty as Carl Nathan, the crotchety owner of the bookstore in town.
- Marion McCorry as Mrs. Nathan, Carl Nathan’s wife.
- Michael Showalter as Lionel Prichard, a local troublemaker.
- Clifford David as a Columbia University professor viewed on television.

== Production ==
M. Night Shyamalan was a fan of the film You Can Count on Me and cast Rory Culkin and Mark Ruffalo. However, Ruffalo required surgery for a tumor behind his ear and was unable to work on the film, so a week before filming the role was recast with Joaquin Phoenix. The role of Graham was originally written to be an older man. Shyamalan approached Paul Newman for the role, but he declined due to lack of interest, and he also approached Clint Eastwood, who declined due to scheduling conflicts. Mel Gibson accepted the role after he read the script.

Shyamalan has said that the film's concept is the combination of two ideas – a family finding a crop circle on their property, and an "end of the world" premise.

Signs was filmed in 2001. All scenes shot on location were filmed in Bucks County, Pennsylvania. The scenes of the house and cornfield were shot inside the campus of Delaware Valley University, an agricultural college, where they had 40 acres (16 ha) of land to use. The scenes in the bookstore and the pizza shop were filmed in Newtown, Pennsylvania, and the pharmacy scene was shot in Morrisville, Pennsylvania.

== Soundtrack ==
All music was composed by James Newton Howard. The score was conducted by Pete Anthony and performed by the Hollywood Studio Symphony.

Signs

Film score by James Newton Howard
- Released: July 30, 2002
- Recorded: Todd Scoring Stage (Studio City, Los Angeles); JHN Studios (Santa Monica, California)
- Genre: Orchestral
- Length: 45:34
- Label: Hollywood
- Producers: James Newton Howard, Thomas Drescher, Tom Drescher

Professional ratings
Review scores
Source	Rating
AllMusic	3/5 stars
Filmtracks	3/5 stars
SoundtrackNet	4/5 stars

=== Track listing ===
No.	Title	Length
1.	"Main Titles"	1:45
2.	"First Crop Circles"	3:15
3.	"Roof Intruder"	2:20
4.	"Brazilian Video"	1:56
5.	"In the Cornfield"	5:40
6.	"Baby Monitor"	1:07
7.	"Recruiting Office"	2:07
8.	"Throwing a Stone"	5:47
9.	"Boarding Up the House"	3:00
10.	"Into the Basement"	5:23
11.	"Asthma Attack"	3:42
12.	"The Hand of Fate (Part 1)"	5:32
13.	"The Hand of Fate (Part 2)"	3:47
Total length:		45:34

=== Critical reception for soundtrack ===
The soundtrack generally received positive reviews. William Ruhlmann of Allmusic stated in his review that:

With Signs, composer James Newton Howard again joins director M. Night Shyamalan for their third collaboration following The Sixth Sense and Unbreakable, and clearly the film presents another thrilling encounter with the supernatural. From his opening "Main Theme," Howard ratchets up the tension, and his music thereafter alternates only between the ominous and the suspenseful. He overloads his lower tones, employing eight basses, five percussionists, and even a tuba, but also uses a large string section for short, fast, repetitive figures meant to keep viewers on the edges of their seats. This is not particularly imaginative music, just good old Saturday afternoon scary movie fare, the only distinguishing characteristic about it – consistent with Shyamalan's style – that it is so relentless. There's just no let up; dread pervades every moment of the director's films, to the point of emotional exhaustion for some, and the score has to have the same uncompromising approach, which can make it a little hard to take when listened to all the way through.

== Reception ==
=== Critical response ===
On Rotten Tomatoes, the film has an approval rating of 76% based on reviews from 241 critics, with an average rating of 6.80/10. The site's critical consensus reads: "With Signs, Shyamalan proves once again an expert at building suspense and giving audiences the chills." On Metacritic, the film scored 59 out of 100 based on 36 reviews, indicating "mixed or average reviews". Audiences polled by CinemaScore gave the film an average grade of "B" on an A+ to F scale.

Roger Ebert gave the film four out of four stars, writing: "M. Night Shyamalan's Signs is the work of a born filmmaker, able to summon apprehension out of thin air. When it is over, we think not how little has been decided, but how much has been experienced ... At the end of the film, I had to smile, recognizing how Shyamalan has essentially ditched a payoff. He knows, as we all sense, that payoffs have grown boring." Geoff Pevere of Toronto Star gave the film a scoring of three out of five stars, saying "Ultimately, Signs – as original, interesting and ambitious as it is – is a post-9/11 movie of possibly the most dubious sort." Nell Minow of Common Sense Media gave the film four out of five stars; she praised the casting and Shyamalan's direction, saying his "only flaw was not leaving anything to the audience's imagination".

Mick LaSalle of the San Francisco Chronicle gave the film one star out of four, thinking that the film had "few thoughts and no thrills." Variety's Todd McCarthy criticized the film for its lack of originality, writing: "After the overwrought Unbreakable and now the meager Signs, it's fair to speculate whether Shyamalan's persistence in replicating the otherworldly formula of The Sixth Sense might not be a futile and self-defeating exercise." A. O. Scott of The New York Times wrote that "Mr. Shyamalan is undone by his pretensions" and that the theme of paternal grief "is articulated here with a heavy-handed, incoherent sentimentality that smothers real emotion." On the theme of faith, he concludes: "Mr. Shyamalan never gives us anything to believe in, other than his own power to solve problems of his own posing, and his command of a narrative logic is as circular – and as empty – as those bare patches out in the cornfield."

In 2004, the Brazilian birthday party scene was ranked at No. 77 on Bravo's The 100 Scariest Movie Moments.

In a 2007 interview, Bong Joon-ho cited the film as an inspiration for his 2006 monster film The Host. He added: "Even though it deals with the alien invasion rather than creatures, I liked the fact that the film focused on the Mel Gibson's family, not on the aliens."

=== Box office ===
Signs grossed $60,117,080 from 3,264 theaters in its opening weekend. At the time of its release, the film had the second-highest August opening weekend, behind Rush Hour 2. It was the biggest opening weekend of Mel Gibson's career, surpassing Ransom, and earned more than Disney's previous best for a live-action non-sequel, not based on existing popular source material, held by Pearl Harbor. The film went on to gross $227,966,634 domestically and $180,281,283 internationally, for a total of $408,247,917 worldwide. It ranked only behind The Sixth Sense in Shyamalan's box office success and grossing more than The Village and Split.

=== Home media ===
Signs was released on VHS and DVD on January 7, 2003.

The DVD release includes some deleted scenes:

- Flashbacks 1 and 2: Two scenes with Graham's wife, Colleen. In the first, she sits with a toddler Morgan and baby Bo in a rocking chair while Graham watches. In the second, she dances with him. She hums the same tune in both scenes.
- The dead bird: With no sound, this scene shows Graham going back home from Ray's, and after a short time, a dead bird near the road (after supposedly hitting an invisible forcefield) is shown.
- The attic door and the third story: The longest deleted scene, it starts with Merrill finding out about the not-boarded attic door. Despite Graham's efforts to call him back, Merrill goes up the stairs and manages to hold the door by climbing up a chair and putting his hands at the door. Trying to help, Graham looks for a way to hold the door. He gets a tall shelf and places it under the door. Knowing this is only a temporary solution, Graham gets his family and takes them to the kitchen and puts some chairs at the door to hold the aliens out of the room. There, he tells the "third story", about Merrill, in which he dislocated his arm. While Graham is telling the story, the shelf is destroyed from the attic door slamming on top of it repeatedly and the aliens gain access to the house. Everyone goes down to the basement, the only safe room available, as the aliens begin forcing the kitchen door open.

In addition to being a THX certified release, the DVD also featured a documentary and storyboards. It was the second top DVD video rental in the United States during the first quarter of 2003, earning $34,700,000 (equivalent to $61,000,000 in 2025) in US DVD rental revenue by March 2003.

== See also ==
- List of films featuring extraterrestrials
