= M. Night Shyamalan =

American filmmaker (born 1970)

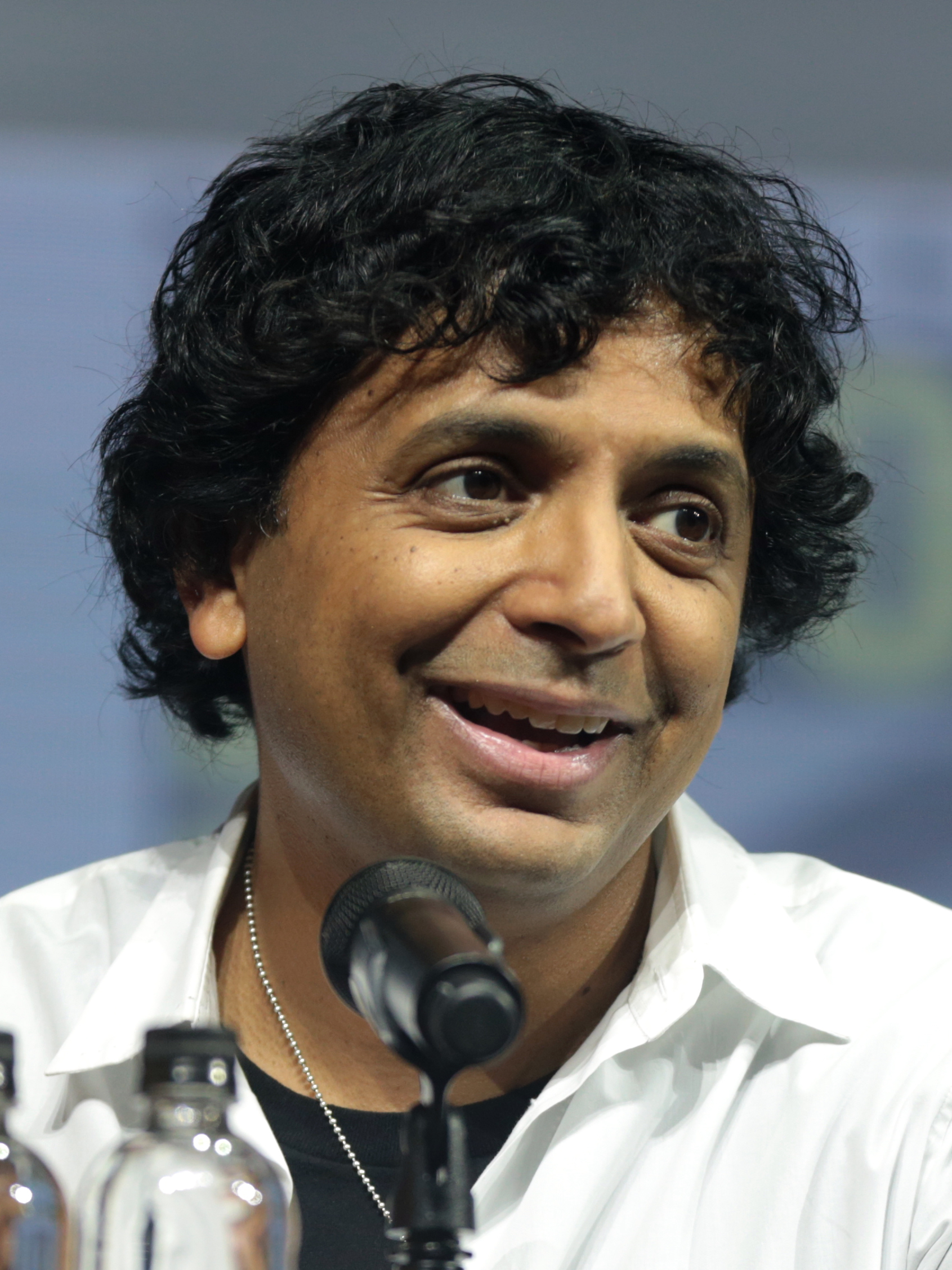
- Shyamalan at the 2018 San Diego Comic Con
- Born: Manoj Nelliyattu Shyamalan; August 6, 1970 (age 56); Mahé, Pondicherry, India
- Citizenship: United States
- Education: New York University
- Occupations: Director; producer; screenwriter; actor
- Years active: 1992–present
- Organization: Blinding Edge Pictures
- Works: Full list
- Spouse: Bhavna Vaswani (m. 1992)
- Children: 3, including Saleka and Ishana
- Awards: Full list

Manoj Nelliyattu Shyamalan (Note: /ˈʃɑːməlɑːn/ SHAH-mə-lahn; Malayalam: [mɐnoːdʒ n̪elːijaːʈːə̆ ʃ(j)aːmɐɭɐn]) (born August 6, 1970), known professionally as M. Night Shyamalan, is an American filmmaker and actor. His films often employ supernatural plots and twist endings. The cumulative gross of his films exceeds $3.3 billion globally. Shyamalan has received various accolades, including nominations for two Academy Awards, two BAFTA Awards and a Golden Globe.

Shyamalan was born in Mahé, India, and raised in Penn Valley, Pennsylvania. His early films include Praying with Anger (1992) and Wide Awake (1998). His breakthrough film, The Sixth Sense (1999), earned him Academy Award nominations for Best Director and Best Original Screenplay. He then released Unbreakable (2000), Signs (2002) and The Village (2004). After a string of poorly received films—Lady in the Water (2006), The Happening (2008), The Last Airbender (2010), and After Earth (2013)—he experienced a career resurgence with The Visit (2015) and Split (2016). These were followed by Glass (2019), Old (2021), Knock at the Cabin (2023), and Trap (2024).

Shyamalan was also one of the executive producers and occasional director of the 20th Television science fiction series Wayward Pines (2015–2016) and the Apple TV+ psychological horror series Servant (2019–2023), for which he also served as showrunner.

== Early life ==
Manoj Nelliyattu Shyamalan was born on August 6, 1970, in Mahé, a town in the Union Territory of Pondicherry, India. His father, Nelliyattu C. Shyamalan, is a Malayali neurologist from Mahé and a JIPMER graduate; his mother, Jayalakshmi Shyamalan, a Tamil from Chennai, is an OB-GYN.

Shyamalan's parents emigrated to the United States when he was six weeks old. Shyamalan was raised Hindu in Penn Valley, Pennsylvania. He attended the private Roman Catholic grammar school Waldron Mercy Academy. He felt like an outsider and remembers that teachers would say that whoever was not baptized would go to Hell. When he was a student there, a teacher once became upset because he "got the best grade in religion class and [he] wasn't Catholic". He later attended the Episcopal Academy, a private Episcopal high school located at the time in Merion Station, Pennsylvania.

Shyamalan earned the New York University Merit Scholarship in 1988, and was also a National Merit Scholar. Shyamalan is an alumnus of New York University Tisch School of the Arts in Manhattan, graduating in 1992. When reading about the Lakota, he discovered a person whose name translated to "night". He used Night thereafter instead of his original middle name, Nelliyattu.

Shyamalan had an early desire to be a filmmaker when he was given a Super 8 camera at a young age. Though his father wanted him to follow in the family practice of medicine, his mother encouraged him to follow his passion. By the time he was seventeen, he had made forty-five home movies.

== Career ==
=== Film ===
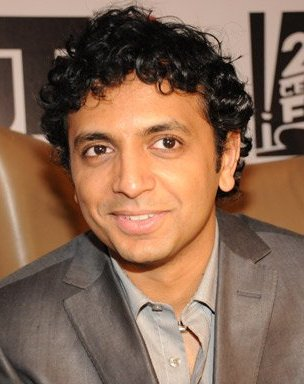
Shyamalan at a press conference for The Happening in 2008.

Shyamalan made his first film, the semi-autobiographical drama Praying with Anger, while still a student at NYU, using money borrowed from family and friends. He wrote and directed his second movie, Wide Awake. His parents were the film's associate producers. The drama dealt with a ten-year-old Catholic schoolboy (Joseph Cross) who, after the death of his grandfather (Robert Loggia), searches for God. The film's supporting cast included Dana Delany and Denis Leary as the boy's parents, as well as Rosie O'Donnell, Julia Stiles, and Camryn Manheim. Wide Awake was filmed in a school Shyamalan attended as a child and earned 1999 Young Artist Award nominations for Best Drama, and, for Cross, Best Performance. Only in limited release, the film grossed $305,704 in theaters, against a $6 million budget.

That same year Shyamalan co-wrote the screenplay for Stuart Little with Greg Brooker. He was the ghostwriter for the 1999 film She's All That, a teen comedy starring Freddie Prinze Jr. and Rachael Leigh Cook, but did not reveal his role until 2013. On June 17, 2013, Jack Lechner (who served as Miramax's head of development in the late 1990s) confirmed that both Shyamalan and R. Lee Fleming Jr. contributed to the script: Fleming wrote the initial script that Miramax bought while Shyamalan did an uncredited rewrite (doing more than "a polish") that got the film green-lit. Lechner reiterated that content from both writers was included in the final cut of the film.

Shyamalan gained international recognition when he wrote and directed 1999's The Sixth Sense, starring Bruce Willis, which became the second-highest grossing horror movie of all time. He became a director whose name could, like Steven Spielberg, market a film. The Sixth Sense was nominated for six Academy Awards, including Best Picture, Best Director and Best Original Screenplay.

In July 2000, on The Howard Stern Show, Shyamalan said he had met with Spielberg and was in early talks to write the script for the fourth Indiana Jones film. This would have given Shyamalan a chance to work with his longtime idol. After the film fell through, Shyamalan later said it was too "tricky" to arrange and "not the right thing" for him to do.

Shyamalan followed The Sixth Sense by writing and directing Unbreakable (2000), again starring Willis, a stealth superhero film within a thriller, which was both critically and financially successful.

Shyamalan's name was linked with the 2001 film Harry Potter and the Philosopher's Stone, but it conflicted with the production of Unbreakable. In July 2006, while doing press tours for Lady in the Water, Shyamalan expressed he remained interested in directing one of the last two Harry Potter films: "The themes that run through it ... the empowering of children, a positive outlook ... you name it, it falls in line with my beliefs", Shyamalan said. "I enjoy the humor in it. When I read the first Harry Potter and was thinking about making it, I had a whole different vibe in my head of it".

His next film, Signs, was released in 2002. The film stars Mel Gibson as a former Episcopalian priest who regains his faith in God during an alien invasion. It was both critically and financially successful and grossed $408 million from a budget of $72 million.

Shyamalan next directed The Village (2004), about an isolated community living in the woods. Although it received mixed reviews, it was financially successful as it grossed $257 million from a budget of $60 million.

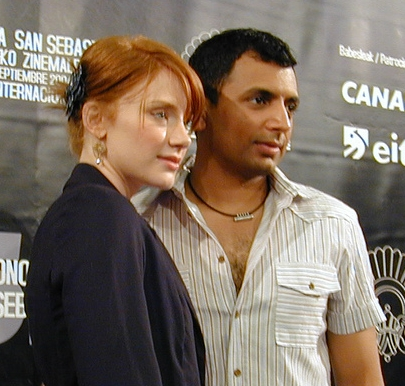
M. Night Shyamalan and Bryce Dallas Howard at the Spanish premiere of The Village (in the San Sebastián International Film Festival, 2006).

After the release of The Village in 2004, Shyamalan had been planning a film adaptation of Yann Martel's novel Life of Pi with 20th Century Fox, but later backed out so that he could make Lady in the Water. In an interview he said about his reasons for dropping out of that project:

I love that book. I mean, it's basically [the story of] a kid born in the same city as me [Mahe, India] — it almost felt predestined. But I was hesitant because the book has kind of a twist ending. And I was concerned that as soon as you put my name on it, everybody would have a different experience. Whereas if someone else did it, it would be much more satisfying, I think. Expectations, you've got to be aware of them. I'm wishing them all great luck. I hope they make a beautiful movie.

Released in 2006, Lady in the Water, a bedtime story about a water nymph and an apartment superintendent, was both critically and financially unsuccessful, only grossing $72 million worldwide from a budget of $70 million.

Next was the film The Happening, a science fiction thriller about an inexplicable natural disaster causing mass suicides, featuring a teacher and his wife fleeing from contaminated cities into the countryside. It was critically unsuccessful but financially successful as it grossed $163 million from a budget of $48 million.

In July 2008, it was announced that Shyamalan had partnered with Media Rights Capital to form a production company called Night Chronicles. Shyamalan would produce, but not direct, one film a year for three years. The first of the three films was Devil, a supernatural thriller directed by siblings John and Drew Dowdle. The script was written by Brian Nelson, based on an original idea from Shyamalan. The movie was about a group of people stuck in an elevator with the devil, and starred Chris Messina. The film was not previewed by critics before its release.

In 2010, he directed The Last Airbender, based on the first season of the Nickelodeon TV series Avatar: The Last Airbender. It was widely panned with the criticism aimed at its casting of white actors in Asian inspired roles, yet was a financial success, grossing $319 million from a budget of $150 million. It is considered to be one of the worst films of all time.

In 2013, Shyamalan directed the film After Earth, based on a script by Gary Whitta and starring Will Smith and his son, Jaden. It was received poorly by critics, but was financially successful, making nearly $244 million against a budget of $130 million. Shyamalan later described his thinking in 2013 as full of doubts, introspection and questioning.

Shyamalan announced in January 2014 that he would be working again with Bruce Willis on a film titled Labor of Love. As of March 2022, and the retirement of Willis, this film had yet to be produced.

Shyamalan's reputation was poor and most Hollywood studios passed on his self-funded, low-budget horror-comedy The Visit, featuring a brother and sister who are sent to their grandparents' remote Pennsylvania farm for a weeklong visit. After revising the film, which Shyamalan had shot in secret, Universal picked up rights to The Visit. The movie went on to gross $98 million worldwide on a budget of $5 million – the fifth-highest grossing thriller film of the year. Universal released the movie on September 11, 2015.

In 2017, Shyamalan released the movie Split. It was both critically and financially successful and grossed $279 million from a budget of $9 million.

In 2019, he released Glass as the final installment in his 19-year trilogy inclusive of previous films Unbreakable and Split. The movie grossed over $247 million worldwide.

His next film, Old, a thriller about tourists who begin aging rapidly on a mysterious beach, was shot in the Dominican Republic and released on July 23, 2021. The film stars Gael Garcia Bernal, Eliza Scanlen, Thomasin McKenzie, Aaron Pierre, Alex Wolff, Abbey Lee, Nikki Amuka-Bird, Ken Leung, Vicky Krieps, Rufus Sewell, Embeth Davidtz, Alexa Swinton, Nolan River, and Emun Elliott. The film received mixed reviews from critics.

In October 2021, Shyamalan announced that his next film Knock at the Cabin would be released in cinemas on February 3, 2023. Knock at the Cabin premiered in New York City at the Rose Hall on January 30, 2023. The film received generally positive reviews from critics and has grossed over $54 million worldwide.

In February 2023, it was revealed Shyamalan's next film, titled Trap, would be released in theatres on August 2, 2024, distributed by Warner Bros. Pictures. The film received mixed reviews from critics and grossed over $85 million worldwide.

=== Television ===
Shyamalan doing a Reddit AMA to promote Servant in 2021

Shyamalan is the executive producer on the Apple TV series Servant. He directed several episodes, including the pilot. Servant was renewed for a second series in advance of the season one premiere. The second season of Servant completed filming in fall 2020 under COVID protocols.

Shyamalan was also instrumental in the creation of the Fox science fiction series Wayward Pines (2015–2016), for which he executive produced and directed the pilot episode. The series became the most-watched show of that summer.

In 2016, TNT first announced that Shyamalan would be responsible for a reboot series for Tales from the Crypt. As of June 2017 the series had been cancelled due to a number of legal reasons.

He also appeared in an episode of the series Entourage.

=== Production company ===
Shyamalan's production company, Blinding Edge Pictures, is located in Berwyn, Pennsylvania. Blinding Edge has produced Servant, Wayward Pines, Devil, The Happening, Lady in the Water, The Village, Signs, Unbreakable, The Last Airbender, After Earth, The Visit, Split, Glass and Old. It is run by Shyamalan and Ashwin Rajan. In February 2023, the company signed a multi-year first-look deal with Warner Bros., among them the Shyamalan-directed Trap, which released theatrically on August 2, 2024.

== Books ==
While working on his film The Happening, Shyamalan developed an interest in improving the delivery of education in American schools. He hired doctoral student James Richardson to do most of the background research and as a result published I Got Schooled: The Unlikely Story of How a Moonlighting Movie Maker Learned the Five Keys to Closing America's Education Gap through Simon and Schuster in 2013. John Willol of NPR reviewed the book by stating "I Got Schooled is a breezily written, research driven call to change America's approach to education. Shyamalan is smart and sincere, and his innovative ideas are unbound by the educational establishment."

== Personal life ==
Shyamalan married Bhavna Vaswani, a fellow student whom he met at New York University. The couple has three daughters, including director Ishana and musician Saleka. His cousin is actor Ritesh Rajan.

Shyamalan and his family live near Philadelphia at Ravenwood, a 125-acre (51 ha) estate, built around a 27,000-square-foot (2,500 m^{2}) 1937 Georgian Revival house.

Shyamalan is a season ticket holder of the Philadelphia 76ers.

In 2023, Shyamalan bought a 218-acre (88 ha) estate from the Rockefeller family in Willistown Township, Chester County, Pennsylvania, which has five historic houses and two barns for $24 million.

Shyamalan was born and raised in a Hindu family, educated at a Catholic school, and most of his movies contain Christian symbolism. Shyamalan considers himself "pretty spiritual," but not religious. "I do have a lot of thoughts about things in that realm beyond what we can touch and feel, but I'm not a huge fan of organized religion," said Shyamalan, "although I'm very fascinated by it, so it comes into my movies a lot."

== Filmography ==
Directed features
Year	Title	Distributor
1992	Praying with Anger	Cinevistaas Limited
1998	Wide Awake	Miramax Films
1999	The Sixth Sense	Buena Vista Pictures
2000	Unbreakable	Buena Vista Pictures
2002	Signs	Buena Vista Pictures
2004	The Village	Buena Vista Pictures
2006	Lady in the Water	Warner Bros. Pictures
2008	The Happening	20th Century Fox
2010	The Last Airbender	Paramount Pictures
2013	After Earth	Sony Pictures Releasing
2015	The Visit	Universal Pictures
2016	Split	Universal Pictures
2019	Glass	Universal Pictures
2021	Old	Universal Pictures
2023	Knock at the Cabin	Universal Pictures
2024	Trap	Warner Bros. Pictures
2027	Remain	Warner Bros. Pictures

Key
†	Denotes films that have not yet been released

== Critical analysis and box-office performance ==
Rolling Stone wrote that The Sixth Sense gave Shyamalan the reputation of "the guy who makes the scary movies with a twist". In 2008, Shyamalan said it was a common misperception that his films "have twist endings, or that they're all scary", explaining that they "are spiritual and all have an emotional perspective". He avoided plot twists for years, until again using them starting with The Visit in 2015. Rolling Stone wrote in 2018,

In his twenties, [Shyamalan] says, "I don't think you could have told me that making thrillers for your whole life wasn't a bad thing. At first it was a sense of, 'Hey, I can make anything.' But that's hypocritical, because when I pick up an Agatha Christie novel in my library, I have a strong expectation. So, I get it ... When I became happy with the idea of making thrillers for the rest of my life, everything went right."

After the release of The Village, Slate's Michael Agger noted that Shyamalan was following "an uncomfortable pattern" of "making fragile, sealed-off movies that fell apart when exposed to outside logic".

Shyamalan has also been nominated for, and in some cases won, numerous Golden Raspberry Awards for Lady in the Water in 2006, The Happening in 2008, The Last Airbender in 2010, and After Earth in 2013. In 2016 he was also nominated for the Razzie Redeemer Award.

The Village, Lady in the Water, Split and Trap have been included in Cahiers du Cinéma annual top ten lists.

Shyamalan is also known for setting and shooting his films in and around Philadelphia, Pennsylvania, along with nearby Reading, Pennsylvania. Most of his early commercially successful films were co-produced and released by Walt Disney Studios' Touchstone and Hollywood Pictures imprints. Films of his resurgence, however, were usually released by Universal Pictures.

=== Critical reception and box-office performance ===
Critical and public response to films from M. Night Shyamalan
Year	Film	Rotten Tomatoes	Metacritic	CinemaScore	Budget	Box-office
1992	Praying with Anger	—N/a	—N/a	—N/a	—N/a	—N/a
1998	Wide Awake	45% (33 reviews)	—N/a	—N/a	$6 million	$305,704
1999	The Sixth Sense	86% (158 reviews)	64 (35 reviews)	A–	$40 million	$673 million
2000	Unbreakable	70% (173 reviews)	62 (31 reviews)	C	$75 million	$248 million
2002	Signs	75% (237 reviews)	59 (36 reviews)	B	$72 million	$408 million
2004	The Village	44% (222 reviews)	44 (40 reviews)	C	$60 million	$257 million
2006	Lady in the Water	25% (212 reviews)	36 (36 reviews)	B–	$70 million	$73 million
2008	The Happening	18% (185 reviews)	34 (38 reviews)	D	$48 million	$163 million
2010	The Last Airbender	5% (192 reviews)	20 (33 reviews)	C	$150 million	$319 million
2013	After Earth	12% (212 reviews)	33 (41 reviews)	B	$130 million	$251 million
2015	The Visit	68% (229 reviews)	55 (34 reviews)	B–	$5 million	$98 million
2016	Split	78% (313 reviews)	63 (48 reviews)	B+	$9 million	$279 million
2019	Glass	37% (395 reviews)	43 (53 reviews)	B	$20 million	$247 million
2021	Old	50% (313 reviews)	55 (52 reviews)	C+	$18 million	$90 million
2023	Knock at the Cabin	67% (216 reviews)	63 (54 reviews)	C	$20 million	$54 million
2024	Trap	57% (230 reviews)	53 (45 reviews)	C+	$30 million	$83 million
Total					$753 million	$3.241 billion

== Awards and nominations ==
In 2008, Shyamalan was honored with the Padma Shri award by the Government of India. Shyamalan was the Jury President of the 72nd Berlin International Film Festival competition section.

== Controversy ==
=== SyFy Channel hoax ===
In 2004, Shyamalan was involved in a media hoax with SyFy Channel, which was eventually uncovered by the press. SyFy claimed in its "documentary" special The Buried Secret of M. Night Shyamalan, shot on the set of The Village, that as a child, Shyamalan had been dead for nearly half an hour while drowned in a frozen pond in an accident, and that upon being rescued he had experiences of communicating with spirits, fueling an obsession with the supernatural.

In truth, Shyamalan developed the hoax with SyFy, going so far as having SyFy staffers sign non-disclosure agreements with a $5 million fine attached and requiring Shyamalan's office to formally approve each step. Neither the childhood accident nor a supposed rift with the filmmakers ever occurred. The hoax included a nonexistent SyFy publicist, "David Westover", whose name appeared on press releases regarding the special. SyFy also fed false news stories to the Associated Press, Zap2It, and the New York Post, among others.

After an AP reporter confronted SyFy Channel president Bonnie Hammer at a press conference, Hammer admitted the hoax, saying it was part of a guerrilla marketing campaign to generate pre-release publicity for The Village. This prompted SyFy's parent company, NBC Universal, to state that the undertaking was "not consistent with our policy at NBC. We would never intend to offend the public or the press and we value our relationship with both."

=== Plagiarism accusations ===
Robert McIlhinney, a Pennsylvanian screenwriter, sued Shyamalan in 2003, alleging similarities between Signs and his unpublished script Lord of the Barrens: The Jersey Devil.

In 2004, Margaret Peterson Haddix claimed that The Village has numerous similarities to her young adult novel Running Out of Time, prompting discussions with publisher Simon & Schuster about filing a lawsuit.

In response to both allegations, Disney and Shyamalan's production company Blinding Edge issued statements calling the claims "meritless".

== Racism ==
After the release of The Happening, The Guardian's Kim Newman questioned, "Can it be a kind of racism that the Indian-born, Philadelphia-raised auteur is hammered for his apparent character (or funny name) rather more than, say, Quentin Tarantino or Spike Lee?" The British Film Institute (BFI) also discussed the impact of racism on Shyamalan's career, pointing to frequent mispronunciations of his last name. By 2017, Vice said that "Shamalamadingdong" had become the "agreed-upon mockery of his name".

BFI asked if critical attacks are the result of egotistical statements on Shyamalan's part. They question whether his strong statements of self-assurance coupled with the remarkable success of The Sixth Sense set up a fall from grace which was soon realized when a run of very successful films (The Sixth Sense, Unbreakable, Signs and The Village) seemingly collapsed with a string of critical failures (Lady in the Water, The Happening, The Last Airbender, and After Earth). In 2019, Tim Greiving of The Washington Post said that "his confidence was interpreted as arrogance by some, especially after he cast himself in Lady in the Water as a brilliant writer whose book is prophesied as a world-saver." Greiving continued, "Howard, who expressed pride in him for forging ahead despite his turn among critics, noted how rare it was for such a young filmmaker to write, direct and produce original material. He wondered whether that placed a bigger target on his back, as his reputation for doggedness was perpetuated within the industry and reinforced by critics."

== In popular culture ==
The 2026 Malayalam psychological dark comedy film Mollywood Times focuses an ardent fan of Shyamalan, and shows how Shyamalan's life (whose origin is tied to Kerala) influences his film-making career.

== See also ==
- List of oldest and youngest Academy Award winners and nominees — Youngest nominees for Best Director
