= After Earth =

2013 American science fiction film by M. Night Shyamalan

- Theatrical release poster
- Directed by: M. Night Shyamalan
- Screenplay by: Gary Whitta; M. Night Shyamalan
- Story by: Will Smith
- Produced by: Caleeb Pinkett; Jada Pinkett Smith; Will Smith; James Lassiter; M. Night Shyamalan
- Starring: Jaden Smith; Will Smith
- Cinematography: Peter Suschitzky
- Edited by: Steven Rosenblum
- Music by: James Newton Howard
- Production companies: Columbia Pictures; Overbrook Entertainment; Blinding Edge Pictures; Relativity Media
- Distributed by: Sony Pictures Releasing
- Release dates: May 1, 2013 (Tokyo); May 31, 2013 (United States)
- Running time: 100 minutes
- Country: United States
- Language: English
- Budget: $130 million
- Box office: $243.8 million

After Earth is a 2013 American post-apocalyptic action-adventure film starring Jaden and Will Smith. The film was loosely based on an original story idea by Will Smith about a father-and-son trip in the wilderness before it was eventually reworked into a sci-fi setting, taking place 1,000 years in the future where humans have evacuated Earth to another planet due to a massive environmental catastrophe.

The film was directed by M. Night Shyamalan, who co-wrote the screenplay with Gary Whitta. Will Smith, his wife Jada Pinkett Smith, his brother-in-law Caleeb Pinkett, and business partner James Lassiter co-produced the film via their company Overbrook Entertainment while Columbia Pictures was the distributor. The film was co-produced by John Rusk, who was also the first assistant director on this film as well as on many of Shyamalan's other films.

The film follows father and son, Cypher and Kitai Raige, who find themselves crash-landing on the abandoned Earth. When Cypher gets injured from the crash, Kitai must travel across the wild environment in search of a backup beacon to fire a distress signal, while having to defend himself from the highly evolved animals, as well as an extraterrestrial creature that detects its prey by smelling fear.

The film was released in IMAX on May 31, 2013. Upon release, After Earth was panned by film critics and made $243.8 million at the box office against a budget of $130 million, becoming a commercial success.

== Plot ==
In the future on a human-populated space colony, Nova Prime, the S'krell extraterrestrial race attempts to take it over with creatures called Ursas, which hunt by "sensing" fear despite being technically blind. Humanity created a peacekeeping military organization, The Ranger Corps, to fight the threat. Their leader, General Cypher Raige, defeats the Ursas with a fear-suppressing technique he called "ghosting". Cypher's daughter, Senshi, was killed during an Ursa assault. Blaming himself for his sister's death, Senshi's 14-year-old brother Kitai trains to become a Ranger like Cypher but is rejected.

Kitai's mother Faia convinces Cypher to take their son on his last mission before he retires. He takes The Ranger Corps off planet to train with a live Ursa, which is tied and immobilized in their spaceship. During flight, the ship is caught in an asteroid shower, causing them to crash-land on Earth, now a desolate and uninhabited planet which humans had evacuated a thousand years earlier due to an environmental cataclysm.

Cypher and Kitai survived the crash, but Cypher's legs are broken, and the main beacon for firing a distress signal is damaged. Cypher instructs Kitai to locate the tail section of the ship, which broke off on entry to the atmosphere. Inside is the backup beacon, which they can use to signal Nova Prime. Cypher gives Kitai his weaponized cutlass, a wrist communicator, and six capsules of a fluid that enhances oxygen intake so he can breathe. Kitai leaves to find the tail section, with Cypher guiding him through the communicator.

Kitai confronts many hazards; bitten by a paralytic leech after fleeing from a pack of baboon-like monkeys, he self-medicates but damages two of his capsules. After awakening, Kitai takes shelter just as the thermal shift arrives, where Cypher tells him a story about how he conceived "ghosting" to kill the Ursas.

Kitai reaches a cliffside waterfall, and Cypher learns about the broken capsules. Knowing that the only way to continue with two capsules would be to skydive, Cypher orders Kitai to abort the mission, but Kitai, believing that his father sees him as a disappointment, refuses to comply after blaming Cypher's absence at home for Senshi's death. Kitai disobeys Cypher's order and skydives down the waterfall but is captured by a large eagle, and his communicator is damaged. In the eagle's nest, Kitai fails to defend her chicks against large panthers before escaping to a river, where he drifts on a raft and a thermal shift nearly freezes him to death. The eagle, who had been following him, shelters Kitai, sacrificing her life.

Kitai reaches the tail section and learns that the ship's Ursa has escaped and killed the rest of the crew. He tries to activate the emergency beacon, but the atmosphere blocks the signal. He climbs up the volcano where he hopes the high altitude will help to activate the beacon, but he encountered the loose Ursa, and it attacks him. Kitai kills it using the "ghost" technique he learned from Cypher. After activating the beacon, he and Cypher are sent back to Nova Prime via a rescue team.

== Cast ==
- Jaden Smith as Kitai Raige
  - Sincere L. Bobb as 3-year-old Kitai
  - Jaden Martin as 9-year-old Kitai
- Will Smith as Cypher Raige
- Sophie Okonedo as Faia Raige
- Zoë Kravitz as Senshi Raige
- Glenn Morshower as Commander Velan
- Kristofer Hivju as Security chief
- Sacha Dhawan as Hesper Pilot
- Chris Geere as Hesper Navigator
- Diego Klattenhoff as Veteran Ranger
- David Denman as Private McQuarrie
- Lincoln Lewis as Bo (Running Cadet)
- Shiva Prabhukumar as Training Cadet
- Isabelle Fuhrman as Rayna (uncredited)

== Production ==
Will Smith conceived the story for the film when he was watching the television show called I Shouldn't Be Alive with his brother-in-law Caleeb Pinkett, who also served as one of the film's producers. It was originally not a science fiction story but about a father and son crashing their car in the mountains or some remote region, with the son having to go out and get rescue for his father. Smith then decided to change the setting to 1000 years in the future, which imposed a higher production budget. The film was also intended to be the first in a trilogy. Smith had his production company Overbrook contact Gary Whitta (who was then known for his script for The Book of Eli) with a simple log line for a film: a father and son crash landed on Earth 1000 years after it had been abandoned by humankind. Impressed with his idea and excited about the opportunity to work with him, Whitta fleshed out Smith's idea and pitched it to him, subsequently becoming the first employee on the project.

A month after the release of The Last Airbender, Smith contacted M. Night Shyamalan on August 6, 2010, to wish him a "Happy Birthday" on his 40th birthday and also to persuade him to direct his film along with his son Jaden as the star. Smith and Shyamalan had planned to work on a film before but it never worked out. Impressed with the entire script, Shyamalan officially made this project—then entitled One Thousand A. E.—his next directorial effort on October 20, 2010, and quietly shelved his own secret untitled project with Bruce Willis, Bradley Cooper, and Gwyneth Paltrow loosely attached. There was another starring role for an adult male, but sources indicated that Smith would not be taking it on. Sony Pictures Entertainment has a first-look deal with Overbrook, so it was expected to be the studio home for A. E. Shyamalan later suggested the film would feature other members of the Smith family, and that it would not be in 3D but he had "an idea for something kind of technically interesting".

In December 2011, Columbia Pictures, a subsidiary of Sony, signed up both Will and Jaden Smith to co-star in the film with Shyamalan directing. Shyamalan, who also co-wrote the screenplay with Gary Whitta, also additionally co-produced the film with Will Smith, Jada Pinkett Smith, Caleeb Pinkett, and James Lassiter. Doug Belgrad, president of Columbia Pictures, made the announcement and said, "Night is an outstanding filmmaker who has a tremendous vision for this science-fiction adventure story and we couldn't be more excited to be working again with Jaden after our experiences on The Pursuit of Happyness and The Karate Kid," and added "We're thrilled to have the two of them together on this project." Shyamalan also added, "The chance to make a scary, science-fiction film starring Jaden and Will is my dream project." Will Smith's decision to take on the starring adult male role required him to step aside in producing and starring in the Hurricane Katrina drama The American Can, and offered the lead role to Denzel Washington instead. The shooting of the movie was also pushed back from September 2011 to January 2012.

On July 25, 2011, Smith travelled to Costa Rica accompanied by an entourage of about 20 people, including Shyamalan, to scout for locations to shoot the film. They visited sites like the Arenal Volcano, hot springs and a lake, and some beaches.

In September 2012, Columbia committed to a June 7, 2013 release date. Shyamalan also scouted locations in Philadelphia. Fifty percent of the filming was to take place at the new Sun Center Studios in Delaware County (Chester Township). Other locations would be in Costa Rica, Utah and Northern California. Shyamalan also visited Valley Forge Military Academy, the filming location of Taps, for research of the film, then entitled After Earth, as Jaden Smith would be playing a military cadet of the future.

The screenplay by Whitta and Shyamalan was later polished by Stephen Gaghan. Jonathan Young, a psychologist and screenwriter, polished the mythic journey structure. As reported by Screen Rant in 2020, "Some scripts sidelined Will completely in favor of his son, Jaden, but Sony wanted him on the big screen as much as possible."

Principal photography for After Earth began in February 2012. Much of the filming took place in Costa Rica, Humboldt County and Aston.

After Earth also became the first film from Sony to be both shot and presented in the emerging 4K digital format. It was primarily shot with Sony's CineAlta F65 camera, which was shipped in January 2012. However, a skydiving sequence required a smaller sized Canon Cinema EOS C500 4K camera mounted on the helmet of a professional skydriver. The cinematographer Peter Suschitzky who picked Sony F65 digital camera for the movie over other digital and film cameras, argued that benefits of film are lost when shown in theaters with digital projectors, as many are today.

On April 19, 2013, Shyamalan then announced that the release date had been moved a week earlier to May 31, 2013 in North America and Korea, which put it against Now You See Me and The Purge, scheduled to open in the United States in the same week. A few days later, the U.S. release of The Purge was rescheduled for June 7, 2013, taking over the slot vacated by After Earth.

== Music ==
On May 3, 2013, it was revealed that Korean-American singer Jay Park would be participating on the official soundtrack of the film in Korea, with a song titled "I Like 2 Party". Then on May 5, 2013, another 30-second snippet of the song was then released with another teaser and trailer.

In July 2012, it was announced that James Newton Howard would score music for the film in his eighth collaboration with the director. An album consisting of Howard's score was released through Sony Masterworks on May 28, 2013.

== Marketing ==
=== Promotional materials ===
The estimated worldwide marketing budget for After Earth was approximately $100 million in addition to the $130 million budget to produce the film. Initial marketing began online with an internet marketing campaign on Facebook and Google+, including a teaser trailer. Alongside the Facebook marketing is a Web 2.0 site that lets people scroll through different images and paragraphs in a complex dynamic way. An image of Jaden's character "Kitai" in costume was released online on February 15, 2012. Later on in the same year, another theatrical teaser was released alongside a trailer for the competing Joseph Kosinski film Oblivion. On March 12, a modified version of After Earth's theatrical teaser was released as the official trailer. The official trailer was broadcast as a TV Spot during late May 2013. The trailer featured the menu music of the video game Deus Ex: Human Revolution, composed by Michael McCann.

In a stark contrast to his previous films, Shyamalan's name was notably absent from several trailers, TV commercials, and marketing signage. Instead, Sony Pictures opted to feature Will and Jaden Smith prominently in the marketing campaign. Sony's worldwide marketing and distribution chairman, Jeff Blake, said that "Night is, without a doubt, a world-class filmmaker who we were thrilled to team up with on this project," but "Together, we decided to focus our campaign on both the action and both Will and Jaden given that 'After Earth' is an adventure story of a father and son." Alex Suskind of Moviefone pointed out to Shyamalan that After Earth was not being marketed on the strength of his name unlike his previous projects, to which he responded, "There's such a specific expectation that comes with a name. It's nice to have people watch the movie and then have them talk about the storyteller; it's a healthy balance."

On April 24, XPRIZE, Sony and Overbrook launched the XPRIZE After Earth Challenge, a robotics competition to promote the May 31 release of After Earth.

The film premiered on May 29 at Ziegfeld Theatre in New York City, with a wide variety of celebrities attending including Bruce Willis, 50 Cent, Spike Lee, and Justin Bieber. Canadian comedian Russell Peters who made fun of Shyamalan when accepting the Razzie Award on his behalf for The Last Airbender also attended and even posed with Shyamalan.

Sony Electronics hosted an exclusive 4K screening of After Earth at the Paramount Studios Theater on Friday May 31 during the 2013 Cine Gear Expo in Hollywood. The event was held for registered Cine Gear Expo attendees and Sony guests from 6:30–9:30 pm followed by a panel discussion with the filmmakers and production team. After guests filled the 500-plus-seat theater, a second screening was held on Saturday, June 1, 2013, in order to accommodate additional guests from 7:30 pm to 9:30 pm.

On June 6, the European Space Agency (ESA) partnered with Sony Pictures International to support the release of the film, stating that it shares common themes in the film of concern for Earth's future and educating the next generation. ESA and Sony are holding the After Earth competition to win the opportunity to go to Bordeaux, France, and have a 'space experience' in weightlessness on a 'parabolic' flight on Novespace's ZERO-G aircraft. The winner would have received paid travel expenses to and from Bordeaux and one night's accommodation for two people and would only be eligible to participate in the reduced gravity aircraft on October 25 following a medical exam.

=== Books ===
Several books were released as supplemental tie-ins for the film:

After Earth: Innocence by Michael Jan Friedman and Robert Greenberger, illustrated by Benito Lobel. Innocence is a prequel comic book to After Earth released by Del Rey Books on November 14, 2012.

After Earth: United Ranger Corps Survival Manual is an illustrated manual that describes the After Earth universe from the history of the United Ranger Corps written by Robert Greenberger. It was published through Insight Editions LLC and released on May 21, 2013. The book also follows humanity's exodus from Earth, and the ongoing battle against the Skrel. It contains the secrets of ghosting, the mastery of the cutlass, a schematic of the Ranger base, a complete guide to the highly evolved animals of Earth, and a handwritten journal entry from Cypher Raige.

After Earth: A Perfect Beast ("The official prequel novel of the epic film After Earth") by Michael Jan Friedman, Robert Greenberger, and Peter David is set nearly 600 years after humanity finds, and colonizes, the planet Nova Prime. The paperback book, published by Del Rey Books on April 30, 2013, is set about 300 years after the last Skrel attack and the Rangers are in danger of being disbanded. Then, the Skrel attack with a new weapon—a bioweapon. The book also contains supplemental stories set just over 400 years further into the future. Main focus is on the Raige family and their Ranger heritage.

After Earth: Kitai's Journal written by Christine Peymani and illustrated by Jason A. Katzenstein is a paperback book with black-and-white illustrations for younger readers released by HarperCollins on May 21, 2013.

After Earth: The Official Movie Novelization by Peter David was released in paperback by publishing company Del Rey Books on May 28, 2013. The book features an expanded story of the film as well as supplemental stories.

=== Video game ===
A video game based on the film was developed by Canadian developer Behaviour Interactive and published by Reliance Games for iOS and Android in 2013, to coincide with the release of the film.

== Reception ==
=== Box office ===
During its opening weekend, After Earth took in $27.5 million in box office receipts in the United States and Canada. Sony Pictures projected a launch of around $38 million, but the actual number was 17% lower than the lowest pre-release expectation of $33 million. It finished in third place behind holdover Fast & Furious 6, an action film, and newcomer Now You See Me, a caper film. Taking into account the popularity of principal actor Will Smith, the disappointing finish led The Wall Street Journal to call it a "flop". Ray Subers of Box Office Mojo noted the $27 million weekend placed it between 2 sci-fi flops of 2012 films with $200 million-plus budgets, Battleship ($25.5 million) and John Carter ($30.2 million), and also drew half of the co-stars' previous openings, Will Smith's Men in Black 3 ($54.6 million) and Jaden Smith's The Karate Kid ($55.7 million). Scott Mendelson from Forbes argued that Sony made a mistake of not using M. Night Shyamalan's name to market the film, writing, "His name on the marquee reflects that you're not going to get a conventional genre film, that there may be something else up its sleeve."

Sony Pictures spokesman Steve Elzer said a weekend take of about $30 million in the United States and Canada would be a solid number for a movie that was not a branded sequel. Sony distribution chief Rory Bruer said "Certainly we would have liked to have done more, but this was always going to be a worldwide play." The Hollywood Reporter reported Sony insiders also estimated a potential loss at about $20 million if the film did not gross high overseas, though estimates of top executives at several other rival studios were much higher. The film ended up losing about $30 million overseas and rival top executives were then proven right. On Jimmy Kimmel Live!, Will Smith admitted he was also disappointed with the box office performance and joked "Here's how I think about it, Jimmy, let's be honest. Three is the new one. You know how many ones it takes to make a 3?" and "It's been almost, like, in over 2 decades since I had a movie that wasn't number one! ... That's over now, buddy! Thanks!"

On the worldwide release the following week, After Earth took in an estimated $45.5 million in 60 overseas markets, narrowly beating Fast & Furious 6 estimates of $45.3 million for the No. 1 spot at the international box office. Including the film's launch in South Korea, After Earth made an estimated total of $48.6 million at the international box office, bringing its worldwide gross to an estimated $95,192,000. Sources for Sony Pictures International Releasing said the overall launch was bigger than debuts in the same territories of Oblivion ($45.1 million), The Last Airbender ($42.7 million) and Jaden Smith vehicle The Karate Kid ($32.3 million). Sony distribution chief Rory Bruer said that Sony was happy with the overseas opening and expects much of the film's ticket sales to come from international markets and "It definitely was the exciting start we were looking for internationally." The film's final numbers were $60.5 million in North America and $243.8 million worldwide.

=== Critical response ===
On Rotten Tomatoes, the film has an approval rating of 12% based on 214 reviews and an average rating of 3.90/10. The website's critical consensus reads, "After Earth is a dull, ploddingly paced exercise in sentimental sci-fi—and the latest setback for director M. Night Shyamalan's once-promising career." On Metacritic, the film has a score of 33 out of 100 based on 41 critics, indicating "generally unfavorable" reviews. Audiences polled by CinemaScore gave the film an average grade of "B" on an A+ to F scale.

Joe Morgenstern, film critic for The Wall Street Journal, opened his review by asking: "Is After Earth the worst movie ever made?" His answer was "Maybe not; there's always Battlefield Earth to remind us how low the bar can go." Like Morgenstern, Manohla Dargis of The New York Times made note of the film's use of central themes in Scientology before concluding the film was nothing more than a "big-screen vanity project". Los Angeles Times reviewer Betsy Sharkey wondered how the elder Smith could have gone from the charismatic performance in the serious film The Pursuit of Happyness, also co-starring his son, to the performance in After Earth. She also saw compounding problems in the creative process leading to a lack of subtlety and nuance: "The script has no nuance, none. And when Shyamalan moves into the director's chair, the script problems are magnified." Scott Foundas of Variety opined that the film was further proof that Shyamalan had become a "director-for-hire", with "his disinterest palpable from first frame to last". Peter Bradshaw of The Guardian gave the film one star out of five, calling it "another uncompromisingly terrible film ... featuring a triple-whammy of abysmal acting, directing and story" and saying that Jaden Smith "plays the role throughout with a face like a smacked bum" and "Kitai [Jaden Smith's character] must be like his dad: show no fear. Or any emotion. Or any acting talent of any sort."

Matt Zoller Seitz of RogerEbert.com awarded the film 3.5 stars out of 4 and commented that the movie is "a moral tale disguised as a sci-fi blockbuster. It's no classic, but it's a special movie: spectacular and wise." Jim Vejvoda of IGN awarded the film a 6.7 out of 10 and commented, "M. Night Shyamalan isn't quite back in top form here, but After Earth is certainly the best movie he's made in years." Charlie Jane Anders of io9 commented that "Having suffered through Last Airbender, I can attest that this film is no Last Airbender... After Earth stays grounded, and manages to tell a pretty decent story."

The special effects received a mixed response. Rene Rodriguez of The Miami Herald said that "the CGI creatures in the film look as fake as the monkeys in Indiana Jones and the Kingdom of the Crystal Skull". Charlie McCollum of the San Jose Mercury News called them "surprisingly unconvincing, a step or two above the effects in those deliberately cheese ball sci-fi flicks the Syfy channel shows on Saturday night." Michael O'Sullivan of The Washington Post called the production design "blandly generic" and the special effects, props and costumes "cheap and slapdash-looking". However, Austin Kennedy of Film Geek Central said the special effects were "top-notch", John Depko and Susanne Perez of Daily Pilot called them "impressive", Nathan Duke of Patch Media said they were "impressive enough", and Peter Feldman of The Citizen described them as "solid".

American astronaut Buzz Aldrin said the movie is "quite action packed" and a "touching father/son story" but is not realistic because "there was a lot of noise. In space, you don't get that much noise," a quote that is highly cited in the news and labeled nitpicking or panning the film. Aldrin was impressed by the set design stating that "the scenes of the cities were really remarkable" but differed significantly from his experience on the moon, which he described as "'magnificent desolation' in contrast to the magnificent experience that humanity could move itself ahead to get to the moon."

=== Will Smith's response ===
In a 2015 interview with Esquire, Smith called After Earth "the most painful failure in his career" and expressed regret over leading his son into the film. He also unfavorably compared the experience to Wild Wild West (1999), which also underperformed expectations at the box office.

=== 4K screening ===
Ryan Nakashima of Associated Press was generally impressed with the film's 4K resolution picture quality, though the visual-effects shots that composed about a third of the movie were done in 2K resolution to save on cost and time. Nakashima commented "I could see details I've never noticed before—the actors' tiny skin imperfections, or Smith's salt-and-pepper whiskers. In a distant shot of Smith's son Jaden running down a riverbed, I was struck by how many small rocks were defined clearly from such a distance. Yet other shots that included computer-generated cityscapes or otherworldly creatures looked less sharp." The cinematographer Peter Suschitzky was apologetic about that, saying "The movie is only half in true 4K. I'm sad about that. It still looks good."

Scott Wilkinson of AVS was similarly impressed by the visual effects (though he did not enjoy the movie itself): "Even sitting too far away, the movie itself looked gorgeous—sharp as a tack with beautiful colors. The smallest details, such as Jaden Smith's character in the far distance, somehow looked clearer than I would have expected under normal circumstances; I got the distinct impression that the image could have been blown up by quite a bit and no detail would have been lost. The CGI animals did look a bit artificial, but that didn't bother me very much at all."

=== Home media ===
After Earth was released on DVD and Blu-ray on October 8, 2013.

== Controversies ==
=== Scientology hypothesis ===
Some critics were struck by what they saw as parallels in the movie's plot, dialogue and imagery with the Scientology teachings of L. Ron Hubbard, particularly those in Dianetics: The Modern Science of Mental Health and Dianetics: The Original Thesis. Similarly, Peter Travers of Rolling Stone compared the film to the "flop" Battlefield Earth, describing the film as "an unholy mess of platitudes and posturing" that wastes the talents and charm of Will Smith. Pointing out Smith's alleged ties to Scientology, including his funding of New Village Leadership Academy, a school that uses Study Tech as its teaching method, Matt Patches of Vulture declared the movie probably the clearest evidence of Smith's investment in Scientology, and detailed how he saw the film paralleling its teachings. The Hollywood Reporter published a guest-column review written by former Scientology member Marc Headley which pointed out similar parallels.

David S. Touretzky, a research professor at Carnegie Mellon and a well-known expert on and critic of Scientology dismissed these perceived parallels: "I don't see any Scientology content at all in this movie." He told Rich Juzwiak of Gawker:

The themes of the movie appear to be standard adventure fare: physical courage, coming of age, father/son relationships, battling danger to prove oneself and earn a father's respect. These are not Scientology themes. There is no mention of evil psychiatrists, mind control, engrams, etc.

Touretzky also addressed multiple points made by the Scientology hypothesis including the film's marketing materials prominently featuring a volcano:

The original version of Dianetics did not have any pictures on the cover. After Hubbard dreamed up OT III around 1967, someone got the idea of putting a volcano on the cover of Dianetics to 'restimulate the engrams' of us nonbelievers and influence us to buy the book. But most Scientologists don't know anything about OT III or why there is a volcano on the cover of some versions of Dianetics.

A parody website cheerupwillsmith.com, which was created for the purpose of cheering up Will Smith with the perceived failure of After Earth, gained some attention in the media. Flyers were also posted in East Village, Manhattan requesting Scientology members to see After Earth a minimum of three times and then upload a positive video for Will Smith on that website. The site has a video mockumentary of two Sea Org members, along their way to see After Earth, recording video praises for Will Smith from strangers and cajoling them into signing a billion-year contract with the Church of Scientology. When they delivered the signatures to a local branch of the church near Times Square, a church representative told them they were impersonating the church and threatened to call the police if they did not leave. The video and the site were created by Jason Selvig and Davram Stiefler of the comedy duo The Good Liars, who had previously pretended to be Time Warner Cable representatives asking people how they could make service worse for customers.

The Church of Scientology International branded the Scientology claims as "silly nonsense" and a myth launched by a handful of self-promoters. The church's director of public affairs, Karin Pouw, stated to TheImproper magazine that "The film and its story line contain themes common to many of the world's philosophies, not unique to Scientology." While Pouw did not dispute the similarities, she countered that overcoming fear has been a universal theme in stories for thousands of years as well central to countless film plots. She noted the same logic would seemingly make Star Wars: Episode I – The Phantom Menace a Scientology-themed movie, as it includes the dialogue, "Fear is the path to the Dark Side. Fear leads to anger, anger leads to hate, hate leads to suffering." Later, domain registrar and web-hosting company Go Daddy took down cheerupwillsmith.com citing "Copyright Infringement, Trademark Infringement, and False Identity." Joe Kloc of The Daily Dot presumes the complaints came from the Church of Scientology.

=== Nepotism allegations ===
There was heavy criticism of Jaden Smith's role in the film. Christopher Orr of The Atlantic stated, "He is entirely lacking in the big-screen charisma that made his father one of Hollywood's major stars." Gary Wolcott of Tri-City Herald commented that "the 15-year-old Jaden doesn't appear to demonstrate much talent and has zero charisma." Alex Pappademas of Grantland referred to After Earth as a "parade-float tribute to nepotism." Mikhail Lecaros of GMA News calls the movie "devoid of common sense and purpose (save for nepotism)."

In response to the nepotism allegations, Gary Susman of Time magazine argued, "In Hollywood, such nepotism is no sin; in fact, it's often a selling point." David S. Cohen of Variety pointed out that "putting family members into projects is hardly new, yet it rarely inspires such vituperation." Abena Agyeman-Fisher of NewsOne.com suggested that the allegations were thinly veiled racism and an example of a double standard being applied to black people. However Charlie Lyne of The Guardian writes that nepotism has traditionally carried a stigma.

== Awards and nominations ==
Year	Award	Category	Nominee	Result
2013	MTV Movie Award	Summer's Biggest Teen Bad Ass Star	Jaden Smith	Nominated
2013	World Soundtrack Award	Film Composer of the Year; Also for The Bourne Legacy	James Newton Howard	Nominated
2014	Golden Raspberry Award	Worst Picture	After Earth	Nominated
2014	Golden Raspberry Award	Worst Actor	Jaden Smith	Won
2014	Golden Raspberry Award	Worst Supporting Actor	Will Smith	Won
2014	Golden Raspberry Award	Worst Director	M. Night Shyamalan	Nominated
2014	Golden Raspberry Award	Worst Screenplay	M. Night Shyamalan and Gary Whitta (screenplay); Will Smith (story)	Nominated
2014	Golden Raspberry Award	Worst Screen Combo	Jaden Smith and Will Smith	Won

== Cancelled franchise ==
In March 2018, it was revealed that After Earth was intended to be the first installment of a new franchise. Pitched to the studio by Will Smith, the intention was to launch a multimedia franchise titled 1000 AE. Loose plans were originally for After Earth to be followed by a sequel and multiple related media, such as a live action television series, an animated television series, webisodes, mobisodes, a video game, consumer products, theme-park attractions, documentaries, comics, an educational program collaboration in partnership with NASA, cologne and perfume lines, and a social media platform. Though Smith wanted 1000 AE to be an immersive experience for the audience, the movie ultimately was poorly received and lost money at the box office. All plans for a continuation were abandoned.
