= Lady in the Water =

2006 film by M. Night Shyamalan

- Theatrical release poster
- Directed by: M. Night Shyamalan
- Written by: M. Night Shyamalan
- Produced by: Sam Mercer; M. Night Shyamalan
- Starring: Paul Giamatti; Bryce Dallas Howard; Bob Balaban; Jeffrey Wright; Sarita Choudhury; Freddy Rodriguez; Bill Irwin; Jared Harris
- Cinematography: Christopher Doyle
- Edited by: Barbara Tulliver
- Music by: James Newton Howard
- Production companies: Legendary Pictures; Blinding Edge Pictures
- Distributed by: Warner Bros. Pictures
- Release date: July 21, 2006
- Running time: 110 minutes
- Country: United States
- Language: English
- Budget: $70 million
- Box office: $72.8 million

Lady in the Water is a 2006 American urban fantasy drama film written and directed by M. Night Shyamalan, who produced with Sam Mercer. The film features the starring cast of Paul Giamatti and Bryce Dallas Howard with Bob Balaban, Jeffrey Wright, Sarita Choudhury, Freddy Rodriguez, Bill Irwin and Jared Harris in supporting roles. Produced by Legendary Pictures and Blinding Edge Pictures and distributed by Warner Bros. Pictures, the film's plot concerns the superintendent of an apartment complex in Philadelphia who discovers a young woman in the building's swimming pool. Gradually, he and his neighbors learn that she is a water nymph (or Narf) whose life is in danger from a vicious and wolf-like mystical creature called a Scrunt that tries to keep her from returning to her watery "blue world".

Lady in the Water was released on July 21, 2006. The film received negative reviews, with criticism revolving around the self-indulgence with which Shyamalan cast himself in the film, the lack of consistency and the film's characterization. The film was additionally a financial failure grossing $72.8 million against a $70 million production budget. At the 27th Golden Raspberry Awards, Lady in the Water received a quartet of nominations for Worst Picture and Worst Screenplay and won a pair for Worst Director, and Worst Supporting Actor for Shyamalan.

== Plot ==
One evening, Cleveland Heep, the superintendent of an apartment complex in Philadelphia, discovers Story, a naiad-like being, in the building's swimming pool. Heep immediately rescues Story from an attack by a Scrunt, a grass-covered and wolf-like creature that hides by flattening its body against the turf. It is additionally revealed that Heep became the superintendent of his building after his family was murdered.

Story, who has come from the Blue World, explains that she has arrived to find the Writer, the "vessel" who will be magically awakened when he meets her, and then write a book that will save humanity in the future. When Heep mentions the word "Narf" to tenant Young-Soon, she recognizes it from stories told by her mother, Mrs. Choi, then summarizes the stories for him.

After questioning residents from around the apartment complex, Heep discovers the Writer is tenant Vick Ran, who is struggling to complete The Cookbook. Heep brings Vick to Story; their meeting eliminates his fear and sharpens his inner voice. She later explains that The Cookbook will contain views and ideas so significant they will inspire a future president, a great Midwestern orator, to greatly change the world for the better. Vick later deduces, and Story confirms, that he will be killed because of the controversial nature of his ideas.

As Mrs. Choi remembers more details of the Narf legend, Heep better understands the situation. The Tartutic, an invincible simian-like trio that serve as the Blue World's peacekeeping force, have forbidden any attack on Story while she travels home. Nonetheless, the Scrunt does just that because they know that Story is destined to be a great Narf leader, the once in a generation Madam Narf who will let all of humanity know they are on the right path.

For Story to recover from her wounds and return safely, she foresees that she will need the help of a Guardian, a Symbolist, a Guild, and a Healer. Story believes Heep to be her Guardian; Heep asks Farber, an abrasive film critic, to help him figure out the others' identities. Working off movie tropes, Farber misadvises Heep, leading him to a flawed conclusion that a resident named Dury is the Symbolist, the smokers are the Guild, and a kindly woman named Bell is the Healer.

Heep confronts the Scrunt, but nearly dies in the process, convincing him he is not the Guardian. The next night, Farber's bad advice leads to their plan's immediate failure. In the confusion, Farber is killed and Story is seriously wounded by the Scrunt. Dury suddenly realizes his son Joey is the real Symbolist. Interpreting the information on cereal boxes, Joey deduces the true Guild is composed of seven sisters, that two new men must be present, and that the Healer is a man, soon revealed to be Heep. Heep goes about healing Story by bringing forth his repressed grief about his family with Story's wounds healing when he confesses to her that he does not want to lose her too.

Story again prepares to depart, but the Scrunt attacks. It is stopped by the gaze of Reggie, a lopsidedly muscled tenant who clearly is the Guardian. Reggie's intense stare and stalking approach intimidate the Scrunt into a slow retreat, but Reggie is distracted by the cry of the giant eagle arriving to transport Story back to the Blue World. When Reggie momentarily breaks eye contact, the Scrunt leaps, but the concealed Tartutic leap out of hiding, grab it, and drag it away.

Story hugs Heep goodbye; he thanks her for saving his life. The eagle lands, enfolds Story in one of its wings and as the residents gaze on, it carries Story up into the night sky.

== Cast ==
- Paul Giamatti as Cleveland Heep
- Bryce Dallas Howard as Story
- Bob Balaban as Harry Farber
- Jeffrey Wright as Mr. Dury
- Sarita Choudhury as Anna Ran
- Cindy Cheung as Young-Soon Choi
- Freddy Rodriguez as Reggie
- Bill Irwin as Mr. Leeds
- Jared Harris as Goatee Smoker
- Mary Beth Hurt as Mrs. Bell
- Joseph D. Reitman as Long Haired Smoker
- Tovah Feldshuh as Mrs. Bubchik
- M. Night Shyamalan as Vick Ran
- Noah Gray-Cabey as Joey Dury
- June Kyoto Lu as Mrs. Choi
- David Ogden Stiers as the uncredited narration heard in the film's prologue

== Production ==
The film was planned to be produced by Touchstone Pictures—just as M. Night Shyamalan's previous four films were released by Walt Disney Studios—but ultimately no deal was reached. Disney executive Nina Jacobson had spoken with Shyamalan about the film's storyline, the idea for which studio chairman Dick Cook didn't understand. Shyamalan was reportedly angry about the response, claiming that Disney "no longer valued individualism". Despite the fact that Disney was willing to completely fund the film regardless, Shyamalan rejected their offer and eventually presented the project to Warner Bros. Pictures, who agreed to finance the film. The events that led to the making of the film were featured in a book, The Man Who Heard Voices, by Michael Bamberger.

Shyamalan established a production facility at the Jacobson Logistics warehouse site in nearby Levittown, Pennsylvania, where sets for the apartment complex and a half-city block of row houses were built. Occasional footage was shot inside the overflow area of the warehouse. Most of the filming was completed after work hours.

=== Music ===
Having already formulated ideas for the score the previous year, James Newton Howard wrote it during the early part of 2006, and the orchestral score was recorded over a period of four days in May by the 91-piece Hollywood Studio Symphony.

== Soundtrack ==
Lady in the Water

Film score by James Newton Howard
- Released: July 18, 2006
- Recorded: May 2006
- Label: Decca
- Producers: Amanda Ghost; Tom Herbers; Oliver Leiber

James Newton Howard chronology
Freedomland	Lady in the Water	Blood Diamond

Professional ratings
Review scores
Source	Rating
AllMusic	3.5/5 stars
Filmtracks	5/5 stars
SoundtrackNet	4/5 stars

The soundtrack was composed by James Newton Howard, conducted by Pete Anthony and performed by the Hollywood Studio Symphony. The last four tracks are non-soundtrack Bob Dylan covers from singer/songwriter Amanda Ghost, indie rock band A Whisper in the Noise, and rock 'n' roll revivalists Silvertide. Howard won the IFMCA Award for Best Film Score for Lady in the Water in 2006, as well as the awards for Best Original Score for a Fantasy/Science Fiction/Horror Film and Best Single Cue of 2006 for "The Great Eatlon".

1. "Prologue"
2. "The Party"
3. "Charades"
4. "Ripples in the Pool"
5. "The Blue World"
6. "Giving the Kii"
7. "Walkie Talkie"
8. "Cereal Boxes"
9. "Officer Jimbo"
10. "The Healing"
11. "The Great Eatlon"
12. "End Titles"
13. "The Times They Are a-Changin'" – A Whisper in the Noise
14. "Every Grain of Sand" – Amanda Ghost
15. "It Ain't Me Babe" – Silvertide
16. "Maggie's Farm" – Silvertide

== Reception ==
=== Box office ===
In its opening weekend (July 21–23, 2006), the film grossed a total of $18.2 million, placing third in the U.S. behind Pirates of the Caribbean: Dead Man's Chest and Monster House. It was Shyamalan's lowest opening for any of his five major films. As a result of the negative reviews and poor word-of-mouth, its second week fell sharply to $7.1 million, pushing its total to only $32.2 million. Its third weekend was no better, falling another 62.1% to $2.7 million. As of 2011, its total was $42.285 million. In addition, the film made only $30.5 million in other territories, bringing its tally to approximately $72.785 million internationally.

=== Critical reception ===
Lady in the Water received predominantly negative reviews from critics upon release. On the review aggregator Rotten Tomatoes, the film has an approval rating of 25% based on 212 reviews, with an average rating of 4.30/10. The site's critical consensus reads, "A far-fetched story with little suspense and unconvincing scenarios, Lady in the Water feels contrived, pretentious, and rather silly." On Metacritic, the film has a weighted average score of 36 out of 100 based on reviews from 36 critics, indicating "generally unfavorable" reviews. Audiences surveyed by CinemaScore gave the film a grade B− on scale of A to F.

Brian Lowry of Variety magazine wrote a scathing advance review that appeared on July 16, 2006. Common complaints about the film were that little effort was put into getting the viewer to believe in the world, that few moments of the film could be taken seriously, and that Shyamalan was using the film as a form of self-indulgence; instead of having a minor cameo, as in most of his films, Shyamalan cast himself as a visionary whose writing changes the world, and another character included a film critic—portrayed by actor Bob Balaban as arrogant, self-assured, and passive—who comes to a violent end. Many reviewers attacked this perceived self-indulgence: Manohla Dargis of The New York Times wrote of the story, "Apparently those who live in the water now roam the earth trying to make us listen, though initially it's rather foggy as to what precisely we are supposed to hear—the crash of the waves, the songs of the sirens, the voice of God—until we realize that of course we're meant to cup our ear to an even higher power: Mr. Shyamalan." Of Shyamalan's role in the film, Mark Kermode said, "It's like someone pouring petrol over their heads and setting fire to themselves."

Frank Lovece of Film Journal International said, "Fans of actor Paul Giamatti or of filmmaker M. Night Shyamalan may get something out of Lady in the Water, a fractured fairy tale about a water nymph who comes to a Philadelphia apartment house to deliver an important message. Anyone else is likely to be perplexed by the muddled mythmaking or actively astonished at the self-indulgent ego of a writer-director-producer who casts himself in the role of a visionary writer whose martyrdom will change the world." Michael Medved gave Lady in the Water one-and-a-half stars (out of four) calling it, "...a full-out, flamboyant cinematic disaster, a work of nearly unparalleled arrogance and vapidity", adding, "...Lady in the Water is all wet..." Also panned was the fact that the film was based on a bedtime story Shyamalan told to his children; Pete Vonder Haar of Film Threat commented: "If Shyamalan is going to use his kids as a focus group for future projects, maybe he should start making movies for Nickelodeon already and stop wasting our time."

CNN's Tom Charity, among others, has called Lady in the Water the worst film of 2006. It was listed by Variety as one of the ten "biggest (financial) losers" of 2006. Wesley Morris of The Boston Globe wrote that though the film is "built on too much ponderous self-regard...[t]here is a good chunk of Lady in the Water that is simply too well made and affectingly acted to dismiss as a mere exercise in arrogance."

The film was ranked sixth in the influential film magazine Cahiers du cinéma's top ten films of 2006, above films such as Terrence Malick's The New World and Martin Scorsese's The Departed.

== Accolades ==
Award		Category	Subject	Result	Ref.
Teen Choice Awards	20 August 2006	Choice Summer Movie – Drama/Action-Adventure		Nominated	
Stinkers Bad Movie Awards	2007	Worst Picture	Sam Mercer	Nominated	
Stinkers Bad Movie Awards	2007	Worst Picture	M. Night Shyamalan	Nominated	
Stinkers Bad Movie Awards	2007	Worst Director	M. Night Shyamalan	Nominated	
Stinkers Bad Movie Awards	2007	Worst Screenplay	M. Night Shyamalan	Nominated	
Stinkers Bad Movie Awards	2007	Worst Supporting Actress	Cindy Cheung	Won	
Stinkers Bad Movie Awards	2007	Most Annoying Fake Accent (Female)	Cindy Cheung	Won	
Stinkers Bad Movie Awards	2007	Worst Ensemble	The entire cast	Nominated	
Stinkers Bad Movie Awards	2007	Least Scary Horror Movie	Sam Mercer	Won	
Stinkers Bad Movie Awards	2007	Least Scary Horror Movie	M. Night Shyamalan	Won	
IFMCA Awards	23 February 2007	Film Score of the Year	James Newton Howard	Won	
IFMCA Awards	23 February 2007	Best Original Score for a Fantasy/Science Fiction/Horror Film	James Newton Howard	Won	
IFMCA Awards	23 February 2007	Film Music Composition of the Year	James Newton Howard ("The Great Eatlon")	Won	
Golden Raspberry Awards	24 February 2007	Worst Picture	Sam Mercer	Nominated	
Golden Raspberry Awards	24 February 2007	Worst Picture	M. Night Shyamalan	Nominated	
Golden Raspberry Awards	24 February 2007	Worst Director	M. Night Shyamalan	Won	
Golden Raspberry Awards	24 February 2007	Worst Supporting Actor	M. Night Shyamalan	Won	
Golden Raspberry Awards	24 February 2007	Worst Screenplay	M. Night Shyamalan	Nominated	
Young Artist Awards	10 March 2007	Best Young Actor – Ten or Under	Noah Gray-Cabey	Nominated	

== Home media ==
Lady in the Water was released simultaneously on DVD, HD DVD, and Blu-ray by Warner Home Video on December 19, 2006. Notably, it is the only M. Night Shyamalan film that was ever released on HD DVD.

== Novelization ==
Lady in the Water, A Bedtime Story children's book

=== Lady in the Water: A Bedtime Story ===
Shyamalan authored a 72-page children's book titled Lady in the Water: A Bedtime Story, illustrated by Mark "Crash" McCreery. This book was released by Little, Brown on June 21, 2006, serving as a companion piece to the film.

The narrative delves into the mythos of the narf, scrunt, Tartutic, and Eatlon, mirroring their roles in the film. It also introduces unique elements not present in the movie, such as the sensations experienced by a vessel upon awakening and the whimsical notion that a narf's presence activates lawn sprinklers. While the book hints at roles like Madame Narf, Healer, Symbolist, Guild, and Guardian, it leaves their specifics to the reader's imagination.

=== The Man Who Heard Voices ===
Journalist Michael Bamberger penned The Man Who Heard Voices: Or, How M. Night Shyamalan Risked His Career on a Fairy Tale, providing an insider's look at the creation of Lady in the Water. The hardcover edition was published by Gotham Books on July 6, 2006, with the eBook version released on July 20, 2006.

Bamberger's account offers a detailed chronicle of Shyamalan's creative process, from script development to on-location filming. It also explores the director's decision to part ways with Disney and collaborate with Warner Bros. for this project. The book provides a candid portrayal of the challenges and triumphs faced during the film's production.
