= Caddo Lake (film) =

2024 thriller film

- Release poster
- Directed by: Celine Held; Logan George
- Written by: Celine Held; Logan George
- Produced by: M. Night Shyamalan; Ashwin Rajan; Kara Durrett; Josh Godfrey
- Starring: Dylan O'Brien; Eliza Scanlen; Diana Hopper; Caroline Falk; Sam Hennings; Eric Lange; Lauren Ambrose
- Cinematography: Lowell A. Meyer
- Edited by: Logan George
- Music by: David Baloche
- Production companies: Blinding Edge Pictures; K Period Media
- Distributed by: New Line Cinema (through Warner Bros. Pictures)
- Release date: October 10, 2024
- Running time: 99 minutes
- Country: United States
- Language: English

Caddo Lake is a 2024 American thriller film written and directed by Celine Held and Logan George and produced by M. Night Shyamalan. It stars Dylan O'Brien, Eliza Scanlen, Diana Hopper, Caroline Falk, Sam Hennings, Eric Lange, and Lauren Ambrose.

The film was released on Max on October 10, 2024.

== Plot ==
Ellie, her mother Celeste, her stepfather Daniel, and her stepsister Anna live on Caddo Lake on the Louisiana-Texas border. Anna vanishes one night while near the lake. The family and community begin searching for her, with no results. Ellie goes searching for Anna on a portion of the lake where the water has receded to a dry lakebed. When returning to land and going back to her mother's home, she discovers she is now three days in the past, when Anna has only just disappeared. In a panic, she returns to the lake and quickly finds Anna, but then realizes she has traveled one month into the past to a previous incident where Anna had run off. Ellie goes back to the lake again in the hope of finding Anna a second time.

Meanwhile, a man named Paris is attempting to find out what caused his mother to have a seizure and drive off a bridge. He works as a dredger. One day, he sees footprints on a receded part of the lake. Following them, he crosses an invisible barrier and temporarily loses his hearing. Returning to his boat, he finds a necklace stuck in the motor. It is the necklace his mother owned. Paris' former girlfriend, a young Celeste, returns, and they rekindle their relationship, but she doubts his story about there being a mystery of the lake.

The stories converge when Paris returns to the lake and goes through portals that take him to 1952. There he finds a wounded Anna and gets her help before attempting to get back to his own time, 2003. Instead, he ends up in 2022, Ellie's time, and takes Ellie's boat, which she had tied up before traveling to the past. He is arrested as a suspect in Anna's disappearance. He sees a news report with a photo of Anna and realizes the girl he saved in the past was his own mother. He escapes from the police, but drowns while trying to return to the lake to go back to his time.

Meanwhile, in 2005, Ellie sees a necklace hanging on a car mirror that matches her mother's necklace. It was a necklace that Anna was wearing when she went missing. She breaks into the car to get the necklace and the car's owner arrives and attacks her, trying to get the necklace back. Ellie asks where the necklace came from and the woman, who is Celeste, says it belonged to her missing boyfriend's mother, Anna Lang. Ellie has been looking for Celeste's boyfriend, Paris.

Ellie realizes the woman is Celeste, and the baby Celeste is holding is herself. Ellie goes to an Internet café and looks up Anna Lang. She realizes Anna is her grandmother, and Paris is her missing-assumed-dead father. She goes back to the lake to return home to 2022.

She returns home to find her mother watching a news report about Paris' escape and death after telling Daniel that Anna is safe. There is a photo of Paris and the authorities are asking for help identifying him. Ellie shows Anna's school picture from 1952 and embraces her mom, explaining that neither Anna nor Paris meant to leave them.

== Cast ==
- Dylan O'Brien as Paris
- Eliza Scanlen as Ellie
- Caroline Falk as Anna
- Lauren Ambrose as Celeste
- Eric Lange as Daniel
- Sam Hennings as Ben
- Diana Hopper as Cee

== Production ==
Caddo Lake is a thriller film written and directed by filmmaking duo Celine Held and Logan George. In August 2021, Dylan O'Brien and Eliza Scanlen were in talks to star in the film, then titled Vanishings, and a casting call was released, revealing M. Night Shyamalan would produce under his production company Blinding Edge Pictures. Shyamalan, Held, and George had previously collaborated on the horror television series Servant. By October 2021, O'Brien and Scanlen were set to star in the film, which had been retitled to The Vanishings at Caddo Lake, and Lauren Ambrose, Eric Lange, Sam Hennings, and Diana Hopper had joined the cast, with filming beginning on October 4 in Shreveport, Louisiana. Held and George sought 1998–2004 period-specific vehicles from locals in order to produce an authentic feel to the story's community. Filming wrapped on November 18, 2021. By May 2023, the title was shortened to Caddo Lake.

== Release ==
Caddo Lake released on Max on October 10, 2024.

== Reception ==
On the review aggregator website Rotten Tomatoes, 78% of 45 critics' reviews are positive, with an average rating of 6.0/10. The website's consensus reads: "A windingly intricate and delirious sci-fi thrill ride washes over the senses and steadily flows through Caddo Lake." Metacritic, which uses a weighted average, assigned the film a score of 55 out of 100, based on seven critics, indicating "mixed or average" reviews.
