= Servant (TV series) =

American psychological horror television series (2019–2023)

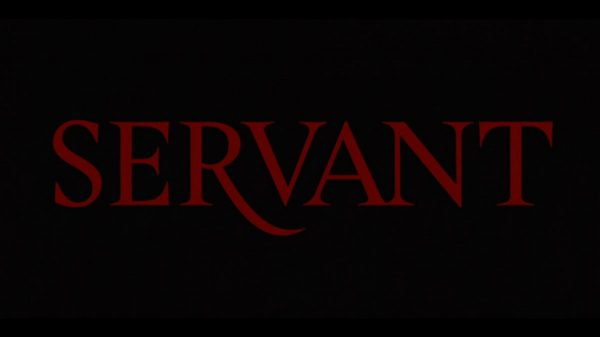
- Genre: Drama; Psychological horror; Thriller
- Created by: Tony Basgallop
- Showrunner: M. Night Shyamalan
- Starring: Lauren Ambrose; Toby Kebbell; Nell Tiger Free; Rupert Grint
- Composer: Trevor Gureckis
- Country of origin: United States
- Original language: English
- No. of seasons: 4
- No. of episodes: 40

Production
- Executive producers: Tony Basgallop; M. Night Shyamalan; Ashwin Rajan; Jason Blumenthal; Todd Black; Steve Tisch
- Production location: Philadelphia, Pennsylvania
- Cinematography: Mike Gioulakis; Jarin Blaschke
- Camera setup: Single-camera
- Running time: 24–36 minutes
- Production companies: Blinding Edge Pictures; Escape Artists; Dolphin Black Productions

Original release
- Network: Apple TV+
- Release: November 28, 2019 – March 17, 2023

Servant is an American psychological horror television series created by Tony Basgallop, with executive producer M. Night Shyamalan acting as showrunner, and produced for Apple TV+. Lauren Ambrose, Toby Kebbell, Nell Tiger Free and Rupert Grint star in all four seasons of the series, which premiered on November 28, 2019, and concluded with the end of its fourth season on March 17, 2023.

The series received critical acclaim, with particular praise for its atmosphere and the performances of the four leads; it received high praise from Guillermo del Toro and Stephen King.

== Premise ==
A wealthy Philadelphia couple, Dorothy and Sean Turner, experience a fracture in their marriage after the death of their thirteen-week-old son, Jericho. The couple undergo transitory object therapy using a lifelike reborn doll after Dorothy experiences a full psychotic break. The doll, which Dorothy believes is her real child, was the only thing that brought her out of a catatonic state following Jericho's death. Six weeks after his death, they hire a young nanny, Leanne Grayson, to move in and take care of Jericho, the reborn doll, opening their home to increasingly unusual occurrences. While Sean deals with the grief on his own, he becomes deeply suspicious of Leanne.

== Cast and characters ==
=== Main ===
- Lauren Ambrose as Dorothy Turner (née Pearce), a local television news reporter and highly overprotective mother who lives under the delusion that her infant son is still alive and well.
- Toby Kebbell as Sean Turner, Dorothy's husband and a stay-at-home consulting chef.
- Nell Tiger Free as Leanne Grayson, a mysterious young nanny from Wisconsin hired by the Turners to look after "Baby Jericho". The series frequently hints that she might possess powers, supernatural abilities that develop gradually and grow stronger every night she stays at the Turners' house.
- Rupert Grint as Julian Pearce, Dorothy's alcoholic younger brother. Despite his discourteous behavior, he frequently helps the Turners.

=== Supporting ===
- Mason and Julius Belford (season 1) and Jack and James Hoogerwerff (seasons 2–4) as Baby Jericho Turner, the firstborn child of the Turners who died just two and a half months after he was born. He is later replaced by a lifelike reborn doll to soothe Dorothy under the delusion that her son is still alive, but inexplicably re-appears alive and well following Leanne's arrival.
- Phillip James Brannon as Matthew Roscoe, a man hired by Julian to help investigate Leanne and protect the Turners. His life is changed after an encounter with the Church of Lesser Saints.
- Tony Revolori as Tobe, Sean's kind-hearted commis chef who has a crush on Leanne.
- Soojeong Son as Wanda (Season 1), a babysitter whom Leanne befriends.
- Boris McGiver as "Uncle" George, a member of the Church of Lesser Saints bent on bringing Leanne back to the cult, and posing as her uncle to the Turners.
- Jerrika Hinton as Natalie Gorman (season 1–2), Dorothy's close friend and therapist who suggested the reborn doll as a temporary coping method, and one of the only people outside of the family to know about Jericho's death.
- Molly Griggs as Isabelle Carrick (season 1–3), an up-and-coming reporter at 8News where Dorothy works.
- Todd Waring as Frank Pearce, Dorothy and Julian's father and Jericho's maternal grandfather.
- Alison Elliott as "Aunt" May Markhem (season 1–2, 4), George's wife and the leader of the Church of Lesser Saints, who poses as Leanne's aunt to the Turners.
- Victoria Cartagena as Officer Stephanie Reyes (season 2, 4), a police officer who interacted with the Turners when Jericho died.
- Billy Vargus as Walker Roush (season 2–4), a news anchor for 8 News.
- Katie Lee Hill as Kourtney (season 2–4), Frank's much-younger girlfriend.
- Barbara Sukowa as "Aunt" Josephine (season 2), a member of the Church of Lesser Saints.
- Sunita Mani as Veera (season 3), Julian's girlfriend and a recovering drug addict.
- Mathilde Dehaye as Snake (season 3–4), a homeless person in the park who left the Church of Lesser Saints to worship Leanne.
- Joshua De Jesus as Milo (season 3), a homeless person part of Snake's group.
- Mac Rop as Lou (season 3–4), a homeless person part of Snake's group.
- Carmen Herlihy as Nancy (season 3), a minister Sean has been seeing.
- Brian K. Landis as the Tall Man (season 4), a member of the Church of Lesser Saints
- Barbara Kingsley as Roberta "Bobbie" (season 4), a live-in nurse for Dorothy's sick-nurse who is also a spiritual medium.
- Denny Dillon as Beverly "Bev" (season 4), Dorothy's other live-in nurse.

=== Guest ===
- M. Night Shyamalan as a Delivery Guy ("Reborn").
- Nadia Alexander as Sylvia, Tobe's verbally-abusive girlfriend hoping to get a job from Sean ("Ring").
- Carmen M. Herlihy as Nancy, Sean's minister from Liberty Unitarian ("Tiger" & "Fish").
- Frank Wood as Dr. Dale Mackenzie, a psychologist who is a friend of Frank ("Commitment").

== Episodes ==
Season	Episodes	Originally released	
Season	Episodes	First released	Last released
1	10	November 28, 2019	January 17, 2020
2	10	January 15, 2021	March 19, 2021
3	10	January 21, 2022	March 25, 2022
4	10	January 13, 2023	March 17, 2023

=== Season 1 (2019–20) ===
No. overall	No. in season	Title	Directed by	Written by	Original release date
1	1	"Reborn"	M. Night Shyamalan	Tony Basgallop	November 28, 2019
Eighteen-year-old Leanne moves into the Philadelphia home of Dorothy and Sean Turner as a nanny for "baby Jericho"—a reborn doll. Following the apparent crib death of the real Jericho at thirteen weeks old, Dorothy suffered a psychotic break and catatonia, and an unlicensed therapist suggested the doll as a coping method. The deluded Dorothy, who acts as though the doll is real, enthusiastically welcomes Leanne into their home as she returns to her own job. Sean, alone in his grief, is uncomfortable around the devoutly religious Leanne, who also acts as though the doll is real. After Leanne puts Jericho down for a "nap", Sean discovers the doll's crib contains a living baby.
2	2	"Wood"	Daniel Sackheim	Tony Basgallop	November 28, 2019
Leanne appears mystified when Sean demands to know whose baby is in his house, telling him that it's his son. Dorothy acts "normally" when she sees Jericho, as though he'd never died. While both women are sleeping, Sean attempts to take Jericho out of the house, but is suddenly unable to disarm the security system. He confides in Julian, Dorothy's younger brother who, along with their father Franklin, is one of the few who knows Jericho died. Sean destroys a homemade straw cross Leanne hung above Jericho's crib. He begins finding painful splinters all over his body and loses his sense of taste. Dorothy begins having flashes of catatonia, recalling the state she was in after Jericho's death six weeks earlier.
3	3	"Eel"	Daniel Sackheim	Tony Basgallop	November 28, 2019
Leanne passes out while watching Sean, a chef, kill and prepare eels in the kitchen. Using the address from her application letter to Dorothy, Julian and a private investigator, Roscoe, go to Medicine Bridge, Wisconsin, to investigate Leanne. They discover a burned-out house that belonged to the Grayson family, and graves for Leanne, who was born in 2001 and died in 2007, and her parents, Stephan and Laura, who also perished in the house fire. Julian believes Leanne is an imposter who is trying to get money from the family through blackmail. Leanne begins to emulate Dorothy.
4	4	"Bear"	Nimród Antal	Tony Basgallop	December 6, 2019
After realizing Leanne is taking Jericho into her own bedroom at night, Sean installs a nanny cam in her room to spy on her. Flashbacks reveal Dorothy suffered multiple miscarriages before Jericho was born. Dorothy decides to take Leanne and Jericho to work with her to meet her coworkers, but Sean intervenes and insists Jericho is too young. However, while watching Dorothy reporting live from a murder trial, Sean spots Leanne in the background with Jericho, watching Dorothy. Leanne watches a DVD from 2011 of Dorothy's reporting, which appears to show Dorothy interviewing a young Leanne at a children's pageant.
5	5	"Cricket"	Nimród Antal	Tony Basgallop	December 13, 2019
Dorothy sends Leanne on an errand so she and Sean can be intimate. Sean later snaps at Leanne after she brings up a yellow onesie from the basement. Feeling hurt by the couple, Leanne writes their names in her Bible before her evening prayers. Dorothy later wakes up with a cold sore and Sean gets another unexplained splinter. Julian tries to drive Leanne out of the house by playing pranks on her, including filling her bedroom with crickets and replacing her tomato soup with dog food. Wanda, seemingly another nanny taking care of a neighbor's daughter, befriends Leanne. However, when Leanne visits Wanda's supposed employer, she learns the family does not have a nanny or a child. When Wanda returns to the house, Leanne induces an allergic reaction in her charge with one of Sean's dishes and withholds her epi-pen, forcing Wanda to confess that she was hired by Julian to question Leanne and convince her to leave. Enraged, Leanne nearly lets the girl die before injecting her with the epi-pen. That night, as a crying Leanne flogs herself with a discipline, a dead cricket in the room returns to life.
6	6	"Rain"	Alexis Ostrander	Tony Basgallop	December 20, 2019
Sean leaves on a business trip. After Leanne receives a card in the mail with "Found you!" scrawled inside, her bizarre Uncle George arrives. He unnerves Dorothy by exhibiting strange behavior and announces that Leanne is returning with him. Dorothy insists he spend the night during a rainstorm, with Julian also staying at Sean's behest. Julian and Dorothy are alarmed to discover Jericho lying on the floor of his bedroom and George curled up like a baby in the crib. The following day, Leanne insists on staying, and Uncle George relents but says he will return with her Aunt May, whom she cannot refuse. He gives the Turners a hand-carved chef marionette in honor of Sean, which Sean later finds hung from Jericho's mobile.
7	7	"Haggis"	Alexis Ostrander	Tony Basgallop	December 27, 2019
Natalie, Dorothy's friend and kinesiologist, is the "therapist" who suggested the reborn doll to bring Dorothy out of her catatonic state following Jericho's death. After a session with Dorothy, Natalie discovers that the Turners hired a nanny for the doll. Later, Natalie hears a baby cry and goes into Jericho's room, but Leanne attacks her and flees with Jericho before she can see that he is a living baby. Dorothy invites Natalie over for dinner. There, Natalie intends to confront the Turners about their prolonged use of the doll, while Sean and Julian struggle to hide the living baby from her. Dorothy becomes convinced that Natalie, Sean and Julian want to talk her out of returning to work and becomes defensive. When Leanne is in the basement retrieving wine, a crack appears in the concrete floor. Natalie hears a growl, enters Jericho's room, and discovers the baby. She is then chased out by an Irish Wolfhound, which Julian eventually kills. Explaining the real baby to Natalie, Julian claims it belongs to Leanne and may be adopted by the Turners. Julian is still disturbed by Jericho's death, having seen something especially upsetting that day. Natalie comforts him and they have sex before going home together. Leanne takes her Bible into the room with the dead dog, which then exits the house alive.
8	8	"Boba"	Lisa Brühlmann	Tony Basgallop	January 3, 2020
Tobe and Leanne go out bowling, while Sean and Dorothy go out to a news awards gala. Julian has to stay home to babysit, but avoids the nursery, constantly thinking of the day of Jericho's death when he saw something traumatic there. As Jericho's baby monitor is unusually quiet, Julian checks on him, only to find him missing and replaced again with the doll. Panicked, Julian calls Sean, but their video chat is interrupted by Dorothy before he can explain what happened. He also contacts Roscoe, who is keeping tabs on Leanne and Tobe, but nothing seems out of the ordinary. When Tobe brings Leanne back to the house, she tries to kiss him, but he pulls away. Inside the house, Julian confronts Leanne about the doll and her past in Wisconsin. Leanne is dismissive of Julian's questions, and resumes treating the doll as a real baby like she did before it was replaced. She also continues to ask about Jericho's death and what Julian saw. Julian holds the doll over the banister, threatening to drop it. When he does so, he hears a baby's cry and catches the doll, then starts searching for the baby in the house, to no avail. He calms down and starts talking about the day Jericho died. The doll is then replaced by the real baby again. On a nearby street, Tobe runs into Wanda carrying a cradle. Sean and Dorothy return, and Julian admits to Sean that he told Leanne the truth about Jericho's death.
9	9	"Jericho"	M. Night Shyamalan	Tony Basgallop	January 10, 2020
In a flashback, Jericho is born at home in a tub and Dorothy's placenta is kept in the freezer. While Sean is away judging a cooking show, Dorothy struggles to take care of a loud and colicky Jericho during a heat wave, causing sleep deprivation and strain to her mental state. After bringing groceries in from her car one afternoon, Dorothy forgets to close the front door. Jericho is quiet for the rest of the day, but that night Dorothy discovers his crib empty. Dorothy then realizes that she forgot Jericho in the car while bringing in the groceries; he has been left there for hours. Dorothy returns to the car and finds Jericho dead from hyperthermia, causing her to enter a catatonic state. Alone in the house, she tends to Jericho's corpse as if he were still alive for the next four days, until Julian arrives and discovers what happened. In the present, Dorothy's car alarm continuously goes off due to Leanne controlling it in an effort to remind Dorothy of Jericho's death in the car. Leanne confronts Sean, who now knows that she is aware of the details of Jericho's death. Leanne condemns Dorothy, blaming her for what happened. Sean defends Dorothy, blaming himself for leaving her alone at a time when she needed his support. Nonetheless, Leanne refuses to let Dorothy hold the living baby that night.
10	10	"Balloon"	John Dahl	Tony Basgallop	January 17, 2020
After Jericho's baptism, the Turners and the guests return to the house for a reception. Sean prepares a pastry dish including Jericho's placenta for the oblivious guests. Julian sees Uncle George in the background of footage of the baptism rite at the church, and instructs Roscoe to keep watch outside the house in his car. However, both George and his companion Aunt May have already infiltrated the house. May confronts Leanne in the nursery, demanding that she bring the baby home, while George convinces Sean to pray with him. Dorothy is troubled by a girl's doll among the guests. The police arrive at the reception looking for the girl, who is actually a runaway. May and George depart without incident, but Dorothy encounters May and recognizes her. Going through tapes of her old newscasts, she finds a story identifying the woman as May Markham, the leader of a cult called the Church of the Lesser Saints who supposedly died in a fire along with most of her followers after a standoff with the ATF. Sean loses his sense of feeling along with taste, and holds his hand over a stovetop burner until it is scorched. May and George return to the house at night, confronting Roscoe, whose car is later shown empty. Tobe leaves a balloon tied to the doorknob of Leanne's room. Leanne leaves the house with this balloon and her suitcase. She is greeted outside by people standing in the street who encircle her in a group hug. When a passing police officer spots the huddle and backs up to investigate, they vanish in seconds. Dorothy discovers Jericho replaced by the doll in his crib. No longer seeing the doll as a real child, she drops it.

=== Season 2 (2021) ===
No. overall	No. in season	Title	Directed by	Written by	Original release date
11	1	"Doll"	Julia Ducournau	Tony Basgallop	January 15, 2021
No longer convinced by the reborn doll, Dorothy calls the police to report "Jericho's kidnapping", still believing him to be her real baby. Before the police arrive, Sean hides traces of the baptism reception. One arriving officer, Stephanie Reyes, was also a first responder after Jericho's death. Sean, Julian and Natalie feed her the cover story that Dorothy saw the doll as her baby up until now, and believes that Jericho is missing because her mind rejected the doll. Reyes is skeptical about their story, but maintains the pretense that Jericho is still alive for Dorothy's benefit. The officers leave, disregarding Dorothy's story about May Markham and the cult. Sean finds Leanne's Bible left behind, with his name written next to a passage about the "test of leprosy". Sean resolves to find Jericho, but he and Julian continue to suppress Dorothy's efforts to spread the story of his disappearance, throwing out her missing persons posters of Jericho, May and Leanne when sent to post them around the neighborhood. Julian also recycles the doll, and steals Jericho's shoe from his room. Using the shoe, he sends the Turners a fake ransom note reading "Tell no one, baby lives" to stop Dorothy's search. Sean later sees the doll in a recycling truck, and takes it back into the house to bathe it, using the therapeutic doll for its intended purpose.
12	2	"Spaceman"	Julia Ducournau	Nina Braddock & Tony Basgallop	January 22, 2021
Four days after Jericho's disappearance, Julian is staying in the house. He finds the bathwater running in the empty bathroom. His baptism gift, a spaceman suit for Jericho, arrives late, and Julian puts it on the doll. Dorothy continues to research the cult. When called to co-anchor her news show, she agrees not to say anything that would alert the cult, but recites the news stories in a soothing and motherly voice in the hope that Jericho is watching, making the other anchor uncomfortable. Roscoe reappears and wakes up in his car outside the house, believing that he just fell asleep for one night. Sean and Julian convince Natalie to hypnotize him, believing that he repressed memories of the past four days after being brainwashed by the cult. Roscoe recounts the cult taking him to a dark room and a story of a man with a hook for a hand removing a baby's eyes. Sean does not believe the story, but Julian is shaken. Meanwhile, Dorothy ends her broadcast with an announcement that Leanne Grayson is missing. Leanne calls the house, asking Sean why they are looking for her and why he has not told Dorothy the truth about Jericho's death. Cracks form in the basement, and liquid seeps through.
13	3	"Pizza"	Ishana Night Shyamalan	Nina Braddock & Tony Basgallop	January 29, 2021
In a flashback, complications with her pregnancy force Dorothy to stay off her feet until childbirth. She stays in bed for the duration while Sean takes care of her. An oven mitt left by the stove catches fire, setting off the smoke alarm while Sean is out. Rather than calling him, Dorothy walks downstairs to put the fire out. As Sean returns home, Dorothy says that she "handled it". In the present, a sinkhole has opened up in the basement of the Turner home. This goes unremarked upon, though Julian slips and drops a wine bottle into it. After Dorothy's newscast, the Turners field alleged sightings of Leanne. One report leads to a gated mansion, which Dorothy finds suspicious. To get inside, the Turners create a fake pizza delivery service and leave a menu on the gate. Eventually, the mansion's owners order twenty-two pizzas, which Dorothy suspects are for the cult members. Sean sends Tobe undercover as the delivery boy, with a camera attached to his lapel so the Turners and Julian can watch. The order turns out to be for a boys' soccer team hosting a party there. Tobe encounters Leanne, apparently working as a caregiver for the sickly, bedridden homeowner, but there is no sign of Jericho. After Tobe leaves, Leanne places an individual order of her own for one pizza. Dorothy insists on making this pizza herself. Tobe returns to the mansion with this second delivery and confronts Leanne, asking why she left the Turners. Leanne says that Dorothy is selfish and cruel and begs Tobe not to tell the Turners that he found her. Leanne then collapses. Dorothy calls Tobe, revealing that she drugged the last pizza without anyones's knowledge and orders him to bring the unconscious Leanne back to the Turner house. Dorothy tells Sean and Julian that she "handled it".
14	4	"2:00"	M. Night Shyamalan	Tony Basgallop	February 5, 2021
Having kidnapped Leanne, Dorothy locks her in the disused attic of the Turner house. She asks about Jericho's location, but Leanne pleads ignorance. Dorothy hides the attic key and forbids Sean from speaking to Leanne, believing that she will manage to manipulate him. Leanne decorates the attic with items she finds, like an old mannequin and an analog metronome. Dorothy begins waking up at exactly 2:00 a.m. each night in a panicked frenzy, during which she physically abuses Leanne while asking about Jericho's location. Confused by this pattern, Dorothy starts to suspect that she has some form of repressed memory regarding Jericho. While Dorothy is at work, Sean finds the key and visits Leanne, bringing her gourmet meals while asking her more gently about Jericho. Leanne remains steadfast, and reminds Sean that the real Jericho is dead. Sean returns Leanne's bible to her, and she later prays at the page where his name was written. During dinner with Dorothy and Julian, Sean's sense of taste returns. On her fourth night of captivity, Leanne anticipates Dorothy's 2:00 a.m. routine and leaves the mannequin in her bed as a decoy, ambushing Dorothy and striking her in the head with the metronome before fleeing. Dorothy corners Leanne at the front door. Leanne admits to knowledge of Jericho's whereabouts, claiming that she and the cult are protecting him from Dorothy. Enraged, Dorothy strikes Leanne unconscious. Sean is woken up by the pain in his burned hand as his sense of feeling returns. With Dorothy absent from their room and the attic empty, he searches the house, finding that Dorothy has buried Leanne alive in the basement sinkhole. Sean digs Leanne out, accusing Dorothy of going too far. 2:00 a.m. was the moment Dorothy woke up and remembered Jericho the night after she left him in the car.
15	5	"Cake"	Lisa Brühlmann	Tony Basgallop & Nina Braddock	February 12, 2021
Leanne is still captive in the Turner home, though they allow her to walk freely inside the house at certain times of day. Remorseful for her actions, Dorothy invites Tobe over to keep Leanne company, providing him with the cover story that they abducted Leanne to save her from a cult and deprogram her. A package arrives in the mail under Sean's name—a baby figurine and a ransom note for $200,000. Sean initially suspects Julian, who pleads ignorance. The Turners pool their resources, including a package of cash Sean and Julian had set aside for a ransom scenario. Sean also sells his beloved espresso machine to reach the $200,000 mark. That night, while Sean and Dorothy take the money to the mall as instructed, Julian stays at the house along with Leanne, who bakes a cake with help from Tobe. Leanne places the figurine in one of the cakes, reminiscing about how her alcoholic mother would make her follow the same recipe and always take the prize of the "baby" for herself. She has Tobe hide in the attic, showing him that the Turners have been locking her in there. Julian calls the Turners, who receive no contact from the kidnappers at the mall. When Julian speaks to Sean alone, they realize that Leanne managed to access Sean's laptop and place the order. Julian confronts Leanne, who explains this wild goose hunt was more punishment for Dorothy. Uncle George appears at the mall, confronting the Turners. They bring him back to the house, where he demands to know where Leanne is. In the attic, Leanne devours the cake in search of the figurine while the lights around her flicker and pop.
16	6	"Espresso"	Isabella Eklöf	Tony Basgallop & Nina Braddock	February 19, 2021
Uncle George demands Leanne be brought back to the house from which she was kidnapped, secretly promising to heal Sean in return. He claims that he and Leanne are people who were "given a second chance at life" to serve others and says that Leanne was not supposed to come to Sean and Dorothy with Jericho, which is why he was taken. In flashbacks, Sean brings home a new coffee maker and gets invited to be the judge on a cooking competition show, initially declining because he has to care for Jericho but later agrees, leaving Dorothy alone with the baby. Dorothy tries to bribe George to leave, but he takes the money to the flooded basement and dumps it in the hole where Dorothy buried Leanne. He finds a strand of Leanne's hair there and becomes afraid, praying and suggesting that the flood is a divine punishment for Leanne being in the house. Sean tries to sneak Leanne out of the house, while she explains that George is lying and will not bring Jericho back no matter what. They are stopped by a news report on TV mentioning gunfire at the Marino house, where Leanne was taken from. The whereabouts and status of that family are unknown.
17	7	"Marino"	Nimród Antal	Ishana Night Shyamalan	February 26, 2021
Upon hearing the news on TV, Leanne tortures herself and George becomes unresponsive. Officer Reyes' unannounced visit forces the Turners to hide George. It is reported that the bodies of the Marino couple have been found but that their son, Sergio, is missing. Reyes insists on searching the house, but fails to find George. She, however, discovers in the attic straw crosses made by Leanne. Reyes reveals that she came to warn Sean of Dorothy's deteriorating mental state which is similar to that of Mr. Marino, who had failed to cope with his wife's sickness and had harmed his family. A note was found at the crime scene, written by Mr. Marino, indicating that Sergio's body should be searched. After Reyes leaves, Leanne finds out that Sergio's body was recently discovered having been shot by his father. She infers that she could have stopped the homicides if she had been there. Eventually, the Turners receive a wooden box addressed to George. It contains a Betamax tape, a note saying 'Reunite them by Christmas' Eve', a dagger, and vials. After learning that the body of Sergio Marino was found, Leanne tears down the crosses and apparently rebels against God as the skylight in the attic shatters.
18	8	"Loveshack"	Isabella Eklöf	Story by : Nina Braddock; Teleplay by : Nina Braddock and Ishana Night Shyamalan	March 5, 2021
While assuring the Turners for Jericho's return, George begins collecting the 'ingredients'. Roscoe then appears and shuts the couple out. He reveals that George strictly asked him to do so. Dorothy confronts George, who desires isolation for the 'process' and reassures her to expect a reunion when 'the clock turns'. Sean's hand begins to heal from the paste George made him. Meanwhile, Julian tries to bond with Leanne when he finds out that the burned house was actually hers. Leanne discloses that her mother was cruel to her so she burned her dress, causing the fire. Julian convinces her that he ignored Dorothy's calls when Jericho died and he is the person to be blamed. Both of them sharing guilt, they have sex. George plays a song and starts to bang his head on the wall in Leanne's previous room. When he finds out Leanne is sleeping with Julian, Leanne confronts him. She accidentally shoves a candle on the floor, creating a wall of fire between herself and George. When she declares she can deal with May, an intimidated George assures her that May is not the woman she has to be afraid of but someone else entirely. Stressed, George runs out of the home only to be hit by a car as Leanne watches from the window.
19	9	"Goose"	Nimród Antal	Tony Basgallop	March 12, 2021
Leanne tells the Turners that George left, leaving them oblivious to the confrontation and car accident the previous night. Expecting Jericho to be returned on Christmas Eve, Dorothy prepares for his return by hosting a family gathering. In attendance are the Turners, Julian, Leanne, Frank, and his younger girlfriend Kourtney. Frank and Julian explain the situation with Jericho in its entirety to Kourtney before they arrive, but she has difficulty following it. Sean, who has gradually moved from an antireligious attitude to belief in God, says grace before the Christmas dinner and implores God to bring Jericho home. Throughout the night, Julian indulges heavily in alcohol and hides in the bathroom to snort cocaine while ducking calls from Natalie. Leanne confronts him about their sexual encounter, hoping to continue their affair, but Julian refuses, claiming it was a bad idea because he's "not right in the head". Returning to the bathroom once more, Julian overdoses and Kourtney finds him dead. Sean attempts CPR but is unsuccessful, during which time Dorothy arrives from a mysterious trip to the basement and looks at Julian's body with horror. Leanne also arrives and revives Julian with methods that ambiguously resemble CPR. Julian claims that he saw Jericho while he was dead, and the baby seemed "fine". After the Christmas guests depart, Leanne discovers that Dorothy was in the basement creating a noose out of Jericho's clothes, to commit suicide if he is not returned to her. A woman arrives at the house wearing a veil and asks Sean if he is looking for Jericho.
20	10	"Josephine"	Ishana Night Shyamalan	Ishana Night Shyamalan	March 19, 2021
The woman in the veil introduces herself as Josephine. She speaks to Dorothy, hinting at the truth of Jericho's death and showing her the onesie he died in. Troubled by this, Dorothy locks herself in Jericho's nursery. Josephine then lures Sean to another room, locking him inside before she confronts Leanne in the attic. Josephine plays the Betamax tape for Leanne, an instructive Church of Lesser Saints video on the process of "purifying" wayward members by ritualistically mutilating, blinding, and killing them before burning the bodies. Josephine refers to this video as a warning and instructs Leanne to pray with her. When instructed to forget about Dorothy, Leanne flees to the basement and prays alone there. Sean's door unlocks and he goes to the nursery, where a despondent Dorothy now believes the Church has killed Jericho, and is preparing to commit suicide. Sean pleads with Dorothy and successfully talks her down. In the basement, Josephine attempts the "purification" process on Leanne, but Dorothy arrives and knocks Josephine out with a shovel. In that moment, Leanne promises to reunite Dorothy with Jericho. When Dorothy leaves the basement to retrieve Sean, Josephine attacks Leanne again, but Leanne stabs her through the eye with a red-hot knife. The basement sinkhole is later shown filled with burning coals, and Josephine nowhere to be found. Sean attempts to tell Dorothy the truth about Jericho's death, but they are interrupted by singing on the baby monitor. They find Leanne cradling a living Jericho in the nursery. Leanne declares that the Turners are her family. Later, back in her spare room, Leanne talks to herself, referencing a growing darkness in her and declaring war on the cult. The power goes out along the street, and Josephine's burnt corpse is shown behind the wall of Leanne's room.

=== Season 3 (2022) ===
No. overall	No. in season	Title	Directed by	Written by	Original release date
21	1	"Donkey"	M. Night Shyamalan	Ryan Scott	January 21, 2022
Three months after Aunt Josephine's visit and mysterious baby Jericho's spirit's return to his body, Leanne is paranoid. Believing the cult is coming for her, she refuses to leave the Turner House. Julian, now sober and finished with rehab, accompanies Leanne on a walk with Jericho, though she is terrified. Julian tries to break up with her, but she says she likes their relationship and doesn't want Julian to change. She then mistakes a stranger for Uncle George and goes back inside with Jericho. As Julian goes to follow her inside, a chunk of the gargoyle adorning the front of the house falls off and shatters on the sidewalk, nearly hitting him. Dorothy gives Leanne a two-piece bathing suit. The next day, Dorothy, Jericho, Sean, Julian and his girlfriend Veera, leave to go to the beach, though Leanne insists on staying behind. She sits in the basement with her blank diary until the mud in the sinkhole starts to bubble. Leanne scribbles what appear to be check marks all over the page. While Leanne is cleaning, doors begin to close on their own and she hears strange noises. She drinks wine and invites Tobe over, but he is busy. Dorothy FaceTimes Leanne to check in, and she mentions Julian was attacked by a flock of rabid seagulls. Leanne finds her diary on the floor of the hallway, and realizes the check marks she drew were a flock of birds. She hears a noise and finds a man rifling through the drawers in the master bedroom. She hides in the closet and calls Sean to explain the situation. He says he will call the police. Leanne leaves the closet and steps on a creaky board, alerting the man. She hides in the crawl space in her bedroom, where Aunt Josephine's body still remains, covered in moths. They swarm Leanne and the man leaves. Leanne sets off an alarm on her phone in the bathroom to lure the man inside, and she closes the door. She tells the man, who she thinks is part of the cult, that he can choose not to be a part of it. Distracted by the police arriving, Leanne accidentally lets the man escape. The Turners arrive back to the house shortly after, and the family is informed that the intruder's M.O. is consistent with a string of burglaries in the area. Leanne later realizes that her dagger is amongst the stolen items. Dorothy tells Leanne they will install security cameras. As the episode ends, Leanne watches a moth on her lampshade.
22	2	"Hive"	Ishana Night Shyamalan	Ishana Night Shyamalan	January 28, 2022
The Turners install an expensive security camera system. Dorothy hosts a mommy-and-me gathering without consulting Leanne first. Leanne hesitantly allows Dorothy to host the party. Leanne hallucinates that the camera technician has her dagger, but it is just a screwdriver. The guests arrive, including a man named Riley Smiley for the infants. Leanne is wary of him. One of the mothers asks Dorothy a few prodding questions about Julian's prior substance abuse, and even asks about seeing an ambulance at the Turners house last summer, which was when Dorothy had carelessly left Jericho to die in the car. Leanne hallucinates that the mothers are cult members. She then discreetly checks the mothers' backs for scars while they are in downward dog, finding one peeking out of the tank top of one of the mommies. Startling her, she flies to the kitchen-only to run into Sean, who spills his blood-thickened dish on her. While upstairs washing off her clothes, she sees a mother in her room looking under her bed. Leanne confronts her, Julian and Veera come in to see the ruckus. The mother claims she was not snooping and the baby dropped the pacifier, and pulls one out of her pocket in a maneuver to make it appear she picked it off the ground. Julian tells Leanne she's overreacting. Later, Leanne returns to the living room to find it devoid of guests except for Mr. Smiley. Leanne becomes convinced Mr. Smiley is a cult member and threatens him with a knife when he refuses to stop approaching her. The mothers return from their walk outside as Leanne demands Mr. Smiley show her his back. There are no scars. Dorothy apologizes to the group. She gives a toast to motherhood. Suddenly, hundreds of bees fly out of the fireplace. Everyone runs out of the house. The exterminators determine the beehive must have fallen in the chimney when the cameras were being installed. Julian suspects Leanne. Later, while Leanne brushes Dorothy's wet hair, Dorothy admits that she feels cursed while Leanne says everything happens as it is supposed to, but Dorothy appears uncertain.
23	3	"Hair"	Carlo Mirabella-Davis	Alyssa Clark	February 4, 2022
A flashback shows Julian discovering Jericho dead in his crib, causing him to vomit. He weeps in sorrow and fear as he had tried to revive his catatonic sister. In the present, he and Veera decide that they should prove that Jericho is actually Leanne's baby. Dorothy leaves for work with blonde hair to cover a news story on a Marilyn Monroe lookalike contest. Later, Sean takes Leanne to the park. She is not as paranoid, but when Sean gives spare change to a stranger, Leanne says she wants to go home. Dorothy returns that evening and puts Jericho to bed, although Leanne isn't happy about it. The next day, Julian meets with Roscoe. He convinces Roscoe to call in a favor to a friend of his, who will analyze Leanne, Dorothy, and Jericho's DNA. The stranger from earlier walks past the two of them. Sean brings food to her and another homeless woman, although he finds them a bit off-putting. Roscoe tells Julian via FaceTime that he needs the DNA (hair samples) within thirty minutes, and that he is visiting a relative. Another flashback shows Julian tearfully calling his father the night of Jericho's death and asking for help. Back in the present, Julian sneaks into the nursery and pulls out one of Jericho's hairs. He searches Leanne's bedroom for her hair, but finds none. Leanne walks in on him looking under her bed. Julian attempts to rekindle their relationship and pulls out a few strands of Leanne's hair. Upset, she makes him leave. Julian searches for strands of Dorothy's hair, eventually finding her hairbrush in the living room. Roscoe arrives and Julian gives him the hair. Leanne watches from a distance. The stranger from the park knocks on the back door and asks Sean if he can use his bathroom. He lets him. When he leaves the bathroom, Dorothy sees him and screams, causing the stranger to run out of the house. Dorothy decides her next story should be about the homeless in the local park. She attempts to interview them, but only one out of the three is willing to share any information. The story becomes more about Sean doing good in the community by helping the homeless. The family happily watches the story air on TV. The DNA results arrive and Julian informs Dorothy that Jericho is not her biological son. Dorothy becomes convinced Julian is using again. A woman from the mommy-and-me group arrives to collect her diaper bag she left, and she notices her hairbrush on the kitchen table—the same brush Julian got "Dorothy's hair" from. Dorothy sternly tells Julian not to do anything like that ever again. Later, Leanne notices the three homeless people staring at her from outside, indicating that they are indeed from the Church of Lesser Saints.
24	4	"Ring"	Dylan Holmes Williams	Laura Marks	February 11, 2022
Tobe comes with his new girlfriend Sylvia, who happens to be very rude to him, as assistants in Sean's lunch. Sylvia has donned a silver-and-red ring that will not come off. Leanne tries to tell Tobe that Sylvia does not care about him, but does not listen and returns to work. A tense situation causes Sylvia to fall and catch her ring finger on a catch that cuts it off entirely. Leanne takes little Jericho out of the kitchen as Sean and Tobe try to find her finger. Tobe accidentally activates the disposal in the drain, causing it to be destroyed. Only able to find the ring, Tobe faints. In the evening, Julian shows Sean how Dorothy zoned out during her interview with a street artist and runs humiliated as she has begun lactating. She returns home in tears and Leanne hugs her as Dorothy takes her son upstairs to breastfeed him. She tells Sean how she thinks that the universe wants to hurt her and the feeling she is getting that something is not right. In the attic, Leanne is shown to have the ring and dances seductively to songs Dorothy played earlier during their aerobics. Outside, several more homeless people have gathered looking right at her.
25	5	"Tiger"	Logan George and Celine Held	Henry Chaisson	February 18, 2022
At a block party for feeding the homeless, Dorothy ignore Julian's warnings about the cult probably watching and takes baby Jericho for his television debut to undermine her friend Isabelle for replacing her as Channel 8 reporter. Dorothy meets Nancy, who introduces herself as Sean's minister; Sean later tells Dorothy that he has been attending church services and that raising Jericho in the Church is now important to him. Dorothy responds to Sean that she has invited the Unitarian minister to dinner. Finally feeling relaxed for once, Leanne and Tobe dance and win a llama during a game. In a face-painting booth, Leanne asks for a tiger that covers the right half of her face. She overhears Isabelle and the black-haired mother of baby Matthew from the mommy-and-me group talking about the ambulance that came for Jericho's demise the previous summer. Leanne says how rude it is to talk about people behind one's back, to which the mother replies that it is just as rude to eavesdrop and leaves. Isabelle googles Leanne, and finds the missing poster that Dorothy had made before Christmas. Wanting to get more food, Leanne instead finds her dagger that was stolen and is attacked by two people who chase her in the Turner house, breaking the glass on the door. Leanne puts her bloody overalls in the washing machine and assures Dorothy that nothing has happened. She gives the llama to Jericho, and goes to the bathroom, where she flashbacks to her terrifying predicament, and then places some of her blood on her forehead.
26	6	"Fish"	Kitty Green	Amy Louise Johnson	February 25, 2022
Sean begins his day with prayer. Leanne, sleeping in until noon, has nightmares of the night she was attacked by members of the Church of Lesser Saints. Dorothy comes into her room and is happy that Leanne is now making an effort at opening herself up more. Sean has started praying, much to the chagrin of his wife who thinks that Sean is wasting his time in "throwing the Lord down their son's throat." She prepares for the dinner party for Sean's minister friend Nancy while Sean hears yet another call from the producers of Gourmet Gauntlet. Dorothy is delighted and tries to get Sean to accept the time on the cooking show. Julian, however, reminds Sean that the last time he had left to be on that show had cost them Jericho; that accepting would unmistakably wake Dorothy up from her "sleeping beauty" routine. Checking the security cameras, Dorothy sees the attack and confronts Leanne as to why she kept her in the dark about such a horrifying experience; certain it was the cult. When Nancy finally does come, Leanne is surprisingly rude and indifferent towards her. Sean has prepared several fish dishes, having forgotten that Nancy is vegan. Dorothy arrives with baby Jericho, and notices Leanne's leg shaking due to her nervousness of their guest's presence. As they eat, Nancy brings up the time Sean was on the show "last season" which Dorothy, of course, has blocked out of her mind as it was the time she had found Jericho dead. Sean and Julian cover up her confusion under the pretense that Dorothy has "the worst memory whenever she even gets a bit jealous" and even had "forgotten her own brother's birthday three times". Leanne continues to antagonize Nancy by claiming that God would not fix her because of what she had done. Humiliated, Nancy leaves and demands that Sean stay away from her. Julian had found out that Nancy had attacked her own aging mother, who was afflicted with dementia, in 2012. After putting baby Jericho to bed, Dorothy watches a Gourmet Gauntlet episode but quickly closes her laptop, confused as to why she cannot remember such a time. In the attic, Sean tries to assure Leanne that he and everyone else is on her side. He says that he believes that God had brought his son back through her, to which Leanne contradicts him, saying that God himself was not involved in Jericho's return to life. Confused, Sean asks her who did but she does not give an answer. Leanne tells Sean to go ahead and take the job on Gourmet Gauntlet since they will be fine with her there to protect Jericho this time. She leaves Sean alone to ponder her response.
27	7	"Camp"	Celine Held & Logan George	Kara Lee Corthron	March 4, 2022
Sean's promo for Gourmet Gauntlet impresses Dorothy and Leanne. Leanne takes nine-month-old Jericho for his walk as Dorothy chastises Julian for sleeping with Leanne, to which he assures her that it is over. Dorothy tells him about Leanne being attacked and how confused she, Dorothy, is at being unable to recall Sean ever being on Gourmet Gauntlet; afraid that she is losing her mind. Julian covers this to her being under a whole lot of stress, something Dorothy takes as part of postpartum depression. At the park, Leanne sees the group of "homeless people" who present her with a necklace and tell her how Jericho is a miracle child, which implies that they are aware that Leanne had actually managed to return the infant's spirit to his body all on her own. Seeing this from a window, a thoroughly panicked Dorothy runs and takes her child. She forbids Leanne to return to the park, which Leanne compares Dorothy's controlling nature to May Markham's. Sean disregards Dorothy's increasing paranoia regarding Jericho's safety as he prepares dinner and she leaves upstairs. Leanne tells Sean that the homeless people she has visited appear to almost worship her to the point of wanting to learn from her rebellious nature for being able defect from the Church of Lesser Saints cult. Wanting to be rid of Leanne for good, Dorothy sweet talks Leanne into taking a two-month dance course in New Jersey, which Sean is not pleased about as Dorothy did not consult him on such a sudden decision. Undeterred, Dorothy accuses Sean of gaslighting her, which he does not react to, as it is true since Jericho's premature death the previous summer. The next morning, Julian tries to tell Dorothy that she is making a grave error at making Leanne leave, which Dorothy dismisses to "how it should be." However, as Leanne is about to leave, Dorothy screams at seeing the reborn doll in place of Jericho in his high chair. Everyone frantically searches the house at hearing crying from different parts. Veera breaks up with Julian and leaves, as he had used her personal history as a weapon. Fully aware that Leanne's departure is linked to Jericho's sudden disappearance, Sean prays to God holding the lifelike doll. Leanne puts her coat on the rack, and Dorothy furiously orders to her to tell her where Jericho is as Leanne knows what she is capable of. Leanne simply replies that Jericho has been safe and sound in the nursery the entire time. Dorothy weeps over finding Jericho and Sean comforts her. He tells Dorothy that Leanne is to remain, as he does not want to lose his son again. Profoundly panicky, Dorothy warns Sean about a "plan being set in motion" but he ignores her and apologizes to Leanne on Dorothy's behalf and that she can stay as long she likes. As she returns to her room, Leanne thanks Dorothy for attempting to broaden her horizons, but that she could never leave Jericho as anything could happen to him if she was not around.
28	8	"Donut"	Dylan Holmes Williams	Alyssa Clark	March 11, 2022
Leanne takes on a leadership role with the homeless encampment, whose inhabitants seem to be runaways from the cult. At home, Dorothy is cold toward Leanne and refuses to let her touch Jericho, as well as making Sean sleep on the couch for as long as he refuses to kick Leanne out. Isabelle starts showing up near the house and speaking to Leanne, offering to befriend her and bond over their shared grievances with Dorothy. Isabelle later calls an ambulance on a homeless man she claimed was sleeping nearby, and Leanne spots her speaking to a paramedic and pointing at the Turner home. Isabelle confronts Dorothy, apparently having pieced together the truth about Jericho, but Dorothy misunderstands and believes Leanne accused her of kidnapping during the pizza incident. Leanne tries to dissuade Isabelle from pursuing an investigation into Dorothy and Jericho, but Isabelle is adamant. That night, Dorothy invites her father and Kourtney over for what Sean hoped would be a private celebration dinner for the couple to watch the premiere of his new show. A moody Dorothy changes the channel to jealously watch Isabelle covering a police standoff, and they see Isabelle killed by a stray bullet on camera. Dorothy sees Leanne smile at this, and Leanne later disposes of a bag of donuts Isabelle had brought to the house.
29	9	"Commitment"	Veronika Franz and Severin Fiala	Laura Marks and C. Henry Chaisson	March 18, 2022
Dorothy asks Leanne about her smiling at Isabelle's death, and Leanne says that Isabelle only wanted to hurt Dorothy. Leanne and Julian have sex on the back patio, unaware that Dorothy is watching them on the security camera; Dorothy later confronts Julian, who suggests she make peace with Leanne. Dorothy, meanwhile, continues to refuse to let anyone other than her, including Sean, hold or care for Jericho. When Dorothy refuses a breakfast cooked by Sean and instead has cereal, she finds insects in the cereal bowl. Later, when Leanne leaves to go to the park, Dorothy looks through her belongings and sees a drawing of her whipping herself with a drop of blood on it. Dorothy sees the same scars on her back and asks Leanne about them, but Leanne insists she does not hurt herself or listen to the cult any more. Dorothy convinces her dad to bring a psychiatrist friend of his to the house to evaluate Leanne for commitment. The doctor speaks to Leanne and Dorothy each by themselves. After he speaks to Dorothy, Frank shows up at the house, and Dorothy learns that her father sent the doctor over to evaluate her, not Leanne. Frank and the doctor suggest sending her away for some rest while Sean and Julian object, but Leanne shows up and convinces them to keep Dorothy in the house, manipulating Dorothy into finally letting her hold Jericho in order to do so. Frank and the doctor relent, and the doctor gives Dorothy trazodone before leaving. Dorothy curls up alone in the bathroom as she hears Leanne singing to Jericho.
30	10	"Mama"	Ishana Night Shyamalan	Ryan Scott	March 25, 2022
When Dorothy wakes up the following morning after being given trazodone, Sean and Julian show her support against her father's actions. Leanne tells Dorothy that she is going to help her no matter what, says that she forgives her for trying to get her sent away, and pleads her to stop fighting her. Dorothy appears to accept this and starts to act more friendly towards Leanne, but Sean and Julian both do not believe it to be genuine. The next morning, Leanne takes Dorothy with her on her walk into the park with the "homeless people". There, Leanne tells Dorothy of a new job opportunity as an anchor that one of her friends found, but Dorothy doesn't believe they'll accept her. Later in the tub, Jericho says "mama", his first word, seemingly to Dorothy. However, Dorothy then realizes that Jericho was looking over her shoulder, possibly speaking to Leanne. Dorothy cooks dinner that night for herself, Sean, Leanne, and Julian, and they all seem to be in good spirits. After dinner, Dorothy reconciles with Sean, and they kiss in their own bed. Outside the Turners' house, Roscoe converses with Uncle George, who is alive and out of the hospital, and George tells him that the house is rotting. When Sean falls asleep, Dorothy attempts to run away from the house with Jericho, but Leanne stops her and wakes up Sean and Julian. When Dorothy tells them she is leaving, Leanne apologizes to her, and the railing behind Dorothy then gives out due to a termite infestation. Leanne grabs Jericho, but Dorothy falls to the ground floor, slamming her back into multiple railings that shatter on the way down. Still breathing on the floor but unable to move, she can see Leanne looking down at her, holding baby Jericho protectively.

=== Season 4 (2023) ===
No. overall	No. in season	Title	Directed by	Written by	Original release date
31	1	"Pigeon"	Dylan Holmes Williams	Henry Chaisson	January 13, 2023
Leanne prepares the house to welcome a paraplegic Dorothy when one of the Church of Lesser Saints cult members attack her by spraying her eyes with holy water. Leanne locks herself in the car to escape more members. When she thinks the coast is clear, she runs for the townhouse but is attacked. She locks herself in the car again. A flock of aggressive pigeons suddenly appear and begin attacking the members of the Church. Leanne goes back inside, just in time for Dorothy's arrival who flatly ignores her presence.
32	2	"Itch"	Kitty Green	Alyssa Clark	January 20, 2023
Leanne begins to torment Dorothy as chaos roams around Spruce Street, Philadelphia, from a bedbug infestation. Dorothy aggressively refuses Leanne's kind aid and, with Kourtney's help, she has two nurses named Beverly and Roberta move in to accelerate her recovery and keep Leanne away from her by any means.
33	3	"Séance"	Ishana Night Shyamalan	Ishana Night Shyamalan	January 27, 2023
Dorothy hires two live-in nurses to accelerate her recovery and protect her from Leanne. One of them, Roberta, is a spiritual medium who conducts a séance to help Dorothy finally heal by beginning to accept what has happened to her and move forward. It is during this ritual that Bobbie hears a baby (Jericho) crying, wondering why no one comes to help him. Leanne presents the dagger that she procured in the third season and attacks Bobbie under the assumption she is hiding scars as proof of flogging by the Church. In her room, Julian demands to know just how far she would have gone had Bobbie truly been a member of the cult, to which Leanne assures her boyfriend that she would have killed her without mercy or hesitation. Outside, it is shown that further, wider cracks have appeared in the street and that within the house a moving cloud of shadow appears, seemingly in the shape of a human. Terrified, Dorothy awakes to see Leanne asleep in her bed, which terrifies her, as it was what Dorothy herself had done when her alcoholic mother was alive whenever she had nightmares as a girl.
34	4	"Boo"	Dylan Holmes Williams	Amy Louise Johnson and Ishana Night Shyamalan	February 3, 2023
As Leanne hunts her enemies on Halloween, Sean finally starts to see her true colors, which leads him to join forces with Dorothy to finally get rid of Leanne. A concerned George warns Matthew Roscoe of Leanne being a potential danger to the whole world.
35	5	"Neighbors"	Carlo Mirabella-Davis	Kara Lee Corthron	February 10, 2023
The Turners learn of Church members becoming undercover neighbors to annihilate Leanne. Determined to find out who the undercover neighbors are leads the Turners into throwing a party for everyone on the block. However, their plans of stopping Leanne goes south as the Church members fail to capture Leanne, as Leanne telekinetically causes a sinkhole to emerge in front of the Turner household.
36	6	"Zoo"	Celine Held & Logan George	Devin Conroy and Ishana Night Shyamalan	February 17, 2023
The Turners' half birthday party for one-and-a-half-year-old Jericho turns quite ugly as the Church of Lesser Saints starts becoming more aggressive in putting an end to Leanne's power over the Turners' and her increasingly powerful otherworldly, psionic abilities by enacting the Satanic ritual to "save" her troubled spirit.
37	7	"Myth"	Ishana Night Shyamalan	Henry Chaisson and Ishana Night Shyamalan	February 24, 2023
Dorothy is further agitated upon discovering that Leanne's coming to their home was no coincidence. Sean and Julian are visited by George who finally reveals "the truth" about Leanne. George claims Leanne is just an ordinary young woman who developed a psychotic obsession with Dorothy during an interview for the 2011 beauty pageant; perceiving Dorothy as the loving mother she never had. He assures Sean and Julian that the loss of taste Sean had last fall and winter was merely Leanne putting a certain pill in his dinner, and that Beverly had died from a snakebite at the petting zoo birthday party. To top it all off, George finally reveals that the "Jericho" the Turners have had since early September 2019 is the child of a deceased homeless drug addict Leanne had found and had been passing off as Jericho ever since. Jericho would be snuck in and out through a hidden tunnel whenever Leanne saw fit to torment the Turners. Sean and Julian are thoroughly stumped by these revelations as they contradict all of their suspicions of Leanne being a supernatural being whom they earlier referred to as a reborn "fallen angel" as a byproduct of the Faustian Bargain tale. Upstairs, Dorothy fails to find anything on Leanne from her 8 News studio and discovers that Leanne has been stalking her since the death of her unloving mother Laura. At dinner, no one speaks of what they have been doing and seemingly have a fun family dinner. Sean suddenly admits that he is planning to leave Gourmet Gauntlet, to which Leanne is quite against. Finally, Julian snaps at Leanne, saying Sean can do whatever he wants. Irritated, Leanne warns the Turners to be very careful. George is revealed to still be a member of the cult, and is seen flogging himself, and begging for God's forgiveness. He says he regrets all the deception, but that it is necessary to give the Turners the strength to return "the Fallen One" to the cult.
38	8	"Tunnels"	Nimród Antal	Laura Marks	March 3, 2023
Sean and Julian now come to a final decision, and confront Leanne about the psychotic influence she has had on their lives as a sudden freakish downpour comes down on all of Philadelphia; something that people at the news station think is just a freak act of Mother Earth and nothing more. Up in the attic, however, Leanne knows otherwise. Now using a walker, a gradually recovered Dorothy hears a noise from Jericho's bedroom, which puzzles her as she has her young son next to her in his crib. Finding the window wide open during such a heavy rainstorm, she comes to close it and is unnerved to see Leanne so calm and meditating. Leanne again asks Dorothy why it is so difficult to like her, to which Dorothy wonders to why did Leanne seek only her attention and approval out of all the thousands of people in Philadelphia. Leanne dodges the question and informs Dorothy that even Sean and Julian no longer like her and that she feels all alone. Downstairs, Sean and Julian debate the best way to get Leanne to where her "uncle" awaits to take her back to where she belongs. Convinced that the rainstorm is for her alone, Leanne laughs in the face of "Him", wondering if that is all he has got against her. Julian finds her and attempts to have her come with him to see something, which Leanne finds suspicious. Julian then grabs Leanne and calls out for Sean who manages to knock her out. They have Leanne bound and gagged in Dorothy's wheelchair and present her to George and two other members of the Church of Lesser Saints. Confident that they have finally rid themselves of Leanne once and for all, Sean and Julian leave her at the mercy of her former cult members. With the red-hot dagger ready, George tries to persuade Leanne to set the Turners free by ending her own existence. However, Leanne turns the tables on her uncle by running him through with the fiery dagger and leaves George and the others to burn in hell by completing the ritual herself. In the kitchen, Sean and Julian are terrified to see a bloody, but unscathed, Leanne. Sean defends himself with a knife and Julian apologizes for what they had just done. A strong gust of wind breaks the glass door, causing a fearful Sean to accidentally stab himself in the chest. Incensed, Leanne pushes Julian down the basement stairs and the wine shelf falls upon him, pushing Julian further down the ever-expanding wet sinkhole. Leanne calls two ambulances to pick them up. As they lie on stretchers, Leanne tells Sean that she will never let him back in the house again. Having heard the commotion, Dorothy asks Leanne what it was she had just done, which Leanne assures her was just an accident. Now that it is just Leanne in the house, Dorothy is unsure what to do next.
39	9	"Awake"	M. Night Shyamalan	Ishana Night Shyamalan	March 10, 2023
After Leanne calls Sean at the hospital and threatens his life, Sean and Julian try to arrange a meeting outside the house with Dorothy, in the very backseat where Jericho died, who is alone with Leanne. Dorothy is able to sneak out and meet them in their car, where they attempt to remind her about her actions that unintentionally led to Jericho's premature death. Dorothy initially does not understand, but after Julian plays her a voicemail and Sean talks about the reborn doll, she recalls being in a catatonic state following Jericho's death. Horrified and anguished, she lashes out at them but they get her back inside the house, still frozen in shock. Inside, they have a confrontation with Leanne, telling her to leave the house immediately. Leanne calmly tells Dorothy that she alone could return Jericho to life with her extraordinary supernatural abilities for her, and offers Dorothy both a new life with just her and Jericho.
40	10	"Fallen"	Veronika Franz and Severin Fiala	Laura Marks	March 17, 2023
Dorothy wants to be alone, but Sean and Julian object, as they know what Leanne is capable of, still under the belief that Leanne has just hidden away the infant boy of another grieving family two states away, to which Dorothy assures them that there is no infant in the house. She tells them to go back to the car and wait for her. A desperate Leanne continues to plead with Dorothy to accept her, but Dorothy merely ignores her as she goes to mourn in Jericho's room. Furious and heartbroken, Leanne goes to the roof and screams at God for refusing to let her have what she has ever wanted: Dorothy to love her as a real mother would. As the rainstorm worsens, Sean's stitches reopen and Julian is ready to drive him back to the hospital. Dorothy finds a distraught Leanne and tries to get her to come back inside. She assures Leanne that she is not evil, as she had given her months with Jericho when she would have done anything to have her son if only for just one moment and that was more than enough as she had to live with the pain of losing him as part of her deep love for him. Leanne, however, contradicts her, saying how as a girl, she had hid in her room with the fear that she would be punished for the fire that had killed her parents thirteen years ago. As more lightning strikes, Leanne saves Dorothy, and they return to the house. Leanne assures Dorothy that Jericho forgives her for, which leaves Dorothy in relief. Dorothy then gets in the car as Sean has to be taken to the hospital again due to his stitches coming loose. Inside the house, Leanne had started a fire by dousing the rooms in gasoline and throws down a lit match and calmly watches the reborn doll burn to ash. Putting on a Vivian Dale song, she calls Tobe who again asks her out. Leanne says that she would really like that and assures him that it will not rain tomorrow. Having a final conversation with the mannequin she sees as her late mother Laura, Leanne assures it that she has a new mother now and that she no longer needs anything from her, though she does wonder what it feels like when one burns to death. As everything is engulfed in flames, Leanne undergoes the ritual by blinding herself with perfume and slitting her arms with the dagger she had taken from George's corpse. Not wanting to wait any longer, Julian is shocked to find the entire house afire and notices Leanne's shoes outside as she jumps into the flames. The next day, true to Leanne's last words, it is sunny and warm out. The police question Sean as to why the other homes were unaffected, to which Sean replies that they may not come back, having found a hotel to stay in. Dorothy is approached by Officer Reyes whom she thanks for her kindness in being there when Jericho had died. In an unexpected twist, Officer Reyes reveals that, as a seventeen-year-old teenager who had crashed her parents car and ended their lives, she was saved by the Church of Lesser Saints to do real good in her new life, such as keeping an eye on her "chosen sister" Leanne. With Leanne gone, the Turners are ready to start over peacefully. As Sean and Dorothy leave in a taxi for the hotel, Julian is approached by Officer Reyes who reminds him of how his heart had stopped last Christmas from his overdose but was revived by Leanne, which he denies. Officer Reyes, however, assures him that when one is given a second chance, he or she is given a greater purpose. She leaves Julian feeling skeptical as he sees angel wings around his shoulders reflected on a shop window, from a mural behind him, thinking about Reyes's claim.

== Production ==
=== Development ===
Promotional poster

On February 27, 2018, it was announced that Apple Inc. had given the production a series order for a first season consisting of ten episodes. The series was created by Tony Basgallop who also wrote for the series and executive produced it alongside M. Night Shyamalan, Ashwin Rajan, Jason Blumenthal, Todd Black, and Steve Tisch. Production companies involved with the show include Blinding Edge Pictures, Escape Artists, and Dolphin Black Productions. Mike Gioulakis served as the series' cinematographer. On October 3, 2019, it was reported that the series was scheduled to be released on November 28, 2019. Ahead of the series premiere, on November 22, 2019, it was announced that Apple had renewed the series for a second season, which premiered on January 15, 2021. On December 15, 2020, ahead of the second-season premiere, Apple renewed the series for a third season. On December 14, 2021, ahead of the third-season premiere, Apple renewed the series for a fourth and final season.

Shyamalan stated that he originally envisioned the series to stretch for 60 half-hour episodes, or six seasons, but he ultimately planned the show to be four seasons with 40 episodes in total.

=== Casting ===
On August 22, 2018, it was announced that Lauren Ambrose and Nell Tiger Free had been cast in leading roles. On November 30, 2018, it was reported that Rupert Grint had joined the main cast. On December 4, 2018, it was announced that Toby Kebbell had been cast in a starring role. In December 2021, Sunita Mani was announced to be joining the cast.

=== Filming ===
The first season of Servant was filmed in Philadelphia from November 2018 to March 2019. Exterior scenes took place in Philadelphia's Center City near Spruce and 21st Streets. A set for the interior of the Turner home was built in a former paint factory in Bethel Township, Delaware County, Pennsylvania. Italian chef Marc Vetri served as a food consultant for the cooking scenes in season one.

In March 2020, Apple TV+ shut down production of season two due to the COVID-19 pandemic. In September 2020, production resumed to finish the four remaining episodes of season two. Philadelphia chef Drew DiTomo was the food consultant for season two, spending many days making pizzas and teaching the cast to make the pizzas that served as the basis for Cheezus Crust, the fictional pizza delivery company that Sean and Dorothy created during the season.

In February 2021, it was reported that production on season three had begun.

In an interview with Backstage, Grint revealed that unlike many film and television productions, Servant is filmed chronologically, with the cast getting scripts as they film each episode, keeping them just as much a part of the mystery as the characters and viewers.

Apple reportedly asked Shyamalan not to display crucifixes on the walls during filming.

=== Music ===
Composer Trevor Gureckis scored all four season of Servant. He met M. Night Shyamalan in 2019 just after having finished scoring Warner Brother's The Goldfinch (film). The process of finding the sound for Servant involved sifting through ideas one by one as Shyamalan was editing the first episodes, eventually settling on bowed glockenspiel and various "found" percussion as the early sound for Season 1 to achieving a "liturgical" sound. As the series progressed the sonic world was constantly reinvented at Shyamlan's urging to follow the intensity of the progressing story. All four seasons were released digitally with Lakeshore Records with Season 1 also being released on vinyl.

== Release ==
The first season of Servant premiered on Apple TV+ on November 28, 2019, and ran for ten episodes until January 17, 2020. Ahead of the first-season premiere, Apple renewed the show for a second ten-episode season, which premiered on January 15, 2021. In December 2020, ahead of the second-season premiere, the series was renewed for a third season. The third season premiered on January 21, 2022. In December 2021, ahead of the third-season premiere, the series was renewed for a fourth and final season. The fourth and final season premiered on January 13, 2023.

=== Marketing ===
Shyamalan doing a reddit AMA to promote Servant in 2021

Coinciding with the release of the second-season finale, and paying homage to Cheezus Crust—the fictional pizza business that Dorothy and Sean create in the season—Apple partnered with two pizza restaurants in Los Angeles to offer free pizza throughout the weekend.

== Reception ==
=== Critical response ===
Critical response of Servant
Season	Rotten Tomatoes	Metacritic
1	84% (61 reviews)	64 (20 reviews)
2	88% (26 reviews)	76 (9 reviews)
3	92% (12 reviews)	73 (4 reviews)
4	100% (19 reviews)	82 (7 reviews)

For the first season, the review-aggregation website Rotten Tomatoes reported an 84% approval rating with an average score of 7.2/10, based on 61 reviews. The website's critical consensus reads, "Though Servant's slithering mystery often wanders into dark, crowded corners, its claustrophobic atmosphere and powerful performances build enough tension to keep viewers hooked." Metacritic, which uses a weighted average, assigned a score of 64 out of 100 for the season, based on reviews from 20 critics, indicating "generally favorable reviews".

For the second season, Rotten Tomatoes reported an 88% approval rating with an average score of 7.6/10, based on 26 reviews. The site's critical consensus reads, "Servant's second season serves up a solid—if not always convincing—set of thrills with a better grasp on its dark humor." Metacritic assigned a score of 76 out of 100 based on nine critics, indicating "generally favorable reviews".

For the third season, Rotten Tomatoes reported a 92% approval rating with an average score of 6.7/10, based on 12 reviews. Metacritic assigned a score of 73 out of 100 based on four critics, indicating "generally favorable reviews".

For the fourth and final season, Rotten Tomatoes reported a 100% approval rating with an average score of 7.9/10, based on 19 reviews. The site's critical consensus reads, "Servant's devotion to gothic absurdity pays off handsomely in a confident final season, with this singular series ending on a note of characteristically wry disquiet." Metacritic assigned a score of 82 out of 100 based on seven critics, indicating "universal acclaim".

Author Stephen King has praised the series on multiple occasions, calling it "spooky as hell", "extremely creepy and totally involving." Filmmaker Guillermo del Toro has called it a beautifully crafted, elegant show which feels like a European slow burn. He particularly praised the surgical staging and camera work in the M. Night Shyamalan-directed episodes, as well as Rupert Grint's performance.

=== Accolades ===
Award	Date of ceremony	Category	Recipient(s)	Result	Ref.
Golden Reel Awards	January 19, 2020	Outstanding Achievement in Sound Editing – Sound Effects, Foley, Music, Dialogue and ADR for Live Action Broadcast Media Under 35 Minutes	Sean Garnhart, Alexa Zimmerman, Mark Filip, Fred Rosenberg, Lesley Langs, Julien Pirrie, and Gareth Rhys Jones (for "Reborn")	Nominated	
Golden Reel Awards	April 16, 2021	Outstanding Achievement in Sound Editing – Sound Effects, Foley, Music, Dialogue and ADR for Live Action Broadcast Media Under 35 Minutes	Sean Garnhart, Mark Filip, Michael Feuser, Lesley Langs, Julien Pirrie, and Gareth Rhys Jones (for "2:00")	Won	
SEC Awards	June 21, 2021	Best Supernatural Mystery/Thriller Series	Servant	Nominated	
SEC Awards	June 21, 2021	Best Actor in a Thriller Series	Rupert Grint	Nominated	
SEC Awards	June 21, 2021	Best Actress in a Thriller Series	Lauren Ambrose	Nominated	
Hollywood Critics Association	August 29, 2021	Best Streaming Series, Drama	Servant	Nominated	
Hollywood Critics Association	August 29, 2021	Best Supporting Actor in a Streaming Series, Drama	Rupert Grint	Won	
Saturn Awards	October 26, 2021	Best Horror Television Series	Servant	Nominated	
Primetime Creative Arts Emmy Awards	September 18, 2021	Outstanding Cinematography for a Single-Camera Series (Half-Hour)	Marshall Adams (for "2:00")	Nominated	
Critics' Choice Super Awards	March 17, 2022	Best Horror Series	Servant	Nominated	
Critics' Choice Super Awards	March 17, 2022	Best Actor in a Horror Series	Rupert Grint	Nominated	
Critics' Choice Super Awards	March 17, 2022	Best Actress in a Horror Series	Lauren Ambrose	Nominated	
Hollywood Critics Association	August 14, 2022	Best Directing in a Streaming Series, Drama	M. Night Shyamalan (for "Donkey")	Nominated	
Saturn Awards	October 25, 2022	Best Horror / Thriller Series (Streaming)	Servant	Nominated	
Saturn Awards	October 25, 2022	Best Supporting Actress in a Streaming Series	Nell Tiger Free	Nominated	

== Lawsuit ==
In January 2020, Francesca Gregorini filed a lawsuit against the show's producers including Tony Basgallop and M. Night Shyamalan, the production companies involved, and Apple TV+, alleging copyright infringement for her 2013 drama film The Truth About Emanuel. The Truth About Emanuel is a psychological thriller in which a woman uses a lifelike doll to cope with the loss of her infant, hiring a young girl as a nanny to take care of it. Basgallop and Shyamalan responded that neither had seen her film and that any similarity was a coincidence. They go further in saying that Servant was in development before the creation of Gregorini's film.

On May 28, 2020, a federal judge threw out the copyright lawsuit against Shyamalan and Apple, ruling that the TV show is not similar enough to the film to merit a lawsuit. Gregorini responded that the "ruling is disappointing, but not surprising", and that "the balance of power in the entertainment industry has always favored powerful men and institutions" after the suit was thrown out. On July 21, 2020, the court ordered Gregorini to pay the defendants' attorneys' fees of $162,467. The court emphasized the objective unreasonableness of her claims.

In February 2022, however, the United States Court of Appeals for the Ninth Circuit determined that the lawsuit was dismissed prematurely, as the discovery steps had not actually been carried out, ruling "'reasonable minds could differ' on whether the stories are substantially similar."

On January 27, 2025, it was revealed a jury found in favor of the defendants, finding the defendants did not have access to The Truth About Emanuel before the first episodes of Servant were created.
