= Logan George =

American film director, writer, and editor

- Born: 1990 (age 35–36)
- Education: New York University (BFA)
- Occupations: Director, writer, editor

Logan George (born 1990) is an American film director, writer, and editor. George works exclusively with his partner, Celine Held, as a co-writer and co-director. His debut feature film Topside premiered at the 77th Venice International Film Festival. His short film work has been nominated for the Short Film Palme d'Or at the 2018 Cannes Film Festival, and has premiered at Sundance Film Festival and Telluride Film Festival.

== Education ==
George attended New York University and received a Bachelor of Fine Arts.

== Career ==
George and Held were among the "25 New Faces of Independent Film" in Filmmaker Magazine's 2017 annual list after the success of their short film Mouse, which premiered at SXSW that same year. His subsequent short films Lockdown and Caroline premiered at Sundance Film Festival and Cannes Film Festival, respectively. Caroline was nominated for the Short Film Palme d'Or, and was short-listed for the 91st Academy Awards.

George's debut feature film Topside premiered at the 77th Venice International Film Festival. George co-wrote, co-directed, and edited the film. Topside won awards at Venice and SXSW film festivals, and has been praised by critics. Sheri Linden of The Hollywood Reporter said the film is "a striking debut, cinematic and affecting," and called George and Held's direction "sensitive ... and crucial". Eric Kohn of Indiewire called the debut film "riveting," saying, "Logan George and Celine Held's debut is a taut mother-daughter survivor story with a breakthrough performance [at] its center."

George again collaborated with Held to co-direct the 2024 thriller film Caddo Lake, released as an Max exclusive. The film, originally titled Vanishings and later The Vanishings at Caddo Lake before being renamed for a final time before release, was filmed in 2021. The film stars Dylan O'Brien and Eliza Scanlen, Caddo Lake was produced by M. Night Shyamalan under his Blinding Edge Pictures banner.
