= Blinding Edge Pictures =

American thriller film production company

- Logo used since 2015
- Type: Private
- Industry: Film; Television
- Founded: August 2, 1998; 28 years ago
- Founder: M. Night Shyamalan
- Headquarters: Berwyn, Pennsylvania, United States
- Key people: M. Night Shyamalan; Ashwin Rajan
- Divisions: The Night Chronicles

Blinding Edge Pictures is an American film and television production company, founded on August 2, 1998 by M. Night Shyamalan. The company is known for producing films, such as the Unbreakable series, Signs, The Village, The Happening, After Earth, The Visit, Old and Knock at the Cabin.

== Overview ==
On August 2, 1998, M. Night Shyamalan founded Blinding Edge Pictures. In 1999, the company signed a lucarative deal with Disney to develop its properties from his own scripts after the success of The Sixth Sense. The deal was extended in 2001, after submitting Signs to the studio. The first films produced by the company include Unbreakable, Signs, and The Village. The relationship between Disney and Shyamalan soured after the reception of The Village, leading him to move to Warner Bros. Pictures in 2006 for Lady in the Water.

In July 2008, The Night Chronicles was formed as a division for Blinding Edge Pictures and Media Rights Capital. The plan for this division was to create a trilogy of films with Shyamalan writing and producing the stories and picking the filmmakers while Media Rights Capital would finance the films. The first installment in The Night Chronicles trilogy was the 2010 horror film Devil helmed by John Erick Dowdle, the film revolves on five people trapped in an elevator where one of them is the Devil. In June 2010, Reincarnate (formerly Twelve Strangers) was announced to be the second installment in the trilogy which would be helmed by Daniel Stamm, the film revolves on a jury that's haunted by supernatural forces while deliberating on a murder case. In September 2010, the third installment in the trilogy would be a sequel to Shyamalan's film Unbreakable, the film would've focused on a villain origin story.

In 2015, the company released its first television series Wayward Pines created by Chad Hodge and executive produced by Shyamalan and released by Fox.

In January 2016, it was announced that Shyamalan would executive produce a reboot of Tales from the Crypt as part of TNT's new two-hour horror block. The network ordered a 10-episode season that was slated for Fall 2017. The series was to keep the episodic anthology format based on the Tales from the Crypt comics by EC Comics rather than the 1989 series, with the Cryptkeeper not being featured in the reboot. In June 2017, it was announced that TNT would not move forward with the series due to legal rights.

In 2019, the company released its second television series Servant, created by Tony Basgallop and executive produced by Shyamalan and released by Apple TV+.

In February 2023, Shyamalan signed a multi-year first-look directing and producing deal with Warner Bros. Pictures, thus ending his deal with Universal Pictures. The deal would have Shyamalan and his company develop original projects for the filmmaker to produce and/or direct for WBPG production divisions Warner Bros. Pictures and New Line Cinema. The first two films from the deal included The Watchers, written and directed by Shyamalan's daughter Ishana Night Shyamalan and Trap, written and directed by Shyamalan, both released in 2024.

== Filmography ==
Release date	Film	Director(s)	Budget	Gross	Distributor(s)
November 22, 2000	Unbreakable	M. Night Shyamalan	$75 million	$248.1 million	Buena Vista Pictures
August 2, 2002	Signs	M. Night Shyamalan	$72 million	$408.2 million	Buena Vista Pictures
July 30, 2004	The Village	M. Night Shyamalan	$60 million	$256.7 million	Buena Vista Pictures
July 21, 2006	Lady in the Water	M. Night Shyamalan	$70 million	$72.8 million	Warner Bros. Pictures
June 13, 2008	The Happening	M. Night Shyamalan	$48 million	$163.4 million	20th Century Fox
July 1, 2010	The Last Airbender	M. Night Shyamalan	$150 million	$319.7 million	Paramount Pictures
September 17, 2010	Devil	John Erick Dowdle	$10 million	$62.7 million	Universal Pictures
May 31, 2013	After Earth	M. Night Shyamalan	$130 million	$243.6 million	Sony Pictures Releasing
September 11, 2015	The Visit	M. Night Shyamalan	$5 million	$98.5 million	Universal Pictures
January 20, 2017	Split	M. Night Shyamalan	$9 million	$278.5 million	Universal Pictures
January 18, 2019	Glass	M. Night Shyamalan	$20 million	$247 million	Universal Pictures
July 23, 2021	Old	M. Night Shyamalan	$18 million	$90.1 million	Universal Pictures
February 3, 2023	Knock at the Cabin	M. Night Shyamalan	$20 million	$54.8 million	Universal Pictures
June 7, 2024	The Watchers	Ishana Night Shyamalan	$30 million	$30.5 million	Warner Bros. Pictures
August 2, 2024	Trap	M. Night Shyamalan	$30 million	$82.7 million	Warner Bros. Pictures
October 10, 2024	Caddo Lake	Celine Held; Logan George	—N/a	—N/a	Warner Bros. Pictures
February 5, 2027	Remain	M. Night Shyamalan	—N/a	—N/a	Warner Bros. Pictures

== Television series ==
Year	Series	Creator(s)	Network
2015–16	Wayward Pines	Chad Hodge	Fox
2019–23	Servant	Tony Basgallop	Apple TV+
