= Sandcastle (comics) =

2010 comic by Pierre Oscar Levy and Frederik Peeters

Sandcastle (French: Château de sable) is a 2011 French-language graphic novel published by Atrabile, written by Pierre Oscar Lévy from France and drawn by Frederik Peeters from Switzerland. Nora Mahony translated the work into English, with that version released in 2013. SelfMadeHero published the English version.

It is the inspiration for the 2021 American film Old, written, produced and directed by M. Night Shyamalan, which has some differences in the character composition.

== Plot ==
Amesan, a Kabyle jeweler, arrives at a secluded French cove and witnesses a young woman skinny dipping. A family – parents Robert and Marianne, children Felix and Zoe and pet dog Elvis – settle on the beach and find the woman's abandoned clothes. Another family appears, consisting of parents Charles and Nathalie, children Louis and Sophie and Nathalie's mother. Sophie wanders off and converses with Amesan, who warns of a strange quality to the beach. Louis and his grandmother discover the drowned body of the woman, and Charles accuses Amesan of murdering her. After he calls the police, others arrive: science fiction writer Henry Lascaride and couple Oliver and Florence. Nathalie's mother dies in an ominous fashion and the families' children seem to have aged a few years within moments. All subsequent attempts to phone for outside help are met with an "invalid number" message, and Amesan claims that an unknown power has prevented him from leaving the beach.

Driven by the sudden onset of puberty, Louis and Zoe go to the cove and have sex. Meanwhile, the others determine that the beach is aging them at a rate of a year every half-hour, and that some force induces unconsciousness in those who attempt to escape; Henry speculates that the young woman drowned after losing consciousness at this barrier. After Henry proposes some theories about the cause of their situation, Elvis dies and the three bodies are buried. Louis and Zoe return with the latter undergoing swift pregnancy, giving birth to a girl. As the group throws a final picnic, they suddenly hear gunshots being fired at José – the son of the local hotelier – who is running in their direction. Because the group cannot leave the beach, they can only watch as he is shot dead.

Night falls and the group weaken with age. After Henry dies, Amesan tells the group a story about a king who is visited by a messenger of death, who has come to take the king's soul. When the king begs for an extension of seven years, the messenger grants his request on the condition that he will reappear to the king anywhere within the next seven years without prior notice. The fearful king builds a large fortress in which he secludes himself. When the messenger appears in the seventh year, the king does not understand how he got in but realizes that he has been living in his tomb for seven years. At the end of Amesan's story, Oliver and Florence walk into the sea to drown. By morning, all but Louis and Zoe's now middle-aged daughter are dead, leaving her to build a sandcastle alone as she waits for her inevitable demise.

== Reception ==
Daniel Kurland of Comic Book Resources wrote that in 2021 the comic was "gaining a larger appreciation" and that until the release of Old, the comic had "flown under the radar for a lot of people".

Morning Star wrote that the work is "beautifully drawn".

Comic Book Resources stated that the work "feels like you should be seeing it in 35 MM at the Cannes Film Festival."
