= Celine Held =

American and British film director, writer, and actress

- Born: 1990; Pittsburgh, Pennsylvania, U.S.
- Education: New York University (BFA)
- Occupations: Director, writer, actress
- Website: Official website

Celine Held is an American and British film director, writer, and actress. Her debut feature film Topside, co-directed with her partner Logan George, premiered at the 77th Venice International Film Festival. Her short film Caroline that she co-wrote, co-directed and starred in, was nominated for the Short Film Palme d'Or at the 2018 Cannes Film Festival. Her additional short film work has premiered at Sundance Film Festival and at South by Southwest.

== Career ==
=== Short films ===
Held and George's first short film, Mouse, premiered at South by Southwest in 2017. Held was then named among the "25 New Faces of Independent Film" in Filmmaker Magazine's annual list with her partner Logan George in 2017. Their second short film Lockdown premiered at Sundance Film Festival.

Held and George's short film Caroline was nominated for the Short Film Palme d'Or at the 2018 Cannes Film Festival and South by Southwest. Caroline was also short-listed for the Academy Award for Best Live Action Short Film at the 91st Academy Awards. Held also played the mother of the titular character in Caroline, a role that she reprised for Held and George's feature film debut Topside.

=== Feature films ===
Held and George's first feature film Topside premiered at 77th Venice International Film Festival. Topside won the Mario Serandrei Award for Best Technical Achievement at Venice, and the jury award for Best Director at South by Southwest. Topside has been praised by critics, landing on The Hollywood Reporter's list of the 20 Best Films From the Toronto and Venice Festivals. Sheri Linden of The Hollywood Reporter said the film is "a striking debut, cinematic and affecting." Eric Kohn of Indiewire called the debut film "riveting," saying, "Logan George and Celine Held's debut is a taut mother-daughter survivor story with a breakthrough performance [at] its center."

Held has also been praised for her pivotal role in Topside, with critics calling her performance "harrowing," "unnerving," and "gutwrenching."

Held & George's research for their feature film debut Topside has been extensive. The pair created a documentary on homelessness 50 Moments, which premiered at South by Southwest. Held & George spent time in the tunnels before filming on Topside, and credit the inspiration for the film to books The Mole People: Life in the Tunnels Beneath New York City by Jennifer Toth and The Tunnel: the Underground Homeless of New York City by Margaret Morton.

Held again collaborated with George to co-direct the 2024 thriller film Caddo Lake, released as a Max exclusive. The film, originally titled Vanishings and later The Vanishings at Caddo Lake before being renamed for a final time before release, was filmed in 2021. The film stars Dylan O'Brien and Eliza Scanlen, Caddo Lake was produced by M. Night Shyamalan under his Blinding Edge Pictures banner.

== Personal life ==
Held is a US and UK citizen.
