= Reborn doll =

Hyper-realistic doll

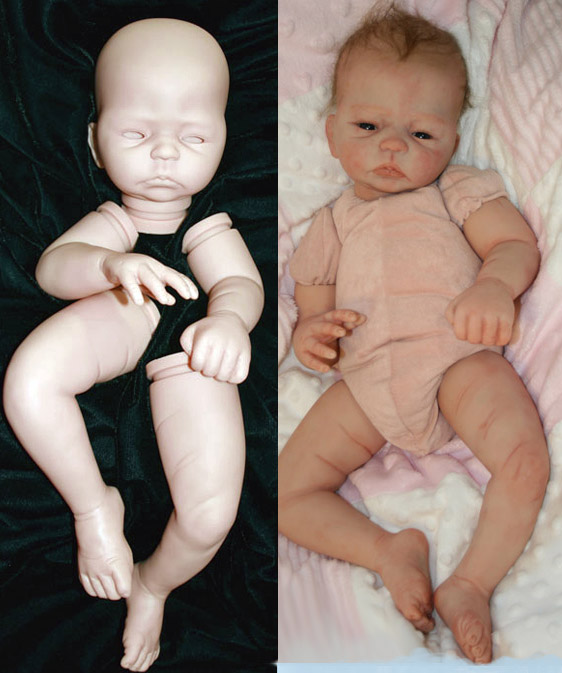
Vinyl doll kit shown side by side (unpainted parts & painted "reborn" doll on cloth body)

A reborn doll is a hand made art doll that resembles a human infant with as much realism as possible. The process of creating a reborn doll is referred to as reborning and the doll artists are referred to as reborners. Reborn dolls may be created from a blank kit or from a manufactured doll and are also known as lifelike dolls or reborn baby dolls.

The hobby of creating reborn baby dolls began in the early 1990s when doll enthusiasts wanted more realistic dolls. Since then, an industry and community surrounding reborn dolls has emerged. Reborn dolls are primarily purchased online but can be available at fairs. Depending on craftsmanship, they range in price from hundreds to tens of thousands of dollars.

Reborning involves numerous time-consuming steps. The most basic form of the process involves taking a vinyl doll, adding multiple hand painted layers of paint, and adding other physical features to the doll. Artists can pick different brands to best suit the doll they wish to create. Consumers can also buy reborn doll kits that include the doll parts and supplies for creating their own reborn. Making a doll from a kit is called newborning and allows artists to omit some steps in the fabrication process. Many supplies are needed for both external and internal modifications of reborns to make the doll seem more realistic.

Some consumers of reborn dolls use them to cope with their grief over a lost child (a memory reborn), or as a portrait doll of a grown child. Others collect reborns as they would regular dolls. These dolls are sometimes played with as if they are an infant. Critics debate the impact of reborn dolls—some see them as harmful, while others believe they aid grieving, though cultural taboos make the practice controversial. Because of their realistic appearance, reborn dolls have occasionally been mistaken for real babies and "rescued" from parked cars after being reported to the police by passers-by.

== History ==
The art of making reborn dolls began in the United States in the 1990s. Reborning follows a long tradition of collectors, artists, and manufacturers restoring and enhancing dolls in order to portray more realism. The internet has allowed doll artists and collectors to create an online society focused on reborn dolls. In 2002, the first reborn was offered on eBay. This has expanded the reborn market allowing artists to open online stores which function figuratively as nurseries. The niche market for the dolls began with doll collectors who admired the superior lifelike accuracy of the doll. The market quickly reached those who wanted to use the doll as an emotional outlet, either to mother or for therapeutic purposes. Mass media coverage has helped to develop the phenomenon in other countries. Reborning enjoys popularity in United States, Canada and Brazil. Doll manufacturers have also taken advantage of the trend and sell supplies, tools, and accessories catering to reborn followers. This has allowed reborners to invent new techniques causing the dolls to become increasingly realistic over time. Magazines, books, organizations, and conventions dedicated to reborn dolls have been started as a result of this popularity.

== Fabrication ==
Reborns are either silicone or vinyl dolls, created by reborn artists. The appearance of the doll depends on the creator; however, certain reborn artists allow customers to customize their doll, usually using a photograph to replicate a particular infant.

=== Reborning ===
Any type of vinyl doll can be used for reborning. Dolls vary by size, shape, and materials, making some more desirable or popular than others. According to Doll Reader Magazine, Berenguer Babies, Zapf, Lee Middleton, Apple Valley, and Secrist Dolls are doll companies that make dolls which are easy to transform into reborns. Kathryn Peck of Doll Reader Magazine explains that with JC Toys Berenguer Babies, it is because the dolls already resemble human babies in their expressions, body shapes, surface materials, and other lifelike attributes.

=== Kits ===
A reborn can be created from a blank kit as opposed to reborning a whole manufactured doll. Manufacturers have reacted to the growing trend of artists transforming dolls by hiring reborn artists to become doll sculptors and design doll molds and kits.

When reborning from a kit, the first several steps of the process are completed by reborn sculpt artists and doll manufacturers. The kit comes as a disassembled blank baby doll ready to be reborned, and select supplies. Other supplies not provided in the kit can be purchased separately.

=== Supplies ===
Starter kits are equipped with basic reborning necessities such as limbs, faces, heads, paint brushes, eyelashes, acrylic/glass eyes, weighting pellets, "heat set" or air dry paints, cloth bodies, cable ties, nose drill bits, fake tears, thinning shears, cosmetic foam wedges, cotton dipped applicators, and glue. These supplies may be purchased separately from a variety of retailers. The nose drill bits are used for creating and perfecting the nostrils of the doll. Acetone or a paint thinner medium is needed for removing the factory paint from the doll. Hair is an optional choice to add to a doll. Fine mohair, human hair, or wigs are usually used, but it is found in a variety of types. Rooting tools are utilized for this process and are available in numerous sizes 20, 36, 38, 40, and 42. The smaller the number the thicker the needle which will grab more hair and leave a bigger hole in the head of the doll. Eyes for a reborn doll are offered in a variety of brands and sizes.

=== Process ===
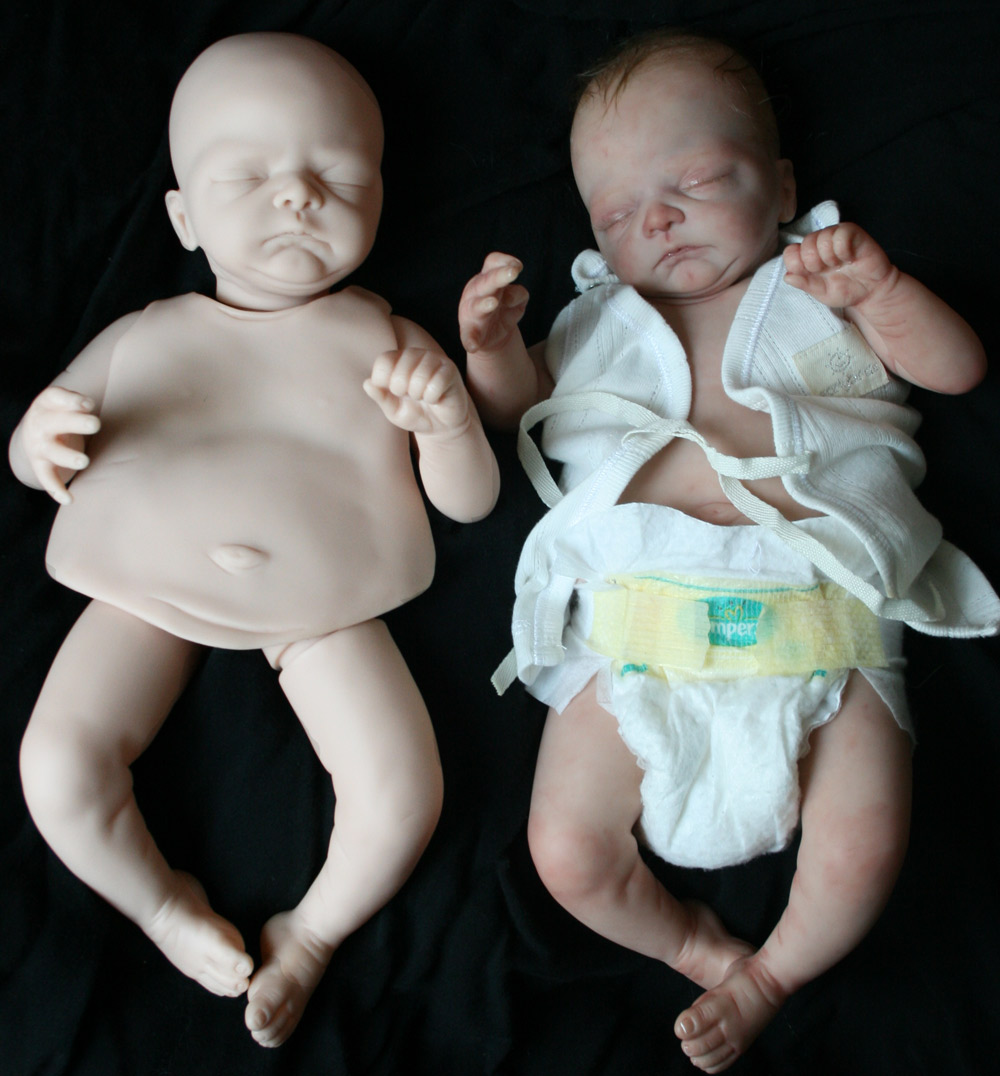
Vinyl doll kit shown side by side (unpainted parts & painted "reborn" doll). The doll has a "chest/belly plate".

The technique of reborning a play doll typically involves a number of steps. To begin, the doll is taken apart and factory paint is removed. Then a blue color wash may be applied to give the appearance of realistic baby skin undertones. For dolls with an awake appearance eyes must be replaced. The outer layer of the vinyl doll is given its skin tone by adding dozens of layers of different paint tones to build up and achieve a realistic human skin effect. If heat set paints are used, the doll parts must be heat set by baking them inside an oven or by using a heatgun after each layer of paint is applied. Lighter skin tone dolls can take 15 to 30 layers. The effects of the blue color wash combined with the outside layers of paint creates the appearance of veins, and layers of paint done with special sponges give the doll its newborn mottled look. Manicured nails and opening of the nose holes are other details that are added during this process.

There are air dry paints now available to reborn artists, sold under several brand names. Many feel that repeated baking of vinyl can cause it to break down over time. In addition, there are fumes and chemicals released during the heating process.

The next step is to apply hair. The hair can be done in one of three ways: painting, wigging, or rooting. When rooting, the hair is added by hand with a rooting needle, micro-rooting is usually 1–4 hair strands per plug. When each hair is added individually strand by strand with only one hair per plug this is called mono-rooting. This can take up to 30 or more hours per head. Once the hair is finished, the original vinyl body is weighted with a soft stuffed body filled with pellets/fine glass beads/fiberfill.The weight corresponds with its age to achieve a realistic effect. Various additions also can be added to give the doll an even more lifelike appearance. Reborns heads are often weighted, so that owners have to support the head like one would a real newborn. Purchasers can have magnets attached inside the mouth or head for attaching a pacifier or hair bows. Electronic devices that mimic a heartbeat or make the chest rise and fall to simulate breathing are common. Reborns can come with an umbilical cord, baby fat, heat packs to make the reborn warm to the touch, or voice boxes that mimic infant sounds. For preemie dolls, they may come in incubators with a breathing apparatus attached to their nose.

== Collecting ==
Institutions have developed to aid reborn hobbyists with collecting by providing information, products, and social networking. These institutions include magazines, and associations and organizations which sponsor conferences and conventions. Collectors and artists have described their reasons for purchasing and/or creating reborn dolls as varying from a love of dolls to a passion for art.

=== Purchasing ===
Reborn dolls are handmade art made by artists and can not be factory produced. They are usually found online and can be purchased through the artists' online stores (often termed nurseries), through artists' personal or doll/nursery pages on Facebook where you can see all their previous work for assurity or through many Facebook groups and pages and at numerous doll conventions/fairs. Incomplete crafting "kits" to create original reborns can also be purchased from various online stores. There is a large price range depending on the quality of the doll, the sculpt used and the experience of the artist; they can sell anywhere from hundreds to thousands of dollars.

There are many factors to look for when purchasing a reborn. If the complexion is too dark this is called a blue baby, and indicates it was dyed excessively or uses colored sand for weight that could have seeped into the vinyl. The type of material used to weight the reborn should be considered because some materials do not react well with vinyl and will cause it to deteriorate. The doll should not be shiny. This indicates the doll was washed with acetone before painting, which prevents the color from correctly sticking to the doll's surface. It may also be caused by the type of paint used to color the doll. This is corrected with a special matte varnish. The parts used are important, as original parts may be replaced. The replacement parts must be appropriately proportioned with the doll and made of quality material. At times having the original body retains the doll's value either because it was made to fit that specific doll, or the artist left a signature mark. Eye brand, size, fitting, and alignment should be closely examined as well. Another feature to observe is the type of paint used for coloring and whether the doll is realistic in its details such as veins and newborn imperfections. The type of hair and technique used in applying the hair may determine the quality. Some artists open the nose, the holes should be correctly shaped, and the nails should be properly manicured.

=== Associations and organizations ===
The International Reborn Doll Artists (IRDA) originated at the first conference for reborn doll artists on January 21, 2005. The IRDA group was assembled in order to offer education for improved skills in the art of reborn doll creation. They offer skill building tutorials and instruction so reborners can remain up to date on the newest techniques and meet others who share a common interest in reborn doll fabrication. A reborn artist can join the organization at any skill level, but members are asked to uphold a list of standards that were created by the IRDA's executive board. This ethical code stipulates the guidelines members are to follow in advertising, listing, and describing their dolls in order to divide credit fairly between manufacturers, sculptors, and artists.

=== Conferences and conventions ===
The First Annual International Reborn Doll Artists Conference was held in Orlando, Florida on January 21–23, 2005 in conjunction with IDEX The Annual Debut of the World's Finest Collectibles. In January 2006 in Las Vegas, Nevada, Doll Reader Magazine sponsored the IDEX Reborn Competition at the First International IDEX Reborn Convention. Doll Reader Magazine started publishing over twenty-five years ago. It is now published nine times a year, keeps collectors informed on trends of modern-day doll collecting, and continues to sponsor the IDEX trade shows that feature reborn competitions and conventions. In the summer of 2008, ABC News followed a reborn convention in Illinois. ABC News was also in St. Louis, Missouri to attend the first annual Tiny Treasures Show held in 2008. The show features exhibitors, collectors, retailers, manufacturers, workshops, and contests for reborners. Reborn dolls can be found at doll fairs as well.

== Social issues and reactions ==
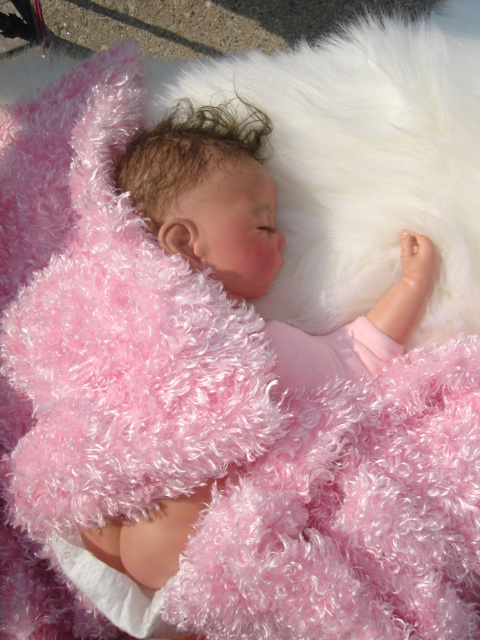
A typical reborn doll. Note the added cloth body on the limbs, and the "rear plate" to make it more realistic.

The overwhelming majority of reborn customers are older women. The process of buying a reborn can be done to simulate an adoption process, rather than a prosaic sale of a product. As part of this, the dolls often come with fake birth certificates or adoption certificates. Many women collect reborns as they would a non-reborn doll, whilst others purchase them to fill a void of a lost child and may treat reborns as living babies. Media features and public receptions have used such adjectives as "creepy" to describe the reborns. This can be explained by the uncanny valley hypothesis. It states that as objects become more lifelike they gain an increasing empathetic response, until a certain point at which the response changes to repulsion. Some department stores such as Harrods have refused to stock the dolls because of this reaction, claiming they are too lifelike.

=== Emotional bond ===
Many reborn owners are simply doll collectors, while others have experienced miscarriage, stillbirth or neonatal death, have no means for adoption, or suffer from empty nest syndrome. They may utilize the dolls as a substitute for a child. Some owners dress the dolls, wash their hair, and may even take them for walks in strollers and take them shopping. Reborn hobbyists refer to the emotional response to holding their dolls as cuddle therapy. Studies suggest cuddling a baby releases hormones which produce a sense of emotional well-being, and some psychologists believe that this may happen with realistic dolls as well. Consultant psychiatrist Raj Persaud explains that mothering a real newborn baby releases the hormone oxytocin in the mother, and hypothesizes that this may explain why "reborn mothers" become emotionally attached to the reborn baby doll.

For grieving parents who form emotional bonds with reborn dolls, some child bereavement counselors advise against parents substituting their deceased child with the dolls. Reborn mothers contend that they are not replacing children but remembering them. Psychiatrist Sue Varma, teacher at the NYU school of medicine, says mothering reborn dolls rather than just collecting them can become a problem when it is used as prop and becomes the person's only form of socializing. Psychiatrist Gail Saltz with NewYork-Presbyterian Hospital supports the use of reborns for people who do not want to make the commitment of having a real child, and also to comfort bereaved parents. She offers that in this case the reborn may symbolize a step in the grieving process. Concern should only come if someone who lost a baby grows too attached to their reborn because it could indicate their grief is not getting resolved. In this case, the likeness of the doll to the deceased child risks being harmful as a permanent replacement for the grieving parents. Ian James, a doctor at the Centre for the Health of the Elderly at Newcastle General Hospital in the U.K., said that holding the dolls helps calm elderly residents, helping them feel peaceful and quiet.

=== Law enforcement incidents ===
There have been instances where reborn babies have been mistaken as real by police, due to their realistic appearance. In July 2008, police in Queensland, Australia, smashed a car window to rescue what seemed like an unconscious baby only to find it was a reborn doll. The police stated that the doll was "incredibly lifelike" and that bystanders who thought a baby was dying were frightened by the incident. A similar incident was reported in the United States, in which police broke the window of a Hummer to save a baby that turned out to be a reborn doll. On June 18, 2019, NYC police confirmed that a dead infant found in a park in Queens was identified, more than an hour later, to actually be a doll.

In 2009, reborners uncovered a blogging hoax in which a woman – described by ABC News as an "anti-abortion blogger" – claimed she was pregnant with a terminally ill child. She opened a P.O. box in order to receive gifts, money, and prayers. The hoax was uncovered when reborners reading the blog realized that the pictures of the baby posted on the blog were actually a reborn doll they recognized through the familiar reborn sculpture.

=== Media appearances ===
Reborn dolls have been featured in a number of movies, series and television shows. A December 10, 2008, episode of Dr. Phil entitled "Obsessions" discussed the topic of reborning. In January 2008, a Channel 4 series, My Fake Baby, explored the lives of women who collect the lifelike baby dolls. Featuring this documentary the British television magazine show on Channel 4, Richard & Judy, held an interview with the reborn artist in the documentary, Jaime Eaton, collector Mary Flint and psychiatrist Raj Persuad. On January 2, 2009, an ABC News article described both the manufacturing and the emotional interaction of reborn dolls, while an episode of 20/20 talked about the mothering process and attachment to reborns. On January 31, 2008, Inside Edition aired a segment showing artist Eve Newsom and her reborn dolls. In July 2014, an episode of Perception, an American fictional series about a neuropsychiatrist who helps solve murders, called "Inconceivable" was all about a real baby and a reborn. In December 2015, Shaylen Maxwell, owner and artist of Reborn, Sweet was featured in The Globe and Mail in a LIFE feature on the therapeutic value of reborn dolls in treating anxiety and grief. In April 2019, a reborn doll is featured in the Netflix-produced horror show Chambers.

A reborn doll also plays a significant part in the 2019 M. Night Shyamalan psychological horror television series Servant. An episode of High Maintenance (season 3, episode 8, "Proxy") features a couple caring for a reborn doll.

== See also ==
- Uncanny valley
