= Frederik Peeters =

Swiss graphic novelist

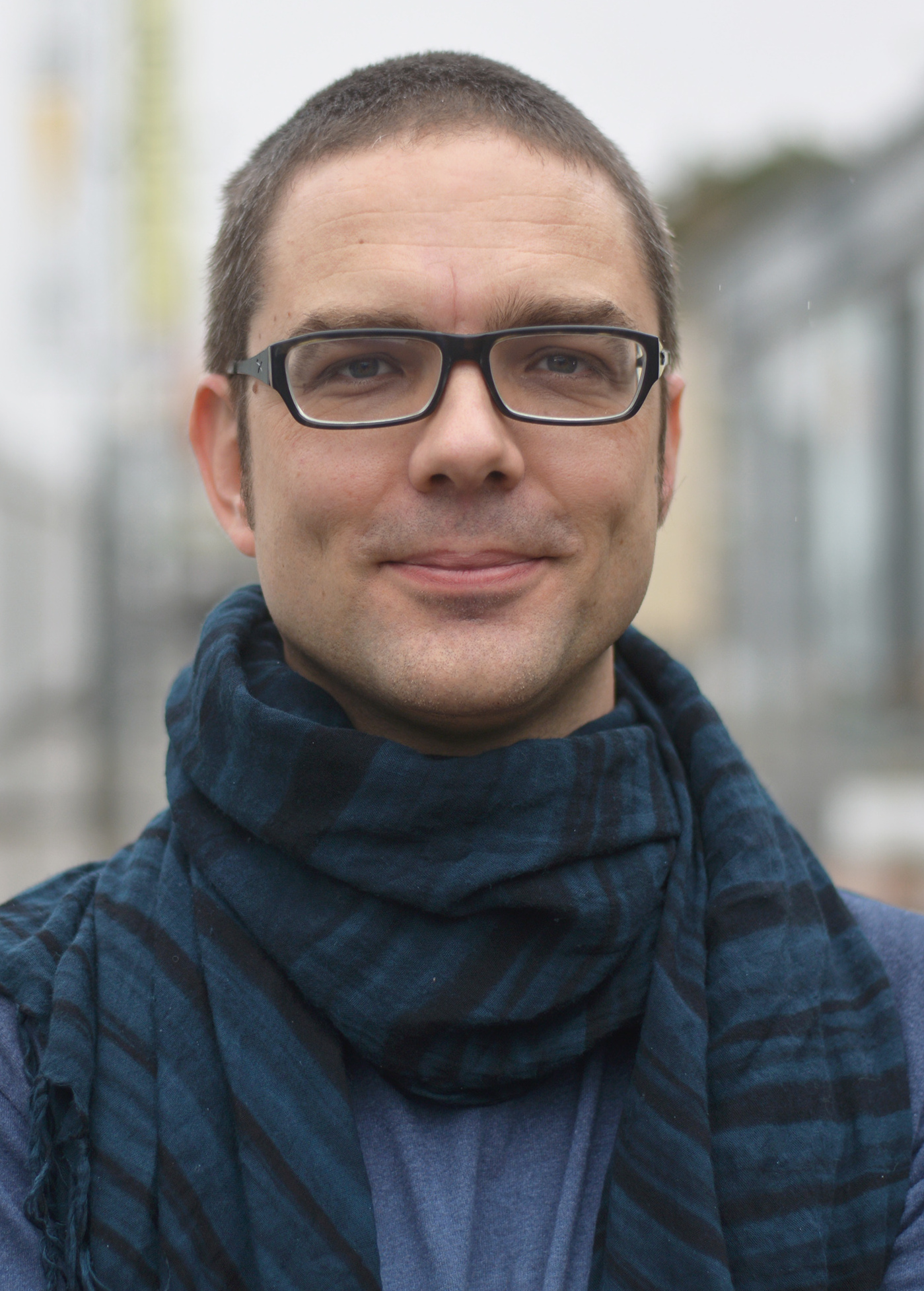
- Peeters in 2016
- Born: 14 August 1974 (age 52) Geneva, Switzerland
- Areas: Artist, writer
- Notable works: Blue Pills; Sandcastle; Aâma
- Awards: Alph'art

Frederik Peeters (French: [pɛtɛʁs]; born 14 August 1974 in Geneva) is a contemporary Swiss graphic novelist.

== Biography ==
Peeters received his bachelor of arts degree in visual communication from the École Supérieure d’Arts Appliqués in Geneva in 1995. Peeters currently lives with his partner Cati, her son, and their daughter in Geneva.

His autobiographical graphic novel Blue Pills received the Polish Jury Prize at the Angoulême International Comics Festival, where it was also nominated for Best Book. Blue Pills also won the Premios La Cárcel de Papel in Spain for Best Foreign Comic. This was his first work to be translated into English.

Other graphic novels include Pachyderme (nominated for the Grand Prix at the Angoulême International Comics Festival 2010), Lupus, RG, and Koma. In 2010 he has collaborated with Pierre Oscar Lévy on a science fiction graphic novel, available in English in 2011 as Sandcastle. The novel was adapted into an M. Night Shyamalan film, Old. In 2014, Blue Pills was adapted into a television film directed by Jean-Philippe Amar and broadcast on Arte.

He is also the author and illustrator of Aâma, a four-volume science-fiction series originally published in French by Gallimard between 2011 and 2014. The English editions were released by SelfMadeHero between 2014 and 2015..

== Selected works ==
=== Graphic novels ===
- Pilules bleues (Atrabile, 2001; published in English as Blue Pills)
- Constellation (L'Association, 2002)
- Pachyderme (Gallimard, 2009)
- Château de sable (Atrabile, 2010; written by Pierre-Oscar Lévy; published in English as Sandcastle)
- L'Odeur des garçons affamés (Casterman, 2016; written by Loo Hui Phang)
- L'Homme gribouillé (Delcourt, 2018; written by Serge Lehman)
- Saccage (Atrabile, 2019)
- Oleg (Atrabile, 2020)

=== Comic series ===
- Lupus (Atrabile, 2003 - 2006; four volumes)
- Koma (Les Humanoïdes Associés, 2003 - 2008; six volumes; written by Pierre Wazem)
- RG (Gallimard, 2007 - 2008; two volumes; with Pierre Dragon)
- Aâma (Gallimard, 2011 - 2014; four volumes)
- Saint-Elme (Delcourt, 2021 - 2024; five volumes; written by Serge Lehman)

== Awards and recognition ==
- 2001 - Töpffer Prize for young Geneva comics creators, for Pilules bleues.
- 2007 - Angoulême Festival "Essentiel" award, for the fourth volume of Lupus.
- 2008 - Angoulême Festival "Essentiel" award, for the first volume of RG.
- 2013 - Series Prize at the Angoulême International Comics Festival, for Aâma.
- 2016 - Prix Landerneau BD, for L'Odeur des garçons affamés.
- 2019 - Delémont'BD Prize for Best Swiss Comic Album, for Saccage.
