= Blue Pills =

2001 graphic memoir by Frederik Peeters

Blue Pills (original title: Pilules Bleues) is a 2001 Swiss-French autobiographical comic written and illustrated by Frederik Peeters. The comic tells the story of a man falling in love with an HIV-positive woman.

The book won the 2001 Prix de la ville de Genève pour la bande dessinée and the 2002 Prix Alph'Art.

In 2014 the graphic novel was adapted into a TV film, directed by Jean-Philippe Amar and broadcast on Arte.
