= Old (film) =

2021 film by M. Night Shyamalan

- Theatrical release poster
- Directed by: M. Night Shyamalan
- Screenplay by: M. Night Shyamalan
- Based on: Sandcastle by: Pierre Oscar Lévy; Frederik Peeters
- Produced by: M. Night Shyamalan; Marc Bienstock; Ashwin Rajan
- Starring: Gael García Bernal; Vicky Krieps; Rufus Sewell; Alex Wolff; Thomasin McKenzie; Abbey Lee; Nikki Amuka-Bird; Ken Leung; Eliza Scanlen; Aaron Pierre; Embeth Davidtz; Emun Elliott
- Cinematography: Michael Gioulakis
- Edited by: Brett M. Reed
- Music by: Trevor Gureckis
- Production companies: Perfect World Pictures; Blinding Edge Pictures
- Distributed by: Universal Pictures
- Release dates: July 19, 2021 (Jazz at Lincoln Center); July 23, 2021 (United States)
- Running time: 108 minutes
- Country: United States
- Language: English
- Budget: $18 million
- Box office: $90.2 million

Old is a 2021 American thriller film written, directed, and produced by M. Night Shyamalan. It is based on the French-language Swiss graphic novel Sandcastle by Pierre Oscar Lévy and Frederik Peeters. The film features an ensemble cast consisting of Gael García Bernal, Vicky Krieps, Rufus Sewell, Alex Wolff, Thomasin McKenzie, Abbey Lee, Nikki Amuka-Bird, Ken Leung, Eliza Scanlen, Aaron Pierre in his film debut, Embeth Davidtz, and Emun Elliott. The plot follows a group of people who find themselves rapidly aging on a secluded beach.

Shyamalan decided to adapt Sandcastle into a film after receiving it as a Father's Day gift in 2017. The untitled project was announced in September 2019, with the filmmaker revealing a partnership with Universal Pictures. Filming took place for three months in the Dominican Republic in 2020, during the first year of the COVID-19 pandemic, with cinematographer Michael Gioulakis.

Old premiered at Jazz at Lincoln Center in New York City on July 19, 2021, and was theatrically released in the United States on July 23. The film grossed $90 million worldwide against an $18 million budget and received mixed reviews from critics.

== Plot ==
Guy and Prisca Cappa are going through a separation. They take their young children, Maddox and Trent, to a tropical resort as a final family vacation. At their hotel, Guy and Prisca are given complimentary drinks by employee Madrid, and the children befriend Idlib, the resort manager Nils' nephew. At night, Maddox and Trent overhear their parents arguing and play a message decoding game from Idlib. During the argument, it is revealed that Prisca has a benign slow-growing ovarian tumor.

The next morning, Nils invites the family to a secluded beach, joined by three additional parties: rapper Brendan "Mid-Sized Sedan" and his female companion, who already arrived; surgeon Charles, his elderly mother Agnes, his wife Chrystal, and their young daughter Kara; and Jarin and Patricia Carmichael, a close-knit husband and wife.

Trent discovers the corpse of Brendan's companion. Charles grows suspicious of Brendan, who reveals that he has been experiencing nosebleeds because of his hemophilia. After the children rapidly turn into teenagers and Agnes suddenly dies, the families conclude that the beach is aging them, with the occupants undergoing the equivalent of one year of aging every 30 minutes. At least one member of each family has an underlying medical condition. They discover that trying to leave will result in them blacking out and waking up back where they left.

In a fit of rage, Charles cuts Brendan with a pocketknife. The group watches as his injury quickly heals. Prisca's supposedly slow-growing ovarian tumor rapidly grows in size at a life-threatening rate. Charles successfully removes it surgically. Brendan discovers that his companion's body has fully decomposed in mere hours. Kara and Trent continue to age into their late teens, and after having sex with each other, Kara gets pregnant at a rapid pace. She gives birth, but the baby starves to death as the time rapidly passes.

The attempts to leave grow increasingly tense as Charles's worsening schizophrenia causes him to kill Brendan. As the day progresses, Jarin drowns while trying to swim for help, Kara falls to her death while trying to climb over the mountain, and Patricia suffers a fatal epileptic seizure. Guy's eyesight blurs, and Prisca suffers hearing loss. Trent and Maddox discover the notebook of a previous traveler filled with names of many people who died on the beach, along with indications of them being watched. At night, Charles attacks Guy and Prisca in a schizophrenic episode; Prisca runs as Charles continues to attack Guy.

Chrystal's hypocalcemia results in her bones repeatedly rupturing and improperly healing, gruesomely contorting her body and eventually killing her. Prisca returns and slashes Charles with a rusted knife, instigating a fatal blood infection that kills him. An elderly Guy and Prisca make amends before dying peacefully of natural causes, moments apart from each other.

With only the now-middle-aged Maddox and Trent remaining by the next morning, the pair construct a sandcastle. They revisit a secret message given to them by Idlib, which Trent deduces is connected to an underwater coral passage. Believing that the passage will allow them to leave the beach without losing consciousness, he and his sister start swimming through the coral. After they seemingly fail to emerge from the water when Maddox gets her swimsuit caught on a coral reef, a resort employee who is monitoring them reports that the entire group has died. His contact, Sidney, alludes to a previous incident where a guest almost escaped from the beach. Nils then announces that trial 73 has concluded.

It is revealed that the resort is a front for a research team from the pharmaceutical company Warren & Warren that was conducting underground clinical trials of new medical drugs, which are administered to guests with medical conditions by spiking their drinks. Because the beach naturally accelerates the lives of the subjects, the researchers have been able to complete the lifelong drug trials within a day.

Nils and Madrid prepare to lure a new group to the beach, but are interrupted by Trent and Maddox, who survived their underwater swim, using the notebook as evidence that they give to vacationing police officer Greg Mitchel. Discovering everyone listed in the notebook is a missing person, he informs his boss of the researchers' crimes. The researchers are mentioned to have been arrested, with subpoenas sent to the rest of Warren & Warren, as Greg plans to reunite Trent and Maddox with their aunt.

== Cast ==
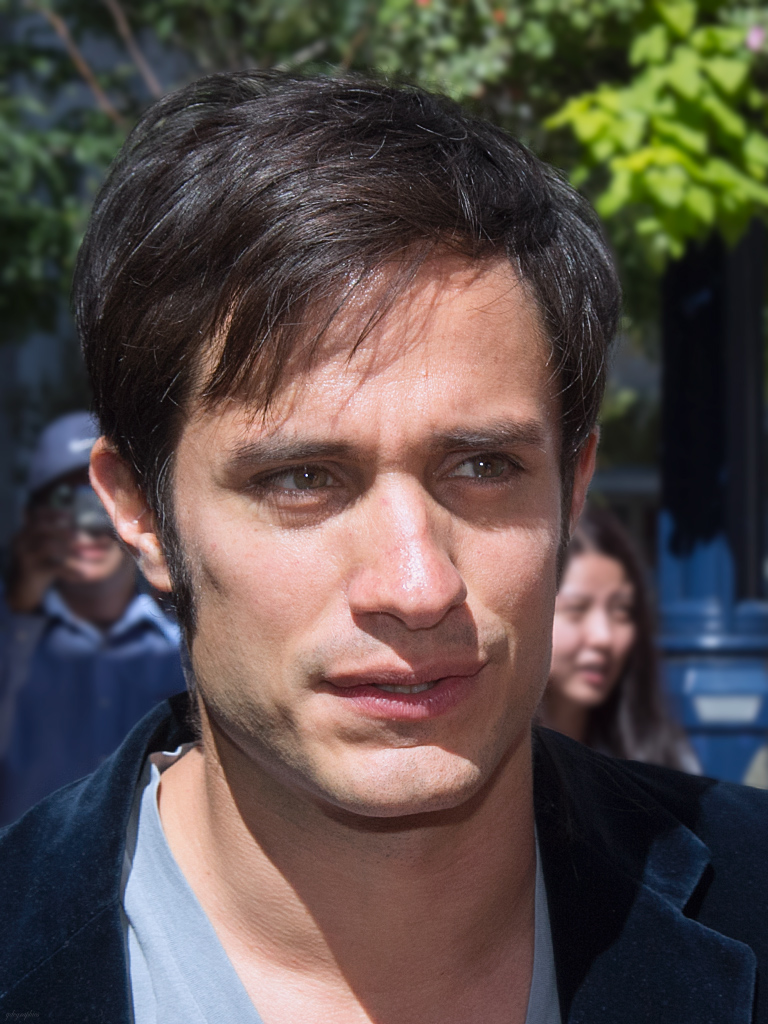
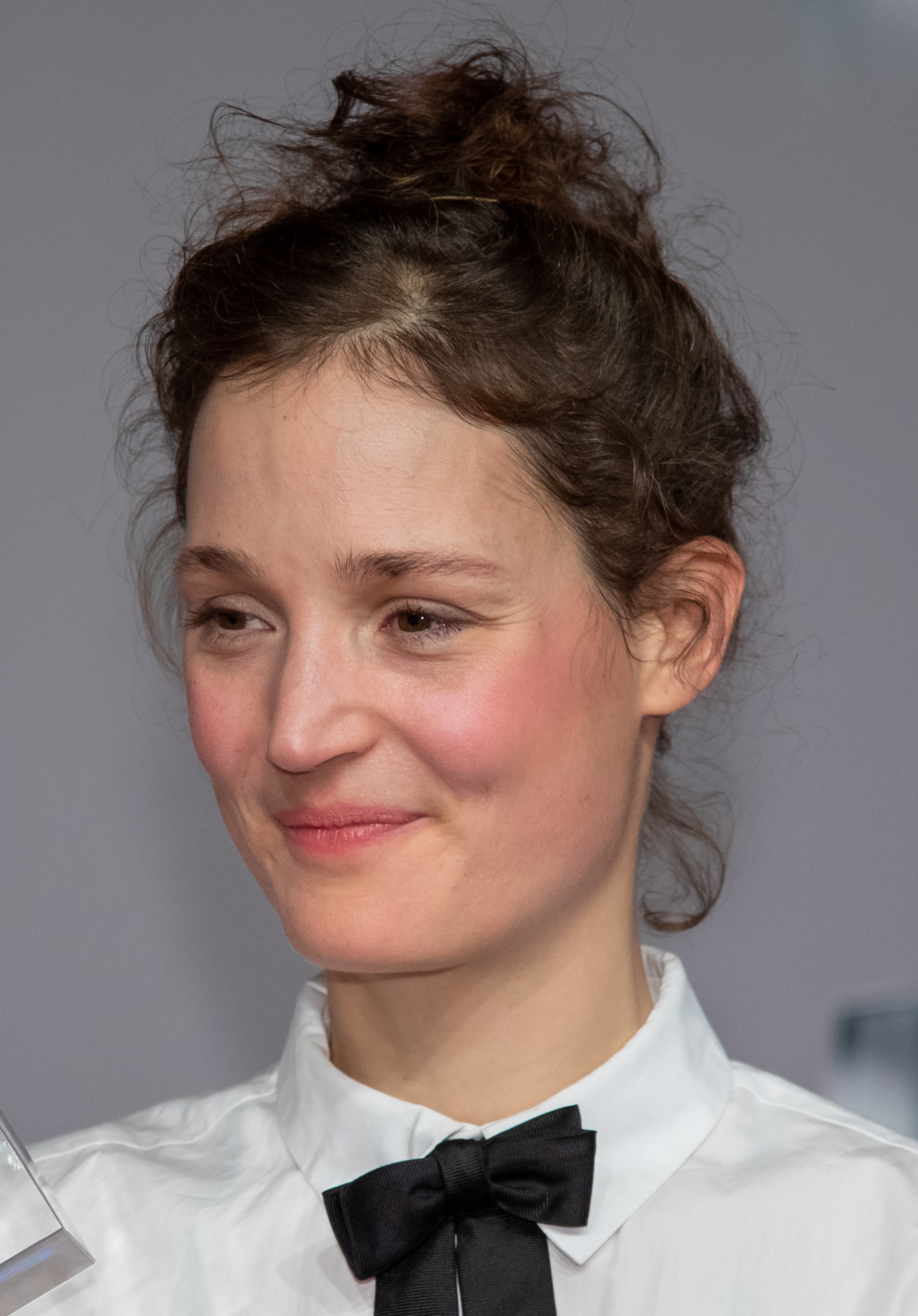
Gael García Bernal (left) and Vicky Krieps star as married couple Guy and Prisca Cappa
- Gael García Bernal as Guy Cappa, an actuary married to Prisca
- Vicky Krieps as Prisca Cappa, a museum curator and Guy's wife, who has an ovarian tumor
- Alex Wolff as Trent Cappa, Guy and Prisca's son (age 15)
  - Emun Elliott as adult Trent Cappa
  - Luca Faustino Rodriguez as Trent Cappa (age 11)
  - Nolan River as Trent Cappa (age 6)
- Thomasin McKenzie as Maddox Cappa, Guy and Prisca's daughter (age 16)
  - Embeth Davidtz as adult Maddox Cappa
  - Alexa Swinton as Maddox Cappa (age 11)
- Rufus Sewell as Charles, a schizophrenic cardiac surgeon married to Chrystal
- Abbey Lee as Chrystal, Charles's trophy wife with hypocalcemia
- Eliza Scanlen as Kara, Charles and Chrystal's daughter (age 15)
  - Mikaya Fisher as Kara (age 11)
  - Kylie Begley as Kara (age 6)
- Nikki Amuka-Bird as Patricia Carmichael, an epileptic psychologist married to Jarin
- Ken Leung as Jarin Carmichael, a nurse and Patricia's husband
- Aaron Pierre as Mid-Sized Sedan/Brendan, a rapper with hemophilia

Additional cast members include Kathleen Chalfant as Agnes, Charles' mother; Gustaf Hammarsten as Nils, the resort manager who heads the secret research team for the pharmaceutical company Warren & Warren; Francesca Eastwood and Matthew Shear as resort employees Madrid and Sidney; Kailen Jude as the Nils's nephew Idlib; Daniel Ison as vacationing police officer Greg Mitchel; and M. Night Shyamalan as the resort employee who drives the guests to the beach and monitors them.

== Themes ==
When NME's Beth Webb asked about the different themes tackled in Old, Shyamalan responded, "It's definitely about our relationship to time and, in my opinion, our dysfunctional relationship to time that we all have. Until we're forced to examine it, whether it's a pandemic or the factors that are in this situation for these characters, they're trapped on this beach, and they have to reflect on their relationship over time. You see some characters unable to navigate this, and then some characters find peace. Why did they find peace, and how did they find peace in the midst of all of this chaos? So there's this conversation about that, the one that I'm having of myself with time."

At the Tribeca Film Festival, Shyamalan said that the film's focus on aging reminded him of his father, who has dementia, and his children as he watches them grow up. During the event, Alex Wolff compared the film to the COVID-19 pandemic, "Coming out of COVID, it feels like time just stopped. And that's what the movie's literally about." At the film's premiere, Wolff was asked for his interpretation of the film and said it was "an allegorical existential sort of meditation on getting older." Other cast members chimed in; Nikki Amuka-Bird said the film was about not taking nature for granted; Gael García Bernal said it was about questioning how time travels differently for other people; and Vicky Krieps found that it was about "love and family and all these things that are much stronger than any fears — the fear of aging and the fear of death."

== Production ==
=== Development and casting ===
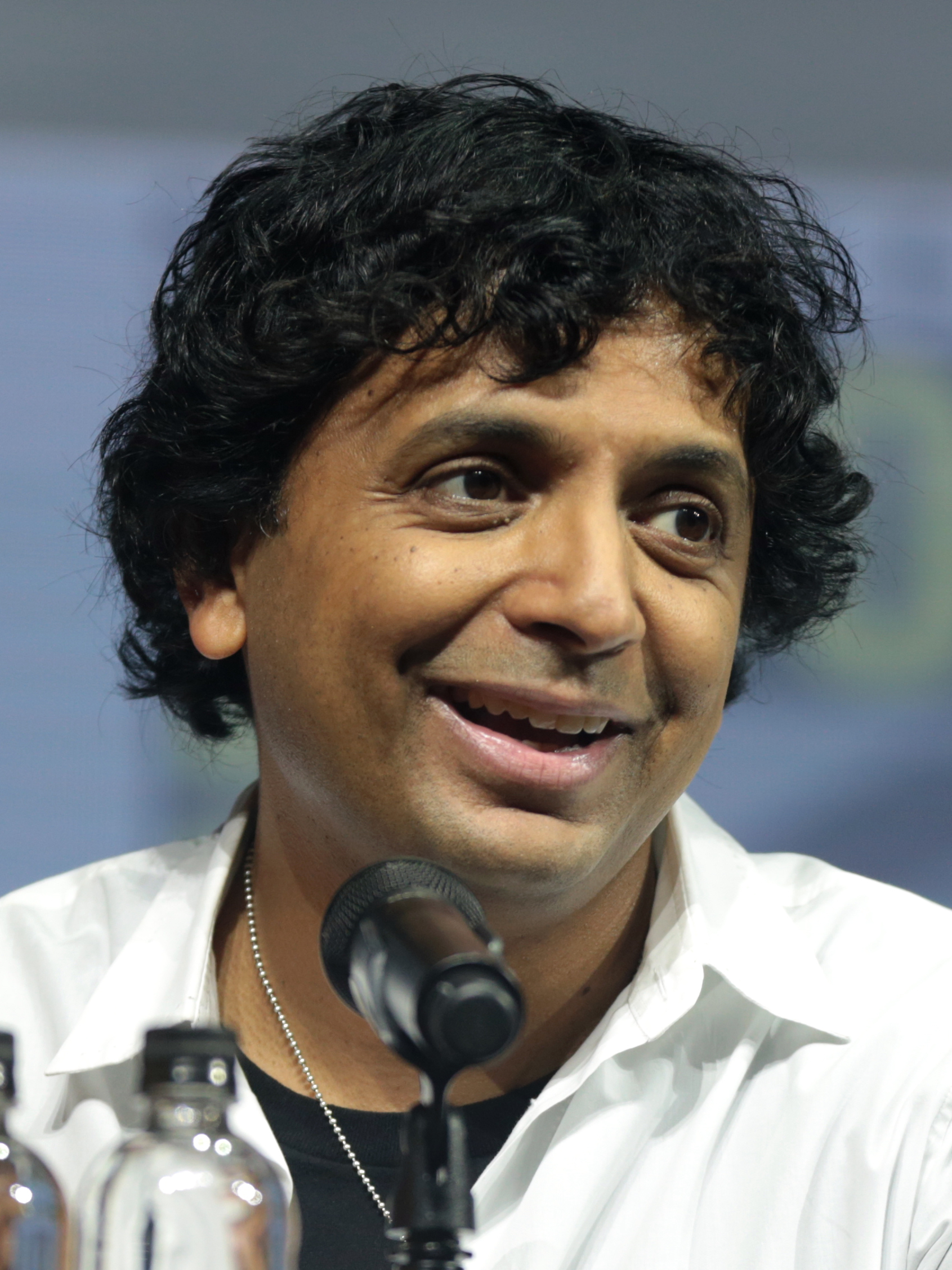
Writer, director, and producer M. Night Shyamalan

In September 2019, Universal Pictures announced its plans to distribute two then-untitled independently financed thriller films written and directed by M. Night Shyamalan. In a statement, Universal Pictures President Peter Cramer said that these projects contained "highly original stories," while Shyamalan added, "There are wonderful studios out there, but Universal has made it a mandate to release original films. They are the best at finding an audience for new stories with unexpected tones. I believe original films are crucial to the longevity of the theatrical experience."

In May 2020, Eliza Scanlen, Thomasin McKenzie, Aaron Pierre, Alex Wolff, and Vicky Krieps entered negotiations to star. That June, they all joined the cast alongside Abbey Lee, Nikki Amuka-Bird, and Ken Leung. In July, it was reported that Shyamalan, Marc Bienstock, and Ashwin Rajan would produce the project through Perfect World Pictures and Blinding Edge Pictures, with Gael García Bernal also being cast. In August, Rufus Sewell, Embeth Davidtz, and Emun Elliott were all announced as part of the ensemble cast. That same month, Bryan Cranston said he had declined a role in the film due to a scheduling conflict caused by his involvement with filming Your Honor in New Orleans.

=== Filming and post-production ===
On September 26, 2020, principal photography began in the Dominican Republic, and to celebrate, Shyamalan revealed the film's title and published its first promotional release poster. That same day, Collider reported that the film was an adaptation of Sandcastle, the French graphic novel by Swiss authors Pierre Oscar Levy and Frederik Peeters, which Shyamalan had received as a collective Father's Day gift from his three daughters in 2017. Old marks the first film of Shyamalan's career to have no shooting take place around his hometown of Philadelphia, Pennsylvania. With an $18 million budget, filming took place during the first year of the COVID-19 pandemic with cinematographer Michael Gioulakis, using 35mm film, and concluded on November 15, 2020. After filming wrapped, Shyamalan said Old was the first film to be shot during the pandemic in the Dominican Republic and that, throughout the shoot, no one tested positive for the virus as he paid for the production crew's ten-week stay at a hotel.

Old was inspired by films created during the Australian New Wave, including Walkabout (1971) and Picnic at Hanging Rock (1975), along with The Exterminating Angel (1962), Kuroneko (1968), Jaws (1975), and The Twilight Zone. To create a claustrophobic feeling, Shyamalan employed several filming techniques from Akira Kurosawa's Rashomon (1950) and Ran (1985). As a result, Old was mostly filmed in a single location, the Playa El Valle beach located between two mountains on the north coast of Santa Bárbara de Samaná. Additional filming took place at Pinewood Dominican Republic Studios in Juan Dolio and in several locations around Samaná. To capture footage of the surrounding nature, Shyamalan's daughter, Ishana, served as the film's second unit director. His other daughter, Saleka Shyamalan, wrote an original song for the film titled "Remain" that was inspired by the topic of marriage vows and U2's "With or Without You," used to "highlight the relationship between Guy and Prisca and the love that exists between them."

Several cast members recalled Shyamalan using storyboards to frame every shot in the film. Ishana Shyamalan described her father's choice as a "very prescribed and programmatic" approach, while Wolff said the director "had such precision in terms of what age he wanted you to be and where he wanted you to be at that age. Night would just guide you where you needed to be emotionally, and then it would happen naturally." Wolff said he and McKenzie were the first actors to be cast after submitting audition tapes, and recalled passing out during the filming of the pregnancy scene due to high temperatures. During post-production, editing was completed by Brett M. Reed. The film's score was composed by Trevor Gureckis and released by Back Lot Music on July 23, 2021.

== Release ==
Old was originally going to be released by Universal Pictures on February 26, 2021, but in April 2020, the film was removed from the studio's release schedule after its film Nobody was delayed due to the COVID-19 pandemic. In June 2020, Universal Pictures announced that Old would be theatrically released on July 23, 2021. A premiere for the film was held at Jazz at Lincoln Center in New York City on July 19, 2021, which was attended by its cast and crew.

On February 7, 2021, during Super Bowl LV, Universal Pictures aired a 30-second television spot for Old. Anthony D'Alessandro from Deadline Hollywood said the teaser reminded him of a two-part episode of The Brady Bunch, where an ancient tiki brings the group bad luck and causes Greg (Barry Williams) to suffer a surfing accident. Writing for Syfy Wire, Josh Weiss said the teaser "definitely bears Shyamalan's signature slow-boil tension." On May 27, 2021, a theatrical release poster and an official trailer were released, which Variety's Antonio Ferme said brought "thrills and chills," and Weiss described as "a reverse Benjamin Button situation that the characters need to reverse before they shrivel up and die." That July, an exclusive image of the film was released in a magazine issue of Empire.

Summarizing the film's marketing results, RelishMix wrote that it was being compared to A Quiet Place Part II and The Conjuring 3, Shyamalan's Split and Glass, and Edgar Wright's Last Night in Soho, as well as ABC's Lost. The site added that there were "Conversational tones swings from excitement, fear, curiosity, caution, warnings to the characters in the film — to questions about the pregnant girl and numerous guesses about how the films ends and plot twists." By July 2021, the film's promotional content had been viewed a total of 113.2 million times, which included 41.2 million views from three YouTube videos and 30.3 million views from nineteen videos on Facebook. According to Universal Pictures, the Super Bowl teaser was viewed at least 100 million times, but overall, videos promoting the film "[fell] short of the norm along with daily click-rates." A Snapchat aging filter created for the film also gained 23 million views worldwide on its first day after it was used by celebrities such as Shaquille O'Neal, Kenny Smith, and Charles Barkley.

Universal Pictures Home Entertainment released Old on Digital HD via digital distribution on October 5, 2021, with a physical release on Ultra HD Blu-ray, Blu-ray, and DVD on October 19. Special features include deleted scenes; "Shyamalan Family Business," a look into Ishana and Saleka Shyamalan's contributions to the film; "All the Beach Is a Stage" and "Nightmares in Paradise," detailing the filming process; and "A Family in the Moment," featuring cast members describing a specific night of filming.

== Reception ==
=== Box office ===
Old grossed $48.3 million in the United States and Canada, and $41.9 million in other territories, for a worldwide total of $90.2 million.

A week before its release, Variety and Deadline Hollywood reported that film analytics had predicted the film would make $12–15 million in its opening weekend, with some noting that its competition, which had the same target audience, could impact box office revenues. Released alongside Snake Eyes and Joe Bell on July 23, 2021, in 3,355 theaters, Old made $6.9 million on its first day, including $1.5 million from Thursday night previews. With audiences that were 52% female and 62% at or over the age of 25, it went on to debut to $16.85 million, making it the sixth film of Shyamalan's to top the box office, though it marked the lowest opening weekend of his career.

Describing the openings of Old and Snake Eyes as "weak," Michael Cieply wrote an analysis to explain the audience decline at the box office, streaming sites, and television by using Occam's razor, "Maybe, as a group, we are suffering from 'screen fatigue' — not in the narrow sense of migraines, eye strain, and Computer Vision Syndrome, but in a much bigger way, as a culture. We are tired of Zoom calls. We are tired of event television. We are really tired of looking at ourselves on media screens, large and small." In its second weekend, the film experienced a 60% decline and grossed $6.86 million. After making $4.1 million in its third, Old dropped out of the box office top five in its fourth weekend with $2.4 million. In its fifth and sixth weekends, the film fell to the bottom of the box office top ten, making $1.15 million and $840,810, respectively.

Worldwide, Old made $6.5 million in its opening weekend in 23 markets; the top countries were Russia ($2.1 million), the United Kingdom ($1.1 million), Mexico ($800,000), Italy ($600,000), and France ($500,000). In its second, the film had a 35% drop and grossed $7.5 million, including a $1.2 million opening in Spain. After making $4.4 million in its third weekend, it made $2 million in its fifth and held a Korean opening in a mere 453 theaters, a decision by the Korea Theater Association to release local titles instead. In its sixth weekend, Old was screened in 57 markets and made $1.64 million. It made $277,000 in its ninth weekend and $169,000 in its tenth across 60 foreign markets.

=== Critical response ===
Metacritic review
breakdown (unweighted)

Positive
23 (43%)
Mixed
26 (49%)
Negative
4 (8%)

On the review aggregator website Rotten Tomatoes, 50% of 344 critics' reviews are positive, with an average rating of 5.50/10. The website's consensus reads: "Old has no shortage of interesting ideas -- and writer-director M. Night Shyamalan's uneven execution will intrigue or annoy viewers, with little middle ground between." Metacritic, which uses a weighted average, assigned the film a score of 55 out of 100, based on 53 critics, indicating "mixed or average" reviews. Audiences polled by CinemaScore gave the film an average grade of "C+" on an A+ to F scale, while PostTrak reported 61% of audience members gave it a positive score, with 37% saying they would definitely recommend it.

Old received criticism for its screenplay and dialogue. Wendy Ide of The Observer said the film's exposition felt "ponderous and mannered" and asked: "If we can't believe the characters, how are we meant to accept the film's central premise?" WXIX-TV's Terrence "TT" Todd gave a similar response and said that while the premise was interesting, the plot was confusing and could have been explained better as its own television series. From Vox, Alissa Wilkinson wrote that "Shyamalan has not grown any more skilled at writing dialogue over the years," but found that at its best, the film was comparable to Luis Buñuel's The Exterminating Angel. Barry Hertz of The Globe and Mail said that the director had "stilted dialogue that runs in circles, dumb-dumb plot holes, [and] a bizarre determination to have his performers act as unnaturally as possible." However, some critics enjoyed the gallows humor in the movie. Germain Lussier of Gizmodo said the movie was made with sadistic glee and surprising emotion. Nick Allen of The Playlist called it a pitch-black comedy and self-aware horror. Scott Mendelson of Forbes said it would have benefited from an R rating and described it as a "relentless and mean little chiller".

The film's cinematography and premise received praise. While criticizing the film in general, Jocelyn Novec from the Associated Press said it had "an enticing premise and pretty scenery." In his Deadline Hollywood review, Pete Hammond wrote, "I don't expect this one to age very well, and some of it is just laughably bad. At the very least, as a summertime theatrical release, the stunning location should give audiences a nice respite from the heat." Critic Richard Roeper described the film's main location as "absolutely breathtaking," and The New Yorker's Richard Brody wrote that "with spare methods and sharp images, the director turns a simple premise into potent fantasy."

The film's themes and twist ending received a polarized response. Sandcastle, the novel the film is based on, ends without explaining why the beach ages its guests, and Wilkinson found that ending to be "more satisfying." From ABC News, Peter Travers said he was "shocked" to find "how clumsily [Shyamalan] handles potent themes about sudden death and the collapse of time that should resonate powerfully in the COVID-19 era. Even his argument for family values in the face of global youth worship feels rote." Writing for The New York Times, Glenn Kenny said, "Shyamalan's fluid filmmaking style serves him especially well here [and] the way he switches out his actors as their characters age is seamless," but found that "while Shyamalan is often cited for his tricky endings, it's arguable that he doesn't quite stick the landing with this one."

=== Accolades ===
Accolades received by Old
Award	Date of ceremony	Category	Recipient(s)	Result	Ref.
Dorian Awards	March 17, 2022	Campiest Flick	Old	Nominated	
Florida Film Critics Circle	December 22, 2021	Best Cinematography	Michael Gioulakis	Nominated	
Hollywood Music in Media Awards	November 17, 2021	Best Original Score — Horror Film	Trevor Gureckis	Nominated	
Imagen Awards	October 2, 2022	Best Actor – Feature Film	Gael García Bernal	Nominated	
People's Choice Awards	December 7, 2021	Drama Movie of the Year	Old	Nominated	
Saturn Awards	October 25, 2022	Best Thriller Film	Old	Nominated	

== See also ==
- "Død Kalm", a 1995 episode of The X-Files, with a similar premise
- "Thinner", a 1984 novel by Stephen King with a similar premise
