= Topside (film) =

2020 American film by Celine Held and Logan George

- Theatrical release poster
- Directed by: Celine Held; Logan George
- Written by: Celine Held; Logan George
- Produced by: Anthony Bregman; Peter Cron; Kara Durrett; Jonathan Montepare; Melina Lizette; Josh Godfrey; Daniel Crown
- Starring: Zhaila Farmer; Celine Held; Jared Abrahamson; Fatlip
- Cinematography: Lowell A. Meyer
- Edited by: Logan George
- Music by: David Baloche
- Production companies: K Period Media; Level Forward; Red Crown; Likely Story; Elo Films
- Distributed by: Vertical Entertainment
- Release dates: September 2020 (Venice Film Festival); March 25, 2022 (United States)
- Running time: 90 minutes
- Country: United States
- Language: English

Topside is a 2020 American drama film written and directed by Celine Held and Logan George. It stars Zhaila Farmer, Celine Held, Jared Abrahamson, and Fatlip. The film premiered at the Venice Film Festival in September 2020. It was released in the United States on March 25, 2022, by Vertical Entertainment.

== Synopsis ==
In New York City, a mother and daughter live in abandoned subway tunnels underneath the city. When events force them elsewhere, they flee aboveground where they confront a difficult night in wintertime.

== Cast ==
- Zhaila Farmer as Little
- Celine Held as Nikki
- Jared Abrahamson as Les
- Fatlip as John
- Cynthia Tombros as Lolly
- George Doerner
- Tarra Riggs
- Kevin Tanski as Tunnel Policeman
- Daria Somers

== Release ==
The film premiered at the Venice Film Festival in September 2020. Then it made its U.S. premiere at the South by Southwest, where it won the Jury Award for Best Director. In February 2022, Vertical Entertainment acquired the film's distribution rights.

== Reception ==
On the review aggregator website Rotten Tomatoes, 73% of 15 reviews are positive, with an average rating of 7.1/10.

Sheri Linden of The Hollywood Reporter called it "A striking debut, cinematic and affecting." Eric Kohn of IndieWire wrote, "The whole concept of a lo-fi New York movie shot on the streets has been done and redone so many times that it risks cliché, but Topside works as well it does because it never tries to reinvent that playbook."

Brian Tallerico of RogerEbert.com gave the film a negative review and wrote, "Everyone here means well, and there’s a commitment to the entire venture that’s admirable, but this falls deep into what is often referred to as “poverty porn,” something that feels more manipulative in its depiction of misery than genuinely empathetic or artistic."
