= Eliza Scanlen =

Australian actress (born 1999)

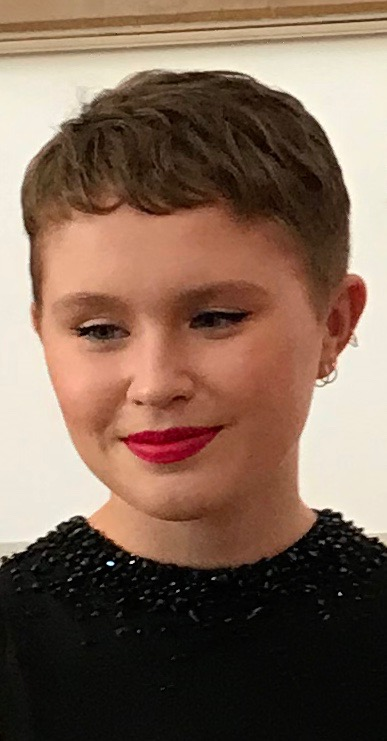
- Scanlen in 2019
- Born: Eliza Jane Scanlen; 6 January 1999 (age 27); Sydney, Australia
- Occupation: Actress
- Years active: 2015–present

Eliza Jane Scanlen (born 6 January 1999) is an Australian actress. She rose to prominence portraying Tabitha Ford in the Australian soap opera Home and Away (2016), before receiving critical acclaim for playing a troubled teenager in the HBO miniseries Sharp Objects (2018) and the BBC series Dope Girls (2025).

Scanlen expanded to films in 2019 with her roles in the drama Babyteeth and Greta Gerwig's period drama Little Women. She has since portrayed a young Eleanor Roosevelt in the Showtime series The First Lady (2022) and starred in the mystery film Caddo Lake (2024).

== Early life ==
Scanlen was born in Sydney, New South Wales, Australia, and has a fraternal twin sister named Annabel. She attended school at Loreto Kirribilli. She learned the piano when she was about seven years old, but stopped playing when she was 13 years old. In preparation for her role as Beth March in the 2019 film adaptation of Little Women, she started practicing the piano again.

== Career ==
While in high school, Scanlen was cast in the recurring role of Tabitha Ford on television soap opera Home and Away. Scanlen starred as the titular character in the 2018 short film Grace. She then achieved recognition for her portrayal of Amma Crellin in the HBO psychological thriller miniseries Sharp Objects, in which she stars alongside Amy Adams.

Scanlen made her professional theatre debut in Sydney Theatre Company's 2019 production of Lord of the Flies, directed by Kip Williams. She played the role of Eric for the play's run. She made her feature film debut as Milla Finlay in Shannon Murphy's Babyteeth, which premiered in competition at Venice Film Festival. In 2019, she portrayed Beth March in Greta Gerwig's adaptation of Louisa May Alcott's novel Little Women, co-starring alongside Saoirse Ronan, Emma Watson, Florence Pugh, Laura Dern, Timothée Chalamet, and Meryl Streep. The film received six Academy Award nominations (including Best Picture), and grossed $218 million at the box office.

In 2020, Scanlen portrayed Lenora in Antonio Campos' thriller The Devil All the Time, based on Donald Ray Pollock's book. In the same year she made her directional debut with the Australian short film Mukbang which received much controversy, she also wrote the screen play. In 2021, Scanlen co-starred in M. Night Shyamalan's thriller Old, which was released on 23 July.

In 2023, Scanlen had the lead role of Jem Starling in Laurel Parmet's directorial debut The Starling Girl. She received critical acclaim for her performance, with Ben Travers of IndieWire writing: "It helps that Scanlen's performance refuses to let this movie feel trite." Jason Bailey for The Playlist wrote: "Scanlen's work here is just as good, just as steeped in the feeling of a real-life being lived right in front of you."

In 2024, Scanlen played Cecily Cardew in the National Theatre's acclaimed revival of Oscar Wilde's The Importance of Being Earnest, starring alongside Ncuti Gatwa, Hugh Skinner, Ronkẹ Adékoluẹjo, and Sharon D. Clarke.

== Filmography ==
=== Film ===
Eliza Scanlen film credits
Year	Title	Role	Notes
2019	Babyteeth	Milla Finlay	
2019	Little Women	Elizabeth "Beth" March	
2020	The Devil All the Time	Lenora Laferty	
2021	Old	Kara (15 years old)	
2023	The Starling Girl	Jem Starling	
2024	Caddo Lake	Ellie	

=== Short ===
Eliza Scanlen short film credits
Year	Title	Role	Director	Writer	Ref.
2018	Grace	Grace	No	No	
2020	Mukbang	-	Yes	Yes	
2022	How Can I Help You	-	Yes	Yes	

=== Television ===
Eliza Scanlen television credits
Year	Title	Role	Notes
2016	Home and Away	Tabitha Ford	Recurring role
2018	Sharp Objects	Amma Crellin	Main cast, miniseries
2021	Fires	Tash	Main cast, miniseries
2022	The First Lady	Eleanor Roosevelt (young)	
2025	Dope Girls	Violet Davies	9 episodes

=== Theatre ===
Eliza Scanlen theatrical credits
Year	Title	Role	Notes
2019	William Golding's Lord of the Flies	Eric	Sydney Theatre Company
2019	To Kill a Mockingbird	Mayella Ewell	Shubert Theatre
2024	The Importance of Being Earnest	Cecily Cardew	Royal National Theatre

== See also ==
- List of Australian film actors
