= List of career achievements by Serena Williams =

This page lists various career, tournament, and seasonal achievements by tennis player Serena Williams.

Williams has won a record 13 Grand Slam singles titles on hard court. She holds the Open Era record for most women's singles titles at the Australian Open (7) and shares with Chris Evert the Open Era record for most titles won at the US Open (6). She also holds the records for the most women's singles matches won at majors (367) and most singles majors won since turning 30 years old (10). She is the only tennis player, male or female, to win three of the four Grand Slams at least 6 times. She is also a five-time winner of the WTA Tour Championships in the singles division.

In doubles, the Williams sisters have the third most women's doubles Grand Slam titles, behind the 18 titles of Natasha Zvereva (14 with Gigi Fernandez) and the record 20 titles won by Martina Navratilova and Pam Shriver. Serena and Venus are the only tennis players in history with four Olympic gold medals (three in women's doubles together and one each in singles), and to win Olympic gold in the same event on three occasions. They are the only women tennis players in the Open Era to win Olympic gold in both the singles and doubles categories. At the 2012 Summer Olympics, Serena Williams became only the third player to win Olympic gold medals in both singles and doubles at one Olympic Games, after Helen Wills Moody at the 1924 Summer Olympics and Venus at the 2000 Sydney Olympics. Williams is the only singles player, male or female, to accomplish a Career Golden Slam in both singles and doubles.

== Records ==
=== Grand Slam tournaments ===
- At the 1999 US Open, became the second African-American woman to win a Grand Slam title at 17 years old
- By winning the 2001 Australian Open doubles championship with Venus Williams, became the fifth pair to complete a Career Doubles Grand Slam and the first pair to win a Career Doubles Golden Slam.
- At the 2001 US Open, marked the first time in the Open Era, and the second time in 117 years that sisters met in a Grand Slam final (with Venus Williams)
- At the 2002 Roland Garros final, she became the first younger sister to defeat her older sister in a Grand Slam singles tournament.
- At the 2002 Roland Garros, she defeated her older sister Venus for the first time as a Grand Slam final victory
- By winning the 2003 Australian Open, became the fifth woman to hold all four Grand Slam singles titles simultaneously.
- By winning the 2003 Australian Open, became the first African-American to win the championship.
- By winning the 2003 Australian Open, she became the sixth player to win a Career Grand Slam.
- By winning the 2003 Wimbledon ladies' title, Williams became just the fifth woman in the Open Era to win back-to-back Wimbledon crowns. She followed Billie Jean King, Martina Navratilova, Steffi Graf, and Venus Williams. Since then, the feat has been accomplished 3 more times, once by Venus Williams and twice by Serena Williams.
- By reaching the final of the 2003 Australian Open, she and sister Venus became the first players to compete in 4 consecutive Grand Slam finals.
- By winning the 2005 Australian Open, by defeating Mauresmo and Davenport, became the only player in tennis history to win three Grand Slam singles titles (1999 U.S. Opens, 2002 Roland Garros) by beating the top two ranked players.
- By winning the 2007 Australian Open, became the first unseeded player since Chris O'Neil (1978) to win a Grand Slam. She was ranked #81 in the world.
- Her six-year gap between Wimbledon titles (2003–2009) is second only to Evonne Goolagong Cawley's nine years in the Open Era.
- Her eleven-year gap between Roland Garros titles (2002–2013) is the longest in the Open Era.
- Only player to have won three Grand Slam singles titles after saving match points (2003 Australian Open versus Kim Clijsters, 2005 Australian Open versus Maria Sharapova, and 2009 Wimbledon versus Elena Dementieva).
- Against Elena Dementieva, she played the longest recorded Wimbledon women's semifinal (2009) in the Open Era: 2 hours, 49 minutes.
- By winning the 2010 Roland Garros doubles with sister Venus, they became the first pair since 1998 to hold the four doubles slams at the same time.
- By winning the 2010 Roland Garros doubles with sister Venus, they became the first pair in the Open Era to complete the Career Doubles Golden Slam twice (2001 & 2003 Australian Open, 1999 & 2010 Roland Garros, 2000 & 2002 Wimbledon, 1999 & 2009 U.S. Open, and 2000 & 2008 Olympic gold medalists).
- In 2012 Wimbledon, in her semifinal match against Azarenka, she hit a record 24 aces in a match, which was surpassed by Sabine Lisicki at the 2015 Aegon Classic in Birmingham.
- At the 2012 Wimbledon Championships, she set a record for most aces served in a tournament, hitting 102 aces in the tournament, which was the most of men or women at the Championships that year.
- In 2014, she won her 6th US Open title, the most in the Open Era (tied with Evert)
- In 2017, she won her 7th Australian Open title, the most in the Open Era (stands alone).
- Most hardcourt grand slam singles titles: 13 [7 Australian Open & 6 US Open] (stands alone).
- In 2015, she won her 6th Wimbledon title. She became the only person in history, male or female, to win three of the four grand slams 6 times (AO 2003/2005/2007/2009/2010/2015, WIM 2002/2003/2009/2010/2012/2015, and USO 1999/2002/2008/2012/2013/2014).
- She is only the fourth woman in the Open Era to win a tournament six or more times after Steffi Graf, Chris Evert, and Martina Navratilova. She's won 8 Miami Masters, 7 Australian Opens, 7 Wimbledons, and 6 US Open titles.
- She is also only the third player to achieve a Career Grand Slam in singles and doubles after Margaret Court and Martina Navratilova
- Second player to win a Grand Slam singles title in three decades after Martina Navratilova (USO 1999, FO 2002, AO 2010)
- Winner of all four Grand Slam singles titles in two decades (along with Court and Graf)
- Longest span between first (2003) and last (2017) Australian Open titles: 14 years (tied with Nancye Wynne Bolton)
- Longest span between first (2002) and last (2015) Roland Garros titles: 13 years
- Longest span between first (2002) and last (2016) Wimbledon titles: 14 years
- Longest span between first (1999) and last (2014) US Open titles: 15 years
- Roland Garros 2015, Williams became the first woman to win 50+ career matches in all four Grand Slams in the Open Era.
- Roland Garros 2016, Williams became the first woman to win 60+ career matches in all four Grand Slams in the Open Era (AO 74 match wins, FO 60 match wins, WIM 79 match wins, and USO 84 match wins).
- Roland Garros 2015, became first woman to win a Grand Slam tournament losing five sets en route to the title
- Oldest player to hold all Grand Slam singles titles simultaneously (2014–2015)
- In 2015, Williams won 4 consecutive Grand Slam titles for the second time in her career, also accomplishing the feat in 2002–2003. She and Steffi Graf are the only two players in the Open Era to win 4 consecutive Grand Slam singles titles on 2 separate occasions.
- First player, male or female, to complete a Career Golden Slam after turning 30 years of age (WIM 2012, OLY 2012, USO 2012, FO 2013, AO 2015). (matched by Novak Djokovic WIM 2018, USO 2018, AO 2019, FO 2021, OLY 2024)
- Third female player to win 70+ matches at 3 of the 4 Grand Slam events. She had AO 70 match wins, WIM 79 match wins, USO 84 match wins. (tied with Steffi Graf who had USO 73 match wins, WIM 75 match wins, and FO 87 match wins, and Chris Evert who had FO 72 match wins, WIM 98 match wins, and USO 103 match wins)
- In 2017, Williams became the first player, male or female, to win 80+ matches at 3 of the 4 Grand Slam events. She had AO 81 match wins, WIM 86 match wins, USO 89 match wins. Remains the only female to hold this distinction as Novak Djokovic matched it in 2021.
- In 2016, she won her 7th Wimbledon singles title, the 2nd most in the Open Era (tied with Steffi Graf, only behind Martina Navratilova's 9 titles).
- In 2016, won 6th Wimbledon doubles title with Venus Williams. It was the 4th time Serena Williams won the singles and doubles titles at Wimbledon in the same year (2002, 2009, 2012, 2016). Venus also accomplished this feat twice (2000, 2008).
- Serena and Venus Williams improved their Grand Slam doubles finals record to 14–0. Only Martina Navratilova/Pam Shriver own more Grand Slam doubles titles as a team with 20 championships.
- In 2017, by virtue of her 7th Australian Open singles title, she won her 23rd Grand Slam singles title and surpassed Steffi Graf's Open Era record of 22. Williams now trails only Margaret Court's all-time record of 24 Grand Slam singles titles. (During Court's Australian Open wins from 1960 to 1964, there were less than 50 athletes per Australian Open. Current Grand Slams have 128 athletes in every main draw. This is why there is often a reference to the Open Era which started in 1968. 13 of Court's 24 Grand Slam singles titles came before the Open Era.)
- Williams holds a 367-56 singles record in Grand Slams, winning 165 of those since turning 30 years old. Her 367 Grand Slam singles match wins is an Open Era record.
- Her 2017 Australian Open crown was her 10th Grand Slam singles title since reaching her 30th birthday. No other female player has won more than 3 Grand Slam singles titles after turning 30 years of age. (Note: Steffi Graf was 29 years, 11 months and 22 days when she won Roland Garros on 5 June 1999, shortly before retiring.)
- Williams has won 10 of the 12 Grand Slam titles to complete the Box Set (winning the singles, same gender doubles, and mixed doubles in each of the four Grand Slam tournaments). The only 2 she's lacking are the mixed doubles titles at Roland Garros and the Australian Open. Her best finishes in those events were runner-up finishes at the 1998 Roland Garros and 1999 Australian Open.
- Serena is the only player, male or female, to win 10+ grand slam singles titles in two separate decades (10 in the 2000s and 12 in the 2010s).
- Has won 6 major titles without dropping a set, tied with Navratilova for the most by any woman in the Open Era.

=== Prize money and earnings ===
- First woman to win US$6,000,000 in prize money in a single year: 2009.
- First, and only, woman to win US$12,000,000 in prize money in a single year: 2013. (Record: $12,385,572)
- As of 23 Feb 2022, of the 15 highest single-year earnings ($6.5 million and up), Serena occupies 6 of them.
- As of 23 Feb 2022, of the 5 highest single-year earnings ($9.3 million and up), Serena occupies 3 of them. No. 1 - $12,385,572, No. 3 - $10,582,642, and No. 5 - $9,317,298.
- First woman, and 1 of only 2 women, to win US$40,000,000 in career prize money in 2014. (Her sister, Venus, joined her in 2011)
- First, and only, woman to win US$50,000,000 in career prize money in 2013.
- First, and only, woman to win US$60,000,000 in career prize money in 2014.
- First, and only, woman to win US$70,000,000 in career prize money in 2015.
- First, and only, woman to win US$80,000,000 in career prize money in 2016.
- First, and only, woman to win US$90,000,000 in career prize money in 2019.
- Holds the record for most seasons (21) earning US$1,000,000 or more. In 1999–2005 and 2007–2020.
- Holds the record for most seasons (17) earning US$2,000,000 or more. In 1999, 2001–2004, 2007–2010, and 2012–2019.
- Holds the record for most seasons (6) earning US$5,000,000 or more. In 2009, 2012, 2013, 2014, 2015, and 2016.
- Holds the record for most seasons (6) earning US$6,000,000 or more. In 2009, 2012, 2013, 2014, 2015, and 2016.
- Holds the record for most seasons (5) earning US$7,000,000 or more. In 2012, 2013, 2014, 2015, 2016.
- Holds the record for most seasons (3) earning US$9,000,000 or more. In 2013, 2014, 2015.
- Holds the record for most seasons (2) earning US$10,000,000 or more. In 2013 and 2015.
- She stands as the highest earning female athlete of all time in terms of prize money across all sports, with $94,816,730 (as of 6 Feb 2023) and is about $52,000,000 & $54,000,000 ahead of the 2nd and 3rd highest women, Venus Williams and Simona Halep, respectively.
- As of 12 July 2021, Williams has the 4th highest career earnings, $94,518,971, of any tennis player, male or female. She trails Novak Djokovic ($151,876,636), Roger Federer ($130,594,339), and Rafael Nadal ($124,937,195 ).
- First athlete ever to place on Forbes’ list of richest self-made women in America.

=== Olympic Games ===
- In 2012, after winning the singles and doubles gold in the Olympics, became the most decorated tennis player in the Olympics with a record of 4 gold medals shared with sister, Venus. (Venus would go on to win a 5th Olympic medal, a silver, in the mixed doubles event).
- At the 2012 Olympics in London, Serena Williams won gold medals in singles and doubles, joining sister Venus Williams (2000 Sydney) and Helen Wills (1924 Paris) as the only women to win a gold medal in both singles and doubles in the same year at the Olympics.
- At the 2012 Olympic Games – singles in London, Williams lost the fewest games in history en route to winning the Olympic gold. She lost just 17 games over the course of 6 matches. Of the 12 sets played, 7 of them were either 6–0 or 6–1 and she lost no more than 3 games in any given set.
  - R64 #20 Jelena Jankovic 6–3, 6–1
  - R32 #44 Urszula Radwanska 6–2, 6–3
  - R16 #14 Vera Zvonareva 6–1, 6–0
  - QF #8 Caroline Wozniacki 6–0, 6–3
  - SF #1 Victoria Azarenka 6–1, 6–2
  - F #3 Maria Sharapova 6–0, 6–1
- In 2012, she and sister, Venus, became the first team to win a record 3 doubles golds in the Olympics as a team (won 2000, 2008, 2012).
- Oldest player to hold all Grand Slam titles in singles and the Olympic Gold in singles, simultaneously (Olympics 2012, US Open 2014, Wimbledon 2015).

=== Ranking ===
- Oldest player to reach No.1 ranking at 35 years, 6 months and 29 days on 24 April 2017.
- Oldest player to hold No. 1 ranking at 35 years, 7 months and 5 days as of 1 May 2017.
- Oldest player to win a Grand Slam singles title at 35 years, 4 months and 2 days when she won her 7th Australian Open crown on 28 January 2017.
- At 1997 Ameritech Cup in Chicago, became the lowest ranked player in tennis history (No.304) to defeat two Top-10 players, No. 4 Monica Seles and No. 7 Mary Pierce, in one tournament.
- On 10 June 2002, Serena and Venus Williams became the first sisters to hold the No. 2 and No. 1 spots in the singles rankings, respectively. Serena Williams would supplant Venus Williams for the No. 1 ranking on 8 July 2002 and they would remain at No. 1 and No. 2 in the rankings until Venus fell to No. 3 on 14 April 2003.
- On 7 June 2010, became the 6th player to hold the No. 1 ranking in both singles and doubles, simultaneously.
- In 2010, after winning the 2010 Roland Garros doubles title, they became the co-world No. 1 players in women's doubles.
- On 21 June 2010, Serena and Venus Williams again occupied the No. 1 and No. 2 spots in the singles rankings, respectively. This came almost exactly 8 years after first accomplishing this feat. At the time, Williams was three months shy of her 29th birthday and Venus had just celebrated her 30th birthday, both ages at which many of their peers had retired.
- At 2007 Miami Open became lowest ranked player (No. 18) to defeat the Top-2 players in the world in the same tournament by defeating No. 1 Henin & No. 2 Sharapova
- Longest winning streak against No. 1 player (years): 4 (shared with Davenport, Graf and Venus Williams).
- Second longest-ever gap between stints at No. 1, five years, one month (August 10, 2003 to September 8, 2008). (surpassed by Caroline Wozniacki’s 6-year gap; January 29, 2012 to January 29, 2018)
- During the 2002 Miami Open, became the second player, after Steffi Graf, in the Open Era to defeat the No. 1 (Jennifer Capriati), No. 2 (Venus Williams), and No. 3 (Martina Hingis) ranked players at the same tournament. Her sister, Venus Williams would become the third, and last, to accomplish this feat at the 2008 WTA Tour Championships with one of those wins being over Serena.
- Defeated the world No. 1 and world No. 2 at the same tournament 8 times in her career, the most of any woman in WTA rankings history.
- On 13 July 2015, became the 1st player to have more than twice as many points as anyone else on the WTA rankings.
- Held the No. 1 ranking for 186 consecutive weeks (13 February 2013 – 11 September 2016), which is tied for first place all-time (with Steffi Graf).
- On 24 April 2017, Serena ascended to the No. 1 ranking for the 8th time. Chris Evert and Martina Navratilova have held the No. 1 ranking on a record 9 different occasions.
- As of 3 July 2017, Serena has held the No. 1 ranking for a total of 319 weeks, which is the third best all-time. (Steffi Graf holds the record with 377 weeks and Martina Navratilova sits in second place with 332 weeks).
- Serena holds the record for the longest time between first ascending to No. 1 (8 July 2002) and last holding the No. 1 position (14 May 2017), 14 years, 10 months and 6 days. (Second longest was Chris Evert, 10 years 21 days)

=== Other ===
- At the 1998 Miami event, became the fastest woman in tennis history to record 5 top-10 wins (in only 16 matches) by defeating Irina Spîrlea in 2nd Round.
- At the 1999 Open Gaz de France in Paris, marking the first time in tennis history that sisters won titles in the same week (Venus Williams won Oklahoma City)
- At the 1999 Indian Wells event, she became the second non-seeded player to win a Tier I event when she beat Steffi Graf in the final.
- At the 1999 Miami event, Serena and Venus became the first pair of sisters in the Open Era to meet in a tournament final with Venus the eventual victor.
- At the 2001 WTA Tour Championships, Serena became the first player in tennis history to win the Season-Ending Championships on her debut.
- In 2012, Serena became the first player in history, male or female, to win singles titles at (1) a Grand Slam event, (2) a Premier Mandatory event, (3) the Olympics [gold medal], and (4) the WTA Championships in the same season. (In 2016, Andy Murray joined Serena as the only two players in history to accomplish this feat.)
- Only player, male or female, to ever accomplish a Career Golden Slam in singles and doubles [Singles: US Open 1999, Roland Garros 2002, Wimbledon 2002, Australian Open 2003, Olympic gold 2012. Doubles: Roland Garros 1999, US Open 1999, Wimbledon 2000, Australian Open 2001, Olympic gold 2000].
- 24 March 2015, Serena won a record 8th Miami Masters title from her record 10th appearance in a Miami final. No male or female has more than 6 Miami Masters singles titles (Andre Agassi & Novak Djokovic each own 6 titles).
- Since the turn of the millennium, Serena and her sister, Venus Williams have dominated the Wimbledon singles title. They won 12 Wimbledon singles crowns in 17 editions of the tournament with Venus winning in 2000 & 2001, Serena winning 2002 & 2003, Venus won in 2005, 2007, and 2008, with Serena winning in 2009, 2010, 2012, 2015, and 2016. Additionally, they have partnered to win the 2000, 2002, 2008, 2009, 2012, and 2016 women's doubles titles.
- Since returning in 2011, from a medical break, Serena made at least 1 Grand Slam final in 9 consecutive years (2011–2019) and won at least 1 Grand Slam title in 6 consecutive years (2012–2017). In two of those years, 2012 & 2013, she won 2 Grand Slam titles, while in 2015 she won 3 Grand Slam titles.
- In 2020, Serena became the first player in the Open era (male or female) to win a singles title in 4 different decades after winning the 2020 Auckland Open.

== Awards ==
1998

- WTA Newcomer of the Year
- Tennis Magazine/Rolex Rookie of the Year

1999

- WTA Most Improved Player of the Year
- Tennis Magazine Player of the Year

2000

- WTA Doubles Team of the Year (with Venus Williams)
- Teen Choice Awards – Extraordinary Achievement Award
- Forbes The Celebrity 100 (No.68)
- Women's Sports Foundation Sportswoman of the Year for team sports (with Venus Williams)

2001

- Forbes The Celebrity 100 (No.71)
- BET Award for Sportswoman of the Year

2002

- WTA Player of the Year
- ITF Women's Singles World Champion
- Forbes The Celebrity 100 (No.72)
- Gazzetta dello Sport Sportswoman of the Year
- United States Sports Academy Female Athlete of the Year
- BET Award for Female Athlete of the Year

2003

- 34th NAACP Image Awards President's Award
- Best Female Athlete ESPY Award
- Best Female Tennis Player ESPY Award
- Laureus World Sportswoman of the Year
- Avon Foundation Celebrity Role Model Award
- BET Award for Female Athlete of the Year
- Forbes The Celebrity 100 (No.60)

2004

- WTA Comeback Player of the Year
- Family Circle/Prudential Financial Player Who Makes a Difference Award
- Best Female Tennis Player ESPY Award
- BET Award for Female Athlete of the Year
- Forbes The Celebrity 100 (No.63)
- Harris Poll Top 10 Favorite Female Sports Star (No.2)
- Teen Choice Awards – Female Athlete Award
- Glamour Magazine Sportswoman of the Year

2005

- BET Award for Female Athlete of the Year
- Forbes The Celebrity 100 (No.62)
- Harris Poll Top 10 Favorite Female Sports Star (No.2)
- Dirty Awards – Best Sports Athlete Female

2006

- Forbes The Celebrity 100 (No.87)
- Harris Poll Top 10 Favorite Female Sports Star (No.2)

2007

- BET Award for Female Athlete of the Year
- Laureus World Comeback of the Year
- Harris Poll Top 10 Favorite Female Sports Star (No.1)
- Forbes The Celebrity 100 (No.69)

2008

- WTA Player of the Year
- Forbes The Celebrity 100 (No.69)
- Harris Poll Top 10 Favorite Female Sports Star (No.2)

2009

- Associated Press Female Athlete of the Year
- SI.com Best Female Athlete of the Decade
- Glamour Magazine Women of the Year Award
- BET Award for Female Athlete of the Year
- Harris Poll Top 10 Favorite Female Sports Star (No.1)
- Best Female Tennis Player ESPY Award
- ITF Women's Singles World Champion
- ITF Women's Doubles World Champion (with Venus Williams)
- ESPN Second Best Tennis Player of the Decade (with Roger Federer at No.1)
- WTA Player of the Year
- WTA Doubles Team of the Year (with Venus Williams)
- WTA Fan Favorite Doubles Team of the Year (with Venus Williams)
- Doha 21st Century Leaders Awards – Outstanding Leadership
- Forbes The Celebrity 100 (No.67)

2010

- Laureus World Sportswoman of the Year
- TIME The World's 100 Most Influential People
- Forbes The Celebrity 100 (No.61)
- BET Award for Female Athlete of the Year
- Best Female Tennis Player ESPY Award
- Harris Poll Top 10 Favorite Female Sports Star (No.1)
- WTA Fan Favorite Doubles Team of the Year (with Venus Williams)
- Forbes 30 Utterly Inspiring Role Models
- Teen Choice Awards – Female Athlete Award
- Forbes 100 Most Powerful Women in the World (No.55)

2011

- BET Award for Female Athlete of the Year
- Forbes The Celebrity 100 (No.84)
- TIME 30 Legends of Women's Tennis
- Best Female Tennis Player ESPY Award
- US Open Series Champion
- Forbes Most Powerful Black Women in the U.S. (No.10)
- The Root 100 2011: Influencers and Iconoclasts (No.41)
- Harris Poll Top 10 Favorite Female Sports Star (No.1)

2012

- Forbes The Celebrity 100 (No.77)
- BET Award for Sportswoman of the Year
- WTA Player of the Year
- WTA Fan Favorite Doubles Team of the Year (with Venus Williams)
- ITF Women's Singles World Champion
- L'Équipe Champion of Champions
- United States Sports Academy Female Athletes of the Year Award
- Teen Choice Awards – Female Athlete Award
- International Sports Press Association (AIPS) Best Female Athlete

2013

- Associated Press Female Athlete of the Year
- Grands Prix de l'Academie des Sports
- Forbes The Celebrity 100 (No.56)
- Best Female Athlete ESPY Award
- Best Female Tennis Player ESPY Award
- Harris Poll Top 10 Favorite Female Sports Star (No.1)
- US Open Series Champion
- WTA Player of the Year
- ITF Women's Singles World Champion
- L'Équipe Champion of Champions
- espnW Impact 10 (No.1)
- International Sports Press Association (AIPS) Best Female Athlete
- Gazzetta dello Sport Sportswoman of the Year

2014

- BET Sportswoman of the Year
- TIME 100 Most Influential People
- Forbes The Celebrity 100 (No.69)
- Teen Choice Awards – Female Athlete Award
- US Open Series Champion
- Harris Poll Top 10 Favorite Female Sports Star (No.1)
- WTA Player of the Year
- ESPN Tennis WTA Player of the Year
- ITF Women's Singles World Champion
- International Sports Press Association (AIPS) Best Female Athlete

2015

- Associated Press Female Athlete of the Year
- BET Sportswoman of the Year
- Best Female Tennis Player ESPY Award
- ESPN Tennis WTA Player of the Year
- Woman's Sports Foundation Sportswoman of the Year
- Harris Poll Top 10 Favorite Female Sports Star (No.1)
- Harris Poll Top 10 Athletes of All-Time (No.4)
- Harris Poll Top 10 Greatest Tennis Player (No.1)
- WTA Player of the Year
- WTA Social Fan Favorite – Post of the Year
- WTA Social Fan Favorite – Aww of the Year
- WTA Social Fan Favorite – Womance of the Year (with Caroline Wozniacki)
- ITF Women's Singles World Champion
- Sports Illustrated Sportsperson of the Year
- United States Sports Academy Female Athlete of the Year
- L'Équipe Champion of Champions
- International Sports Press Association (AIPS) Best Female Athlete
- Nickelodeon Kid's Choice Awards- Queen of Swag

2016

- Laureus World Sportswoman of the Year
- BET Sportswoman of the Year
- Best Female Tennis Player ESPY Award
- Sports Illustrated Fashionable 50 Athletes (No.4)
- WTA Best Dressed of the Year (Wimbledon)
- Nielsen Most Marketable Athletes in the U.S. (No.4)

2017

- BET Sportswoman of the Year
- Best Female Tennis Player ESPY Award
- Nielsen Most Marketable Athletes in the U.S. (No.1)
- International Sports Press Association (AIPS) Best Female Athlete
- Sports Illustrated Fashionable 50 Athletes (No.3)

2018

- Laureus World Sportswoman of the Year
- Associated Press Female Athlete of the Year
- People's Choice Game Changer Award
- Teen Choice Awards – Female Athlete Award
- Sports Illustrated Fashionable 50 Athletes

2019

- Best Female Tennis Player ESPY Award
- Sports Illustrated Fashionable 50
- The Independent's Women of the Decade
- Tennis Magazine The Women's Player of the Decade
- Sky Sports Sportsperson of the Decade
- Associated Press Female Athlete of the Decade
- Teen Choice Awards – Female Athlete Award
- Forbes 100 Most Powerful Women in the World (No.55)
- Forbes America's Richest Self-Made Women (No.80)
- Sports Illustrated Fashionable 50 Athletes (No.1)

2020

- Forbes America's Richest Self-Made Women (No.83)
- TIME 100 Most Influential Women of the Past Century

2021

- Forbes 100 Most Powerful Women in the World (No.85)
- Forbes America's Richest Self-Made Women (No.98)

2022

- People's Choice Game Changer Award
- Elle 100 Women - Game Changer
- Eurosport Best Comeback Player
- Press Association (AIPS) - one of the top 10 athletes of the year
- Forbes America's Richest Self-Made Women (No.90)
- SportsPro 50 Most Marketable Athletes (No.1 female athlete)

2023

- NAACP Image Award – Jackie Robinson Sports Award

2024

- Inducted into the National Women’s Hall of Fame
- Nickelodeon Kids' Choice Awards – Legend Award

2025

- Princess of Asturias Awards
- Inducted into the United States Olympic & Paralympic Hall of Fame
- Baby2Baby Gala – Giving Tree Award For Maternal Health Work

== Recognition ==
See also : Serena Williams Legacy

In 2005, Tennis Magazine ranked her as the 17th-best player in 40 years.

In June 2011, she was named one of the "30 Legends of Women's Tennis: Past, Present and Future" by Time. In 2014 she was named one of ESPNW's Impact 25.

In 2020, the Tennis Channel ranked Williams as the greatest woman tennis player of all time.

== See also ==
- List of Open Era tennis records
- WTA Tour
- WTA Awards

Sporting positions
Preceded by Venus Williams; Angelique Kerber	World No. 1 First stint: July 8, 2002 – August 10, 2003; Last stint: April 24, 2017 – May 14, 2017	Succeeded by Kim Clijsters; Angelique Kerber
Preceded by Jennifer Capriati; Justine Henin; Petra Kvitová	Year-end World No. 1; 2002; 2008, 2009; 2012 – 2015	Succeeded by Justine Henin; Kim Clijsters; Angelique Kerber
Awards
Preceded by Jennifer Capriati; Jelena Janković; Petra Kvitová	ITF Women's Singles World Champion; 2002; 2009; 2012 – 2015	Succeeded by Justine Henin; Caroline Wozniacki; Angelique Kerber
Preceded by Martina Hingis & Anna Kournikova; Cara Black & Liezel Huber	WTA Doubles Team of the Year; 2000 (with Venus Williams); 2009 (with Venus Williams)	Succeeded by Lisa Raymond & Rennae Stubbs; Gisela Dulko & Flavia Pennetta
Preceded by Cara Black & Liezel Huber	ITF Women's Doubles World Champion; 2009 (with Venus Williams)	Succeeded by Gisela Dulko & Flavia Pennetta
