= Clarita de Quiroz =

Scottish singer–songwriter and model

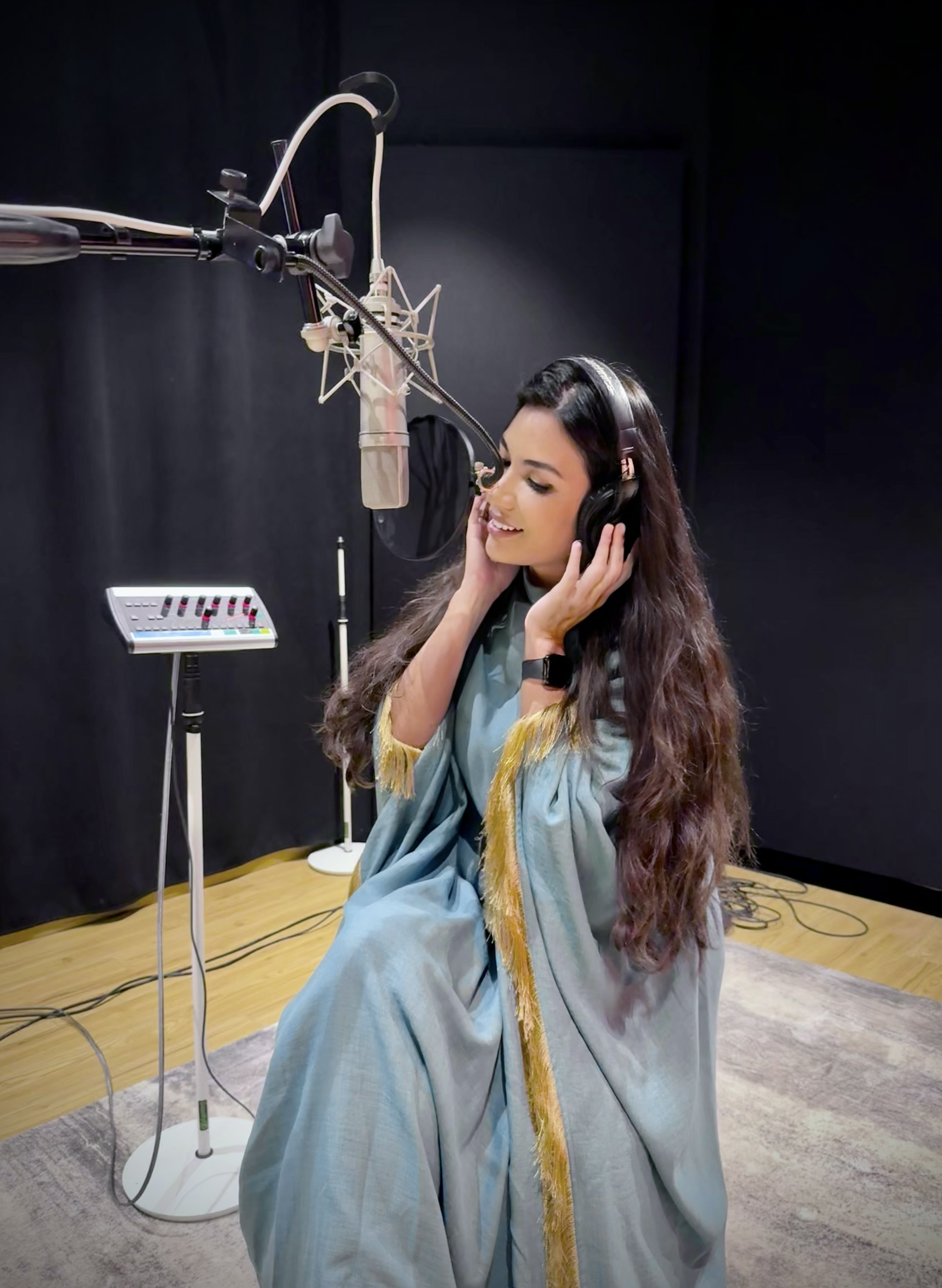

Background information
- Born: 3 August 1987 (age 39); Abu Dhabi, United Arab Emirates
- Origin: Dorset, England and Edzell, Angus, Scotland
- Genres: Pop, Piano Acoustic, classical crossover
- Occupations: Pianist, singer, composer, academic, spokesperson
- Instruments: Piano, xylophone, vibraphone, vocals
- Years active: 2006–present
- Website: claritadequiroz.com

Claire O'Neill (born 3 August 1987), better known as Clarita de Quiroz, is a Scottish singer–songwriter and model from Edzell, Angus, Scotland. De Quiroz is a classically trained pianist and percussionist, who was named "Young Musician of the Year" in 1998 in North East Scotland. She is also known for supporting Sir Elton John in Abu Dhabi during 2012. De Quiroz is now based in the UAE and is a chart topping recording artist with reputable credentials.

De Quiroz is a triple number 1 album holder in the UAE. De Quiroz filmed for the first motion picture in Dubai, City of Life.

== Career ==
=== Modelling ===
De Quiroz was signed to numerous agencies. She was first signed with Scotland's The Look Agency (now The Look at Colours Agency). Her Dubai agency is Bareface for modelling.

Clarita became the face of Val Saint Lambert in October 2009 and shot for the new campaign in Belgium.

De Quiroz was a packaging model for Ultimo lingerie alongside Lois Weatherup, a former Miss Scotland. She has modelled for companies such as La Senza, Boudich Lingerie, La Sirenne Channel 4 Stacked, ICS learning commercial, front page model and editorial model for Illustrado Magazine La Femme Fatale Lingerie, Wella Hair at Salon International 2007, MTV, and appeared on numerous front page covers of magazines and editorials/commercials.

=== Music ===
De Quiroz is a classically trained pianist and percussionist, who was named north-east Scotland's "Young Musician of the Year" in 1998.

Clarita supported Sir Elton John at his Abu Dhabi Yas Arena performance in March 2012 as well as won the GR8! Women Awards 2012 for Best Singer in the Middle East.

Clarita performed at the Formula 1 Abu Dhabi 2011 just after her performance alongside Macy Gray in Doha for the Doha 21st Century Leaders Awards 2011 in October. Clarita de Quiroz also performed at the 2010 Formula 1 supporting Kelly Rowland, Gabrielle and the Sugababes.

De Quiroz was elected one of the UAE's Hot 100 for Ahlan Magazine UAE, where she performed during the night before Jermaine Jackson and accompanied Sheila Ferguson from Three Degrees on the piano.

De Quiroz completed her "Grade 8 Piano" at the age of 16 and her "Grade 8 Percussion" at 15 at the Associated Board of the Royal Schools of Music. De Quiroz composed her first concerto Inamorato at the age of 15 during her lunch time breaks during school. She started her vocal training at the age of 13.

She has performed regularly for the Royal families in the UAE, Saudi and Doha. She is a favorite to perform at the Abu Dhabi Formula 1

De Quiroz has achieved three number-one albums across different genres. Her debut album, SickAsSwans, a collaboration with producer Dion Mavath, topped charts in 2012 with its blend of pop and electronic sounds. Her second album, Speak.Delete.Repeat, released under Sony Music, showcased her range as a singer-songwriter. Most recently, her first classical instrumental album reached number one in the UAE on 6 December 2024, highlighting her talents as a classically trained pianist.

Her previous performances in Dubai have included the Grazia Style Awards 2009, Time Out Awards and Esquire Magazine Launch 2009, Arabian Business Awards and Emirates Woman of the Year Awards 2009. In October 2009 Clarita performed in front of the Qatar Al Thani Royal Family for the Doha 21st Century Leaders Awards 2009.

=== Business ===
Clarita in 2024, founded Elite Villa Management in Koh Samui Thailand after selling KGS Management to create Villa Nirvana Boutique Hotel.

She won the award with Khatoonpreneur Top 50 Female Entrepreneurs, awarded by His Highness Sheikh Rashid bin Nasser Al Nuaimi and His Highness Sheikh Zayed Bin Jamal Al in November 2024.

She was the Managing Director of Groove Master Entertainment from 2013 until 2018 in Dubai

=== Presenting ===
De Quiroz started shooting for City 7 TV's Dubai Dine TV and Dubai Night's TV shows in June 2010.

== Personal life ==
De Quiroz was born in Scotland to Filipino-Spanish and Dutch-Irish parents. She completed her Masters of Law LL.M Laws with the University of Sunderland in December 2024. She is now currently completing her Doctorate with the Swiss School of Management in Dubai.

Since 2022, Clarita de Quiroz has chosen to abstain from alcohol, citing personal, health, and wellness reasons as the foundation for this life-changing decision. She credits this shift in lifestyle as the driving force behind her creative and professional resurgence, referring to it as a "rebirth" in both music and education. With a clear mind and renewed focus, she believes this transformation has allowed her to connect more deeply with her artistry and pursue her passion for lifelong learning.

De Quiroz was one of the six Women of Substance 2009 for the UAE for Illustrado
