= Lady Raven (album) =

2024 album by Saleka

Studio album / soundtrack album by Saleka
- Released: August 2, 2024
- Recorded: 2024
- Genre: Pop
- Length: 44:43
- Label: Columbia

Saleka chronology
Seance (2023)	Lady Raven (2024)

Singles from Lady Raven
- 1. "Release" Released: June 7, 2024; 2. "Save Me" Released: July 12, 2024; 3. "Divine" Released: July 26, 2024

Lady Raven (Note: also known as Lady Raven (Original Music from the Motion Picture Trap)) is the second studio album by Saleka which also acts as the soundtrack to the 2024 film Trap directed by her father M. Night Shyamalan, in which she plays the eponymous titular character performing 14 songs from the album as heard in the film. The soundtrack was released in conjunction with the film, on August 2, 2024, through Columbia Records.

Saleka and Shyamalan both cited the 1984 musical film Purple Rain as a favourite, and inspired by that film, Shyamalan aimed to curate a soundtrack in which "the buoyancy and the artistry of the music is affecting the movie in a significant way". The songs are performed within the story, as part of Lady Raven’s concert, where most of the film takes place.

The album features performances from rapper-singers Kid Cudi, Russ and singer Amaarae, the former two also feature in the film. The singles "Release", "Save Me" and "Divine" led the album prior to its release.

== Background ==
Trap was developed from the conversations with Shyamalan and Saleka about a musical-driven film that combines concert and theatrical experience and also thought devising an album for a narrative, similar to how Prince wrote the titular album for his musical film Purple Rain (1984) which the duo cited it as their favorite. She recalled on how being instrumental to bring music and film together, citing Bollywood films where music acts as a pivotal role in the storytelling.

After discussing multiple possibilities, Shyamalan thought of a story idea where a serial killer arrives at a concert and learns that the concert is a trap, which propelled him to develop the film. Saleka also helped in pitching ideas for Shyamalan to develop the soundscape that would help in defining the film's first half that would set the right tone.

The film would also become Saleka's acting debut where she would star as Lady Raven whose concert the characters attend. The title was selected among multiple names which were considered for the singer's character, as raven was symbolised to be "dark but beautiful, and also strong and majestic". This resulted in her sound being pop and edgy, adding that "She’s an artist who wants to teach her audience and the girls that follow her the strength to believe in who you are and not to be afraid, to go for things."

== Production and composition ==
Trap is also Saleka's third collaboration with her father, after previously writing a single for the film Old (2021) and an EP for the series' Servant (2019–2023). She wrote and composed 14 songs for the film, as her father was writing the script, so that they are designed diegetically to match the action onscreen. She considered the music to be an amplification of the story, where the first few songs in the film were not as much dark, but as the story progresses to become more intense the songs get darker, and "the energy and the rhythms and the production style [sets, dancing and costumes] kind of ramps up as the concert's going until the very end".

She wanted the album to be designed for the show's setting and the things that are happening with its dark tonalities and lyrical concepts were integrated into the storyline and curated for that. The album is influenced by numerous genres—rhythm and blues, jazz, Bollywood and Latin music—where she brought those textures into the pop music structure which was the main goal.

While composer Herdís Stefánsdóttir independently scored the film from Saleka's songs, she used few of the original songs in her cues while composing. But the score was much separate from the soundtrack album.

== Release ==
Lady Raven was released on the same day as the film, August 2, 2024, through the Columbia Records label. The 14-song album, which besides having Saleka performing all the songs, featured contributions from rapper-songwriter and producer Russ and Ghanaian singer Amaarae, as well as rapper Kid Cudi who was the featured artist in the album. Both Cudi and Russ also star in the film.

=== Singles ===
The first single from the album was the ballad number "Release" on June 7, 2024. It was an important song in the film, as it showcased the character's backstory and her emotional depth. She wanted the album to be started with a more stripped-down song that showcased the raw side of the character and herself in terms of songwriting, which mostly consisted of vocals supplemented with piano and strings. She described the lyrics being much important to the character, as "it feels like this very vulnerable moment before we get into more of the pop bangers that are super fun". After that song, Saleka wanted to release the pop numbers from the album but wanted to showcase its integrity in the first place.

"Save Me" was released as the second single from the album on July 12. The third song "Divine" that featured Cudi was released on July 26. The song was the last to be shot as a part of the in-film concert. She found performing the song with Cudi as a fun and surreal experience.

== Reception ==
Chris Deville of The Ringer called the album to be a step above over Saleka's previous musical contributions, but found that "[they] don’t truly pop, and they feel slightly out of step with what’s happening in music right now—less like the stylized 2000s nostalgia that prevails and more like actual 2000s radio filler." Owen Gleiberman of Variety wrote "[Saleka's] songs are pulsating and catchy". Lovia Gyarkye of The Hollywood Reporter wrote that Saleka's album "adds a haunting layer to composer Herdis Stefansdottir’s score".

== Track listing ==
All tracks are written by Saleka (as Lady Raven).

No.	Title	Artist(s)	Length
1.	"Don't Wanna Be Yours"	Saleka (as Lady Raven)	3:03
2.	"Save Me"	Saleka	2:48
3.	"Placebo"	Saleka	4:01
4.	"Care for You"	Saleka	3:10
5.	"Release"	Saleka	3:19
6.	"Liar"	Saleka	3:09
7.	"Hiding"	Saleka and Russ	3:29
8.	"Empathize"	Saleka	3:00
9.	"Love You"	Saleka	3:20
10.	"Dead End"	Saleka	3:06
11.	"Dreamer Girl"	Saleka	2:53
12.	"Divine"	Saleka feat. Kid Cudi	3:35
13.	"Where Did She Go"	Saleka	3:07
14.	"Pieces"	Saleka and Amaarae	2:43
Total length:			44:43
