= James Madigan =

Film director

James Madigan is a film director, second unit director and film VFX special effect specialist. He is known for the 2025 action comedy Fight or Flight, starring Josh Hartnett and Medal of Honor. Madigan has worked in visual effects on films like The Divergent Series: Insurgent, Iron Man 2 and as second unit director for The Meg and Transformers: Rise of the Beasts.
