= Kill It and Leave This Town =

- Film poster
- Directed by: Mariusz Wilczyński
- Written by: Mariusz Wilczyński
- Produced by: Ewa Puszczyńska; Agnieszka Ścibior
- Starring: Krystyna Janda; Andrzej Wajda; Marek Kondrat; Daniel Olbrychski
- Edited by: Jarosław Barzan
- Music by: Tadeusz Nalepa
- Production company: Bombonierka
- Distributed by: Outsider Pictures
- Release dates: 22 February 2020 (Berlin); 27 November 2020
- Running time: 88 minutes
- Country: Poland
- Language: Polish
- Box office: $183,771

Kill It and Leave This Town (Polish: Zabij to i wyjedź z tego miasta) is a 2020 Polish adult animated psychological horror film directed by Polish animator Mariusz Wilczyński, in his feature film debut, from a script developed alongside Agnieszka Ścibior.

The film concerns a hero, fleeing from despair after losing those dearest to him, who hides in a safe land of memories, where time stands still and all those dear to him are alive.

== Voice cast ==
- Krystyna Janda as Janek's mother
- Andrzej Chyra as Janek's father
- Maja Ostaszewska as Janek
- Barbara Krafftówna as Mariusz's mother (old)
- Anna Dymna as Mariusz's mother (young)
- Gustaw Holoubek as Mariusz's alter ego

== Production ==
The film took fourteen years to animate. Wilczyński had originally intended Kill It and Leave This Town to be a short film, however eventually ended up deciding to make it his feature debut. The film was made for Wilczyński to symbolically say goodbye to his family who had died. At the film's premiere at the 70th Berlin International Film Festival, Wilczyński said "In a short time, people who were important to me passed away. I did not have time to say goodbye to them, I do it with my animation." He also added; "I don't believe in death, they didn't die, but they live in my imagination."

== Release ==
The film premiered at the 70th Berlin International Film Festival on 22 February 2020, and was delayed from theatrical releases due to the impact of the COVID-19 pandemic on cinema. It was released in theatres in Poland on 5 March 2021, and grossed $183,771.

The film received generally positive reviews from critics, and received several accolades. Kill It and Leave This Town has an approval rating of 93% on review aggregator website Rotten Tomatoes, based on 14 reviews, and an average rating of 7.6/10. On Metacritic, the film has a score of 69 out of 100 based on 8 critics, indicating "generally favorable reviews".

=== Accolades ===
Award	Category	Recipient	Result	Ref(s)
Ottawa International Animation Festival	Best Feature	Mariusz Wilczyński	Won	
Polish Film Festival	Golden Lions Awards	Mariusz Wilczyński	Won	
Polish Film Awards	Best Film	Mariusz Wilczyński	Won	
Polish Film Awards	Best Director	Mariusz Wilczyński	Nominated	
Polish Film Awards	Best Screenplay	Mariusz Wilczyński	Won	
Polish Film Awards	Best Production Design	Mariusz Wilczyński	Nominated	
Polish Film Awards	Best Film Score	Tadeusz Nalepa	Won	
Polish Film Awards	Best Sound	Franciszek Kozłowski	Won	
Polish Film Awards	Discovery of the Year	Mariusz Wilczyński	Nominated	
Polish Film Awards	Discovery of the Year	Mariusz Wilczyński	Nominated	
Viennale	Fipresci Prize	Mariusz Wilczyński	Won	
Monstra Festival	Grande Prémio Monstra	Mariusz Wilczyński	Won	
