= Ariel Donoghue =

Australian actress (born 2010)

- Born: 10 March 2010 (age 16); Australia
- Occupation: Actress
- Years active: 2014–present

Ariel Joy Donoghue (born 10 March 2010) is an Australian actress who is best known for her work in Blueback, Wolf Like Me, and Trap.

== Career ==
Donoghue was born and raised in Australia. Donoghue made her feature film debut in the 2022 film Blueback. Donoghue's next big role came in the 2024 film Trap where she starred in the movie as Riley Abbott. On June 23, 2024, Donoghue was nominated for a Silver Logie Award for Most Outstanding Supporting Actress in her role in Wolf Like Me.

== Filmography ==
=== Television ===
Year	Title	Role	Notes
2017	High Life	Millie	1 episode
2022–2023	High Life	Millie	1 episode
2023	Wolf Like Me	Emma	13 episodes

=== Film ===
Year	Title	Role	Notes
2014	The Comedian	Casey	Short film
2019	Crossing Paths	Kelsie	Short film
2020	New Computer	Female Anchor	Short film
2021	Tough	Emma	Short film
2022	By Lucas Wilson	Harriet	Short film
2022	Blueback	Young Abby	
2024	Trap	Riley Abbott	

== Awards and nominations ==
Year	Award	Work	Category	Result	Ref.
2024	Logie Awards	Wolf Like Me	Most Outstanding Supporting Actress	Nominated	
