= Valley of the Gods (film) =

Film directed by Lech Majewski

- Directed by: Lech Majewski
- Written by: Lech Majewski
- Produced by: Lech Majewski; Filip Jan Rymsza
- Starring: Josh Hartnett; Bérénice Marlohe; John Rhys-Davies; John Malkovich
- Cinematography: Lech Majewski; Pawel Tybora
- Edited by: Eliot Ems; Norbert Rudzik
- Music by: Jan A. P. Kaczmarek
- Release date: 17 September 2019 (Gdynia)
- Running time: 131 minutes
- Countries: Poland; Luxembourg
- Language: English
- Budget: €3.8 million
- Box office: $42,757

Valley of the Gods is a 2019 English-language Polish-Luxembourger drama film written and directed by Lech Majewski and starring Josh Hartnett and John Malkovich.

== Plot ==
John Ecas arrives at the Valley of the Gods, in SE Utah near Monument Valley, where the spirits of Navajo deities dwell within enormous stones. He is a copywriter whose life collapsed when his wife left him. As a cure, his therapist suggested he do crazy things. Having done so, he decided to write The Great American Novel. The film visualizes what he writes.

Enter Wes Tauros, the world's richest man, gone mute after a tragedy. He wants to mine the Valley of the Gods for uranium. The Navajos split between those who want the money and those upset at the desecration of holy ground. Ecas turns up at Tauros' estate in order to write his biography but, once there, he finds peculiar things.

There are intertwining threads centered on Tauros, Ecas, the Navajos, and The Old Gods. The storyline brims with admiration for the Navajos, and utter disdain for both the vulgar avarice of Tauros and the all-consuming consumerism of society at large.

== Cast ==
- Josh Hartnett as John Ecas
- Bérénice Marlohe as Karen Kitson
- John Malkovich as Wes Tauros
- John Rhys-Davies as Dr. Hermann
- Jaime Ray Newman as Laura Ecas
- Keir Dullea as Ulim
