= Josh Hartnett =

American actor (born 1978)

- Hartnett in 2026
- Born: Joshua Daniel Hartnett; July 21, 1978 (age 48); Saint Paul, Minnesota, U.S.
- Occupation: Actor
- Years active: 1997–present
- Spouse: Tamsin Egerton (m. 2021)
- Children: 4

Joshua Daniel Hartnett (born July 21, 1978) is an American actor. He began his career on ABC's drama series Cracker (1997–1998), after which he became known as a teen idol through starring parts in films such as Halloween H20: 20 Years Later, The Faculty (both 1998), The Virgin Suicides (1999), Pearl Harbor, O, Black Hawk Down (all 2001), and 40 Days and 40 Nights (2002).

Hartnett continued to work steadily throughout the 2000s, with a mix of leading and supporting roles in Hollywood Homicide (2003), Wicker Park (2004), Sin City (2005), The Black Dahlia, Lucky Number Slevin (both 2006), 30 Days of Night (2007), August (2008), and I Come with the Rain (2009). He experienced a career resurgence with his roles as Ernest Lawrence in Oppenheimer (2023), a serial killer in Trap (2024), a mercenary in Fight or Flight (2025), and a family husband in Verity (2026).

On television, Hartnett portrayed Ethan Chandler on the Showtime fantasy series Penny Dreadful (2014–2016). He also appeared in an episode of Black Mirror (2023) and guest-starred in The Bear (2024–2026).

== Early life and education ==
Joshua Daniel Hartnett was born on July 21, 1978, in Saint Paul, Minnesota, the eldest child of Daniel Thomas Hartnett and Wendy Anne (née Kronstedt). He was raised by his father, a building manager and former guitarist for Al Green, and his stepmother, Molly, an artist. He has three younger siblings. Hartnett was raised Catholic, attending Nativity of Our Lord Catholic School. At Minneapolis South High School, he played football, but a knee injury forced him off the team when he was 16. He tried youth theater, acting in productions of The Adventures of Tom Sawyer and Guys and Dolls, and attracted attention from a talent scout. Originally interested in becoming a painter, he decided to pursue film acting while working in a video rental shop, where he became acquainted with films such as Trainspotting, 12 Monkeys, and The Usual Suspects.

After graduating from high school in 1996, Hartnett moved to Purchase, New York to attend the Conservatory of Theatre Arts & Film at the State University of New York at Purchase. He was expelled after writing a letter to the dean arguing that the college's evaluation system stifled students' creativity. At 19, he moved to Los Angeles at the recommendation of his manager, Nancy Kremer, who had previously helped him book television commercials.

== Career ==
Shortly after arriving in Los Angeles, he caught an improbable break, landing a part in the short-lived ABC drama Cracker. His first feature film was Halloween H20: 20 Years Later, in which he played the son of character Laurie Strode. Released on August 5, 1998, it performed well at the box office.

Hartnett developed a successful film career, appearing in The Faculty (1998), The Virgin Suicides (1999), and Black Hawk Down (2001). In 2001, he starred in the war drama Pearl Harbor. He was originally scheduled to play Tino in Deuces Wild but dropped out of the film. He also starred in O, an adaptation of William Shakespeare's Othello set in an American high school, playing Hugo, the film's version of Iago. In 2002, he starred in the romantic comedy 40 Days and 40 Nights.

In the early 2000s, Hartnett was approached several times to play the role of Clark Kent / Superman for a project originally helmed by Brett Ratner but always turned it down, not wanting to commit to a predicted ten-year role. Hartnett said, "It just wasn't the kind of movie I wanted to do. I turned down other superhero roles as well." For Christopher Nolan's Batman Begins, The Dark Knight, and The Dark Knight Rises, Hartnett declined the role of Bruce Wayne, which went to Christian Bale.

Hartnett was chosen as one of Teen People's "21 Hottest Stars Under 21" in 1999, Teen People's "25 Hottest Stars under 25", and one of People's "50 Most Beautiful People" in 2002. He was also voted Bliss magazine's "3rd Sexiest Male". During this period, he was marketed as a teen idol and a potential megastar; his unease with this public image led to his disillusionment with pursuing roles in high‑profile films.

Hartnett's next films included Hollywood Homicide (2003), Wicker Park (2004), Mozart and the Whale (2005), Sin City (2005), and Lucky Number Slevin (2006). He followed these roles with the 2006 drama-mystery The Black Dahlia, in which he played a detective investigating the real-life murder of waitress Elizabeth Short. Hartnett had been cast five years earlier and remained committed to the film because he liked the subject matter.

His 2007 roles included Resurrecting the Champ and the graphic novel-based 30 Days of Night, in which he played a small-town sheriff. Hartnett described the second film as "supernatural, but kind of a western". He was going to play trumpet player Chet Baker in The Prince of Cool but left the project after disagreeing with the producer's ideas.

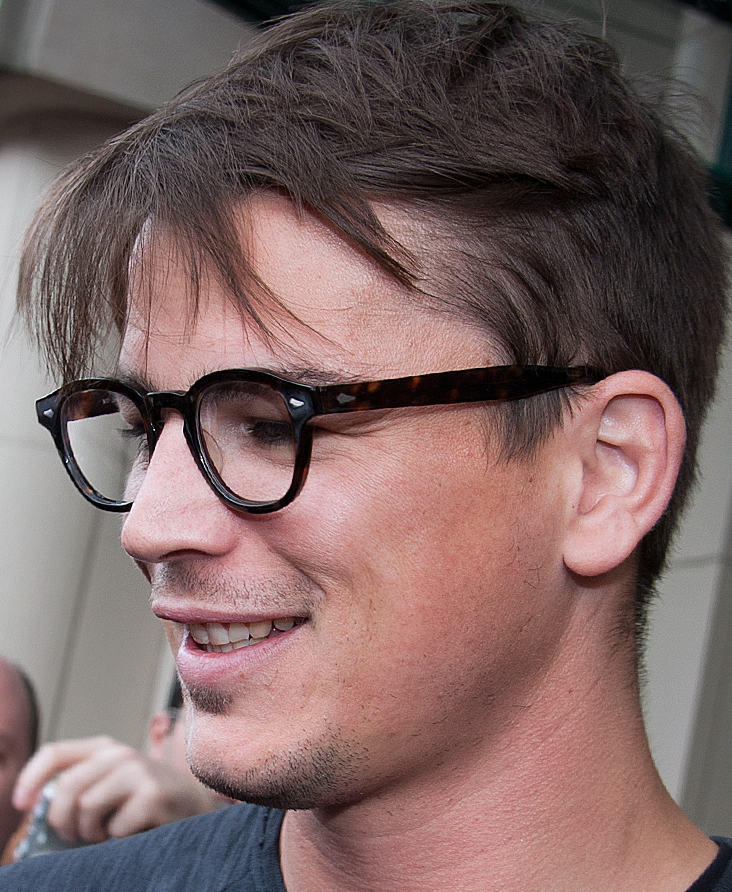
Hartnett in 2011

In 2008, Hartnett played Charlie Babbit in the stage adaptation of Barry Morrow's film Rain Man at the Apollo Theatre in London's West End. He starred in the Emporio Armani fragrance campaign, "Diamonds for Men", becoming the first male celebrity to represent Giorgio Armani Beauty. He has appeared on magazine covers including Cosmogirl, Details, Entertainment Weekly, Girlfriend, Seventeen, Vanity Fair, GQ, and Vman, and in magazines such as Vogue, Elle, People, Glamour, In Touch, and InStyle.

In 2009, Hartnett produced the music video for Kid Cudi's "Pursuit of Happiness". During this period, he acted in several direct-to-DVD and international films that received negative reviews, including August (2008), I Come with the Rain (2009), Bunraku (2010), Girl Walks into a Bar (2011), Stuck Between Stations (2011), The Lovers (2013), Parts per Billion (2014), and Wild Horses (2015). In 2013, he was a guest of honor on Off Plus Camera.

In 2014, he was cast as Ethan Chandler in the Gothic horror series Penny Dreadful, which was filmed in Dublin and other locations in Ireland. His character was later revealed to be Lawrence Talbot / the Wolfman. In 2017, he performed in Atsuko Hirayanagi's independent film Oh Lucy!, which premiered at the Cannes Film Festival. That year, he also starred in and produced the survival film 6 Below: Miracle on the Mountain, which received negative reviews. He continued acting in smaller films that were received negatively, including The Ottoman Lieutenant (2017), She's Missing (2019), Inherit the Viper (2019), Valley of the Gods (2019), and Ida Red (2021).

In 2020, he portrayed Canadian journalist Victor Malarek in the crime drama Target Number One. Hartnett appeared in Guy Ritchie's Wrath of Man (2021) in a supporting role before Ritchie cast him in Operation Fortune: Ruse de Guerre (2023). In January 2022, Hartnett was cast as Ernest Lawrence in Nolan's Oppenheimer (2023). In July 2022, he joined the sixth season of Black Mirror.

In 2024, he starred in M. Night Shyamalan's thriller Trap, playing Cooper Abbott, a serial killer, known as "the Butcher". Between 2024 and 2025, Hartnett played Frank in the third season of The Bear. In December 2024, he joined the cast of Verity, the film adaptation of Colleen Hoover's 2018 novel.

In 2025, Hartnett starred in the action film Fight or Flight, playing a mercenary tracking a target on a plane.

== Personal life ==
Hartnett began a relationship with English actress Tamsin Egerton in 2012. They have four children. The couple married in November 2021. They live in Hampshire, England.

Speaking about fame, Hartnett said: "I know what it's like to be in that whole world. I was up there for a couple of years, and it was uncomfortable. I think trying to stay at the top is a shortcut to unhappiness." He took a 15-month break from acting, saying: "I spent a bit of time really thinking about whether this was the right thing for me."

In September 2025, Hartnett was hospitalized after a car crash in Canada. The vehicle he was in collided with a police patrol car in St. John's, Newfoundland and Labrador.

== Activism ==
Hartnett has been involved in various causes. In 2007, he took time out from filming to support the Global Cool's green lifestyle campaign.

In 2011, Hartnett became one of several celebrities attached to USAID and the Ad Council's FWD campaign, an awareness initiative tied to that year's East Africa drought. He joined Uma Thurman, Chanel Iman, and Geena Davis in TV and Internet ads to "forward the facts" about the crisis.

In 2012, Hartnett joined Barack Obama's campaign in Minnesota, appearing at events such as the Minnesota Greater Together Youth Summit before formally endorsing the President on the campaign's official YouTube channel. He and Minneapolis mayor R. T. Rybak also appeared at the University of Minnesota's McNamara Alumni Center for an Obama question and answer session in April.

== Filmography ==
=== Film ===
Key
†	Denotes films that have not yet been released

Year	Title	Role	Notes
1998	Halloween H20: 20 Years Later	John Tate	
1998	The Faculty	Zeke Tyler	
1999	The Virgin Suicides	Trip Fontaine	
2000	Here on Earth	Jasper Arnold	
2001	Black Hawk Down	SSG Matt Eversmann	
2001	Blow Dry	Brian Allen	
2001	O	Hugo Goulding	
2001	Pearl Harbor	Danny Walker	
2001	Short6	Gianni	Compilation of six cinematic shorts
2001	Town & Country	Tom Stoddard	
2002	40 Days and 40 Nights	Matt Sullivan	
2003	Hollywood Homicide	K. C. Calden	
2003	Zéro Un	The Neighbor	Compilation of ten cinematic shorts produced by Luc Besson
2004	Wicker Park	Matthew Simon	
2005	Mozart and the Whale	Donald Morton	
2005	Sin City	The Salesman / The Lady Killer	
2005	Stories of Lost Souls	The Neighbor	
2006	The Black Dahlia	Dwight "Bucky" Bleichert	
2006	Lucky Number Slevin	Slevin Kelevra	
2007	Resurrecting the Champ	Erik Kernan	
2007	Stories USA	Gianni	
2007	30 Days of Night	Eben Oleson	
2008	August	Tom Sterling	Also producer
2009	I Come with the Rain	Kline	
2010	Bunraku	The Drifter	
2011	Girl Walks into a Bar	Sam Salazar	
2011	Stuck Between Stations	Paddy	
2013	The Lovers	James Stewart / Jay Fennel	
2014	Parts per Billion	Len	
2015	Wild Horses	KC Briggs	
2015	The Long Home	N/A	Unreleased
2017	Oh Lucy!	John Woodruff	
2017	The Ottoman Lieutenant	Jude	
2017	6 Below: Miracle on the Mountain	Eric LeMarque	Also producer
2019	She's Missing	Ren	
2020	Inherit the Viper	Kip Riley	
2020	Target Number One	Victor Malarek	Also known as Most Wanted
2020	Valley of the Gods	John Ecas	
2021	Wrath of Man	Dave "Boy Sweat" Hancock	
2021	Ida Red	Wyatt Walker	
2023	Operation Fortune: Ruse de Guerre	Danny Francesco	
2023	Oppenheimer	Ernest Lawrence	
2024	Trap	Cooper Abbott	
2025	Fight or Flight	Lucas Reyes	
2026	Verity	Jeremy Crawford	
TBA	White Lies †	Jack Freeman	Post-production

=== Television ===
Year	Title	Role	Notes
1997–1998	Cracker	Michael Fitzgerald	Main role
2002	Saturday Night Live	Himself (host)	Episode: "Josh Hartnett/Pink"
2008	T Takes	Josh	Web series
2014–2016	Penny Dreadful	Ethan Chandler / Lawrence Talbot / the Wolfman	Main role
2015; 2019	Drunk History	Clark Gable	Episode: "Miami"
2015; 2019	Drunk History	Joachim Neumann	Episode: "Love"
2020	Die Hart	Josh Hartnett	4 episodes
2020	Paradise Lost	Yates Forsythe	Main role
2021	Exterminate All the Brutes	White Man	Miniseries; main role
2022	The Fear Index	Alexander Hoffmann	Miniseries; main role
2023	Black Mirror	David Ross	Episode: "Beyond the Sea"
2024–2026	The Bear	Frank	3 episodes
2026	Below	Calvin Penney	Miniseries; main role

=== Stage ===
Year	Title	Role	Notes
2008	Rain Man	Charlie Babbitt	Apollo Theatre
2008	The 24 Hour Plays	Main Man	Annual fundraiser at The Old Vic theater involving actors, writers and directors creating and presenting a series of six plays in a day

=== Music videos ===
Year	Title	Artist	Notes
1999	"Playground Love"	Air	The Virgin Suicides soundtrack
2001	"There You'll Be"	Faith Hill	Pearl Harbor soundtrack
2010	"Pursuit of Happiness"	Kid Cudi	Producer

== Awards and nominations ==
Year	Association	Category	Work	Result	Ref.
1999	Blockbuster Entertainment Awards	Favorite Male Newcomer	Halloween H20: 20 Years Later	Nominated	
1999	MTV Movie Awards	Best Breakthrough Male Performance	Halloween H20: 20 Years Later	Nominated	
1999	Saturn Awards	Best Performance by a Younger Actor	The Faculty	Nominated	
2000	Teen Choice Awards	Choice Breakout Star	Here on Earth	Nominated	
2001	Teen Choice Awards	Choice Movie Actor	Pearl Harbor	Nominated	
2002	MTV Movie Awards	Best Male Performance	Pearl Harbor	Nominated	
2002	Razzie Award	Worst Screen Couple (with Ben Affleck)	Pearl Harbor	Nominated	
2002	Phoenix Film Critics Society Award	Best Acting Ensemble (shared with the cast)	Black Hawk Down	Nominated	
2002	Teen Choice Awards	Choice Action Movie Actor	Black Hawk Down	Nominated	
2002	Teen Choice Awards	Choice Chemistry (shared with Shannyn Sossamon)	40 Days and 40 Nights	Nominated	
2002	ShoWest Award	Male Star of Tomorrow	—	Won	
2006	Milan International Film Festival Award	Best Actor (tied with Peter Falk)	Lucky Number Slevin	Won	
2007	GQ Magazine Germany	GQ Männer des Jahres (GQ Men of the Year)	—	Won	
2008	Teen Choice Awards	Choice Horror Movie Actor	30 Days of Night	Nominated	
2008	WhatsOnStage Awards	The Dewynters London Newcomer of the Year	Rain Man	Won	
2009	21st Century Leaders Awards	Outstanding Environmentalist	—	Won	
2010	Ischia Global Film & Music Festival	Ischia International Arts Academy Acting Award	—	Won	
2017	Fangoria Chainsaw Awards	Best TV Actor	Penny Dreadful	Nominated	
2023	Screen Actors Guild Awards	Outstanding Performance by a Cast in a Motion Picture	Oppenheimer	Won	
2023	Critics' Choice Movie Awards	Best Acting Ensemble	Oppenheimer	Won	
2023	Capri Hollywood International Film Festival	Best Ensemble Cast	Oppenheimer	Won	
2023	Satellite Awards	Best Cast – Motion Picture	Oppenheimer	Won	
