= Saleka =

American singer-songwriter and actress (born 1996)

- Born: Saleka Shyamalan; August 1, 1996 (age 30); Bryn Mawr, Pennsylvania, U.S.
- Other names: Saleka Night; Saleka Night Shyamalan
- Occupations: Singer; songwriter; actor
- Years active: 2020–present
- Father: M. Night Shyamalan
- Relatives: Ishana Night Shyamalan (sister); Shivani Night Shyamalan (sister)
- Musical career
- Genre: Pop
- Instruments: Vocals; piano

Saleka Night Shyamalan (born August 1, 1996), known mononymously as Saleka, is an American singer-songwriter and actress. She is the daughter of director M. Night Shyamalan and was cast as a fictional popstar, Lady Raven, in his thriller film Trap (2024). As a singer, she has performed songs for her father's projects such as the Apple TV+ series Servant (2019–2023) and his films Old (2021) and Trap (2024), and also released her first studio album Seance (2023).

== Early life ==
Saleka is the eldest daughter of filmmaker M. Night Shyamalan. She and her sisters grew up watching horror films.

Saleka studied classical piano as a child but decided to pursue singing and songwriting. She studied Literary Arts and Music at Brown University.

== Career ==
Saleka has opened for acts like Boyz II Men, Baby Rose and Summer Walker. Upon debuting her first single, "Clarity", in September 2020, Refinery29 called Saleka "a new artist to watch". Saleka frequently collaborates with her younger sister, Ishana, who has directed a majority of her music videos.

Her debut album, Seance, was released in late 2022. Saleka recorded the majority of Seance at MilkBoy studios, Philadelphia.

In 2021, Saleka released "The Sky Cries" for the second season of Servant. The music video for the single was directed by her father, M. Night Shyamalan. She released three more songs for the third season of the series. The four songs were compiled in an EP, released on March 25, 2022. Within the show's canon, Saleka's songs are said to be from the never-seen, in-show performer, Vivian Dale, who has died tragically.

In June 2022, Giveon announced Saleka as one of four supporting acts for his North American Give or Take Tour on August and September 2022.

Saleka made her acting debut in her father's film Trap (2024), for which she also wrote fourteen songs. Her soundtrack album for the film, Lady Raven, was released on August 2, 2024.

== Discography ==
=== Studio albums ===
Title	Album details
Seance	Released: May 19, 2023; Label: Independent; Format: Streaming
Lady Raven	Released: August 2, 2024; Label: Columbia; Format: Streaming, Vinyl

=== Extended plays ===
Title	EP details	Track listing
Servant: Songs from the Attic (Music from the Apple TV+ Original Series)	Released: March 25, 2022; Label: Lakeshore Records; Format: Digital download, streaming	List: 1. "The Sky Cries"; 2. "One More Night"; 3. "There is a Place"; 4. "Take It or Leave It"
Servant: Songs from the Attic (Deluxe Edition) [Music from the Apple TV+ Original Series]	Released: March 17, 2023; Label: Lakeshore Records; Format: Digital download, streaming	List: 1. "The Sky Cries"; 2. "One More Night"; 3. "There is a Place"; 4. "Take It or Leave It"; 5. "All I Want"; 6. "Selfish"; 7. "Somewhere in the Wild"

=== Singles ===
Title	Year	Album
"Clarity"	2020	Seance
"Mr. Incredible"	2020	Seance
"Graffiti"	2021	Seance
"The Sky Cries"	2021	Servant: Songs from the Attic and Servant: Songs from the Attic (Deluxe Edition)
"Remain"	2021	Old (Original Motion Picture Soundtrack)
"How Many"	2021	Seance
"Seance"	2022	Seance
"Red Eyes"	2022	Seance
"Echo"	2022	Seance
"Release"	2024	Lady Raven

=== Music videos ===
Title	Year	Director(s)
"Clarity"	2020	Ishana Night Shyamalan
"Mr. Incredible"	2020	Ishana Night Shyamalan
"Grafitti"	2021	Ishana Night Shyamalan
"The Sky Cries"	2021	M. Night Shyamalan
"How Many" (Lyric video)	2021	Rafael "Rafatoon" Pérez
"Seance"	2022	Ishana Night Shyamalan
"Red Eyes" (Lyric video)	2022	Kevin Canales
"Samsara"	2023	Danica Kleinknecht

== Filmography ==
Year	Title	Role
2024	Trap	Lady Raven
