= Fight or Flight (2025 film) =

Film by James Madigan

- US theatrical release poster
- Directed by: James Madigan
- Written by: Brooks McLaren; D. J. Cotrona
- Produced by: Basil Iwanyk; Erica Lee; Chris Milburn; Tai Duncan
- Starring: Josh Hartnett; Charithra Chandran; Marko Zaror; Katee Sackhoff
- Cinematography: Matt Flannery
- Edited by: Ben Mills
- Music by: Paul Saunderson
- Production company: Asbury Park Productions
- Distributed by: Sky Cinema (United Kingdom); Vertical (United States)
- Release dates: February 28, 2025 (United Kingdom); May 9, 2025 (United States)
- Running time: 102 minutes
- Countries: United Kingdom; United States
- Language: English
- Box office: $4.3 million

Fight or Flight is a 2025 action comedy film directed by James Madigan in his feature film debut, and written by Brooks McLaren and D. J. Cotrona. It stars Josh Hartnett as a man who is recruited to identify and protect a wanted criminal aboard a commercial airline; Charithra Chandran, Marko Zaror, and Katee Sackhoff also star.

Fight or Flight was released in the United Kingdom on February 28, 2025, and in the United States on May 9. The film received positive reviews from critics, who praised Hartnett's performance.

== Plot ==
Following a raid on a hideout in Bangkok, an elusive hacker simply called the Ghost manages to escape. A government sect, operating as part of a social media app, manages to acquire enough information to locate the Ghost's escape route, via a flight to San Francisco. Agent Aaron Hunter informs head Katherine Brunt that due to lack of field agents in the area, they have no way of catching the Ghost in time. With no other option, Brunt decides to call upon disgraced former Secret Service agent Lucas Reyes, her former partner and boyfriend who was forced to go into hiding in Bangkok following a moral dilemma. Lucas is angered that Brunt would call him out of the blue, but with the promise of clearing his name, Lucas reluctantly takes the mission.

Due to the Ghost's elusiveness, Lucas's only way of identifying the hacker is a bullet wound. As he gets on the plane, he has a brief run-in with dancing obsessed killer Cayenne who tells him that the Ghost has a bounty. Lucas manages to kill Cayenne and then convinces airline stewards Isha and Royce to help him with locating the Ghost and the other killers. Brunt learns that due to the Ghost's actions, many high-end companies have also managed to locate Ghost's whereabouts onto the plane and have all hired assassins of their own. Lucas manages to figure out that Isha is the Ghost after noticing her cold sweating and gets her to begrudgingly trust him as he is the only person that is trying to keep her alive.

Lucas and Isha are forced to fend off the assassins with whatever is at their disposal, during which both their identities are spread to everyone in the plane. Lucas slowly bonds with Isha, revealing that her motives are based on the fact that she was once a trafficked child and slave and uses her skills to help free other child laborers. Brunt figures out that Hunter had kept information to himself about the Ghost: that she possessed a supercomputer that was capable of hacking into any encrypted coding. Knowing that possessing it will make their app company more powerful, Brunt agrees to Hunter's plan of securing it, should the plane arrive in San Francisco on time.

Isha is quickly aided by Master Lian, another passenger and ally on the plane along with her students, and together with a drug-induced Lucas fight through the rest of the assassins, while also causing the plane's hull to rupture. Despite descending and leveling the plane, both pilots are killed along with Lian and her students. A gravely-injured Lucas and Isha make it to the cockpit, but the plane misses its SFO landing, resulting in Brunt killing Hunter for his incompetence. Despite Brunt's attempts to get Lucas to turn Isha over, he refuses and resigns himself. Isha reveals that the computer had been piloting the plane the entire time, her real escape plan. Lucas passes out from his wounds.

Lucas wakes up in a war-torn hospital where a frantic Isha tells him that they are not finished yet, much to his chagrin.

== Cast ==
- Josh Hartnett as Lucas Reyes
- Charithra Chandran as Isha Mandhal
- Katee Sackhoff as Katherine Brunt
- Julian Kostov as Aaron Hunter
- Marko Zaror as Chayenne
- JuJu Chan Szeto as Master Lian
- Danny Ashok as Royce
- Hughie O'Donnell as Garrett
- Jyuddah Jaymes as Kyle Robinson
- Willem van der Vegt as Paul Simmons
- Sanjeev Kohli as Pilot
- Declan Baxter as Co-Pilot
- Sarah Lam as Mae
- Irén Bordán as Mrs. Nazareth
- Nóra Trokán as Cat Eyes
- Heather Choo as Monk Heather
- Claudia Heinz as Monk Claudia

== Production ==
The film is directed by James Madigan from a screenplay by Brooks McLaren and D. J. Cotrona which had previously appeared on the 2020 Black List of best unproduced screenplays. Producers are Tai Duncan, Basil Iwanyk and Erica Lee. The cast is led by Josh Hartnett, which also includes Charithra Chandran, Julian Kostov, Katee Sackhoff, Marko Zaror, and Rebecka Johnston as supporting characters. It was shot in Hungary, including at the Budapest Ferenc Liszt International Airport. Hartnett performed 100% of his own stunts.

== Release ==
Fight or Flight premiered in the United Kingdom on Sky Cinema on February 28, 2025. It was released in the United States on May 9, 2025.

=== Home media ===
On July 22nd, 2025, Fight or Flight was released on Blu-ray and DVD. The film had its American streaming premiere on Paramount+ on October 1st, 2025.

== Reception ==
=== Box office ===
The film made $2 million from 2,153 theaters in its opening weekend, finishing seventh at the box office.

=== Critical response ===
On the review aggregator website Rotten Tomatoes, 76% of 128 critics' reviews are positive, with an average rating of 6.0/10. The website's consensus reads: "Josh Hartnett's go-for-broke performance gives Fight or Flight wings, sustaining this daffy action-comedy at an entertaining cruising altitude that refreshingly doesn't wear out its welcome." Metacritic, which uses a weighted average, assigned the film a score of 59 out of 100, based on 22 critics, indicating "mixed or average" reviews. Audiences polled by CinemaScore gave the film an average grade of "C+" on an A+ to F scale, while those surveyed by PostTrak gave it three out of five stars, with 48% saying they would definitely recommend the film.

John Nugent in Empire magazine awarded the film three stars out of five and described it as having a "joyfully silly high-concept premise", which may be a "ludicrous mash-up" of ideas, but also "refreshing and fun to see such a gonzo, go-for-broke approach" and "equally cheering to see Hartnett commit fully, with an enjoyably deranged performance". Chris Wasser for the Irish Independent described it as a "glorified B-movie with a Hollywood lead", which is "amusing" and "fun" with "brutal, bone-crunching combat sequences", although it "wastes too much time trying to explain a haphazard plot".
