= Wolf Like Me (TV series) =

Australian television series (2022)

- Genre: Comedy drama Supernatural; Horror; Paranormal romance
- Written by: Abe Forsythe
- Directed by: Abe Forsythe
- Starring: Isla Fisher; Josh Gad; Ariel Donoghue
- Country of origin: Australia
- Original language: English
- No. of seasons: 2
- No. of episodes: 13

Production
- Executive producers: Jodi Matterson; Bruna Papandrea; Steve Hutensky; Isla Fisher; Josh Gad
- Production locations: Adelaide, South Australia
- Running time: 30 minutes
- Production companies: Fifth Season (Note: Known as Endeavor Content for the first season); Universal Television

Original release
- Network: Stan; Peacock
- Release: 13 January 2022 – 19 October 2023

Wolf Like Me is an Australian comedy-drama television series produced by Stan in association with NBCUniversal and Peacock. It premiered on both streaming services on 13 January 2022. In April 2022, Peacock renewed the series for a second season. As of January 2024 it is not clear if there will be a third series.

== Plot ==
Gary (Josh Gad) is a single father living in Adelaide, Australia with his 11-year-old daughter Emma; both of them are still emotionally traumatized by the death of Emma's mother, Lisa, seven years earlier. They meet Mary (Isla Fisher), an isolated advice columnist recovering from her own complex emotional baggage. Despite her attempts to stay away, they keep meeting again and again, in a cluster of coincidences that imply the hand of destiny. While Gary struggles to connect to his daughter, for Mary reaching Emma is all but effortless. However, Mary's baggage involves a deadly secret that she fears might hurt the two: she is a werewolf.

== Cast ==
=== Main ===
- Isla Fisher as Mary
- Josh Gad as Gary
- Ariel Donoghue as Emma

=== Recurring ===
- Anthony Taufa as Ray, Sarah's partner
- Alan Dukes as Trevor, Emma's psychiatrist
- Emma Lung as Sarah, Gary's sister-in-law
- Justin Rosniak as Robert
- Robin McLeavy as Caroline

=== Guests ===
- Caroline Brazier as Principal
- Catherine Văn-Davies as Melaine
- Edgar Ramirez as Anton
- Emily Barclay as Charlotte
- Geoff Morrell as Peter Stenning
- Helen Thomson as Jackie
- Jake Ryan as Shane
- Josh Quong Tart as Homeless Man
- Michael Denkha as a Taxi Driver
- Nash Edgerton
- Rahel Romahn as Kaos
- Robyn Nevin as Gwen
- Sarah Roberts as Tara

== Episodes ==
Season	Episodes	Originally released
1	6	January 13, 2022
2	7	October 19, 2023

=== Season 1 (2022) ===
No. overall	No. in season	Title	Directed by	Written by	Original release date
1	1	"Episode 1"	Abe Forsythe	Abe Forsythe	13 January 2022
Recent widower Gary cannot move on in relationships and has trouble connecting with his daughter Emma, who suffers from frequent panic attacks. Mary collides with their vehicle in traffic and rushes to Emma's aid when she has a severe panic attack. She and Gary bond over her apology; Emma appreciates Mary's obvious, but mysterious, understanding of extreme fear and daily anxiety. Gary and Mary agree to a short date, but Mary suddenly gets up and flees with no explanation at sundown.
2	2	"Episode 2"	Abe Forsythe	Abe Forsythe	13 January 2022
Gary finds Emma locked in the bathroom during an attempted suicide but manages to get her to the hospital in time. She begins therapy while Gary tries to move on from his attraction to Mary. He bumps into Mary and asks why she ran, but she cannot explain beyond stating she has baggage he couldn’t possibly understand. Realizing she took his keys by accident, he follows her home and becomes trapped when she locks herself in the basement with live animals and transforms into a werewolf.
3	3	"Episode 3"	Abe Forsythe	Abe Forsythe	13 January 2022
Mary faces a terrified Gary and tells him her full history. While on vacation with her husband in Prague, she was attacked by a wild animal and bitten in the arm. Surviving the attack, the following month she blacked out on the full moon and woke up in the woods with her husband missing. After being questioned by police, they concluded that the couple were attacked (again) by a wild animal that killed her husband and left her in shock. Gary takes some time to process but is encouraged by his family and friends to pursue be vulnerable again. By accident, Gary rear-ends Mary's car in a parking lot.
4	4	"Episode 4"	Abe Forsythe	Abe Forsythe	13 January 2022
A distracted Gary accidentally drives his car through the front of an Italian restaurant just after rear-ending Mary's car. In spite of this, Emma and Mary renew their bond over science fiction and Emma invites Mary to dinner over Gary (and Mary's) objections. As Mary leaves, Gary confesses that he feels a tremendous affection for her and that he is encouraged that Mary brings out the best in Emma but is reluctant to pursue a relationship with her because of her lycanthropy. He goes to her house and declares that he is "not perfect either" and the two kiss.
5	5	"Episode 5"	Abe Forsythe	Abe Forsythe	13 January 2022
Several months later, Gary and Mary are happy together and finding a rhythm to dealing with her transformations. Emma requests a new therapist when she realizes that she feels safe enough to be vulnerable around Mary. Gary suggests that they tell the truth to Emma, knowing that keeping the secret will only make it harder on Emma when she inevitably learns the truth; while Mary is scared of how Emma will take it, Gary is more afraid of the long-term damage of lying to Emma now that she trusts Mary. When Mary realizes that she's "late", Gary and Mary move up their plans, and take a camping trip to share Mary’s secret with Emma. When Emma points out how strangely they've been acting, they confess that Mary's pregnant.
6	6	"Episode 6"	Abe Forsythe	Abe Forsythe	13 January 2022
The family trip goes very well as Mary and Gary hike in the Australian Outback with Emma; however, Gary's car doesn't start when they try to return. As the full moon approaches, Gary and Mary become increasingly panicked while trying to locate a car service for help. Out of options at sundown, Mary instructs Gary to lock himself and Emma in the car, then sprints into the outback to put as much distance between them and "the wolf" as possible. As Gary and Emma wait in the car, two hunters stop to offer assistance; however, they shift from pleasant to threatening, implying that they want to rob, beat, and rape the two of them. Mary returns as a wolf and kills both of the hunters in front of a terrified Gary and Emma. When Emma asks what it is, Gary responds, "It's Mary. She turns into a wolf sometimes." In the morning, the pair find Mary and return to the city.

=== Season 2 (2023) ===
No. overall	No. in season	Title	Directed by	Written by	Original release date
7	1	"Episode 1"	Abe Forsythe	Abe Forsythe	19 October 2023
Six months have passed and Gary, Emma, and Mary have moved into a new home and settled into a new routine. While Mary fears that her baby may also be a "wolf," Gary and Emma decorate their new home for new child. Gary is especially proud of their new custom basement for Mary's transformations, and the couple attempt to sell Mary's old home. Mary and Gary begin seeing an obstetrician and attending birthing classes while Emma begins high school. Emma is accused of 'bullying' by another student, but Mary quickly and efficiently comes to her defense, learning that Emma was standing up for another student who was indeed being bullied by her accuser; the bullied student, Abigail, becomes Emma's first friend at the new school. Mary and Gary view the sonogram of their baby and are relieved to see that the child is human.
8	2	"Episode 2"	Abe Forsythe	Abe Forsythe	19 October 2023
Emma prepares to stay with her aunt Sarah and uncle Ray for another "date night" (full moon) and brings a class pet rabbit home. Gary gloats over his high tech upgrades to their security, all of which are now controlled through an app on his phone. Emma goes to her sleepover but has a panic attack, prompting Sarah to call Gary for more of her medicine. Gary mistakenly lets Mary loose in the house and narrowly avoids being eaten by throwing the rabbit at the wolf instead. Outside, he has difficulty explaining his injuries to Sarah, who suspects that Mary is abusing him and that Emma is covering for them both.
9	3	"Episode 3"	Unknown	Unknown	19 October 2023
Mary and Gary clean up the aftermath and argue the next day because the wolf didn't recognize Gary amid its rampage as he previously theorized. Emma meets with the school guidance counselor and tells her the full truth under the guise of a metaphor; the guidance counselor encourages her to set boundaries to prioritize her wellbeing. Gary meets Abigail's mother, Caroline, who is a client he helped previously. Nervous about Emma, he's caught spying on her with Abigail, but later commiserates with Caroline and discovers they have much in common. After Caroline hints that she would have been interested in Gary if he wasn't 'taken', Gary questions his commitment to Mary. Mary purchases an illegal firearm and offers Gary an 'out' in case he'd like to pursue a normal life.
10	4	"Episode 4"	Abe Forsythe	Abe Forsythe	19 October 2023
Gary offers to buy Mary's old vault door from the new owners; he surprises her with the vault door and proposes marriage. Now engaged, Gary and Mary begin birthing preparation in earnest, with their friends and family throwing her a bridal/baby shower. During the event, her former professor and paramour, Anton, arrives and charms his way into the gathering. Though he makes an eloquent toast to the couple, he also leaves a note encouraging Mary to "let her wolf run free." Mary later confesses that Anton was the first person she approached after her husband's death for support; she accidentally infected him as well, and he has spent the last twelve years roaming the world and experiencing his transformations in the wild. He drops by, unannounced, minutes before a full moon, forcing Gary and Mary to let him in for the transformation.
11	5	"Episode 5"	Abe Forsythe	Abe Forsythe	19 October 2023
Gary is deeply shaken by Anton and Mary's transformation because their wolves spent the entire night repeatedly copulating. After kicking Anton out, Gary and Mary fight about his emotional hurt, while she is shocked and fearful that he may have passed a wolf STD to her in the night that may hurt the baby. Gary spends the day having a mild breakdown and questioning whether the universe wants him to stay with Mary, both confiding in a homeless man and then by spending the day together in various hijinks. Mary confronts Anton and firmly states that she is neither interested nor willing to leave "her pack" to roam the world with Anton. Separately, Gary also confronts Anton, who reveals that memory loss is standard for transformations -- neither he nor Mary have any memory of what transpired. Gary apologizes and reconciles with Mary.
12	6	"Episode 6"	Abe Forsythe	Abe Forsythe	19 October 2023
Mary is two weeks away from her due date and doing her best to keep calm; Gary's attempts to plan out contingencies for the birth continue to raise her stress levels. Emma asks her dad to tell Sarah and Ray the truth since the family needs their support, but Gary is hesitant, since it is a lot to ask. Two police officers call in and interview Gary about the disappearance of the two hunters in the outback. Unnerved by their nonchalant but piercing approach, Gary lies about some of the details, then decides not to tell Mary. Sarah and Ray arrive to express concerns over Gary's behavior and their fears for Emma and Mary. The family comes clean, but neither Sarah nor Ray believe them and their fears are made worse when Mary fails to explain how 'the wolf' killed her husband several others. The police arrive to confiscate Gary's car for analysis and Mary's water breaks under the stress.
13	7	"Episode 7"	Abe Forsythe	Abe Forsythe	19 October 2023
Mary panics at the hospital, since the full moon is fast approaching and they are powerless to slow down or accelerate the birth. Gary is hard pressed to agree that they are now in the worst-case scenario and staying to protect the baby will undoubtedly expose her secret, while fleeing to a safe location may endanger the baby if the wolf decides to consume it. Ahead of schedule, Mary begins to transform while in labor, with more pain and anguish than any prior change. Out of options, Gary and Emma flee the hospital with Mary deeply in labor. Sarah and Ray attempt to talk them out of leaving until Mary howls an unearthly, animalistic noise. Terrified, but convinced, they help hijack an ambulance to drive Mary home, with Mary slowly transforming into the wolf before their eyes. They make it with only moments to spare while Mary gives birth; however, she is too exhausted to bring herself to the baby so it can nurse and imprint properly. Gary enters the basement and picks up their child (also a wolf) and carries the infant to Mary, relieved that this time 'the wolf' recognizes him. Outside, the police close in on the stolen ambulance and the barricaded house.

== Production ==
The six-part series was produced by Jodi Matterson, Bruna Papandrea and Steve Hutensky. It was written by Abe Forsythe, who also directed all 6 episodes. In April 2021 it was announced that Isla Fisher and Josh Gad would star in the series. In December further cast members were announced with Ariel Donoghue, Emma Lung and Anthony Taufa, and guest roles for Jake Ryan, Robyn Nevin and Nash Edgerton. The series was filmed in the Inner West of Sydney in the suburbs of Forest Lodge, Glebe, Ashfield and Ashbury, Western Sydney, Menai, Sutherland and regional NSW. On 26 April 2022, Peacock renewed the series for a second season.

== Release and reception ==
On 4 January 2022, a trailer was released, with it being described as "genre-bending." The series released all six 30-minute episodes on Peacock and Stan on 13 January 2022.

The series became available to view in Canada on Amazon Prime on 12 January 2022.

Overall, the series has been met by a positive reception. Metacritic, based on eight reviews, assigned the first season a rating of 69 out of 100, indicating "generally favorable reviews". Rotten Tomatoes gave the Season 1 a 65% critical approval rating and an average rating of 6.3/10 based on 20 reviews, though filtering for "Top Critics" the score rose to 75%. Stating that the Critic's Consensus of, "Wolf Like Me's mixed bag of occasionally disparate elements takes time to gel, but Isla Fisher and Josh Gad make it easy to be patient."
