= 2012 WTA Premier tournaments =

The 2012 WTA Premier tournaments are 21 of the tennis tournaments on the 2012 WTA Tour. The WTA Tour is the elite tour for women's professional tennis. The WTA Premier tournaments rank below the Grand Slam events and above the WTA International tournaments. They are divided into three levels: Premier Mandatory (Indian Wells, Miami, Madrid and Beijing), Premier 5 (Doha, Rome, Canada, Cincinnati and Tokyo), and Premier (12 tournaments in Europe, United States and Australia).

== Schedule ==
=== Premier ===
| Week of | Tournament | Champions | Runners-up | Semifinalists | Quarterfinalists |
|---|---|---|---|---|---|
| 2 January | 2012 Brisbane International; Brisbane, Australia | (Estonia) Kaia Kanepi; 6–2, 6–1 | (Slovakia) Daniela Hantuchová | (Belgium) Kim Clijsters (Italy) Francesca Schiavone | (Czech Republic) Iveta Benešová (United States) Serena Williams (Serbia) Jelena Janković (Germany) Andrea Petkovic |
| 2 January | 2012 Brisbane International; Brisbane, Australia | (Spain) Nuria Llagostera Vives (Spain) Arantxa Parra Santonja; 7–6^{(7–2)}, 7–6^{(7–2)} | (United States) Raquel Kops-Jones (United States) Abigail Spears | (Belgium) Kim Clijsters (Italy) Francesca Schiavone | (Czech Republic) Iveta Benešová (United States) Serena Williams (Serbia) Jelena Janković (Germany) Andrea Petkovic |
| 9 January | 2012 Apia International Sydney; Sydney, Australia | (Belarus) Victoria Azarenka; 6–2, 1–6, 6–3 | (China) Li Na | (Poland) Agnieszka Radwańska (Czech Republic) Petra Kvitová | (Denmark) Caroline Wozniacki (France) Marion Bartoli (Czech Republic) Lucie Šafářová (Slovakia) Daniela Hantuchová |
| 9 January | 2012 Apia International Sydney; Sydney, Australia | (Czech Republic) Květa Peschke (Slovenia) Katarina Srebotnik; 6–1, 4–6, [13–11] | (United States) Liezel Huber (United States) Lisa Raymond | (Poland) Agnieszka Radwańska (Czech Republic) Petra Kvitová | (Denmark) Caroline Wozniacki (France) Marion Bartoli (Czech Republic) Lucie Šafářová (Slovakia) Daniela Hantuchová |
| 6 February | Open GDF Suez; Paris, France | (Germany) Angelique Kerber; 7–6^{(7–3)}, 5–7, 6–3 | (France) Marion Bartoli | (Belgium) Yanina Wickmayer (Czech Republic) Klára Zakopalová | (Russia) Maria Sharapova (Germany) Mona Barthel (Germany) Julia Görges (Italy) Roberta Vinci |
| 6 February | Open GDF Suez; Paris, France | (United States) Liezel Huber (United States) Lisa Raymond; 7–6^{(7–3)}, 6–1 | (Germany) Anna-Lena Grönefeld (Croatia) Petra Martić | (Belgium) Yanina Wickmayer (Czech Republic) Klára Zakopalová | (Russia) Maria Sharapova (Germany) Mona Barthel (Germany) Julia Görges (Italy) Roberta Vinci |
| 20 February | Barclays Dubai Tennis; Championships; Dubai, UAE | (Poland) Agnieszka Radwańska; 7–5, 6–4 | (Germany) Julia Görges | (Denmark) Caroline Wozniacki (Serbia) Jelena Janković | (Slovakia) Daniela Hantuchová (Serbia) Ana Ivanovic (Australia) Samantha Stosur (Germany) Sabine Lisicki |
| 20 February | Barclays Dubai Tennis; Championships; Dubai, UAE | (United States) Liezel Huber (United States) Lisa Raymond; 6–2, 6–1 | (India) Sania Mirza (Russia) Elena Vesnina | (Denmark) Caroline Wozniacki (Serbia) Jelena Janković | (Slovakia) Daniela Hantuchová (Serbia) Ana Ivanovic (Australia) Samantha Stosur (Germany) Sabine Lisicki |
| 2 April | Family Circle Cup; Charleston, USA | (United States) Serena Williams; 6–0, 6–1 | (Czech Republic) Lucie Šafářová | (Slovenia) Polona Hercog (Australia) Samantha Stosur | (Russia) Nadia Petrova (Russia) Vera Zvonareva (Germany) Sabine Lisicki (United States) Venus Williams |
| 2 April | Family Circle Cup; Charleston, USA | (Russia) Anastasia Pavlyuchenkova (Czech Republic) Lucie Šafářová; 5–7, 6–4, [10–6] | (Spain) Anabel Medina Garrigues (Kazakhstan) Yaroslava Shvedova | (Slovenia) Polona Hercog (Australia) Samantha Stosur | (Russia) Nadia Petrova (Russia) Vera Zvonareva (Germany) Sabine Lisicki (United States) Venus Williams |
| 23 April | Porsche Tennis Grand Prix; Stuttgart, Germany | (Russia) Maria Sharapova; 6–1, 6–4 | (Belarus) Victoria Azarenka | (Poland) Agnieszka Radwańska (Czech Republic) Petra Kvitová | (Germany) Mona Barthel (China) Li Na (Germany) Angelique Kerber (Australia) Samantha Stosur |
| 23 April | Porsche Tennis Grand Prix; Stuttgart, Germany | (Czech Republic) Iveta Benešová (Czech Republic) Barbora Záhlavová-Strýcová; 6–4, 7–5 | (Germany) Julia Görges (Germany) Anna-Lena Grönefeld | (Poland) Agnieszka Radwańska (Czech Republic) Petra Kvitová | (Germany) Mona Barthel (China) Li Na (Germany) Angelique Kerber (Australia) Samantha Stosur |
| 21 May | Brussels Open; Brussels, Belgium | (Poland) Agnieszka Radwańska; 7–5, 6–0 | (Romania) Simona Halep | (Estonia) Kaia Kanepi (Sweden) Sofia Arvidsson | (Belgium) Alison Van Uytvanck (Bulgaria) Tsvetana Pironkova (Slovakia) Dominika Cibulková (Poland) Urszula Radwańska |
| 21 May | Brussels Open; Brussels, Belgium | (United States) Bethanie Mattek-Sands (India) Sania Mirza; 6–3, 6–2 | (Poland) Alicja Rosolska (China) Zheng Jie | (Estonia) Kaia Kanepi (Sweden) Sofia Arvidsson | (Belgium) Alison Van Uytvanck (Bulgaria) Tsvetana Pironkova (Slovakia) Dominika Cibulková (Poland) Urszula Radwańska |
| 18 June | Aegon International; Eastbourne, UK | (Austria) Tamira Paszek; 5–7, 6–3, 7–5 | (Germany) Angelique Kerber | (France) Marion Bartoli (Czech Republic) Klára Zakopalová | (Bulgaria) Tsvetana Pironkova (Czech Republic) Lucie Šafářová (Russia) Anastasia Pavlyuchenkova (Russia) Ekaterina Makarova |
| 18 June | Aegon International; Eastbourne, UK | (Spain) Nuria Llagostera Vives (Spain) María José Martínez Sánchez; 6–4, ret. | (United States) Liezel Huber (United States) Lisa Raymond | (France) Marion Bartoli (Czech Republic) Klára Zakopalová | (Bulgaria) Tsvetana Pironkova (Czech Republic) Lucie Šafářová (Russia) Anastasia Pavlyuchenkova (Russia) Ekaterina Makarova |
| 9 July | Bank of the West Classic; Stanford, USA | (United States) Serena Williams; 7–5, 6–3 | (United States) Coco Vandeweghe | (Romania) Sorana Cîrstea (Belgium) Yanina Wickmayer | (South Africa) Chanelle Scheepers (Slovakia) Dominika Cibulková (Poland) Urszula Radwańska (France) Marion Bartoli |
| 9 July | Bank of the West Classic; Stanford, USA | (New Zealand) Marina Erakovic (United Kingdom) Heather Watson; 7–5, 7–6^{(9–7)} | (Australia) Jarmila Gajdošová (United States) Vania King | (Romania) Sorana Cîrstea (Belgium) Yanina Wickmayer | (South Africa) Chanelle Scheepers (Slovakia) Dominika Cibulková (Poland) Urszula Radwańska (France) Marion Bartoli |
| 16 July | Mercury Insurance Open; San Diego, USA | (Slovakia) Dominika Cibulková; 6–1, 7–5 | (France) Marion Bartoli | (Chinese Taipei) Chan Yung-jan (Russia) Nadia Petrova | (United States) Christina McHale (Serbia) Jelena Janković (United States) Varvara Lepchenko (Poland) Urszula Radwańska |
| 16 July | Mercury Insurance Open; San Diego, USA | (United States) Raquel Kops-Jones (United States) Abigail Spears; 6–2, 6–4 | (United States) Vania King (Russia) Nadia Petrova | (Chinese Taipei) Chan Yung-jan (Russia) Nadia Petrova | (United States) Christina McHale (Serbia) Jelena Janković (United States) Varvara Lepchenko (Poland) Urszula Radwańska |
| 20 August | New Haven Open at Yale; New Haven, USA | (Czech Republic) Petra Kvitová; 7–6^{(11–9)}, 7–5 | (Russia) Maria Kirilenko | (Denmark) Caroline Wozniacki (Italy) Sara Errani | (Belarus) Olga Govortsova (Slovakia) Dominika Cibulková (France) Marion Bartoli (Czech Republic) Lucie Šafářová |
| 20 August | New Haven Open at Yale; New Haven, USA | (United States) Liezel Huber (United States) Lisa Raymond; 4–6, 6–0, [10–4] | (Czech Republic) Andrea Hlaváčková (Czech Republic) Lucie Hradecká | (Denmark) Caroline Wozniacki (Italy) Sara Errani | (Belarus) Olga Govortsova (Slovakia) Dominika Cibulková (France) Marion Bartoli (Czech Republic) Lucie Šafářová |
| 15 October | Kremlin Cup; Moscow, Russia | (Denmark) Caroline Wozniacki; 6–2, 4–6, 7–5 | (Australia) Samantha Stosur | (Serbia) Ana Ivanovic (Sweden) Sofia Arvidsson | (Czech Republic) Klára Zakopalová (Serbia) Vesna Dolonc (Slovakia) Dominika Cibulková (Russia) Maria Kirilenko |
| 15 October | Kremlin Cup; Moscow, Russia | (Russia) Ekaterina Makarova (Russia) Elena Vesnina; 6–3, 1–6, [10–8] | (Russia) Maria Kirilenko (Russia) Nadia Petrova | (Serbia) Ana Ivanovic (Sweden) Sofia Arvidsson | (Czech Republic) Klára Zakopalová (Serbia) Vesna Dolonc (Slovakia) Dominika Cibulková (Russia) Maria Kirilenko |
