= Nativity of Our Lord Catholic School =

Nativity of Our Lord School

Location
- 1900 Stanford Ave; Saint Paul, Ramsey County, Minnesota 55105; United States; 44°55′55″N 93°10′51″W

Information
- Type: Catholic private school
- Religious affiliation: Christianity
- Denomination: Roman Catholic
- Established: 1923
- Status: Currently operational
- NCES School ID: 00700487
- Principal: Kate Wollan
- Religious head: Rolf Tollefson
- Faculty: 47 (on an FTE basis)
- Grades: PK-8
- Gender: Coeducational
- Enrollment: 711 (2023-2024)
- Average class size: 22
- Student to teacher ratio: 14.6:1
- Language: English
- Hours in school day: 6.8
- Campus type: Neighborhood
- Colors: Blue and White
- Athletics: yes
- Athletics conference: Catholic Athletic Conference
- Sports: Cross country, track, softball, baseball, tennis, golf, volleyball, basketball, soccer, hockey, swimming
- Mascot: Nigel the Nighthawk
- Nickname: Nighthawks
- Annual tuition: $7,350
- Affiliation: NCEA
- Website: school.nativity-mn.org
- Last updated: 3/27/2026

Nativity of Our Lord School is a Catholic private school instructing grades PK-8 in Saint Paul, Minnesota, United States.

The school was founded in 1923 and has expanded over the years. In 2008, the school completed a significant renovation, including a new library and entrance. In December 2017 and January 2018, the school renovated and repainted its gymnasium floor after it began lifting during a November renovation.

== Fundraising and community events ==
Every year, Nativity hosts the Nativity County Fair in its parking lot. It lasts from a Friday evening through the following Sunday, and features rides and games.
