= Trap (2024 film) =

Film by M. Night Shyamalan

- Theatrical release poster
- Directed by: M. Night Shyamalan
- Written by: M. Night Shyamalan
- Produced by: Ashwin Rajan; Marc Bienstock; M. Night Shyamalan
- Starring: Josh Hartnett; Ariel Donoghue; Saleka Night Shyamalan; Hayley Mills; Alison Pill
- Cinematography: Sayombhu Mukdeeprom
- Edited by: Noëmi Preiswerk
- Music by: Herdís Stefánsdóttir
- Production company: Blinding Edge Pictures
- Distributed by: Warner Bros. Pictures
- Release dates: July 24, 2024 (Alice Tully Hall); August 2, 2024 (United States)
- Running time: 105 minutes
- Country: United States
- Language: English
- Budget: $30 million
- Box office: $83.6 million

Trap is a 2024 American thriller film produced, written, and directed by M. Night Shyamalan. The film stars Josh Hartnett, Ariel Donoghue, Shyamalan's daughter Saleka Night, Hayley Mills, and Alison Pill. The film follows Cooper Abbott, a serial killer known as the Butcher, who attends a concert with his teenage daughter Riley, only to discover the event has been intercepted by police who have been tipped off that he would be present.

The film was shot in Canada in late 2023. It premiered in New York City on July 24, 2024, and was theatrically released in the United States by Warner Bros. Pictures on August 2, 2024. It received mixed reviews from critics and grossed $83 million on a $30 million budget.

== Plot ==
Philadelphia firefighter Cooper Abbott takes his teenage daughter, Riley, to pop star Lady Raven's concert as a reward for her good grades. Noticing the unusually high police presence around the concert venue, Cooper learns from a vendor named Jamie that the FBI has learned a serial killer named "the Butcher" will be in attendance. Cooper, who is revealed to be the Butcher, secretly checks footage on his phone of his latest captive victim, Spencer, whom he is holding in a basement. He steals Jamie's ID card and learns the passphrase that will identify him as an employee, using the card to gain access to a back room and steal a police radio.

Hearing a woman predicting his movements over the radio, Cooper sets off an explosion in a food stand's kitchen and uses the chaos to access the roof, where he learns from a police officer that the manhunt is led by Dr. Josephine Grant, an FBI profiler. Confused by Cooper's behavior, Riley asks him to stay with her. She says she hopes to be chosen as Lady Raven's "Dreamer Girl", who gets to dance on stage with the singer and receives backstage access. Believing the backstage exit is not covered by the police, Cooper meets Lady Raven's uncle, one of the spotters, and lies to him that Riley recently recovered from leukemia, leading to her selection as the "Dreamer Girl".

After the concert ends, Cooper learns that the police are also guarding the backstage exit. He privately reveals himself as the Butcher to Lady Raven, threatening to kill Spencer remotely if she does not escort him and Riley out in her limousine. She complies but asks to come to Riley's house, where she stalls for time by explaining the FBI operation to the family, unsettling Cooper by describing Grant's profile of him as someone with maternal issues and obsessive–compulsive disorder. She also explains that the police discovered details about the Butcher's attendance at the concert via a torn ticket receipt left in a vacant house that was reported anonymously.

Lady Raven steals Cooper's phone and locks herself in the bathroom. She obtains details from Spencer about where he was taken and livestreams it to her fans, one of whom finds and rescues him. She reveals Cooper's identity as the Butcher to his wife Rachel, and he locks his family upstairs while Lady Raven texts her driver to contact the police. Cooper attempts to drive off with Lady Raven, but Cooper's family escapes and distracts him long enough for her to flee into her limousine. The police arrive and Cooper flees the house through a secret tunnel before disguising himself using a SWAT uniform and driving the limousine off with Lady Raven. After he reveals his identity, she unlocks the window and incites a mob of fans to swarm the car so the FBI can catch up. Cooper changes into a fresh set of civilian clothes and gets away.

Cooper returns home and confronts Rachel. Rachel confesses that she suspected he was the Butcher, left the receipt in the vacant house for the police to find, and reported it. Cooper decides to kill her and then himself, but Rachel persuades him to share some leftover pie she made for Riley. After Cooper expresses his rage at Rachel for causing him to miss seeing his children grow up, he realizes Rachel drugged the pie with pills from his tool bag, causing him to hallucinate his mother expressing pride in him for feeling a real emotion. He is captured by Grant and two SWAT officers as he walks up to her. As he is led away, he stops to adjust Riley's bicycle and shares a tearful embrace with her before being loaded into a police van. In the back of the van, Cooper unlocks his cuffs with a spoke he secretly took from Riley's bike and laughs to himself.

Later, Jamie is shocked to find out that Cooper was the Butcher while watching the news, after exclaiming that he had helped him. He vows not to talk to anyone at work anymore.

== Cast ==
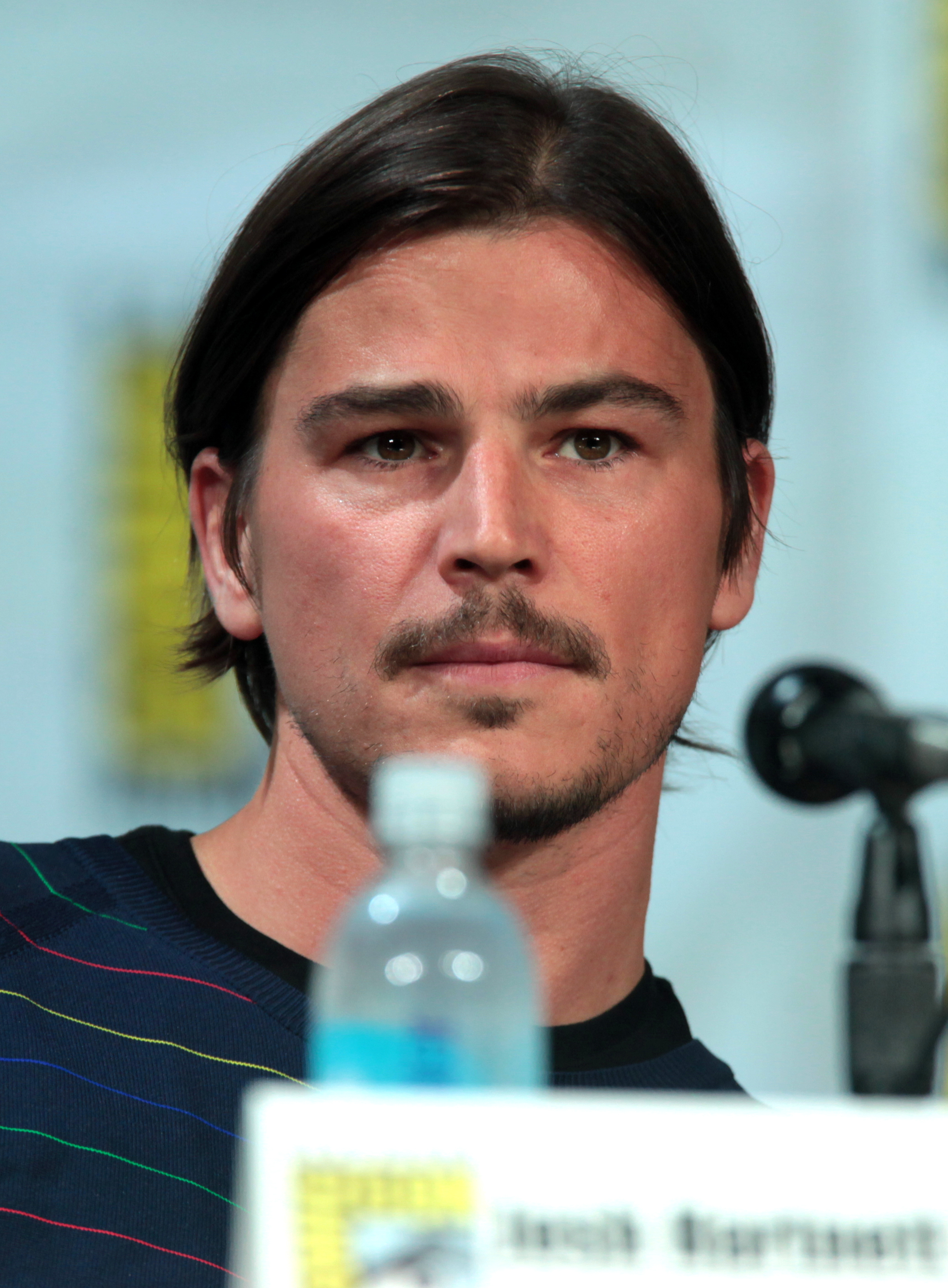
Josh Hartnett plays Cooper, a serial killer.

- Josh Hartnett as Cooper, a firefighter and Riley's father
- Ariel Donoghue as Riley, Cooper's daughter who is a fan of Lady Raven
- Saleka Night Shyamalan as Lady Raven, a famous singer whom Riley adores
- Alison Pill as Rachel, Cooper's wife and Riley and Logan's mother
- Hayley Mills as Dr. Josephine Grant, an FBI profiler
- Jonathan Langdon as Jamie, a vendor at the concert
- Mark Bacolcol as Spencer, a captive of the Butcher
- Marnie McPhail-Diamond as Jody's mom, the mother of one of Riley's former friends
- Scott "Kid Cudi" Mescudi as the Thinker, a singer who performs with Lady Raven
- Russell "Russ" Vitale as Parker Wayne, a singer who performs with Lady Raven
- Marcia Bennett as Cooper's mom, who appears to him in various hallucinations
- Lochlan Miller as Logan, Cooper and Rachel's young son
- M. Night Shyamalan makes a cameo appearance as Lady Raven's uncle, who works as a spotter at the concert
- Mateo Arias makes a cameo appearance as the lead singer of Papa's Boots in the opening scene of the movie.

== Production ==
=== Development and pre-production ===
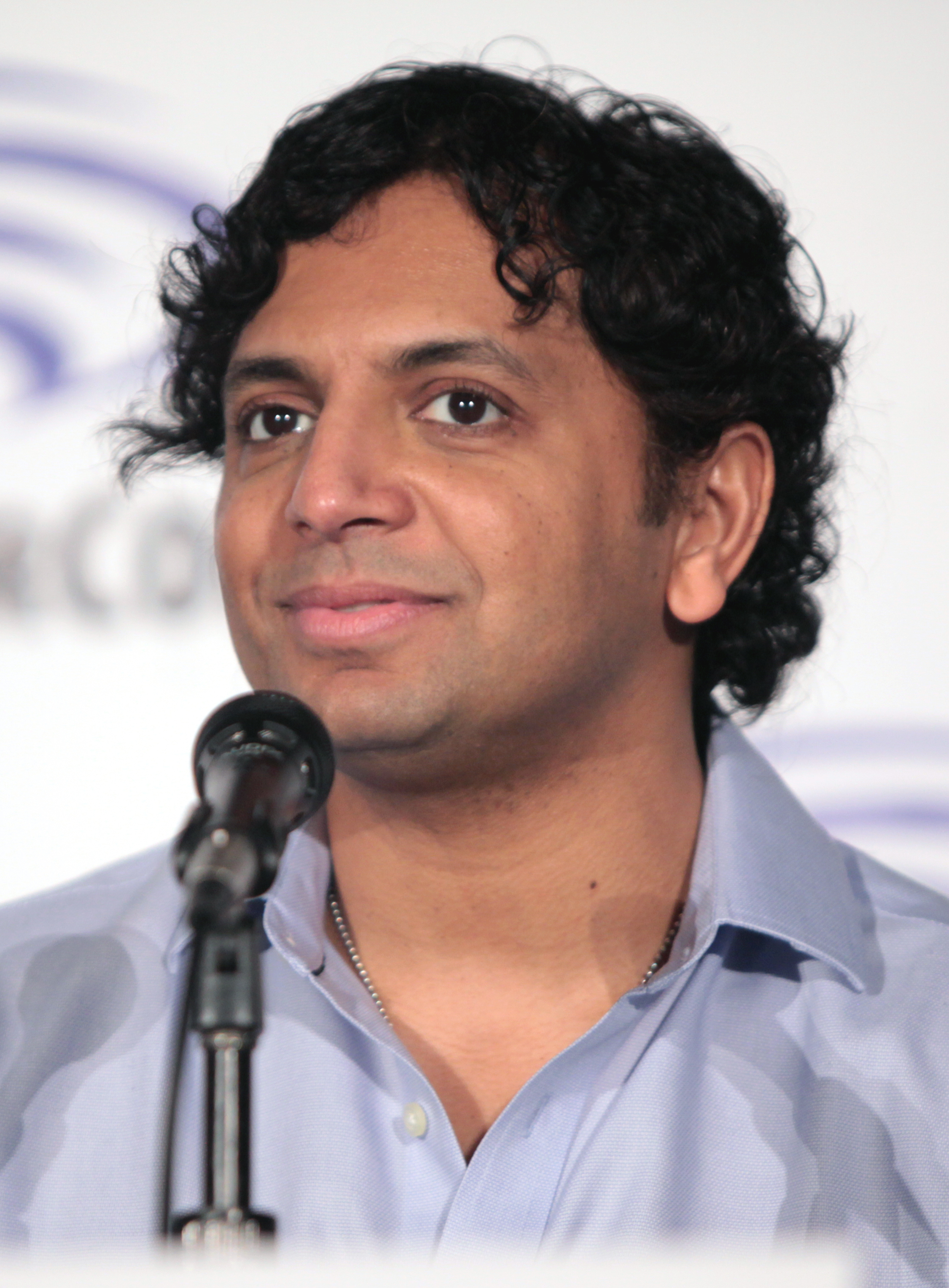
Writer and director M. Night Shyamalan

In October 2022, Universal Pictures announced a then-untitled film from filmmaker M. Night Shyamalan. In February 2023, the film was revealed to be titled Trap when it changed distributor, as Shyamalan and his production company Blinding Edge Pictures entered a first-look deal with Warner Bros. Pictures. The film sprouted from conversations Shyamalan had with his daughter, singer-songwriter Saleka, about combining the concert and theatrical experience and devising an album for a narrative, similar to how Prince wrote the titular album for the 1984 musical film Purple Rain. Shyamalan initially planned to let another filmmaker write the script and direct the film from his original idea for a thriller set at a concert, before changing his mind after realizing he could make the film with Saleka.

The premise was inspired in part by Operation Flagship, a 1985 sting operation in which disguised law enforcement arrested 101 wanted fugitives at a convention center, having invited them under the pretense of gifting them free NFL tickets and an opportunity to win an all-expenses-paid trip to Super Bowl XX. Shyamalan pitched Trap as setting The Silence of the Lambs (1991) at a Taylor Swift concert, in reference to her Eras Tour, and wrote the screenplay in five-and-a-half months, a personal record for him. He produced the film with Marc Bienstock and Ashwin Rajan.

Saleka stars as singer Lady Raven, whose concert the characters attend. As her father was writing the script, she composed fourteen songs for the film, designed diegetically to match the action onscreen. Saleka previously collaborated with her father by making a single for the film Old (2021) and an EP for the series Servant. Shyamalan was inspired to incorporate musical elements by Purple Rain and visiting Saleka on tour. Saleka also noted Bollywood cinema, in which music often plays a key role in the storytelling, as an influence, and listed Adele, Billie Eilish, Rihanna, Rosalía, and Taylor Swift as inspirations for her performance. She described Trap as a "Shyamalan American version of a Bollywood movie that is grounded and the songs make sense — not necessarily a musical, but completely music-centric."

As with his recent, self-funded projects, Shyamalan and a storyboard artist had the film storyboarded and held extensive rehearsals with the actors. Shyamalan originally intended to frame the film in a 4:3 aspect ratio, but after a discussion with cinematographer Sayombhu Mukdeeprom, they agreed it limited their ability to shoot the movie and was "too much work" to create a feeling of claustrophobia. They changed it to a 1.85:1 aspect ratio, and the film was re-storyboarded. Josh Hartnett did not watch any media in preparation for the role of "Cooper" to make the character his own and researched psychopathy, including books about serial killers. Shyamalan wrote Hayley Mills's investigator character as a "maternal figure" to contrast Cooper's lack of empathy. Ariel Donoghue, who plays Cooper's daughter Riley, attended school in between filming.

=== Filming and post-production ===
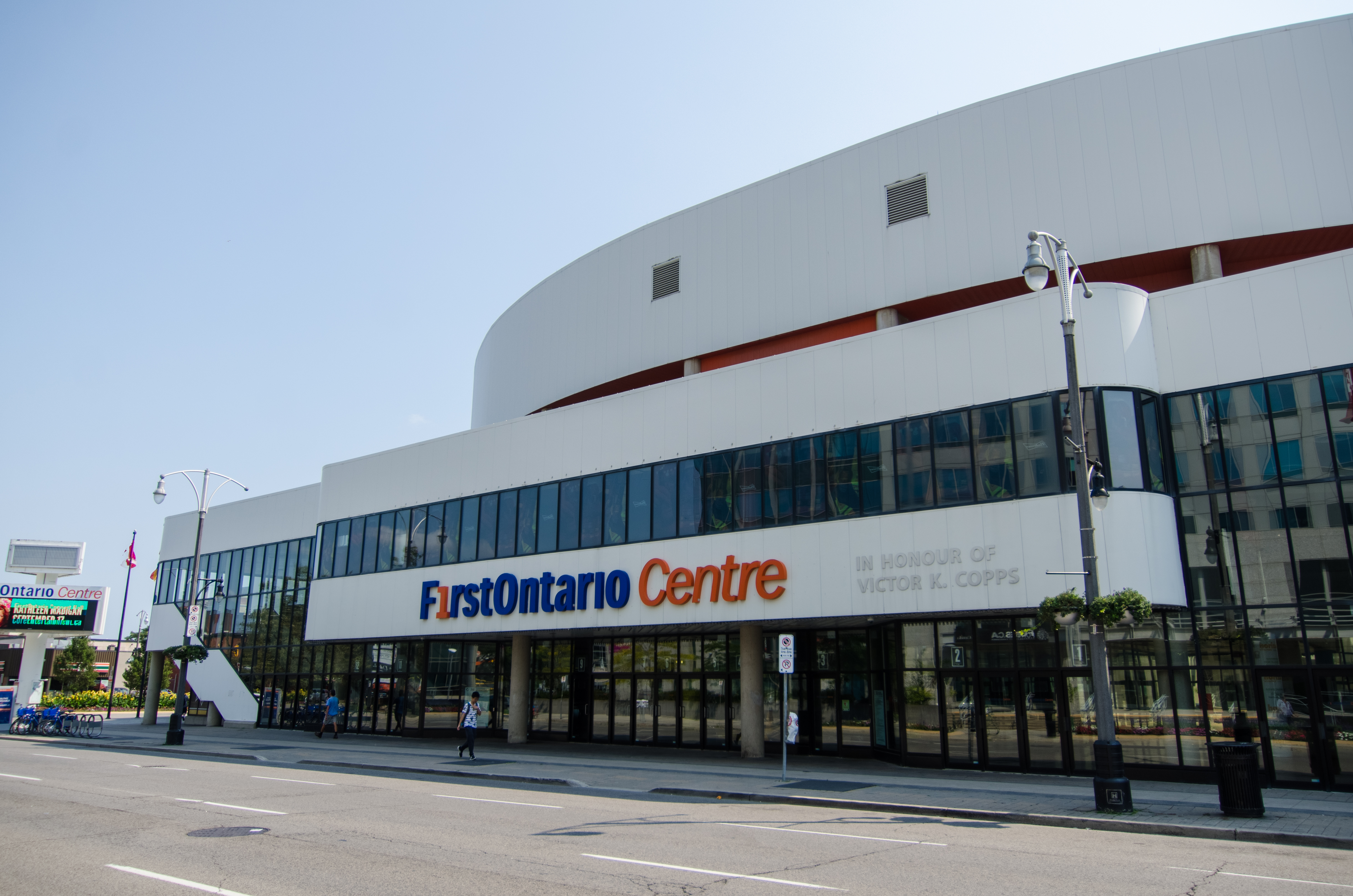
The film was shot at TD Coliseum.

Principal photography was originally scheduled to begin in Cincinnati, Ohio, USA in August 2023, where it would have received over $9 million in tax credits from the state to film there. Production relocated to Toronto, Ontario, and was granted an interim agreement on September 18, 2023, to film during the SAG-AFTRA strike. Under the working title Good Grades, filming was scheduled to occur from October 16 to December 8, 2023. The film's pop concert venue, known as "Tanaka Arena", was filmed in Hamilton, Ontario, inside TD Coliseum, a 20,000-seat arena that the production obtained access to for two to three months because it was undergoing renovations. Toronto's Rogers Centre stood in as the venue's exterior.

Songs in the film were performed on stage as if it were a real concert. Cora Kozaris was the choreographer, and a videographer recorded onstage material and projected it onto the stadium's screens in real-time. The shoot involved thousands of extras, who were not told what the film was about but received Saleka's music beforehand to be able to sing along. Hartnett recalled multiple extras consoling him because they thought he was nervous and were unaware of the character he was playing. The order of filming consisted of audience reactions, with music playing, followed by Saleka dancing and miming on stage, and then, after the extras went quiet, actors with dialogue, with a beat track in the background to help actors maintain rhythm. Hartnett and Donoghue screamed parts of their dialogue to match the intended noise levels of a concert. For conversational scenes in which actors would look into the camera lens, Shyamalan attached a one-way mirror to the lens that would reflect off another mirror and allow the actor in close-up to see the other actor. Trap was shot on 35mm film stock, which required the crew to wait three days for dailies to be processed and returned from a film laboratory in Los Angeles to review.

Trap was released the same year as The Watchers, the directorial debut of Saleka's sister Ishana Night Shyamalan; a poster for The Watchers appears in the background of a scene in Trap. Saleka and Ishana Shyamalan worked on their respective films on their family's property in Pennsylvania, with Saleka operating in a recording studio while Ishana mixed her film next door. Editing and mixing were completed on June 22, 2024. In August 2024, Deadline Hollywood reported the film's production budget to be $30 million.

== Music ==
Herdís Stefánsdóttir composed the film's score independently from Saleka. The soundtrack album, Lady Raven, features Kid Cudi and Russ (both of whom star in the film) as well as Amaarae. It was released by Columbia Records on August 2, 2024. The songs "Release", "Save Me", and "Divine" were released as singles.

== Release ==
Trap was released in the United States by Warner Bros. Pictures on August 2, 2024. It is the second film of Shyamalan's to be distributed by the studio after Lady in the Water (2006), and marks the filmmaker's departure from Universal Pictures, which distributed five consecutive films of his, starting with The Visit in 2015. Universal initially scheduled the film's release for April 5, 2024. In 2023, Warner Bros. acquired and pushed the film to August 2, 2024. In 2024, they postponed it a week to August 9, and later brought it forward to August 2 again.

The film premiered at Alice Tully Hall in New York City on July 24, 2024. It did not screen for critics before its theatrical release. Regarding marketing results, RelishMix described social media buzz as "mixed-positive" and Deadline Hollywood reported low awareness but high interest similar to that received by Longlegs earlier in the year. Trap's social media content accumulated 259.2 million impressions across platforms, 47 percent above norms for first-installment genre titles. The film was released on digital platforms on August 30, 2024. On November 5, 2024, it released on Blu-ray, DVD and Ultra HD Blu-ray. Trap became available to stream on Max on October 25, 2024.

== Reception ==
=== Box office ===
Trap grossed $42.8 million in the United States and Canada, and $39.9 million in other territories, for a worldwide total of $82.7 million.

In the United States and Canada, Trap was projected to gross $15–20 million from 3,181 theaters in its opening weekend, with one estimate at $25 million. The film made $6.6 million on its first day, including an estimated $2.2 million from Thursday night previews. It debuted to $15.5 million, finishing third at the box office behind holdovers Deadpool & Wolverine and Twisters. The film earned $6.7 million in its second weekend, shifting to sixth place, and $3.4 million in its third, dropping to eighth. It left the box office top ten in its fourth weekend with $1.7 million.

=== Critical response ===
On the review aggregator website Rotten Tomatoes, 57% of 249 critics' reviews are positive, with an average rating of 5.8/10. The website's consensus reads: "An arch thriller given some grounding by Josh Hartnett's committed performance, Shyamalan's Trap will ensnare those who appreciate its tongue-in-cheek style while the rest will be eager to wriggle out from it." According to the website, critics thought the film was "another divisive work" from Shyamalan, "but its dark humor, tense atmosphere and a strong central performance may just be enough for fans of his work." Metacritic, which uses a weighted average, assigned the film a score of 52 out of 100, based on 46 critics, indicating "mixed or average" reviews. Audiences polled by CinemaScore gave the film an average grade of "C+" on an A+ to F scale, while those surveyed by PostTrak gave it an overall positive score of 66%, with an average rating of 2.5 out of 5 stars.

Benjamin Lee of The Guardian gave the film 2/5 stars, writing: "Trap is a thriller that incorrectly thinks it's fiendishly smart. Maybe if it was more aware of how stupid it actually is, it might have been a lot more fun." Peter Travers of ABC News wrote: "Hartnett performs miracles in making Cooper a serial butcher and a devoted family man living in the same body. You believe him, which is a trick Shyamalan otherwise fails to achieve as this misfire builds to a sequel-begging climax that ups the ante on shameless." Vanity Fair's Richard Lawson said that Shyamalan "has built a solid foundation, as he tends to do: clever setup, appealing lead actor, and an interesting (and quite relevant) cultural milieu. But fairly quickly, Trap's sleek design peels away, and we see the shoddy engineering it's been hiding."

Jesse Hassenger of The A.V. Club gave the film a B+ grade, writing that it "may cook more purely and entertainingly than anything in [Shyamalan's] last decade of self-styled pop hits. But it also suggests that there are discordant notes that he can't, and probably shouldn't, ever get out of his system." IndieWire's Ryan Lattanzio gave it a B grade, calling it "too plausibility-stretching to be actually scary, but Hartnett's well-calibrated performance as a psycho dad, the type who sends PTA moms all aflutter, is too dangerously charismatic to ignore."

Filmmakers Luca Guadagnino and Drew Hancock both cited Trap as among their favorite films of 2024, with Hancock describing it as "105 minutes of Josh Hartnett having the time of his life. And what's not to love about that?" In France, Cahiers du Cinéma placed it ninth on their top 10 films of 2024.

== Viewership ==
According to data from Showlabs, Trap ranked second on Netflix in the United States during the week of 10–16 March 2025.
