= 21st Century Leaders Awards =

South African humanitarian award

The 21st Century Leaders, founded in 2003, was established by Charlotte di Vita MBE, who served as a Goodwill Ambassador for the Nelson Mandela Children’s Fund. The 21st Century Leaders programme was launched by Trade plus Aid, British Charity Registration 1061376. Trade plus Aid is an ethical trading organisation established in order to create environmentally sound and economically viable means to alleviate poverty in impoverished communities, initially in Africa.

The organisation now runs an international campaign entitled Whatever It Takes which, through the sale of ethically traded goods featuring the original artwork of celebrities, seeks to raise money and awareness for organizations working in education, climate change, poverty reduction and health primarily in Africa. In South Africa the organization works on a biogas digester programme to promote environmentally sustainable lifestyles in rural areas.

The organisation founded the 21st Century Leaders Awards, an award designed to highlight the work of leaders of popular culture who have sought to use their celebrity to encourage social change.

== Mission ==
21st Century Leaders mission is to assist and encourage royalty, Nobel Peace Prize laureates, and celebrities from the fields of film, music, fashion, art, sport and literature etc. - to raise awareness and funds for environmental and sustainable human development solutions.

== Whatever It Takes to Make a Difference Campaign ==
The campaign started in December 2002 and requests that celebrity leaders design and donate a symbol of hope for the 21st century, as well as a stick figure self-portrait and a message of hope. Over 740 celebrities' artworks are reproduced on socially and environmentally responsible products sold internationally to support alleviation of poverty, environmental conservation, and the protection of children.

== Trade plus Aid South Africa ==
Trade plus Aid has been working in South Africa for over 18 years, administering various community development, and social outreach programs. The projects are focused on social and economic upliftment and infrastructure development of impoverished rural communities especially those surrounding the damaging long-term consequences of climate change.

The biogas digester program is an effort to motivate an introduction of appropriate and sustainable energy generation for the agricultural sector as well as promoting a holistic approach to nutrient balancing and soil management. The organisation reinvests funds from the commercial biogas digester programme into the installation of family size rural household digesters to replace the need for the gathering of wood fuel for meal preparation and heating.

=== 2009 Outstanding Humanitarians Awardees ===
The first award ceremony was held on October 30, 2009 in Doha, Qatar and awarded British actor Sir Ben Kingsley CBE, American actor Josh Hartnett, director and producer Danny Boyle & Christian Colson, tennis champions Serena & Venus Williams, and opera singer Monica Yunus.

Sir Ben Kingsley CBE was awarded for his continued aid of disadvantaged young people and children and for his portrayal of the humanitarian role-models Simon Wiesenthal, Itzhak Stern and Gandhi.

Danny Boyle & Christian Colson, director & producer of the film Slumdog Millionaire, were awarded for their creation of an international children’s development organization focused on education and sanitation, and designed to improve the lives of children in Mumbai’s slum communities and for the Jai Ho Trust, an independent trust which aims to ensure that Rubina Ali (who played the youngest Latika in the film) and Azharuddin Mohammed Ismail (youngest Salim) receive an education, housing and social support. The trust will also hold a sum of money for the two children until they reach adulthood.

Monica Yunus was awarded because the organization she co-founded, Sing For Hope, mobilizes more than 600 professional artists - from classical musicians to photographers to Broadway performers - in volunteer service programs that benefit communities in need. Considered an artists’ peace corps, the organization’s three core programs are performance arts-educational outreach for underserved children, healing arts- in-hospital performances and workshops that complement the healing process, Gala arts - Benefit concerts that raise awareness and funds for humanitarian causes

=== 2009 Outstanding Leadership Awardees ===
Serena Williams and Venus Williams were awarded for their “Williams Sisters Tour” which raises money for the Ronald McDonald House and for Hurricane Katrina victims and The Serena Williams Foundation which focuses on education, and helping underprivileged children in Africa who cannot afford to go to school or college to do so.

=== 2009 Outstanding Environmentalist Awardee ===
Josh Hartnett was awarded for his work with Global Cool, a charity focused on climate change on whose behalf Hartnett met with former prime minister Tony Blair and has since taken the message of greenhouse gas reduction to a wider audience.

=== Regional Unsung Heroes ===
HE Sheikha Hanadi Bint Nasser Bin Khaled Al Thani of Qatar presented three outstanding women and Unsung Hero Award.

- Helena Shehadh - founder of school for blind and visually impaired children in Palestine.
- Eman Obaudly & Son Ghaneml - a Qatari mother proudly raising her son Ghanem who has caudal regression syndrome in the public eye, who lobbies on behalf of handicap-able children like her son.
- Sara Mohamed Al Shamlan - a student at Qatar Academy who used her talent as a photographer to change the lives of impoverished children in Abu Hamour, Doha.
