= List of fictional countries by region =

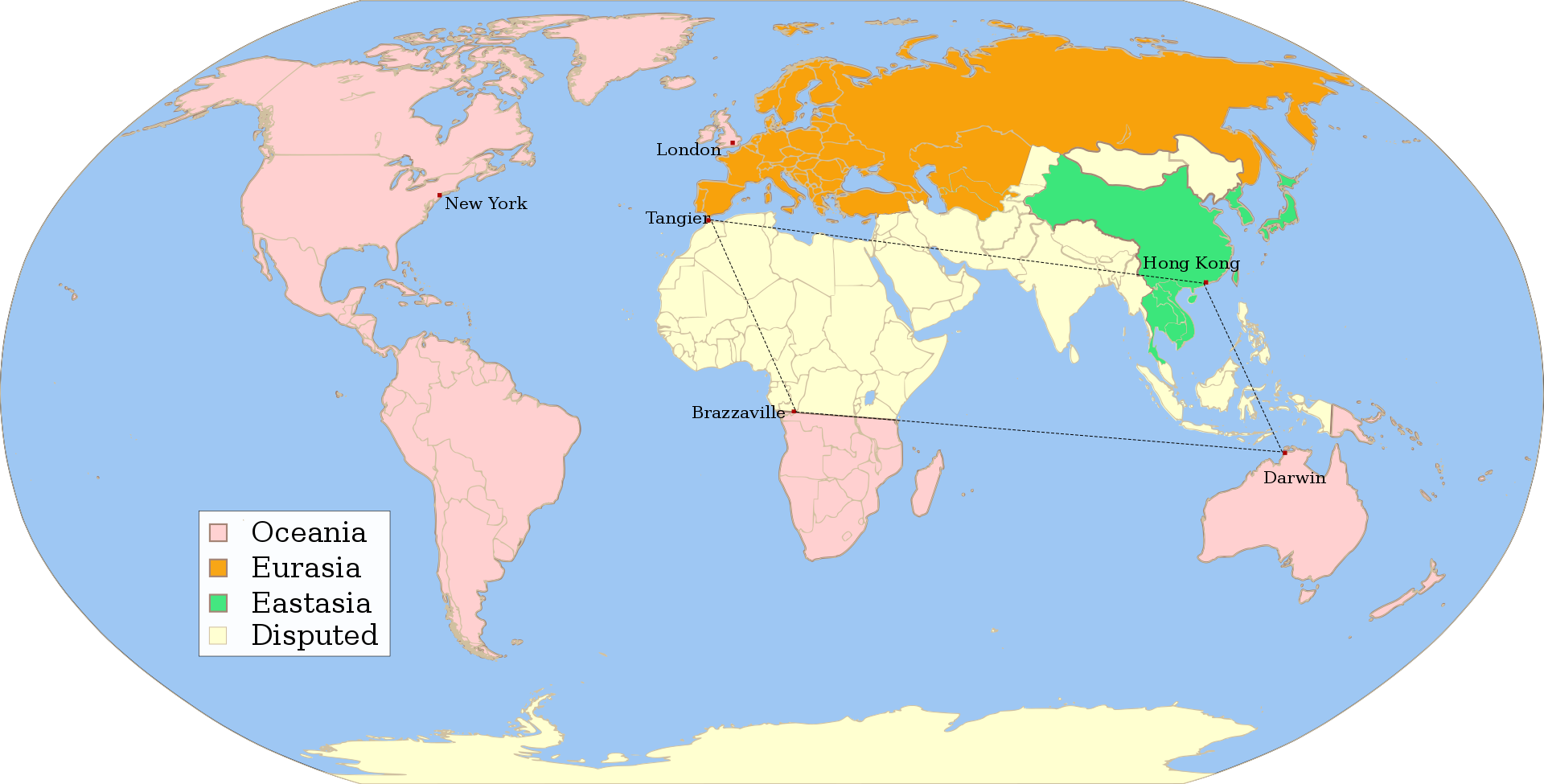
Map of fictional countries from the novel Nineteen Eighty-Four.

This list of fictional countries groups fictional countries and imagined nations together, by the region of the world in which they are presumed to be located.

== Africa ==
- Africa: Africa is portrayed as one country in various works, typically comprising an expansive and sparsely populated jungle or savanna.
- Babar's Kingdom: from children's book, a country of intelligent bipedal elephants.
- Bangalla: From The Phantom comic strip. The Phantom's base lies in the deep woods of this central African nation.
- Genosha: An island nation which was established as a mutant homeland in the Marvel Comics universe.
- Khokarsa: An ancient African empire that serves as the primary setting for Philip José Farmer's Khokarsa series.
- Nambia: An African country usually said as a mispronunciation of Namibia erroneously stated likely due to the prevalence of nations with similar name such as Gambia and Zambia.
- Opar: Located deep in the jungles of Africa. Portrayed as a lost colony of Atlantis in Edgar Rice Burroughs's series of Tarzan novels.
- Wakanda: A small African nation in the Marvel Comics universe. The nation is ruled by King T'Challa, also known as the superhero Black Panther.

== Americas ==
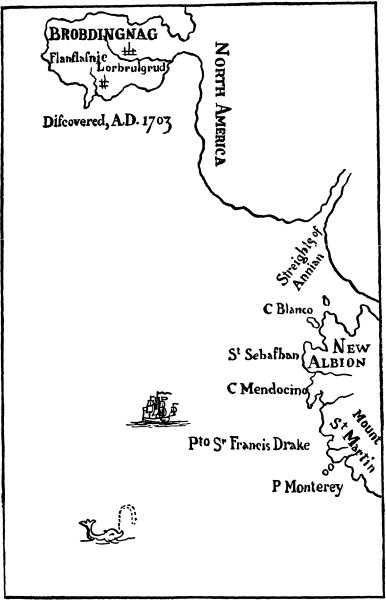
Brobdingnag (Pt II, Gulliver's Travels)

- Brobdingnag: A fictional country from the novel Gulliver's Travels by Jonathan Swift. As described by Swift, Brobdingnag extends some 2000 miles westward from Canada's Pacific coast, and is inhabited by a race of giants
- Caesar's Legion is an autocratic, ultra-reactionary, utilitarian slaver army founded in 2247 by Edward Sallow (Who later adopted the name "Caesar") and Joshua Graham. It is largely inspired and partially based on the ancient Roman Empire, though it is not the Roman Empire, the Roman Republic or even its military, the Legion. It is a slave army with trappings of foreign-conscripted Roman legionaries during the late empire. All military, no civilian, and with none of the supporting civilian culture. It appears only in Fallout: New Vegas
- Oceania: A totalitarian superstate combining the United States and the British Empire, in George Orwell's Nineteen Eighty-Four, consisting of the entire Americas, as well as Great Britain, Ireland, Greenland, Iceland, Australia, New Zealand, Polynesia, and Southern Africa
- The New California Republic (NCR) is a federal presidential republic founded in New California by Aradesh also formerly leader of Shady Sands, comprising five contiguous states and additional territories and holdings in pre-War regions in Nevada, Arizona, Oregon, and parts of Mexico. The Republic dedicates itself to the values of the old world: Democracy, liberty, the rule of law, all in order to make the wasteland a better place. However, its policies resulted in difficulties in recent years. It was founded in 2186, is mentioned in Fallout 3 and Fallout 4, and appears in Fallout 2 and Fallout: New Vegas
- San Escobar: a non-existent country, mistakenly mentioned by Polish Minister of Foreign Affairs Witold Waszczykowski.
- San Sombrèro: a Central American country from the parody travel guidebook of the same name; from the same authors as Molvanîa and Phaic Tăn
- Val Verde: a Spanish-speaking country resembling Panama, Nicaragua or maybe Colombia, from the films Commando, Predator and Die Hard 2

== Asia ==
- Eastasia: One of the countries in the 1949 dystopian novel Nineteen Eighty-Four.
- Glubbdubdrib: An island of sorcerers and necromancers located near Japan in Gulliver's Travels.
- Luggnagg: An island of miserable immortals located near Japan in Gulliver's Travels.
- Shangri-La: A small, peaceful kingdom in the western Himalayan Mountains featured in the 1933 novel Lost Horizon.
- Madripoor: An island principality located between Singapore and Indonesia, featured in Marvel Comics.
- Phaic Tăn: A country in Indochina, featured in the parody travel book of the same name.
- Sarkhan: A country analogous to Vietnam in the novel The Ugly American. It is the location of a war between the United States and Communist insurgents.

== Europe ==
- Atropia: A pro-Western dictatorship used for US and NATO exercises; exercise maps depict the country's borders as loosely corresponding to those of Azerbaijan.
- Borduria: A totalitarian state from the comics series The Adventures of Tintin, located in the Balkans. Its first appearance is in King Ottokar's Sceptre (1938).
- Eurasia: A superstate in George Orwell's Nineteen Eighty-Four formed from Europe and the former Soviet Union.
- Grand Fenwick: A Duchy in The Mouse That Roared and sequels by Leonard Wibberley.
- Graustark: An Eastern European country in several novels by George Barr McCutcheon.
- Latveria: A kingdom in the Marvel Comics universe that is ruled by the villain Doctor Doom.
- Listenbourg: A country at the edge of the Iberian Peninsula which originated as an internet meme spread on Twitter.
- Lower Slobovia: An island country in Al Capp's Li'l Abner
- Molvanîa: Eastern European country from a parody travel guidebook; from the same authors as Phaic Tăn and San Sombrèro.
- Oceania: A super state in George Orwell's Nineteen Eighty-Four referring to Great Britain, the Americas, Australasia and southern Africa.
- Poictesme: A country situated roughly in the south of France in the books of James Branch Cabell.
- Pottsylvania: from Jay Ward's cartoon series The Rocky and Bullwinkle Show.
- Ruritania: A kingdom in central Europe from Anthony Hope's The Prisoner of Zenda and associated works, which gave rise to the Ruritanian romance genre. It is used in Ernest Gellner's nonfictional Nations and Nationalism as a stereotypical country developing nationalism.
- Slaka: A Balkan communist country in Malcolm Bradbury's Rates of Exchange and its sequel Why Come to Slaka?. It also featured in the BBC drama, the Gravy Train moves East.
- Island of Sodor: A large island in the Irish Sea, between the Isle of Man and the English mainland near Barrow-in-Furness in Cumbria, to which it is connected by bridge. The setting for the Reverend W. Awdry's The Railway Series and its television adaptation.
- Soviet Unterzoegersdorf: The "last existing appanage republic of the USSR", a fake country created by monochrom for theatre performances and computer games.
- Syldavia: A Balkan monarchy featured in four stories of The Adventures of Tintin, neighbouring Borduria.
- Veyshnoria: An opponent state created for the joint Russo-Belarusian Zapad 2017 exercise, concurrently co-opted as an internet micronation by elements of the Belarusian opposition and others. The territory of Veyshnoria corresponds to the Grodno Region and the northwestern parts of the Minsk and Vitebsk regions.

== Island nations ==
- Blefuscu: a land where all the people are tiny from the book Gulliver's Travels by Jonathan Swift. Enemies of Lilliput
- Genosha: an island nation which was established as a mutant homeland in Marvel Comics
- Lilliput: a land where all the people are tiny from the book Gulliver's Travels by Jonathan Swift
- Skull Island: from King Kong movie(s)
- Patusan: an island nation somewhere in the South China Sea in the movie Surf Ninjas as well as in the film The Last Electric Knight and the TV series Sidekicks. Also mentioned in Lord Jim by Joseph Conrad.

== Uncertain ==
- Kekistan: based on the word "Kek", a variant of the acronym “LOL” (laugh out loud).
- The Land of Oz: L. Frank Baum's Oz books as well as the novel and play Wicked and its sequels.
