= List of fictional countries set on Earth =

This is a list of fictional countries from published works of fiction (books, films, television series, games, etc.), with links to separate articles for further information about the individual entries. The fictional countries in the following list are described as located somewhere on the surface of the Earth as opposed to underground, inside the planet, on another world, or during a different "age" of the planet with a different physical geography.

== List ==
Name	Flag	Work	Notes
Absurdistan		Politische Studien (1971)	An imaginary land in which absurdity is the norm, especially in its public authorities and government.
Atlantis		Timaeus, and Critias (360 BC)	Fictional island mentioned within an allegory on the hubris of nations in Plato's works Timaeus and Critias. It represents the antagonist naval power that besieges "Ancient Athens", the pseudo-historic embodiment of Plato's ideal state. Atlantis falling out of favor with the deities and submerging into the Atlantic Ocean. In many other works Atlantis has become an advanced prehistoric civilization in contemporary fiction, from comic books to films.
Atropia		United States Army's DATE World	Fictional Caucasus republic modeled after Azerbaijan, used for exercises by the U.S. military and allies. Part of the DATE World, a fictional world developed by the U.S. Army that is modeled after the real world with different countries but very similar geopolitical situations.
Babar's Kingdom		Babar the Elephant series, first appearance in Histoire de Babar (1931)	Country, supposedly in Northern Africa, inhabited by intelligent elephants that are usually bipedal and civilized.
Balnibarbi		Jonathan Swift's satirical novel Gulliver's Travels (1726)	Balnibarbi is a fictional kingdom visited by Lemuel Gulliver after he was rescued by the people of the flying island of Laputa. The book states that the kingdom of Balnibarbi is part of a continent which extends itself "eastward to that unknown tract of America westward of California and northward of the Pacific Ocean", and places it southeast of Luggnagg, which is "situated to the North-West".
Bangalla		Lee Falk's comic strip The Phantom	Former British colony that since became a democracy. Initially set near India, it is the home country of the Phantom. In the 1996 movie adaptation, it is set in Asia, while the 2009 miniseries places it as a small island nation in the Malay Archipelago. In recent stories, its setting was moved to East Africa, in the region around Tanzania, Kenya, Uganda, and Ethiopia, with its capital being Mawitaan (formerly Morristown).
Blefuscu		Jonathan Swift's satirical novel Gulliver's Travels (1726)	Land where all the people are tiny.
Borduria		The Adventures of Tintin (1938–1976)	Totalitarian state from the comics series, located in the Balkans and neighbouring Syldavia. It is depicted as a stereotypical Eastern Bloc country.
Brobdingnag		Jonathan Swift's satirical novel Gulliver's Travels (1726)	Land occupied by giants.
Cameliard		Legend of King Arthur	Kingdom of the young Princess Guinevere, ruled by her father, King Leodegrance.
Eastasia		1984 (novel)	Eastasia comprises China, the Mainland Southeast Asia, the Japanese islands, and a large but fluctuating portion of Manchuria, Mongolia, and Tibet. The ideology of Eastasia is Death-Worship.
Eurasia		1984 (novel)	Eurasia comprises "the whole of the northern part of the European and Asiatic landmass from Portugal to the Bering Strait". Eurasia was formed after the Soviet Union annexed continental Europe following a war between the Soviet Union and the Allies. The ideology of Eurasia is Neo-Bolshevism.
Freedonia		Duck Soup	European country from the 1933 Marx Brothers film. Rufus T. Firefly, played by Groucho Marx, is appointed leader of the troubled nation. Conflict with neighbouring Sylvania looms. Chaos ensues.
Freedonia		Despicable Me 3	Mediterranean European Anglophone country. Is shaped like a pig's head. The name was inspired by the 1933 film Duck Soup.
Genosha		Marvel Comics	Island nation that has been home to a mutant sanctuary and concentration camp at various points.
Genovia		The Princess Diaries	A small European principality that the protagonist Mia Thermopolis becomes the princess of.
Glubbdubdrib		Jonathan Swift's satirical novel Gulliver's Travels (1726)	Small island nation (about one-third the size of the Isle of Wight) governed by a tribe of magicians; from the novel by Jonathan Swift.
Gondal			Imaginary world created by Emily Brontë and Anne Brontë.
Grand Fenwick		The Mouse That Roared	Duchy in The Mouse That Roared (1955) and sequels by Leonard Wibberley.
Graustark		Various works	Eastern European country in several novels by George Barr McCutcheon.Other McCutcheon fictional countries include Axphaine, Drawsbergen, Nedra, and Oolooz.
Grinlandia		Novels by Alexander Grin	Name of the country is never mentioned by the author himself, and the name Grinlandia was suggested in 1934 by literary critic Korneliy Zelinsky.
Groland		Ce soir avec les Nouveaux	Micro-state at an undisclosed location, created as a satire of France and European microstates by Benoît Delépine, Christian Borde and Christophe Salengro.
Latveria		Marvel Comics	Isolated European kingdom ruled by the tyrannical Doctor Doom.
Libertatia		Mythical city	Mythical city founded by pirates where equality and freedom reign supreme
Lilliput		Gulliver's Travels	Land where all the people are tiny from the book by Jonathan Swift.
Listenbourg		Created as an internet meme in October 2022.	Fictional country attached to the west of the Iberian Peninsula designed to poke fun at the poor geographical knowledge of Americans.
Lower Slobbovia		Li'l Abner	Occasional exotic setting for the classic hillbilly comic strip by Al Capp.
Luggnagg		Jonathan Swift's satirical novel Gulliver's Travels (1726)	Luggnagg is an island kingdom, one of the imaginary countries visited by Lemuel Gulliver. It has two principal ports, Clumegnig on the southeast coast, which is visited by ships from Maldonada (the port city of Balnibarbi), and Glanguenstald in the southwest, which has commerce with Japan. The capital of Luggnagg is Traldragdubb.
Madripoor		Marvel Comics	Island nation located in Southeast Asia.
Meropis		Philippica	Parody of Atlantis created by Theopompus of Chios.
Molvanîa		Molvanîa: A Land Untouched by Modern Dentistry	Former Post-Soviet Republic from a parody guide
New California Republic		Fallout, Fallout 2, and Fallout: New Vegas	Self-proclaimed republic located in what was once the U.S. states of California, Nevada, and Oregon, with territory in the Baja strip. Founded by Vault 15 survivors and surrounding powers in 2186. The benevolent republic supports many old-world values.
North American Confederacy		The Probability Broach	Country in an alternate timeline where the Whiskey Rebellion resulted in a libertarian utopia free of governmental interference and consequently a more advanced world, technologically and civilization-wise.
Oceania		1984 (novel)	Totalitarian state, led by Big Brother, founded following an anti-capitalist revolution, which, while intended to be the ultimate liberation of its proletariat (proles), soon ignored them.
Oz, Land of		The Wonderful Wizard of Oz	Absolute monarchy divided into four quadrants, Munchkin Country, Winkie Country, Gillikin Country, and Quadling Country.
Parador		Moon over Parador	Small South American country ruled by dictator, ruled by actor Jack Noah impersonating the former president who died
Patusan		Various	Island nation somewhere in the South China Sea in Lord Jim by Joseph Conrad. Also mentioned in the 1993 film Surf Ninjas as well as in the film The Last Electric Knight and the TV series Sidekicks.
Phaic Tăn		Phaic Tăn: Sunstroke on a Shoestring	Indochinese country from a parody travel guidebook.
Poictesme		Biography of the Life of Manuel	Country situated roughly in the south of France in the books of James Branch Cabell.
Pottsylvania		The Rocky and Bullwinkle Show	A military dictatorship; parody of the Soviet Union and Eastern Bloc countries.
Rapture		BioShock	An underwater city-state, initially intended as a utopia for the world's greatest thinkers and artists, but a lack of government turned the city dystopian, with severe wealth disparity and genetic modifications. A civil war eventually left most of its population dead, and the few survivors insane.
Ruritania		The Prisoner of Zenda	German-speaking kingdom in central Europe from Anthony Hope's The Prisoner of Zenda and associated works. Also used in Ernest Gellner's nonfictional Nations and Nationalism as a stereotypical country developing nationalism.
Saint Marie		Death in Paradise	Caribbean island on which the series is set. It is a British overseas territory.
San Escobar		internet meme	San Escobar is a Latin American country that originated as a blunder of Polish Minister of Foreign Affairs Witold Waszczykowski and later became an internet meme.
San Serriffe		The Guardian	Island nation created for April Fools' Day, 1977.
San Sombrèro		San Sombrèro	Central American country from a parody travel guidebook.
Shangri-La		Lost Horizon	Mystical, harmonious valley, enclosed in the western end of the Himalaya in James Hilton's 1933 novel.
Slaka		Rates of Exchange, Why Come to Slaka?	Balkan communist country in Malcolm Bradbury's Rates of Exchange and its sequel, Why Come to Slaka?.
Sodor		The Railway Series	A fictional nation geographically located in between the Isle of Man and Great Britain, it is the setting for The Railway Series.
Soviet Unterzoegersdo			"Last existing appendage republic of the USSR", a country created by monochrom for theatre performances and computer games.
Spensonia		Thomas Spence works	Island between "Utopia and Oceana", where English mariners form a communal society in Thomas Spence's 18th century writings.
Syldavia		The Adventures of Tintin	Balkan monarchy featured in four stories of The Adventures of Tintin, neighbouring Borduria.
Themyscira		DC Comics	Hidden island queendom in either the Atlantic Ocean or Mediterranean Sea settled by the Greek mythological all-female warrior Amazons ruled by DC's version of the mythical Queen Hippolyta. Original home of Wonder Woman. Originally called "Paradise Island." Not to be confused with the real-world ancient Greek town Themiscyra (note the different placements of the vowels "i" and "y"), legendary home of the Amazons.
Utopia		Utopia	A communistic country in the new world where private property does not exist and gold is made to be disliked.
Val Verde		Commando, Predator, Die Hard 2, Supercarrier	Spanish-speaking country resembling Nicaragua, in the films Commando, Predator, Die Hard 2, Jack Mimoun et les secrets de Val Verde, and the TV series, Supercarrier.
Veyshnoria		Zapad 2017	Fictional East European state created for a joint Russo-Belarusian military training exercise. It neighbours Belarus and is an enemy of the Union State. Veyshnoria occupies most of Grodno Region and the northwestern parts of the Minsk and Vitebsk regions.
Wakanda		Marvel Comics	Small African nation featured in the Marvel Comics series The Avengers. The nation is ruled by King T'Challa, also known as the superhero Black Panther. The country is isolationist and concealed from the outside world in order to protect the valuable metal vibranium that makes it one of the world's most technologically advanced nations.

== See also ==
- List of fictional countries by region
- Fictional country
- -stan § Fictional
