= San Serriffe =

Typography-themed April Fools' Day hoax

- First appearance: 1 April 1977
- Created by: Philip Davies and Guardian staff

In-universe information
- Type: Fictional island nation
- Location: Indian Ocean

Front Page of the supplement

San Serriffe is a fictional island nation invented for April Fools' Day 1977 by Britain's The Guardian newspaper. It was featured in a seven-page hoax supplement, published in the style of contemporary reviews of foreign countries. It commemorated the tenth anniversary of the island's independence, complete with themed advertisements from major companies. The supplement provided an elaborate description of the nation as a tourist destination and developing economy, but most of its place names and characters were puns and plays on words relating to printing (such as "sans-serif" and names of common fonts). The original idea was to place the island in the Atlantic Ocean near Tenerife, but because of the ground collision of two Boeing 747s there a few days before publication, it was moved to the Indian Ocean, near the Seychelles islands. Because of this, the authors made San Serriffe a moving island – a combination of coastal erosion on its west side and deposition on the east cause it to move towards Sri Lanka, with which it will eventually collide.

San Serriffe was one of the most famous and successful hoaxes of the 20th century; it has become part of the common cultural heritage of literary humour, and a secondary body of literature has been derived from it. The nation was reused for similar hoaxes in 1978, 1980 and 1999. In April 2009, the geography, history and culture of San Serriffe featured heavily in The Guardian's cryptic crossword. On April Fools’ Day 2026 its outline was used by the online geography quiz Worldle as the country which players had to guess.

== Background ==
The idea for the hoax came from The Guardian's Special Reports Manager Philip Davies. In a 2007 interview, he said "The Financial Times was always doing special reports on little countries I'd never heard of. I was thinking about April Fool's Day 1977 and I thought, why don't we just make a country up?" Special Reports editor Stuart St Clair Legge suggested the name San Serriffe. Geoffrey Taylor designed the semicolon-shaped map of the island, based on a shrunken version of New Zealand.

Initially, the supplement featuring the fictitious archipelago was to be a single page. The newspaper then realised that a larger review would generate greater revenue by running themed advertising alongside the text. These included a request for submissions to a photography competition sponsored by Kodak: "If you've got a photograph of San Serriffe, Kodak would like to see it."

== Reception ==
In an era before the widespread use of desktop publishing and word processing software, much of the terminology was little-known, the jokes were easily missed, and many readers were fooled. Many others recognised the joke and became part of it. The Guardian received hundreds of letters from readers describing memorable holidays to the islands. It also received a letter from the "San Serriffe Liberation Front" critical of the pro-government slant to the supplement.

Editor Peter Preston received letters of complaint from airlines and travel agents due to the disruption caused by customers who refused to believe the islands did not exist.

== Legacy ==
A large body of secondary work about San Serriffe has been written since 1977. A Friends of San Serriffe club was established, with its "life president" writing annual April Fools' Day letters to the paper. Bird & Bull Press published several books about esoteric subjects relating to the country, including Booksellers of San Serriffe, First Fine Silver Coinage of the Republic of San Serriffe and The World's Worst Marbled Papers.

Donald Knuth offers a reward to anyone finding a mistake in one of his publications; from October 2008 onwards, this has been in the form of a "certificate of deposit" from the fictitious Bank of San Serriffe.

== See also ==
- Fictitious entry
- List of April Fools' Day jokes
- Freedonia
- List of fictional countries
  - Phaic Tăn, another fictitious country
  - Molvanîa, a parody travel guide
  - San Escobar, another fictitious country
  - Grand Fenwick, another fictitious country
  - San Sombrèro, a parody travel guide

== Sources ==
- Martin Wainwright (2007). The Guardian Book of April Fool's Day. Aurum. p. 68. ISBN 978-1845131555.
- "Visit San Serriffe". The Guardian. 1 April 1978.
- Bachaus, Theodore (pseudonym of Henry Morris) (1978). The World's Worst Marbled Papers: Being a Collection of Ten contemporary San Serriffean Marbled Papers. Port Clarendon, San Serriffe: San Serriffe Publishing Co. (but actually Newtown, PA: Bird & Bull Press).
- Bachaus, Theodore (pseudonym of Henry Morris) (1980). The Private Presses of San Serriffe. Port Clarendon, San Serriffe: San Serriffe Publishing Company (but actually Newtown, PA: Bird & Bull Press).
- Bachaus, Theodore (pseudonym of Henry Morris) (1988). The first fine silver coinage of the Republic of San Serriffe: the Bird & Bull Press commemorative 100 coronas: including an account of this legendary republic and its connection with the Bird & Bull Press: with description of similar numismatic rarities and a 30-year checklist of work produced by the Press, 1958–1988. Port Clarendon, San Serriffe: San Serriffe Publishing Company (but actually Newtown, PA: Bird & Bull Press).
- Bachaus, Theodore (pseudonym of Henry Morris) (2001). The Booksellers of San Serriffe. Port Clarendon, San Serriffe: San Serriffe Publishing Company (but actually Newtown, PA: Bird & Bull Press).
- Bachaus, Theodore (pseudonym of Henry Morris) (2010). The San Serriffe Postal Service. Port Clarendon, San Serriffe: San Serriffe Publishing Company (but actually Newtown, PA: Bird & Bull Press).
