= Listenbourg =

Fictitious country in Iberia

- Europe with (left) and without (right) Listenbourg
- Created by: Gaspard Hoelscher
- Based on: A joke to test the stereotype of Americans having a lack of knowledge of geography
- Genre: Internet meme

In-universe information
- Type: Fictional country
- Location: Iberian Peninsula, Europe
- Locations: Lurenberg (capital); Flußerde, Kusterde, Mitteland, Adrias, Caséière (regions); Osatri (town)
- Character: Gaspardo (president)
- Population: 59,000,000

Listenbourg is a fictional country created as the subject of an internet meme in October 2022, which depicts it as an extension of the Iberian Peninsula. French Twitter user Gaspard Hoelscher shared a doctored map of Europe with a red arrow pointing to the outline of a pasted country adjacent to Portugal and Spain, and joked that Americans would not be able to name the country.

The nonexistent nation went viral on social networks, with users expanding on the fictional history of the country and some major brands, national politicians, and official organisations playing along with the joke.

== Origin ==
The trend started as an internet meme posted by Gaspard Hoelscher, known as @gaspardooo on Twitter, a French Twitter user intending to test the stereotype of Americans having a poor grasp of European geography. On October 30, 2022, Hoelscher shared a photoshopped map of Europe with an additional landmass attached to the Iberian Peninsula. The post was captioned: "Je suis sûr que les américains ne connaissent même pas le nom de ce pays ptdrrr" (transl. "I'm sure Americans don't even know the name of this country lolol"). Another user responded with the rhetorical question "Qui ne connaît pas le listenbourg?" (transl. "Who does not know Listenbourg?"), giving the hoax its name.

The country's name has been described as sounding like a blend of "Luxembourg" with "Lithuania" and/or "Liechtenstein".

== Viral spread ==
Five regions: Flußerde, Kusterde, Mitteland, Adriàs and Caséière, in Listenbourg. The capital is named Lurenberg.

The joke became a viral phenomenon with other Twitter users offering invented facts about the country, doctored photographs and satellite maps purporting to show aspects of it. Dozens of Twitter accounts claiming to represent Listenbourg government institutions arose in a few days, and people invented a capital, flag, history, national anthem, culture and language for the fictional country.

Several large, verified social media handles joined in on the joke. Participants in the joke attempted to flesh out Listenbourg's existence with detailed social media threads. Collaborative actions established that the country was split up into five regions called Flußerde, Kusterde, Mitteland, Adriàs and Caséière. The population was said to be 59 million. The meme's originator, Gaspardo, was proclaimed president of Listenbourg, although he admitted his prank totally overwhelmed him.

== Responses ==
Major organizations and news channels played along with the hoax, although most of them made clear they were not being serious. On October 31, 2022, the official Paris 2024 Olympics channel tweeted: "The number of Olympic delegations has risen from 206 to 207 with the arrival of Listenbourg". Amazon Prime Video announced that a report on the history of Listenbourg would be released on the impossible date of "February 31". The low-cost carrier Ryanair published the viral map, writing that they were "Proud to be announcing our new base in Listenbourg!"

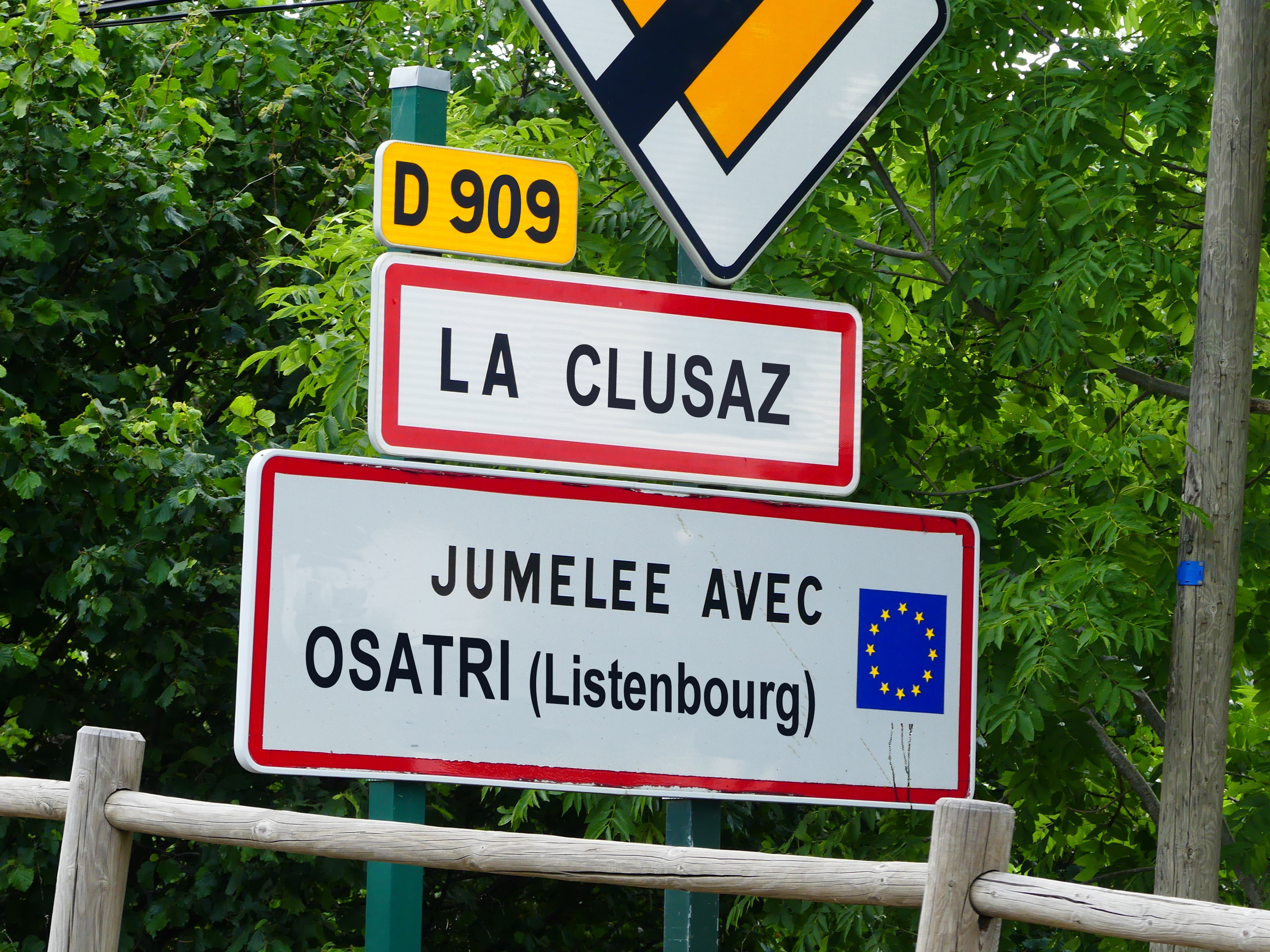
Hoax shared by La Clusaz announcing its twinning with Osatri in Listenbourg

The French television network TF1 presented a realistic weather report for the imaginary country. Toulouse Football Club said its team was going to a training camp in the fictional nation. The prank also reached the Formula 1 Grand Prix, with the Canal+ Sport supporting the sham state. On November 1, 2022, the GPS navigation software company Waze posted in French a tweet of "Le Listenbourg, nous au moins on sait comment y aller!" (transl. "Listenbourg, at least we know how to get there!"). French politician Jean Lassalle pretended to have visited an agricultural festival in Listenbourg. The French city of Nice announced a twinning with Listenbourg's capital, while Nice Airport inaugurated a new air link to the extra chunk of land.

Other brands and organisations that posted about Listenbourg include the French ski resort of La Clusaz, the British online food delivery Deliveroo, the French restaurant chain Buffalo Grill, the Parisian transportation operator RATP Group, the high-speed TGV trains of the SNCF and the French national hockey team.

== See also ==
- Absurdistan
- List of fictional countries
- Molvanîa
- Veyshnoria
- San Escobar
- Ruritania
- Královec Region
- Guiana Brasileira (meme)
- Galicia (Spain), an actual region corresponding to parts of Listenbourg in reality
- Bielefeld conspiracy, a satirical conspiracy theory that claims that the city of Bielefeld, Germany, does not exist
- Goncharov, a fictional film whose details were similarly collaboratively created after going viral
