= Liam Bradley (musician) =

Australian composer

Liam Bradley (born 1943 in Melbourne) was an Australian musician and composer.

== Early life ==
Liam was born into a musical family. His father, Kevin, and his uncles Reg, Leo, and Charles, were all musicians based in Melbourne. His cousin Desmond Bradley was a violinist who went to Paris at the age of 14 to study with George Enescu. Desmond also played with the well-known violinists Yehudi Menuhin and his sister Hephzibah Menuhin on their visits to Australia. When Liam was 10 the Bradley family moved from Melbourne to Belgrave in the Dandenongs. Justus Jorgensen who established the artist colony at Montsalvat was a family friend as was the sculptor William Ricketts and other musicians and artists. This childhood environment lead to Liam's early success as a violinist and later as a composer.

Recognising that music did not guarantee an income, Liam took on a job as an apprentice radiographer at St Vincent's Hospital, Melbourne, graduating at the age of 18.

As a young adult Liam was a member of several early Melbourne bands including The Gingerbread Revue.

== Compositions ==
Liam is known for his music for the television series A River Somewhere, which was produced by Working Dog Productions and screened on ABC, Australia.

This was a 13-part adventure travel series which was produced from 1997 to 1998. In each episode Rob Sitch and Tom Gleisner search the world for rivers and waterways where they can catch dinner and have it cooked in a local style. Liam Bradley composed the music for each episode. The music from the series was also released on a CD.

Throughout his life, he continued to write music for documentaries and advertising.

== Death ==
Liam died on 30 January 2024 in his home town of Mansfield, Victoria, where he had worked as a radiographer for 30 years.
