= List of fictional states =

List of fictional states; may refer to:

- List of fictional countries on the Earth
- List of fictional countries by region
- -stan#Fictional
