= Candy Kingdom =

Candy Kingdom may refer to:

- a line of the Groovy Girls dolls
- the setting of Candy Land § Gameplay
- fictional kingdom in the Adventure Time television franchise

== See also ==
- List of fictional countries
- Candy Canyon Kingdom, fictional kingdom in the animated web series The Amazing Digital Circus
- Kingdom of Kandy, a monarchy on the island of Sri Lanka 1469–1815
