= Lists of fictional locations =

Following are lists of fictional locations, as large as a universe and as small as a pub.

- List of fictional bars and pubs
- List of fictional castles
- List of fictional city-states in literature
- List of fictional countries set on Earth
  - List of fictional countries by region
    - List of fictional African countries
    - List of fictional Asian countries
    - List of fictional European countries
    - List of fictional Oceanian countries
- List of fictional galactic communities
- List of fictional islands
- List of fictional police states
- List of fictional railway stations
- List of fictional rapid transit stations
- List of fictional schools
  - List of fictional universities
    - List of fictional Cambridge colleges
    - List of fictional Oxford colleges
- List of fictional settlements
  - List of fictional towns in animation
  - List of fictional towns in comics
  - List of fictional towns in film
  - List of fictional towns in literature
  - List of fictional towns in television
- List of films featuring space stations
- List of fictional universes in animation and comics
- List of fictional shared universes in film and television
- List of fictional universes in literature
- List of fantasy worlds
- List of science fiction universes

== See also ==
- Constructed world
- Extrasolar planets in fiction
- Fictional geography
- Lost lands
