= TV Acres =

Website established by Jerome Holst

TV Acres' official logo

TV Acres was a website collecting information about characters, places, and things that have appeared on American television programs broadcast from the 1940s through today. The website and its publishing imprint, TV Acres Books, was established by Jerome Holst, a former librarian who now lives in Stockport, Ohio. The website was named a "hot site" by USA Today in 2003.
