= Molvanîa =

2003 Australian parody travel guide

- Author: Santo Cilauro; Tom Gleisner; Rob Sitch
- Language: English
- Subject: Fictional country
- Genre: Travel, comedy
- Publisher: Jetlag Travel
- Publication date: November 2003 (Australia)
- Publication place: Australia
- Media type: Hardcover
- Pages: 176
- ISBN: 978-1-74066-110-2
- OCLC: 56672262
- Dewey Decimal: A827.4 21
- LC Class: PN6231.T7 C55 2003
- Followed by: Phaic Tăn

Molvanîa
- Molvanîa: a Land Untouched by Modern Dentistry location
- Created by: Santo Cilauro, Tom Gleisner, Rob Sitch
- Genre: Parody

In-universe information
- Other name: Republic of Molvanîa
- Type: Dictatorship
- Locations: Lutenblag (Lutnblaag) (capital)
- Language(s): Molvanian
- Currency: Strubl (100 Qunts)

Flag of Molvania

Molvanîa (subtitled A Land Untouched by Modern Dentistry) is a book parodying travel guides. The guide describes the fictional country Molvanîa, a post-Soviet state, a nation described as "the birthplace of the whooping cough" and "owner of Europe's oldest nuclear reactor". It was created by Australians Tom Gleisner, Santo Cilauro and Rob Sitch (locally known in Australia for television shows The D-Generation, The Late Show and The Panel, and films The Castle and The Dish). Along with the other Jetlag Travel volumes, 2004's Phaic Tăn and 2006's San Sombrèro, the book parodies both the language of heritage tourism and the legacy of colonialism and imperialism. Keith Vaz criticised the book for exploiting prejudices.

== History ==
The book became a surprise success after its initial publication in Australia, sparking a bidding war for the international publication rights. Qantas has even run the half-hour video segment produced in association with the book on its international flights.

Following its success, a follow-up book was published: Traditional Molvanîan Baby Names: With Meanings, Derivations and Probable Pronunciations.

== Plot ==
The Republic of Molvanîa is a composite of stereotypes and clichés about former Eastern Bloc and post-Soviet states. Its name is a portmanteau of Moldova and Romania. Molvanîa is located "somewhere between Romania and downwind from Chernobyl". The book hints at Bulgarians, Hungarians, and Moldovans as its inhabitants: "The Molvanian population is made up of three major ethnic groups: the Bulgs (68%) who live predominantly in the centre and south, the Hungars (29%) who inhabit the northern cities, and the Molvs (3%) who can be found mainly in prison."

The book describes the nation as having been a desolate barren wasteland for much of its history, torn by civil war and ethnic unrest. Eventually Molvanîa's various warring factions were united as a single kingdom, ruled by a series of cruel despotic kings. In the late 19th century the monarchy was overthrown, but the royal family remained popular in exile. During World War II the country was allied with Nazi Germany, and then afterwards was occupied by the Soviet Union, who set up a Communist puppet government. After the fall of European Communism in the 1990s, the country became a dictatorship run by a corrupt government with heavy ties to the mafia.

Molvanîa is described as a very poor and rural country, heavily polluted and geographically barren. The infrastructure is terrible, with necessities such as electricity, clean water, and indoor plumbing being rare finds, largely due to bureaucratic incompetence. There is little to do in the country; the hotels are tiny, filthy and dilapidated, the ethnic cuisine disgusting, and the "tourist attractions" boring and overpriced.

The Molvanîan people are portrayed as being generally rude, dirty, and at times slightly psychotic, with numerous bizarre and illogical beliefs and traditions. The country's patron saint is Fyodor.

The fictional Molvanîan language is said to be so complicated that it takes an average of 16 years to learn. Not only is the tone in which one speaks important to the meaning, but also the pitch. It is a gendered language, with different articles being used depending on whether a noun is masculine, feminine, neutral, or a type of cheese. There are language schools for tourists to attend, which are described by the book as a "waste of time".

== Flag ==
The flag of Molvanîa is called the "Trikolor" despite the fact it contains only two colours: red and yellow. During the Soviet occupation, the flag had a yellow hammer and sickle in the top left corner. After the fall of communism, Molvanîa became one of the few ex-Soviet states to retain the hammer and sickle, but added a trowel into the symbol.

== Criticism ==
The book was criticised by the United Kingdom's former Minister for Europe Keith Vaz, who accused it of exploiting prejudice. Vaz said the book was a little "cheeky" because "it does reflect some of the prejudices which are taking root [in Europe]. He [Mr Gleisner] does try and show exactly where we are lacking in our knowledge; the sad thing is, some people might actually believe that this country exists."

== See also ==
- Elbonia
- Lower Slobbovia
- Ruritania
- Zladko Vladcik
- Syldavia
