= A River Somewhere =

Australian documentary television series

- Genre: Documentary
- Developed by: Working Dog
- Directed by: Tom Gleisner; Rob Sitch
- Presented by: Tom Gleisner; Rob Sitch
- Opening theme: Liam Bradley
- Country of origin: Australia
- Original language: English
- No. of episodes: 13

Production
- Executive producers: Santo Cilauro, Tom Gleisner, Michael Hirsh, Jane Kennedy, Rob Sitch
- Producer: Debra Choate
- Running time: 27 minutes
- Production company: Working Dog Productions

Original release
- Network: ABC TV
- Release: 25 June 1997 – 16 September 1998

A River Somewhere is an Australian documentary television series originally broadcast by ABC TV in 1997 and 1998. It was produced by Working Dog Productions, and was hosted by Tom Gleisner and Rob Sitch. The series was released on DVD in 2005.

The series focused on the observations of Sitch and Gleisner as they travelled to various locations across Australia, New Zealand and around the world to fly fish and experience the local culture. The aim of their expedition was to "catch dinner and have it cooked in a local style".

The music used throughout the series was created by Australian musician and composer Liam Bradley.

== Places visited in the series ==
- Howqua River, Victoria – 25 June 1997
- Cotswolds, England and Altnaharra, Scotland – 2 July 1997
- D'Urville River, New Zealand – 9 July 1997
- Chamberlain River, Western Australia – 16 July 1997
- Los Roques Archipelago, Venezuela – 23 July 1997
- Courmayeur, Italy – 30 July 1997
- Valle D’Aosta, Italy – 5 August 1998
- Cobungra River, Victoria – 12 August 1998
- Wyoming, United States of America – 19 August 1998
- Yarraki (Olive) River, Queensland – 26 August 1998
- Tongariro River, New Zealand – 2 September 1998
- Turneffe Islands, Belize – 9 September 1998
- Calcutta, India and Bhutan – 16 September 1998
