= Tom Gleisner =

Australian comedian and producer

Tom Gleisner AO
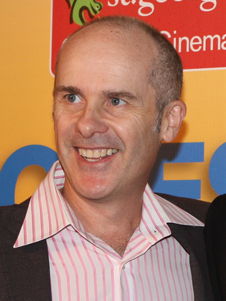
- Gleisner in 2012
- Born: Thomas Edmund Gleisner; 24 October 1962 (age 63); Melbourne, Victoria, Australia
- Education: University of Melbourne
- Occupations: Comedian; producer; writer; director; actor; author; television presenter
- Years active: 1980s–present
- Known for: Co-founder of Working Dog Productions
- Notable work: The D-Generation (writer)
- Television: Have You Been Paying Attention?
- Children: 2

Thomas Edmund Gleisner AO (born 24 October 1962) is an Australian comedian and producer, writer and TV personality. Gleisner co-founded production company Working Dog Productions and currently hosts Network 10's Have You Been Paying Attention?.

== Early life and education ==
Gleisner was educated at Xavier College in Melbourne, Australia. He attended the University of Melbourne in the 1980s, and graduated with a Bachelor of Arts and Bachelor of Laws in 1987. While he was a university student he began working with Santo Cilauro and Rob Sitch in the 1983 Law Revue Legal A.I.D.S. Gleisner wrote and performed in the 1985 Melbourne University Revue Too Cool for Sandals.

== Television, radio, and film ==
Gleisner was credited as a writer on The D-Generation (1986–1987) but not as a regular performer. He did, however, appear on numerous occasions as a guest star (he featured more prominently in the second season), and on the album The Satanic Sketches.

Gleisner went on to perform in the D-Gen's late-eighties Triple M radio show (and its spin-off album The Breakfast Tapes), and then starred in, and wrote for, ABC TV's The Late Show (1992–1993). His best-remembered performances in The Late Show included the newsreader of Late Show News, the co-host of Countdown Classics with Jane Kennedy and the interviewer of stuntman Rob Sitch in Shitscared, although he appeared in various other sketches (including a recurring role as brainless bush-traveller "Wallaby Jack").

After The Late Show finished, Gleisner co-founded Working Dog Productions, along with Santo Cilauro, Jane Kennedy and Rob Sitch. Their first venture was Frontline which ran on the ABC from 1994 until 1997. Gleisner was a writer/producer/director, and also had a minor role as photocopier repairman Colin Konica.

In 1995, Gleisner starred as mute cop Poncho on Funky Squad on ABC, another Working Dog comedy which he co-created and served on as a writer/producer/directors. Gleisner co-wrote the Working Dog films The Castle (1997), The Dish (2000) and Any Questions for Ben? (2012). He also hosted and co-executive produced the popular Network Ten program The Panel (1998–2004). Gleisner has also appeared with Rob Sitch as a presenter of the ABC TV fly-fishing documentary A River Somewhere (1997–1998). He wrote and directed the Glenn Robbins comedy, All Aussie Adventures (2001–2002, 2004, 2018), was the judge on the improvised comedy program Thank God You're Here from 2006 to 2009, but was replaced by various judges from 2023, and co-wrote/co-produced Working Dog's The Hollowmen (2008), Utopia (2014–2023), and Pacific Heat (2016).

Currently he is host of the popular Australian quiz show Have You Been Paying Attention? (2013–present). He is also a producer of The Cheap Seats (2021–present).

== Works ==
Gleisner has written four comedic books in the persona of a fictitious cricketer Warwick Todd. He has appeared as his Warwick Todd persona in guest appearances on TV.

- The Warwick Todd Diaries (1997, ABC Books)
- Warwick Todd: Back in the Baggy Green (1998, ABC Books)
- Warwick Todd Goes The Tonk (2001, ABC Books)
- Warwick Todd – Up in the Block Hole (2009, Hardie Grant Books)

Gleisner has also written a number of fly fishing books along with Rob Sitch. He also wrote the Jetlag Travel Guide series alongside Rob Sitch and Santo Cilauro.

- Molvanîa: A Land Untouched by Modern Dentistry (2004, Hardie Grant Books)
- Phaic Tăn: Sunstroke on a Shoestring (2006, Hardie Grant Books)
- San Sombrèro: A Land of Carnivals, Cocktails and Coups (2006, Hardie Grant Books)

== Theatre ==
With Cilauro and Sitch, Gleisner co-wrote the comic play The Speechmaker, which the Melbourne Theatre Company premiered in 2014.

In 2023, Gleisner wrote the musical comedy Bloom, inspired after witnessing his father, mother-in-law, and father-in-law enter aged care institutions. He was also inspired by Alison Bechdel's Fun Home. Katie Weston composed and Dean Bryant directed. The musical premiered at the Melbourne Theatre Company in July 2023 and centers around a music student who stays at a Melbourne aged care facility in exchange for care work.

== Personal life ==
Gleisner is married to Mary Muirhead and they have two children, a son and a daughter.

Gleisner is the chairman of Challenge, an Australian cancer support organisation.

He is also passionate about raising autism awareness, co-founding Learning For Life, a centre that provides early intervention to autistic children, with his wife in 2004. They were inspired to do so by the child of a friend of theirs.
