= Rob Sitch =

Australian film director and comedian (born 1962)

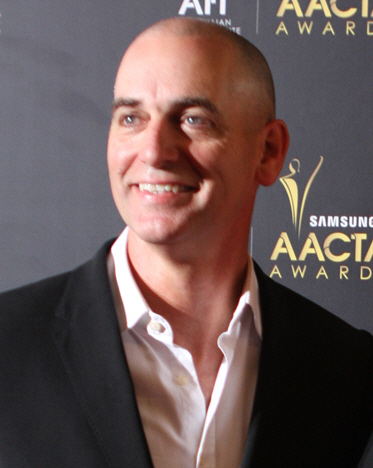
- Sitch at the AACTA Awards, January 2012
- Born: Robert Ian Sitch; 17 March 1962 (age 64); Melbourne, Victoria, Australia
- Education: University of Melbourne
- Occupations: Actor; director; producer; writer
- Spouse: Jane Kennedy
- Children: 5

Robert Ian Sitch (born 17 March 1962) is an Australian filmmaker, actor and comedian. He directed and co-wrote the comedy films The Castle (1997) and The Dish (2000); the former of which is often considered one of the greatest Australian films ever made. On television, he is known for the 1990s comedy series Frontline and the long-running comedy series Utopia (2014–present).

== Early life and education ==
Sitch graduated as a medical doctor from the University of Melbourne, and practised medicine for a short time.

== Career ==
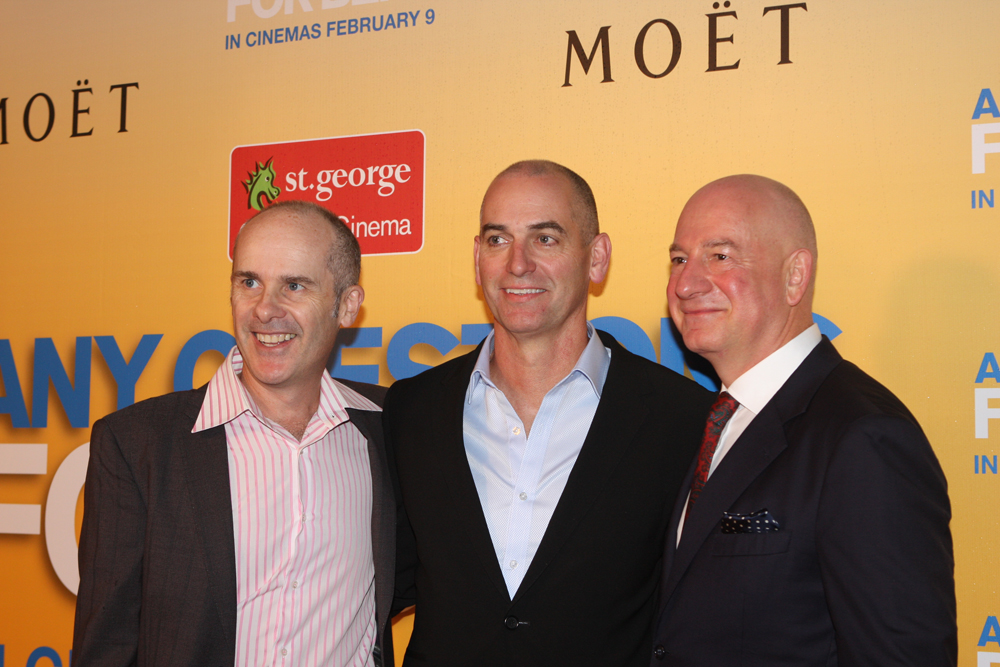
Tom Gleisner (left), Rob Sitch (middle) and Michael Hirsh at the 2012 Sydney premiere of Any Questions for Ben?

Sitch is a member of the Working Dog production company, which has produced the television shows Frontline, A River Somewhere, The Panel, Thank God You're Here, and Utopia, as well as the feature films The Castle, The Dish, and Any Questions for Ben?. Sitch co-wrote and directed each of these films.

In 2006, to mark 50 years of television in Australia, the Nine Network special 50 Years 50 Stars listed Sitch at the 39th greatest living television star in Australia. Several of his programs, including The D-Generation and Frontline, were included in the earlier special, 50 Years 50 Shows, coming in at 50 and 22 respectively.

Sitch is also a co-author of the satirical Jetlag travel guides to Molvanîa, Phaic Tăn, and San Sombrèro.

== Filmography ==
=== Films ===
Year	Production	Credited as				
Year	Production	Director	Producer	Writer	Actor	Other
1997	The Castle	Yes	No	Yes	No	
2000	The Dish	Yes	No	Yes	No	
2003	Bad Eggs	No	No	No	No	Special thanks
2012	Kath & Kimderella	No	No	No	Yes	
2012	Any Questions for Ben?	Yes	Yes	Yes	Yes	

=== Television ===
Year(s)	Television show	Credited as			
Year(s)	Television show	Director	Producer	Writer	Actor
1986–1987	The D-Generation	No	Yes	Yes	Yes
1988–89	The D-Generation: Goes Commercial	No	Yes	Yes	Yes
1989	Midday	No	No	No	Yes
1991	Turn It Up	No	No	No	Yes
1992–93	The Late Show	Yes	Yes	Yes	Yes
1993	The Olden Days	No	No	No	Yes
1993	Bargearse	No	No	No	Yes
1994–97	Frontline	Yes	Yes	Yes	Yes
1995	Funky Squad	Yes	Yes	Yes	Yes
1996	The Campaign	No	Yes	No	No
1997	A River Somewhere	Yes	No	Yes	Yes
1998–2007	The Panel	No	Yes	No	Yes
2000	Numero Bruno	No	No	No	Yes
2001–02	Russell Coight's All Aussie Adventures	No	No	Yes	No
2004	Russell Coight's Celebrity Challenge	No	Yes	Yes	No
2006–09	Thank God You're Here	Yes	Yes	Yes	Yes
2007	Kath & Kim	No	No	No	Yes
2008	The Hollowmen	Yes	Yes	Yes	Yes
2010	Santo, Sam and Ed's Cup Fever!	No	Yes	Yes	Yes
2010	Lowdown: Zirco Goes Berko	No	No	No	Yes
2011	A Quiet Word With ...	No	No	No	Yes
2012	Pictures of You	No	Yes	No	No
2012	Santo, Sam and Ed's Sports Fever!	No	Yes	Yes	Yes
2012	Adam Hills in Gordon Street Tonight	No	No	No	Yes
2012–13	Audrey's Kitchen	No	Yes	No	No
2013–15	Santo, Sam and Ed's Total Football	No	No	Yes	Yes
2013–present	Have You Been Paying Attention?	No	Yes	No	No
2014–present	Utopia	Yes	Yes	Yes	Yes
2016–17	Pacific Heat	Yes	Yes	Yes	Yes

=== Albums ===
- The D-Generation: The Satanic Sketches (1989)
- The D-Generation: The Breakfast Tapes (1990)

=== Theatre ===
- The Castle (2027)

== Personal life ==
Sitch is married to fellow Australian comedian Jane Kennedy. They have five children, including Joshua Sitch, who starred in ABC's Little Lunch.
