= The Dish =

- Theatrical release poster
- Directed by: Rob Sitch
- Written by: Santo Cilauro; Tom Gleisner; Jane Kennedy; Rob Sitch
- Produced by: Santo Cilauro; Tom Gleisner; Michael Hirsh; Jane Kennedy; Rob Sitch
- Starring: Sam Neill; Kevin Harrington; Tom Long; Patrick Warburton
- Cinematography: Graeme Wood
- Edited by: Jill Bilcock
- Music by: Edmund Cho
- Production companies: Summit Entertainment; Distant Horizon; Working Dog; Dish Film Productions
- Distributed by: Roadshow Entertainment
- Release dates: 15 September 2000 (TIFF); 19 October 2000 (Australia)
- Running time: 101 minutes
- Country: Australia
- Language: English
- Box office: $18 million (Australia)

The Dish is a 2000 Australian historical comedy-drama film that tells the story of the Parkes Observatory's role in relaying live television of humanity's first steps on the Moon during the Apollo 11 mission in 1969. It was the top-grossing Australian film in 2000.

== Plot ==
An old man drives up to the Parkes Radio Telescope to admire the dish. A technician gently cautions him that he has driven in through "the old entrance" and is therefore trespassing. Requesting that the man leave immediately, the technician encourages him to visit the observatory's nearby visitor centre and take the tour, as the dish has seen some amazing times. The old man thoughtfully agrees.

The movie flashes back to July 1969, days before the launch of Apollo 11. NASA anticipates using the dish as a primary receiving antenna for the video transmission of Neil Armstrong's historic first steps on the Moon. The dish's staff, Mitch, Glenn, and their boss, Cliff (the old man from the prologue) have been assigned a liaison by NASA, Al Burnett. Mitch resents Al, as he feels that Al is condescending; and that his presence likewise reflects a wider perception among NASA that the Australians are incompetent and unreliable. Cliff chastises Mitch for his hostility, explaining that Al's presence is justified, and that he and NASA merely want to ensure that the Moon landing proceeds as smoothly as possible.

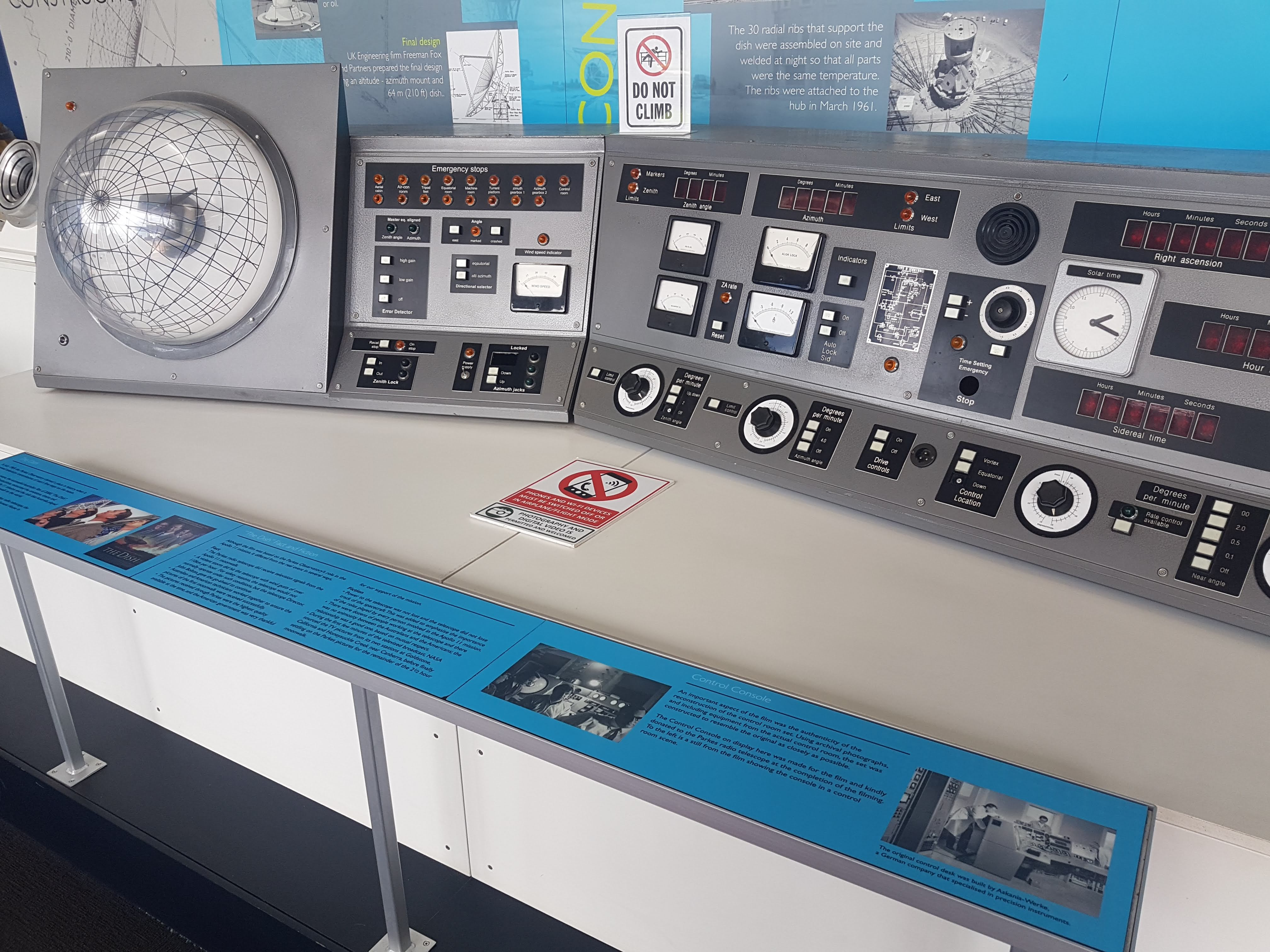
Specially constructed 'control console' as used on the set of the film. As on public display at the CSIRO Parkes Observatory visitors' centre, March 2020.

The major role that the dish is set to play in the Moon landing draws great interest upon the sleepy town of Parkes from major dignitaries, including the U.S. Ambassador and the Prime Minister. Parkes mayor, Bob, is delighted, as he played a key role in securing the dish's construction at Parkes, and thus the dish's prominent role in the Moon landing will be a boon to his political career.

A power cut strikes Parkes. The dish's backup generator fails, as Mitch had previously conducted a maintenance procedure on it incorrectly. When the mains power returns, the station's tracking computers have been wiped of all their programming, and the dish can no longer locate Command Module Columbia's signal in space. Houston notices that they are no longer receiving any information from the Parkes station and queries them about the problem. Fearing that NASA may demote the team's role in the Moon landing if it learns of the mistake, Cliff falsely responds that the dish is receiving a clear signal from the spacecraft. Al reluctantly corroborates the lie. Mitch confesses his own culpability to Al, who immediately forgives him, mending their strained relationship. The four men work together to try to relocate Apollo 11's signal. After several hours and mishaps, they are able to lock on to the spacecraft's signal with minutes to spare before their scheduled shift as Apollo 11's main receiver begins, thus ensuring their mistake has gone undiscovered.

After the Lunar Module Eagle makes a successful landing upon the Moon, Cliff notes with concern that the wind seems unusually strong. Regulations state that if the wind reaches 30 knots, the dish must be "stowed", meaning it can not be pointed at the Moon, and thus will not be able to receive Eagle's video broadcasts. Events conspire such that the Parkes dish becomes the only antenna on Earth capable of receiving the historic video footage of Armstrong's first steps upon the Moon.

The wind reaches and exceeds 30 knots. Despite risking the total collapse of the dish, and therefore, their own lives, all four members of the dish team opt to keep the dish pointed at the Moon, adamant that allowing the world to witness and record the first moonwalk is worth the risk.

The world watches in silent awe as man sets foot upon the Moon. As the Prime Minister, the ambassador, and Parkes dignitaries watch the moonwalk together, Bob is informed that the video feed is coming from the dish. Everybody is delighted, and the Prime Minister toasts Parkes. As the moonwalk concludes, the dish staff congratulate one another.

Back in the present day, the technician once again insists that Cliff must leave. Cliff solemnly takes one last look at the dish before returning to his car. Before he leaves, the technician remarks that Cliff seems familiar, suggesting that Cliff's legacy is immortalised within the observatory's visitor centre.

A title card explains that the dish withstood winds of over 60 mph (52 knots) to deliver the video footage of man walking on the Moon.

== Cast ==
- Sam Neill as Cliff Buxton
- Patrick Warburton as Al Burnett
- Tom Long as Glenn Latham
- Kevin Harrington as Ross 'Mitch' Mitchell
- Roy Billing as Mayor Robert 'Bob' McIntyre
- Eliza Szonert as Janine Kellerman
- Tayler Kane as Rudi Kellerman
- Billy Mitchell as Cameron
- Roz Hammond as Miss Nolan
- John McMartin as U.S. Ambassador
- Christopher-Robin Street as Damien
- Luke Keltie as Graeme
- Naomi Wright as Melanie
- Ben Wright-Smith as Nicholas
- Grant Thompson as Mr. Callen
- Bille Brown as the Prime Minister (unnamed, but John Gorton at the time)
- Lenka Kripac as Marie McIntyre
- Neil Pigot as John, the newspaper reporter
- Frank Bennett as Barry Steele
- Carl Snell as Billy McIntyre
- Bud Tingwell as Reverend Loftus
- Kerry Walker as Pearl
- Denise Roberts as Bronwyn

== Production ==
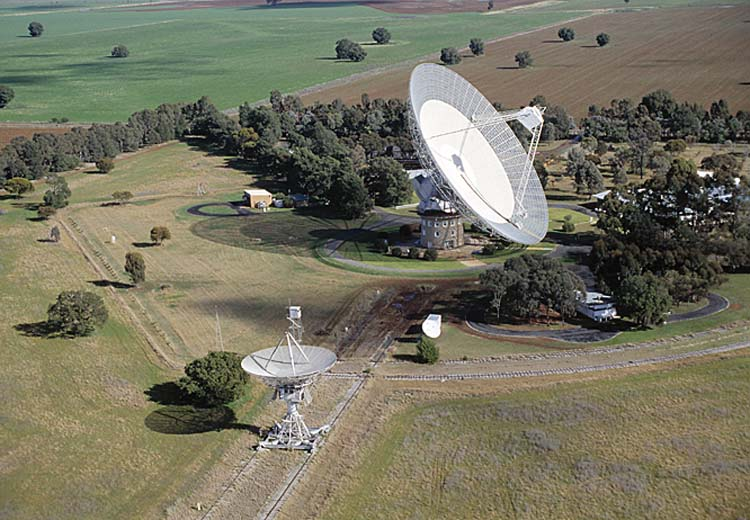
The Parkes 64-metre radio telescope at the Parkes Observatory in New South Wales, Australia (the bigger of the two)

ABC news report on the role of the Parkes radio telescope and the Honeysuckle Creek Tracking Station, broadcast a week before the Moon landing

Much of the film was shot on location; the "cricket match" and "hayride" scenes were shot on the real dish and researchers often postponed experiments to position the dish for photography. The set reconstructing the 1969 control room was extremely accurate, down to some details as small as ashtrays. Some of the "props" were in fact original NASA equipment used during the Apollo 11 landing, left behind in Australia as they were too heavy (i.e. too expensive) to ship back to the U.S. Staff from that era expressed amazement at seeing the set; they said it was like stepping through a time warp.

The Dish was written by Santo Cilauro, Tom Gleisner, Jane Kennedy and Rob Sitch, and directed by Sitch.

== Historical accuracy ==
Although the film is based on actual events, it uses fictional characters and alters historical details for dramatic effect. NASA's Honeysuckle Creek near Canberra and the Goldstone station in California both had the signal first, but Parkes' signal was used eight and a half minutes after the beginning of the moonwalk. Armstrong's first step on the Moon and his words, "That's one small step for man, one giant leap for mankind", were received on Earth by the Honeysuckle Creek antenna. No power failure occurred, there was no friction with the NASA representatives (of whom there were not just one but several), and Prime Minister John Gorton visited Honeysuckle Creek, not Parkes. They did, however, operate in very high winds gusting to 110 km/h (68 mph) (59 knots) at 60 degrees inclination, risking damage to the dish and even injury to themselves to keep the antenna pointed at the Moon during the moonwalk.

== Box office ==
The Dish had three days of paid previews prior to its official opening in Australia on 19 October 2000. During its official opening (four-day) weekend, it had a record opening weekend for an Australian film with gross of $2.98 million from 281 screens. Including the previews, its gross was $4.3 million (US$2.25 million). It went on to gross $17,999,473 at the box office in Australia, and was the top grossing Australian film in Australia in 2000.

== Reception ==
On the review aggregator Rotten Tomatoes, the film holds a 96% approval rating based on 99 reviews, with an average rating of 7.4/10. The website's critics consensus reads: "A feel good movie without an abundance of mush." Metacritic, which uses a weighted average, assigned the film a score of 74 out of 100, based on 27 critics, indicating "generally favorable" reviews.

== See also ==
- Cinema of Australia
- Apollo 11 in popular culture
