= San Sombrèro =

Fictituous travel guide book

- San Sombrèro: a Land of Carnivals, Cocktails and Coups
- Author: Tom Gleisner; Santo Cilauro; Rob Sitch
- Illustrators: Michèle Burch, Bettina Guthridge
- Language: English
- Subject: Fictional country
- Genre: Travel; comedy
- Publisher: Jetlag Travel
- Publication date: October 2006
- Publication place: Australia
- Pages: 200
- ISBN: 1-74066-385-3
- Preceded by: Phaic Tăn

San Sombrèro
- San Sombrèro: a Land of Carnivals, Cocktails and Coups location
- General location of San Sombrèro
- Created by: Tom Gleisner; Santo Cilauro; Rob Sitch
- Genre: Parody

In-universe information
- Other name: Democratic Free People’s United Republic of San Sombrèro Repùblica Unida de Pueblo Libre Democráticos de San Sombrèro
- Type: Republic
- Ethnic groups: Spanish, African, Indigenous
- Locations: Cucaracha City (capital)
- Population: 8.6 million (est.)
- Anthem: O Patria Gloriosa (English: O Glorious Motherland)
- Language(s): San Sombrèran Spanish
- Currency: Crapeso (100 Cachingos)

San Sombrèro (subtitled A Land of Carnivals, Cocktails and Coups) is a parody travel guide examining the eponymous fictional country, described as the birthplace of tinted sunglasses and sequins. This country is set in Central America, and was created by Australian comedic writers Tom Gleisner, Santo Cilauro and Rob Sitch (of The D-Generation and The Panel fame). Along with the other Jetlag Travel volumes, 2003's Molvanîa and 2004's Phaic Tăn, the book parodies both the language of heritage tourism and the legacy of colonialism and imperialism.

According to the book the "full and technically correct" name of San Sombrèro is "the Democratic Free People's United Republic of San Sombrèro", and citizens may be arrested, without a warrant, if the title is not used.

== Background ==
San Sombrèro was written by Tom Gleisner, Santo Cilauro, and Rob Sitch. It is the third book in the Jet Lag series after the parody books Molvanîa and Phaic Tăn. All three books are about fictional countries.

== About San Sombrèro ==
The "Democratic Free People’s United Republic of San Sombrèro" is a composite of many stereotypes and clichés about Central America and South America. It would be difficult to position the fictional San Sombèro on a map of Central America. Although it is presented as a thin country between the Pacific Ocean and the Caribbean Sea (similar to Panama), it runs diagonally from northeast to southwest, in comparison to the other states on the Central American strip of land that run more from the northwest to southeast, or west to east. If San Sombrèro were to be geographically placed it would probably fit best between Panama and Costa Rica.

The book says the nation has "362 separate public holidays (not including the 'carnivale' long weekend)". San Sombrèro appears to be a stereotypically corrupt and unstable banana republic with seemingly everlasting revolutions and counter-revolutions. The country is said to have had 17 different presidents over 10 years.

San Sombrèro is described as having a very high literacy rate because of an anti-illiteracy campaign in which "over 53,000 citizens who were unable to read [were] jailed or deported to Haiti".

Before the arrival of the Spanish, San Sombrèro was said to inhabited by several "Amer-Indian" ethnic groups, called the "Ciboney" (Siboney) (Nomadic hunter-gatherers), "Taino" (who lived on seafood), "Puorcina" (who practiced simple agriculture) and the most dominant "Guanajaxo" (they just stole from everyone else). But there was a tribe that existed before called the "Bollivquar", fierce warriors who regarded themselves as a very complex and advanced society, which is said to be odd because they "never quite" mastered fire, irrigation or star jumps. But they learnt how to farm tobacco, which to this day still remains a part of the Bollivquar diet, explaining their stunted growth. Note that their inability to light a fire made it harder to take up smoking.

=== Language ===
San Sombrèro is a Spanish-speaking country, but a dialect has developed known as San Sombrèran, which combines Castilian grammar, Portuguese pronunciation, and indigenous shouting. San Sombrèran Spanish is spoken a lot faster than normal Spanish, because it is considered impolite for people to take a breath during a sentence (particularly since their breath is so foul). San Sombrèran Spanish has many English loanwords, some of which are "beisbol" – baseball, "hamburgesa" – hamburger (these two are actual Spanish words), "beeras" – beers, and "dryvebyshooting" – drive-by shooting.

=== National anthem ===
The San Sombrèran national anthem is "O Patria Gloriosa" (O Glorious Motherland), written in 1853 by independence leader Juan Robirro, who is famous for uttering "He who loves his country, lives forever" shortly before falling off a ladder and dying. The national anthem is set to a bossa nova beat, and loyal citizens of San Sombrèro will stand respectfully, place a hand on each hip and start to gyrate while the anthem is played.

- A verse

My baby melts my heart
My baby drives me nuts
The way she swings her hips
The way her hair hangs down
Give me a kiss,
O gorgeous woman
Cover my lips
In passionate bliss
Long live San Sombrèro
O glorious fatherland.

=== Flag ===
The flag of San Sombrèro is the "Camouflagio", which resembles military camouflage, with a narrow vertical white stripe on the left side. When the nation first became independent from Spain, a dirty red-and-white chequered tablecloth made an impromptu flag.

=== Regions ===
There are five provinces in San Sombrèro:

- Polluçión (Capital: Cucaracha City, also national capital)
- Maracca (Capital: San Pistachio)
- Guacomala (Capital: Fumarole)
- Lambarda (Capital: Aguazura)
- San Abandonio (Capital: Nicotiño)

=== Fictional travel guides ===
The book advertises (fictional) guides on the following places: Unaudited Arab Emirates (the Middle East), Costa Lottsa (akin to Monaco), the Barbituros Islands (the Caribbean), Alpenstein (the Alps), Tyranistan (Former Soviet Union), Nuku'la Atoll (Polynesia), frozen Norgborg (Scandinavia), and the miserable Isle of Fogg (North Sea). It also advertises its website's forum, as well as world tours for botanists and golfers, and an opportunity to spend a year in an untouched part of Europe.

The book ends with The Jetlag Story.

== Reception ==
Writing in Journeys, Benjamin Fraser called the book "a tantalising platter of tropicalizations, exoticized culinary fixations, superficial politico-economic analyses and a hefty dose of feel-good in-group reinforcement". A The New Zealand Herald writer said, "I don't think it's quite as funny as its predecessors—though that may be because having chuckled my way through both I knew what to expect—but it's still a delight to read."

Katie Owen of The Sunday Telegraph praised the book, calling it "a hilarious spoof travel guide to a fictional Central American country". She said, "Extremely lightheartedly, it satirises eco- and adventure-travellers and the way many guides gloss over negative aspects of a place." The Sydney Morning Herald's Words Mark Chipperfield called the book "totally hilarious", finding "even the contributor profiles [to be] funny".

== See also ==
- Phaic Tăn
- Molvanîa
- San Escobar
