= Proposed country =

Proposed countries may refer to:

- List of proposed state mergers
- Lists of active separatist movements
- List of historical separatist movements
