= The Castle (1997 Australian film) =

1997 Australian film by Rob Sitch

- DVD cover (Australian release, same artwork as theatrical poster and VHS cover)
- Directed by: Rob Sitch
- Written by: Santo Cilauro; Tom Gleisner; Jane Kennedy; Rob Sitch
- Produced by: Debra Choate
- Starring: Michael Caton; Anne Tenney; Stephen Curry; Anthony Simcoe; Sophie Lee; Wayne Hope; (see cast)
- Narrated by: Stephen Curry
- Cinematography: Miriana Marusic
- Edited by: Wayne Hyett
- Music by: Craig Harnath
- Production company: Working Dog Productions
- Distributed by: Roadshow Entertainment
- Release date: 10 April 1997
- Running time: 84 minutes
- Country: Australia
- Language: English
- Budget: A$750,000
- Box office: A$11 million

The Castle is a 1997 Australian comedy film directed by Rob Sitch, and written by Sitch, Santo Cilauro, Tom Gleisner and Jane Kennedy of Working Dog Productions. The film stars Michael Caton, Anne Tenney, Stephen Curry, Anthony Simcoe, Sophie Lee, and Wayne Hope as the Kerrigan family, as well as Tiriel Mora, Robyn Nevin, Eric Bana (in his film debut), Costas Kilias, and longtime collaborator Charles "Bud" Tingwell.

Shot in 11 days on a budget of approximately A$750,000, on its cinema release in Australia on 10 April 1997, it grossed A$10,326,428 at the box office. The Castle gained widespread acclaim in Australia, where it is still considered one of the greatest Australian films ever made. It was nominated for several awards, winning the AACTA Award for Best Original Screenplay. The film was only released in the US two years later, in May 1999, to generally positive reviews. It continues to be studied as a text in secondary schools in Australia.

A stage adaptation of the film, written by Sitch, Gleisner, Cilauro, and Kennedy, is set to premiere in Melbourne in March 2027.

== Plot ==
The Kerrigan home, in the outer Melbourne blue-collar suburb of Coolaroo, is filled with love as well as pride in their modest lifestyle, but their happiness is threatened when developers attempt the compulsory acquisition of their house to expand the neighbouring airport.

The Kerrigan house is built in a largely undeveloped housing tract, on a toxic landfill, and directly adjacent to an airport runway. Despite all this, sweet-natured family patriarch Darryl (Michael Caton) believes that he lives in the lap of luxury. He busies himself by driving a tow truck, racing greyhounds, and constantly adding (and only half-finishing) renovations to the house. The rest of the Kerrigan clan shares and supports his enthusiasm in every way.

One day, a property valuer arrives to inspect the house. Though he has no wish to sell, Darryl points out all the features of the property, believing they will add value to the appraisal. A few weeks later, he receives a letter informing him of the compulsory acquisition of his house for the sum of $70,000. His neighbors (elderly Jack, divorcee Evonne, and recent Lebanese immigrants Farouk and Tabula) all receive similar notices. Believing in the common principle that the government cannot evict him unwillingly from his treasured home, Darryl attempts to fight the eviction. Agents from the airport try to bribe and bully the family into giving up, but their actions only stiffen the Kerrigans' resolve. Darryl hires an incompetent lawyer acquaintance, Dennis Denuto (Tiriel Mora), but Dennis's meagre argument that the eviction goes against "the vibe" of the Constitution does not go well in court. While awaiting the court's final decision, Darryl makes pleasant small talk with a man whom he meets outside the courthouse, Lawrence Hammill (Bud Tingwell), who has come to watch his barrister son perform in court in a different case. The court rejects the family's appeal and gives them two weeks to vacate. The purchase price for the home is scarcely enough to cover a small apartment. Dejected in defeat, the family begins to pack.

A new breath of hope comes with the surprise arrival of Lawrence, who reveals himself to be a retired Queen's Counsel. Lawrence has taken an interest in the Kerrigans' case, in part due to his extensive experience in constitutional law, and offers to argue before the High Court of Australia on their behalf, for the public good. In the High Court, Lawrence makes a persuasive case that the Kerrigans have the right to just terms of compensation for the acquisition of property under Section 51(xxxi) of the Australian Constitution. He closes by paraphrasing Darryl's own comments that his house is more than just a structure of bricks and mortar, but a home built with love and shared memories. The court rules in favour of the Kerrigans, and their case becomes a landmark precedent on the subject. An epilogue shows that the Kerrigans continue to prosper happily, and Lawrence becomes a lasting friend of the family.

== Cast ==
- Michael Caton as Darryl Kerrigan, the father
- Anne Tenney as Sal Kerrigan, the mother
- Stephen Curry as Dale Kerrigan, the youngest son, digger of holes, and the film's narrator
- Sophie Lee as Tracey Petropoulous (née Kerrigan), the family's only daughter, a newlywed hairdresser
- Eric Bana as Con Petropoulous, Tracey's new husband, an accountant and amateur kickboxer
- Anthony Simcoe as Steve Kerrigan, the second-oldest son and an apprentice mechanic
- Wayne Hope as Wayne Kerrigan, the black sheep, who is serving time for armed robbery but is loved by his family regardless
- Tiriel Mora as Dennis Denuto, a bumbling small-time lawyer who previously failed to defend Wayne on his charge
- Costas Kilias as Farouk, the Kerrigans' neighbor
- Charles "Bud" Tingwell as Lawrence Hammill Q.C. (Queen's Counsel), a retired barrister who comes to the Kerrigan's aid by representing them pro bono
- Lynda Gibson as Evonne
- Les Toth as Heavy at Door, a local hoodlum who threatens the Kerrigans at their house
- John Flaus as Sgt. Kennedy, a local police officer
- Tony Martin as Adam Hammill, Lawrence's son (brief, mostly non-speaking cameo)
- Larry Emdur as himself (at the time, Emdur was host of the Australian version of The Price Is Right)
- Ian Ross as himself (at the time, Ross was a Channel Nine newsreader)
- Bryan Dawe as lawyer, Ron Graham
- Robyn Nevin as Supreme Court Judge

== Production ==
The film's title is based upon the English saying, repeatedly referred to in the film, "A man's home is his castle". Its humour plays on the national self-image, most notably the concept of working-class Australians and their place in modern Australia.

According to Santo Cilauro, the film took five weeks from its original inception to the final cut. The screenplay was written in two weeks, shot in 10-11 days, and taken to rough cut in two weeks. Its budget was around A$750,000.

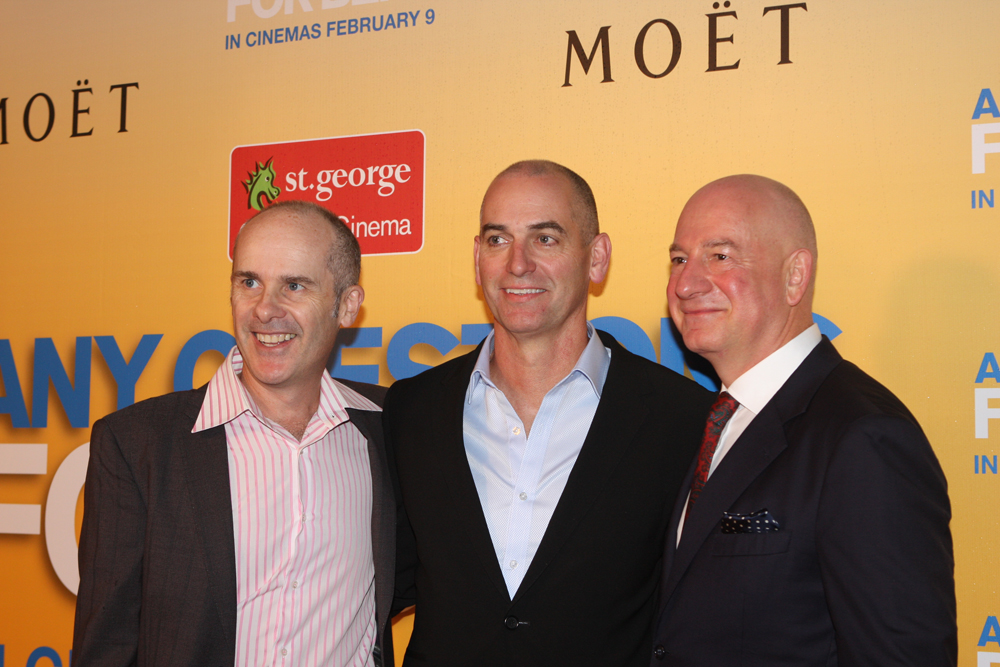
Three of Working Dog's founders: Tom Gleisner (left), Rob Sitch (middle), and Michael Hirsh (right)

Writers Jane Kennedy, Tom Gleisner, Santo Cilauro, and Rob Sitch (who also directed) had met at university and were known for their comedy shows The D-Generation (1986–1987), The Late Show (1992), and Frontline (1994–1997). They had founded Working Dog Productions, along with producer Michael Hirsh, in 1993. The Castle was produced by Debra Choate through Working Dog Productions.

The Castle was filmed mostly in Melbourne, Victoria during July 1996. The external shots of the Kerrigan household were shot at 3 Dagonet St, Strathmore, and airport footage was shot at Essendon Airport and Melbourne Airport. Location shots of Brunswick feature in the film, including Brunswick Town Hall and Rocky Porcino Pharmacy at 720 Sydney Rd (Dennis's office). Melbourne's 200 Queen Street and the Supreme Court of Victoria are featured along with the High Court of Australia in Canberra. The prison shown in the movie is the former HM Pentridge Prison in Coburg, which closed a year after the movie was shot, in 1997. Some of the film is set in the resort of Bonnie Doon, and a very small portion of it was shot there.

The name Kerrigan was chosen for the family so that tow trucks could be borrowed from an existing Melbourne tow truck company with that name. The company still operates today.

In January 2011, 3491 Maintongoon Road, Bonnie Doon was listed for sale. The property appeared in the film as the Kerrigan family holiday house. The property's real estate agent reported that many people called and after requesting the vendor's asking price, replied with a quote from the movie: "Tell him he's dreamin'."

== Legal principles ==
The film refers to the land rights movement of Aboriginal Australians, with Darryl Kerrigan drawing an explicit parallel between his struggle and theirs. It also draws on one of the few rights protected in the Australian Constitution for subject matter, the right to just terms compensation for acquisition of property under s51(xxxi). Also interspersed in the film are many references to famous Australian Constitutional Law Cases, such as Mabo and the Tasmanian Dams Case. The film also deals with section 109 of the Constitution which provides that in the case of an inconsistency between Federal and State law, the Federal law shall prevail to the extent of the inconsistency.

For the purpose of the drama, some of the relevant legal principles are simplified. For example, the law relating to compulsory acquisition can be complicated and raises more questions than are noted in the film. Section 51 (xxxi) of the Commonwealth Constitution applies to acquisitions only by the Commonwealth, not by the States, and the latter are more likely to compulsorily acquire property. Similarly, in contrast to Kerrigan's idea that the value he places on his own home cannot be bought, the law regularly places a monetary value on intangible human values.

== Themes ==
The Castle can be seen as a social study on the lives and aspirations of the inhabitants of suburban Australia. The central character, Darryl Kerrigan, ties into the stereotypical depiction of an "Aussie battler", a man who will protect and serve his family through bold and sometimes ruthless assertion. The Aussie battler will at times face challenges or adversity, often in the face of an oppressive government or economic hardship. Kerrigan, and to a lesser extent his wife and children, are committed to their pursuit of the Australian Dream. The Castle has also been seen as "a canonised text for Australian settler identity".

== Release ==
The Castle was released in Australian cinemas on 10 April 1997.

The film was released in New York and Los Angeles on 7 May 1999, after being delayed for two years by Miramax, when it had to compete with The Phantom Menace.

In the US version, there were several minor changes to the dialogue. "Rissole" was changed to "meatloaf", "two-stroke" was changed to "diesel", references to the Australian TV show Hey Hey It's Saturday were changed to the more generic Funniest Home Videos (which existed in both markets), and brand names of various cars in the driveway were changed from uniquely Australian cars like the Camira to ones sold in both countries like the Corolla.

== Reception ==
=== Box office ===
The Castle previewed on 34 screens in Australia and grossed A$122,256 ranking 14th at the Australian box office for the week. It officially opened on 10 April 1997 on 86 screens and grossed A$1,137,703 for the week, ranking fourth. Its per-screen average of A$13,229 was second only just behind the opening of the special edition of The Empire Strikes Back. It grossed A$10,326,439 at the box office in Australia, over 13 times its A$750,000 budget.

Paramount Pictures bought distribution rights to the United Kingdom and South Africa, and was also offered North American distribution rights, which it refused to buy. A bidding war for North American rights took place, with Gramercy Pictures, Miramax Films, and LIVE Entertainment being the frontrunners and Columbia TriStar also expressing interest in buying the rights. Ultimately, North American rights were bought by Miramax for a rumoured $6 million. The film grossed $877,621 in the United States and Canada.

=== Critical reception and ongoing impact ===
In Australia, the film received critical acclaim, is considered an iconic classic, and is frequently listed as one of the greatest Australian films ever made.

The Castle received positive reviews from overseas critics. It has an 87% approval rating from the review-aggregation website Rotten Tomatoes, based on 38 reviews, with a weighted average of 7.10/10. The website's critics consensus reads, "Home is where the heart is in The Castle, a rousing Australian comedy that gives audiences an endearing family to root for."

Roger Ebert gave the film 3 stars out of 4, calling it "one of those comic treasures like The Full Monty and Waking Ned Devine that shows its characters in the full bloom of glorious eccentricity".

After its US release in 1999, Boxoffice Magazine gave the film 4 out of 5 stars, concluding in its review that "The Castle will be a worthwhile discovery for fans of off-beat humor ... Beneath this film's perfectly modulated deadpan delivery beats a sincere and affectionate heart". Harper's Bazaar wrote that the film "is chock full of riotous Capraesque sentiment and is one of the funniest movies I've seen in 11 years", while Time Out New York called it "a textbook example of low-brow, feel-good entertainment, a rousing jolly romp that has you chuckling as you leave the theatre".

In 2011, Time Out London named it the 25th-greatest comedy film of all time. The Castle was selected by the public as Australia's favourite film in a 2008 online poll conducted by the Australian Film Institute in collaboration with Australia Post, and in a 2018 public vote run by the Adelaide Film Festival, it was voted as the greatest Australian film ever. In July 2026 GQ Australia ranked the film 9th in its list of "23 highest rated Australian films of all time", which it based on analysing data from all of the major film review databases worldwide.

The film continues to be studied in secondary education in Australia.

=== Accolades ===
| Award | Category | Subject | Result |
|---|---|---|---|
| AACTA Award (1997 AFI Awards) | Best Original Screenplay | Santo Cilauro | Won |
| AACTA Award (1997 AFI Awards) | Best Original Screenplay | Tom Gleisner | Won |
| AACTA Award (1997 AFI Awards) | Best Original Screenplay | Jane Kennedy | Won |
| AACTA Award (1997 AFI Awards) | Best Original Screenplay | Rob Sitch | Won |
| AACTA Award (1997 AFI Awards) | Best Actor | Michael Caton | Nominated |
| AACTA Award (1997 AFI Awards) | Best Supporting Actor | Charles Tingwell | Nominated |
| AACTA Award (1997 AFI Awards) | Best Supporting Actress | Sophie Lee | Nominated |
| Australian Movie Convention | Australian Movie of the Year | Rob Sitch | Won |
| British Independent Film Award | Best Foreign Independent Film – English Language | | Nominated |
| European Film Award | Screen International Award | Rob Sitch | Nominated |
| FCCA Awards | Best Film | | Nominated |
| FCCA Awards | Best Screenplay – Original | Santo Cilauro | Nominated |
| FCCA Awards | Best Screenplay – Original | Tom Gleisner | Nominated |
| FCCA Awards | Best Screenplay – Original | Jane Kennedy | Nominated |
| FCCA Awards | Best Screenplay – Original | Rob Sitch | Nominated |
| FCCA Awards | Best Actor – Male | Michael Caton | Nominated |
| FCCA Awards | Best Supporting Actor – Male | Charles Tingwell | Nominated |
| FCCA Awards | Best Supporting Actor – Female | Sophie Lee | Nominated |
| Stockholm International Film Festival | Bronze Horse | Rob Sitch | Nominated |

== Home media ==
In Australia, the film was released on VHS by Roadshow Entertainment in 1997, with a DVD following on November 10, 2004. Buena Vista Home Entertainment (under the Miramax Home Entertainment banner) released it on DVD and VHS in the United States on November 16, 1999. The film's Canadian DVD release was handled by Alliance Entertainment, who had a Canadian distribution agreement with Miramax at the time.

In December 2010, North American distributor Miramax was sold by The Walt Disney Company, their owners since 1993. That month, they were taken over by private equity firm Filmyard Holdings. Beginning in 2011, Filmyard Holdings started licensing the home video rights for many Miramax films to Lionsgate Home Entertainment, and in 2012, Lionsgate reissued The Castle on DVD in the United States. In 2011, Filmyard Holdings also licensed the Miramax library to streaming site Netflix (which then wasn't available in Australia). This deal included The Castle, and ran for five years, eventually ending on 1 June 2016. The film's British distributor Paramount Pictures released it on DVD in the UK on 25 July 2011.

In March 2016, Filmyard Holdings sold Miramax to Qatari company beIN Media Group. In April 2020, ViacomCBS (now known as Paramount Skydance) acquired the rights to Miramax's 700 film library, after buying a 49% stake in the studio from beIN. The deal included the North American rights to The Castle, and the film is now distributed in that area by Paramount Pictures, who prior to 2020 had only owned British and South African distribution rights for The Castle.

== Representation in other media ==
In Adam Elliot's 2024 stop-motion animation feature, Memoir of a Snail, one of the businesses featured in early street scenes is for 'Dennis Denuto, Chartered Accountant', referencing The Castle's lawyer.

In 2017's Thor: Ragnarok, the character of Topaz comments on a request for a large bounty to be paid by saying "Tell her she's dreaming", paraphrasing Darryl and Dale debating the value of goods in the classified section of the newspaper.

== Stage adaptation ==
In July 2026, a stage adaptation of the film was announced by Working Dog Productions and Michael Cassel Group. The adaptation was written by Sitch, Gleisner, Cilauro, and Kennedy. The production will be directed by Paige Rattray and produced by Michael Cassel. It is scheduled to premiere at Her Majesty's Theatre in Melbourne on 23 March 2027. Around 24 hours after the announcement was made, the production set a new box office record, with the highest first-day ticket sales for a play in the history of the theatre.

== See also ==
- Australian constitutional law
- Cinema of Australia
- Mabo v Queensland (No 2)
