= Veyshnoria =

Fictional state created for Zapad 2017

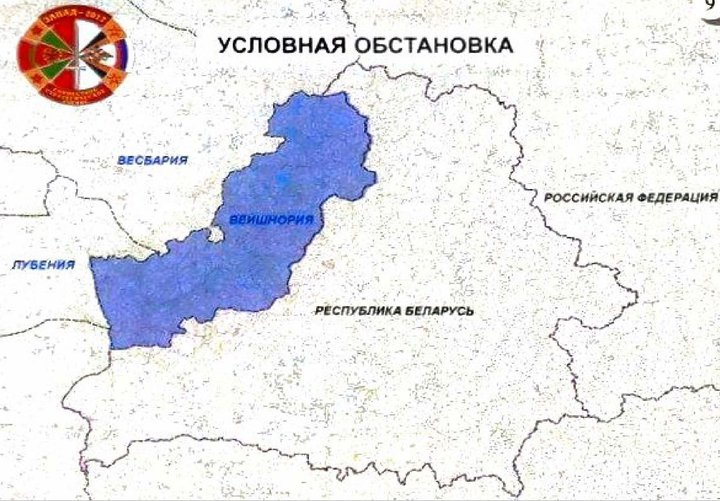
- Borders of the state Veyshnoria (shaded in blue) according to Zapad 2017

In-universe information
- Type: Fictional country
- Locations: Europe

Veyshnoria (Russian: Вейшнория, romanized: Veyshnoriya, Belarusian: Вайшнорыя, romanized: Vajšnoryja) is a fictional state created for Zapad 2017, a joint Russo-Belarusian military training exercise. It neighbours Belarus and is an enemy of the Union State. Veyshnoria occupies most of Grodno Region and the northwestern parts of the Minsk and Vitebsk regions.

There are two other fictional enemies of the Zapad 2017 participants: Vesbaria and Lubenia. Lubenia straddles the Suwałki Gap and covers parts of northeastern Poland and southwestern Lithuania, while Vesbaria covers the rest of Lithuania and central Latvia.

The "proclamation" of the state caused a response on the Internet, often humorous. Since September 2017, a web-based Veyshnoria have been proclaimed, which started acquiring the signs of an Internet-based micronation with more than 18,000 people signing for "citizenship".

== Toponymy ==
The name "Veyshnoria" comes from the Baltic name of Veisnor (Lithuanian "Vaišnoras", Old Prussian "Waisnor") – vaiš- (vaišės = feast) + nor- (norėti = to will): "one who wills to treat", "hospitable". There are several places in Lithuania called Vaišnoriai (plural for "Vaišnoras"), including Vaišnoriai (Šiauliai), Vaišnoriai (Joniškis).

== Zapad 2017 scenario ==
Zapad 2017 was a joint strategic military exercise of the armed forces of Russia and Belarus (the Union State of Russia and Belarus) held 14–20 September 2017, in Belarus as well as in Russia's Kaliningrad Oblast and other northwestern areas.

According to the scenario a conflict between "the North" (the Union State) and "the West" (a coalition of three aggressor states: Veyshnoria, Vesbaria and Lubenia) developed. "The West" tries to split the union of Belarus and Russia, worsen the socio-economic situation in the Union State, and force a change of leadership, and Veyshnoria is trying to annex parts of Belarus. After that, "the West" sends its troops to enter the rest of the territory of Belarus. The Union State resists these actions.

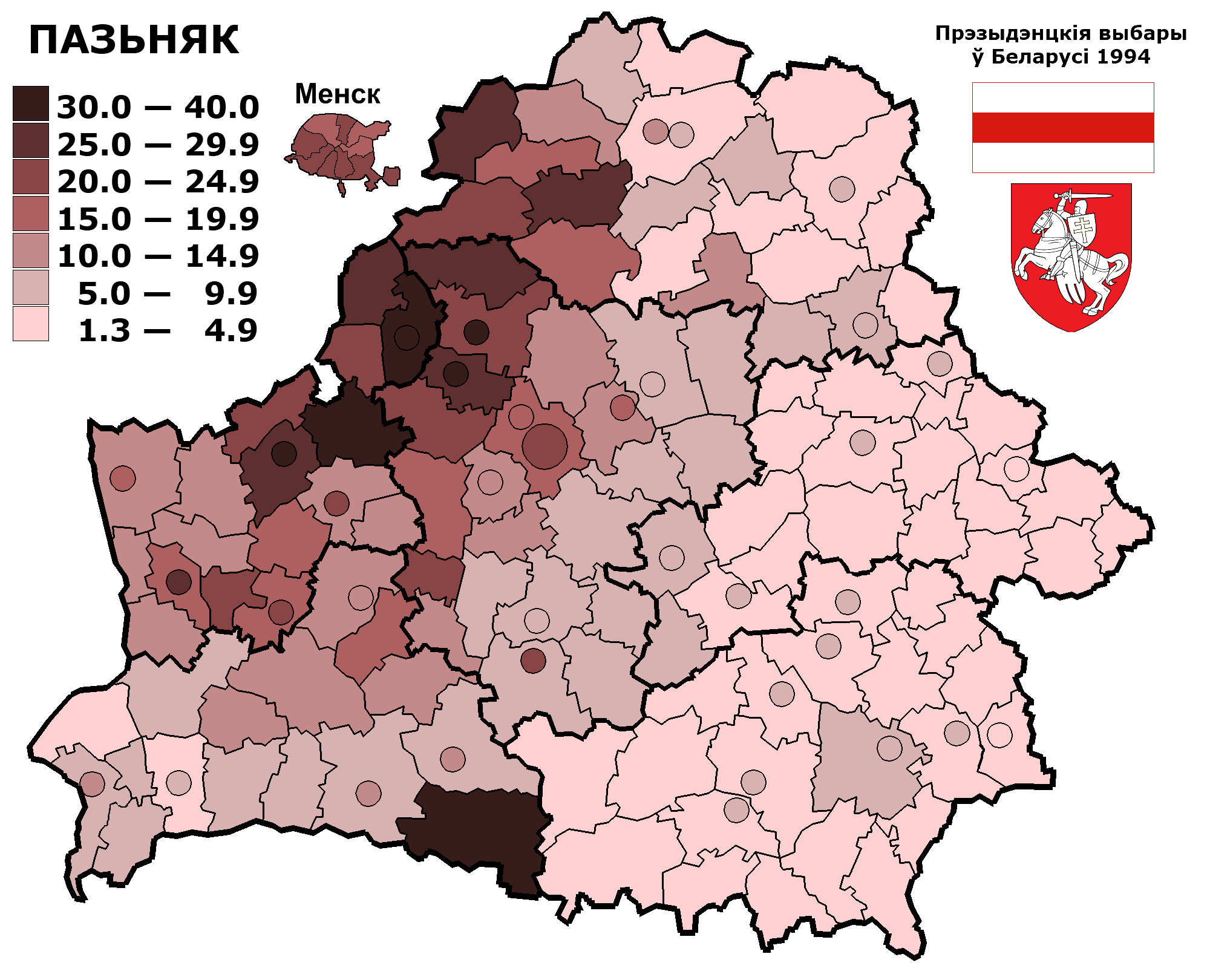
Paznyak's electoral map

In a post on Facebook, Siarhey Chaly noticed a similarity between Veyshnoria and the region of Belarus where a large percentage of voters supported Zianon Pazniak in the first round of the 1994 presidential election. Journalist Leonid Bershidsky further pointed out that this territory has a high proportion of Catholic population and a high share of Belarusian-language speakers in the bilingual Russian-Belarusian state with the dominant Russian Orthodox Church. In Bershidsky's view these observations may be how the Zapad 2017 scenario was intended to be seen: Veyshnoria seeks destabilisation of Belarus the same way, in the eyes of the Russian establishment, it happened in Ukraine (by pro-Western national forces, allegedly fomented by "the West").

== Internet reaction ==
Flag of the humorous “state” of Veyshnoria

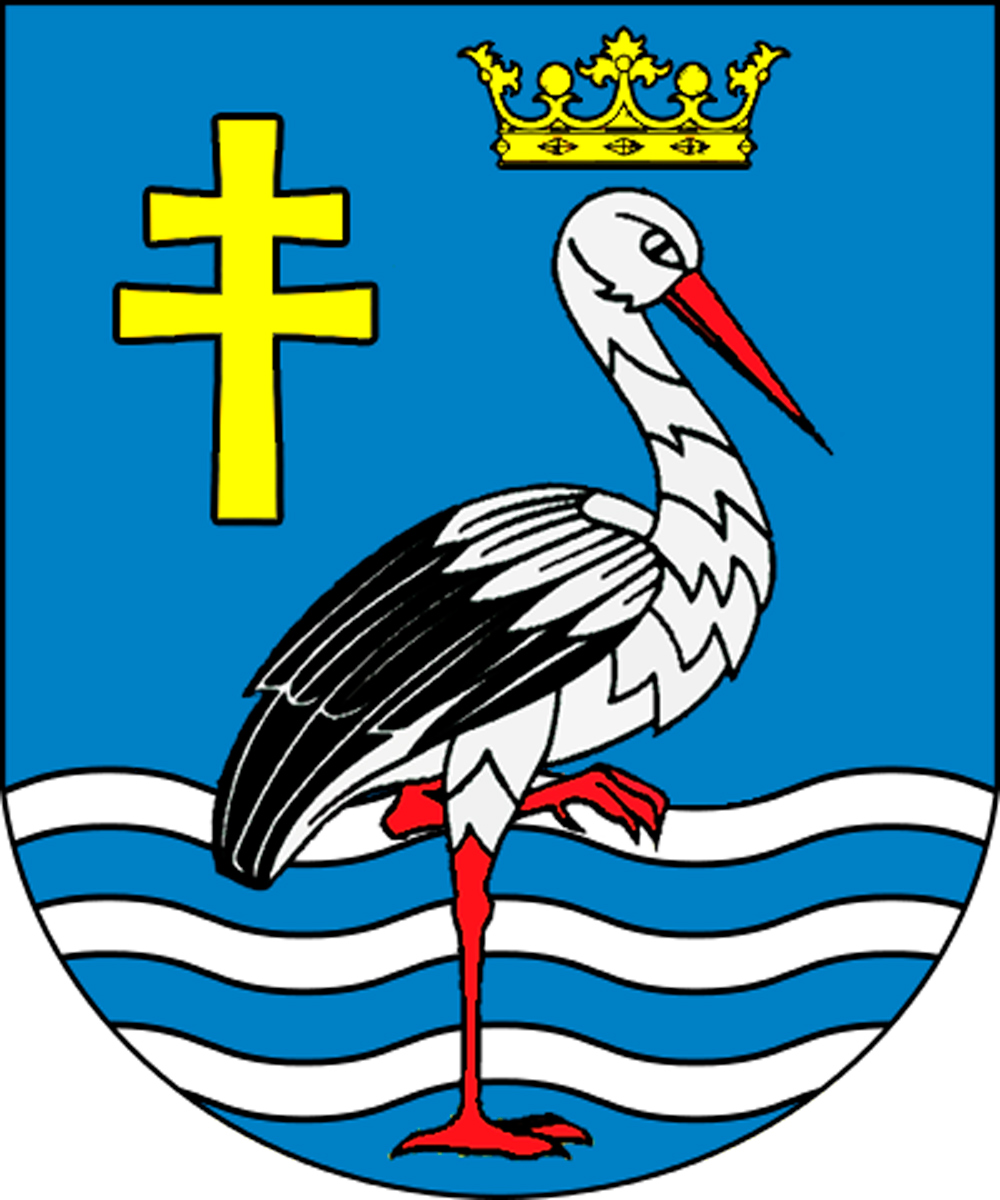
Coat of arms of the humorous “state” of Veyshnoria

The creation quickly found a humorous response in social media. On 30 August 2017, a satirical Twitter account of the Foreign Ministry of Veyshnoria appeared, which published political statements on behalf of the state. According to the account, the anthem of the state is the song "Niamon" (meaning "Neman") by the Belarusian band Stary Olsa. The same account says that the official residences of the state are in Grodno, the parliament and the government (in addition to the Ministry of Culture) in Lida, and the cultural capital of Veyshnoria is Smarhon. Veyshnoria is also present on Facebook, and its Russian Wikipedia article had been noted as "a dry rundown of how Veyshnoria emerged" before the article was deleted and redirected to the article on Zapad 2017.

== Monetisation ==
Some Belarusian businessmen were quick to monetise Veyshnoria by launching a Veyshnoria website and legally registering it as a gaming service. After Belarusian President Alexander Lukashenko issued the decree which made cryptocurrencies a legal method of payment and the Taler (TLR) cryptocurrency was launched in Belarus, Taler was made the official currency of Veyshnoria. Later the development of Taler was transferred "under the patronage of Veyshnoria" and the pre-mining assets were passed to Veyshnoria.

== Government reaction ==
In August 2022, the Lida District Court of Belarus declared the Veyshnoria social networks "extremist materials". In 2026, the Ministry of Internal Affairs of Belarus declared Veyshnoria an extremist group.

== See also ==
- Atropia, fictional country made by the U.S. Army, similarly for military exercises
- San Escobar, another fictional country that emerged from a spontaneous Internet reaction
