= Witold Waszczykowski =

Polish politician (born 1957)

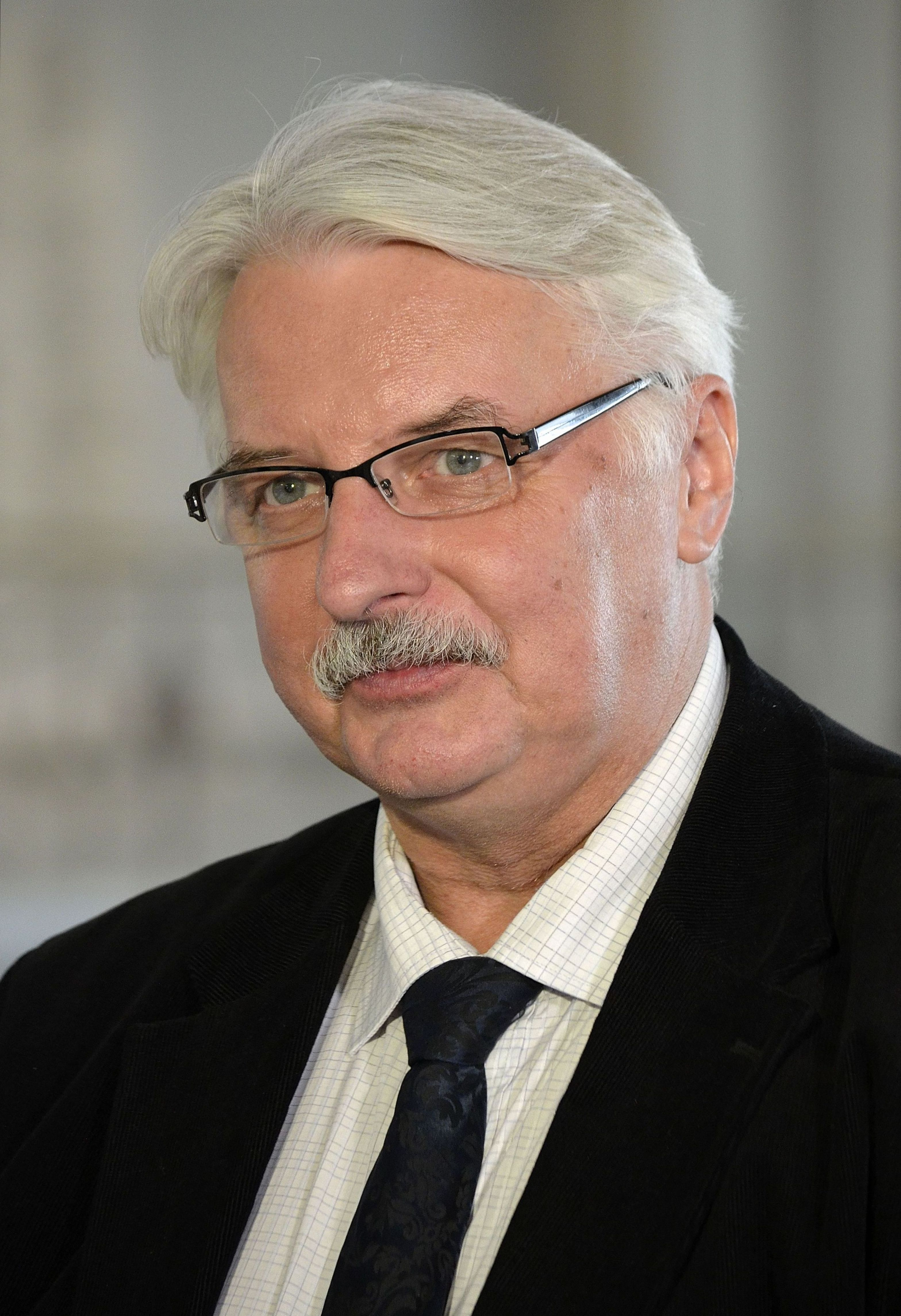
- Waszczykowski in 2015

Minister of Foreign Affairs
- In office 16 November 2015 – 9 January 2018
- Prime Minister: Beata Szydło; Mateusz Morawiecki
- Preceded by: Grzegorz Schetyna
- Succeeded by: Jacek Czaputowicz

Personal details
- Born: Witold Jan Waszczykowski; 5 May 1957 (age 69) Piotrków Trybunalski, Poland
- Party: Law and Justice
- Education: University of Łódź; University of Oregon
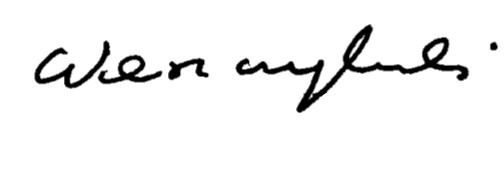
- Signature

Witold Jan Waszczykowski (Polish: [ˈvitɔld vaʂt͡ʂɨˈkɔfskʲi]; (Note: In isolation, Witold is pronounced [ˈvitɔlt].) born 5 May 1957) is a Polish politician. He was the Minister of Foreign Affairs between 2015 and 2018. Waszczykowski was a Member of the Sejm (2011–2019), and has been a Member of the European Parliament to 2024.

== Life and career ==
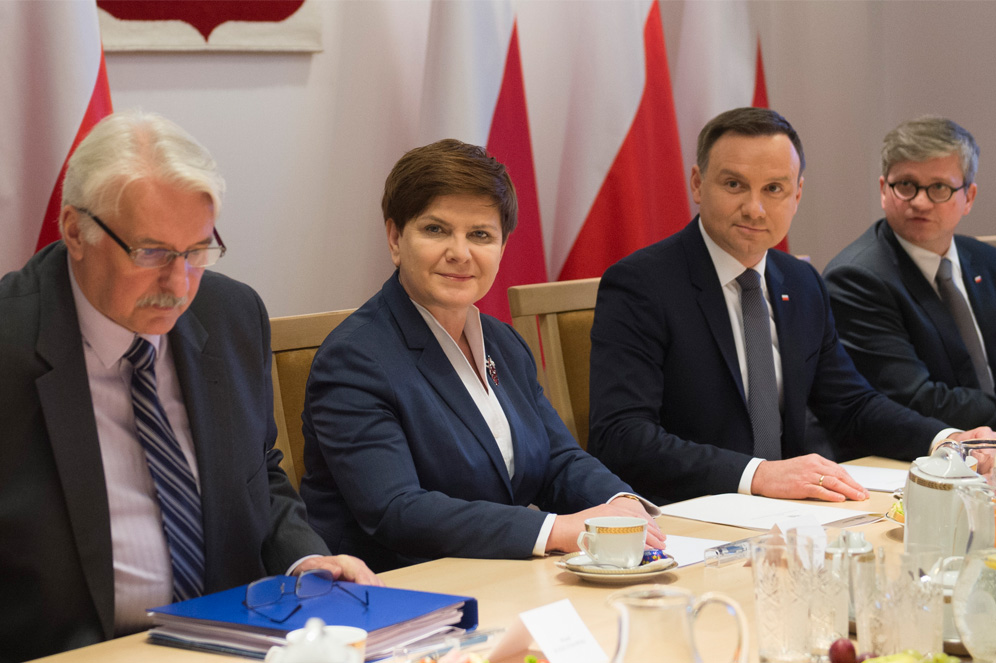
Members of the National Security Council, from left to right: Waszczykowski, Beata Szydło, Andrzej Duda and Paweł Soloch n 2016

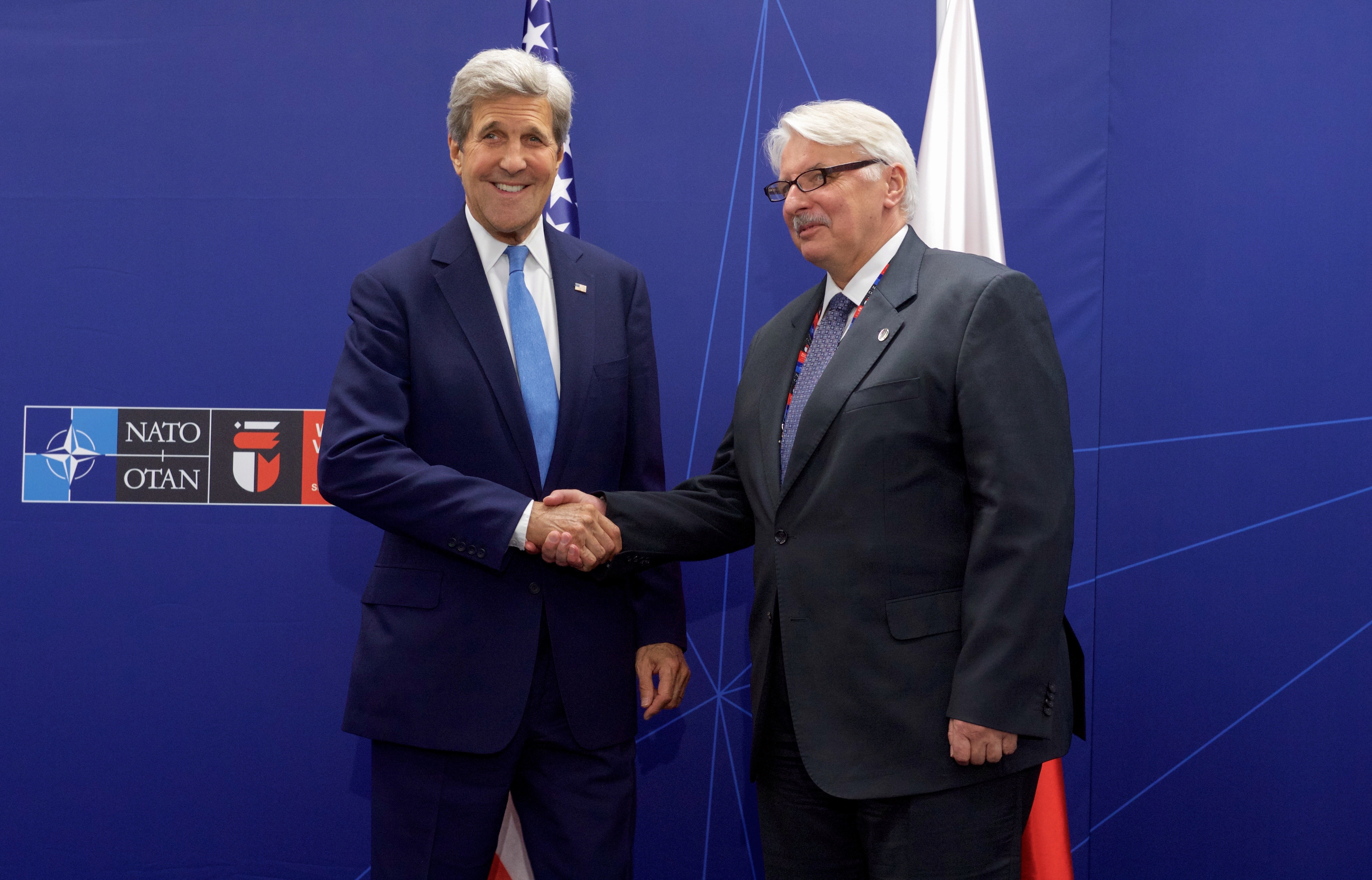
Waszczykowski with U.S. Secretary of State John Kerry during 2016 Warsaw summit

Waszczykowski was born in Piotrków Trybunalski, Poland on 5 May 1957. He is a graduate of the University of Łódź, earning a Master's degree in history, and the University of Oregon, where he received a master's degree in international studies. Waszczykowski completed advanced studies at the Geneva Centre for Security Policy. He also holds a PhD in history from the University of Łódź.

He joined the Ministry of Foreign Affairs in 1992. Between 1997 and 1999 he was working at the Permanent Representation of Poland to NATO in Brussels as deputy chief of mission. From 1999 to 2002, Waszczykowski was the Ambassador of Poland to Iran. On 4 November 2005, he became Deputy Minister of Foreign Affairs. Waszczykowski served as the chief negotiator with the United States on missile defense. He served until 11 August 2008.

From 27 August 2008 to 6 July 2010, Waszczykowski was the Deputy Head of the National Security Bureau. In the 2011 parliamentary elections, he successfully ran for the Sejm. He was reelected in 2015.

On 16 November 2015, Waszczykowski was appointed the Minister of Foreign Affairs in the Cabinet of Beata Szydło.

On 10 January 2017, he accidentally referred to the country of Saint Kitts and Nevis as "San Escobar" (the mistake reportedly stems from the islands' Spanish name, San Cristóbal y Nieves). This was immediately picked up by newspapers throughout the world, such as The Guardian, The Telegraph, The Washington Post, The New York Times, and Britské listy.

In 2019, he was elected member of the European Parliament, receiving 168,021 votes.

Waszczykowski has also worked with the Sobieski Institute.

In February 2023, Waszczykowski was diagnosed with amyotrophic lateral sclerosis.

== Positions held ==
- Ambassador to Iran (1999 – 2002)
- Deputy Minister of Foreign Affairs (4 November 2005 – 11 August 2008)
- Deputy Head of the National Security Bureau (27 August 2008 – 6 July 2010)
- Member of the Sejm (9 October 2011 – 2019)
- Minister of Foreign Affairs (November 2015 – January 2018)
- Member of the European Parliament (2019 – present)

== See also ==
- List of foreign ministers in 2017

== Notes ==
Political offices
Preceded by Grzegorz Schetyna	Minister of Foreign Affairs; 2015–2018	Succeeded by Jacek Czaputowicz
