= San Escobar =

Non-existent country

- The fictitious flag of San Escobar used by hoaxsters
- Created by: Witold Waszczykowski

In-universe information
- Other name: People's Democratic Republic of San Escobar (in Spanish República Popular Democrática de San Escobar) (in Polish Demokratyczna Republika Ludowa San Escobar)

San Escobar is a fictional country originating from a gaffe by the Minister of Foreign Affairs of Poland, Witold Waszczykowski.

== Origin ==
On 10 January 2017, Waszczykowski told reporters that, in a bid for a non-permanent seat for Poland on the UN Security Council, he had meetings with officials from various countries, including some Caribbean nations, with some of them "perhaps for the first time in the history of our diplomacy. For example with countries such as San Escobar or Belize".

A governmental spokeswoman said it had been a slip of the tongue for "San Cristóbal y Nieves", which is Spanish for Saint Kitts and Nevis. News about San Escobar swept over numerous media outlets all over the world.

== Internet phenomenon ==
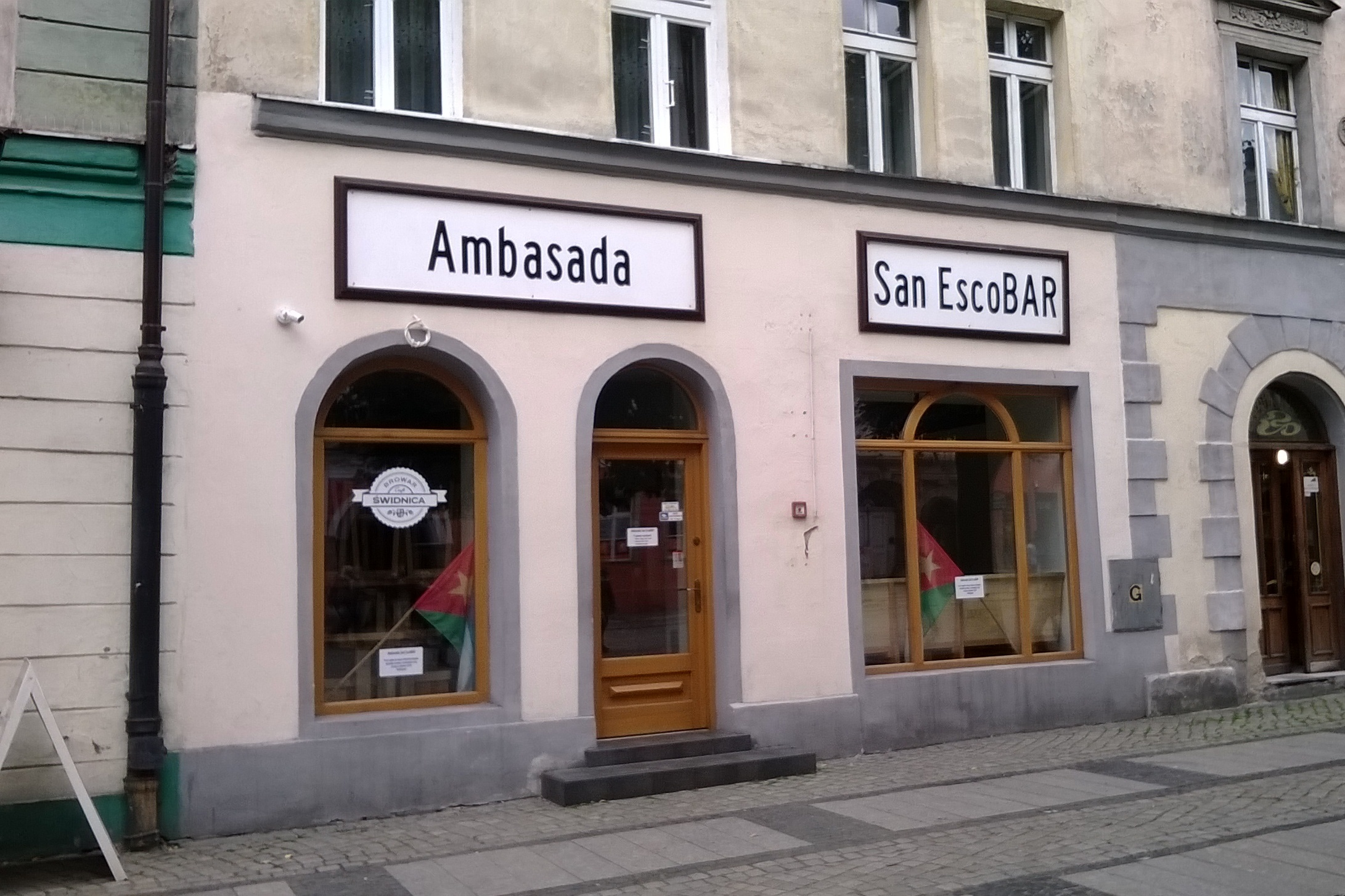
"Ambasada San EscoBAR", a beerhouse opened in August 2017 in Świdnica, Poland

The country gained a significant presence on the Internet and was spontaneously given a fictitious identity on social media, including photographs, maps, and a flag featuring blue, white, and green stripes and a yellow 5-pointed star in a red triangle. The Facebook page was created by Jarek Kubicki, a member of the Razem political party.

Within a day, the hashtag #SanEscobar was tracked by over 2 million people and became the most popular within the Polish segment of Twitter. San Escobar also became a subject of numerous joke news reports, such as those about an appointment of a military attaché and its nice ecology. A good deal of them played upon drug lord Pablo Escobar, popularized via the TV series Narcos.

A Twitter account for 'República Popular Democrática de San Escobar' (@rpdsanescobar) quickly rose to prominence after it was established. It announced full support for Waszczykowski in his endeavor and issues various news releases in Spanish and English, including a reproach towards Saint Kitts and Nevis: the correction of the Polish spokeswoman was interpreted as an attempt to foil Poland–San Escobar relations. San Escobar issues a newspaper, San Escobar Times (also on Twitter).

San Escobar also became a popular travel destination via "El Niño Airlines". For a while, the phrase "A może rzucić to wszystko i polecieć do San Escobar?" (English: "Maybe I better drop it all and fly to San Escobar?"), a play on the Polish saying "A może rzucić to wszystko i wyjechać w Bieszczady", became very popular. Ticketing service Fru wrote that there are only one-way tickets to San Escobar. Netflix (the creator of Narcos) also allegedly claimed that it already has airline tickets to sell. Other accounts were soon created for political and other entities within San Escobar, like one for 'El Frente Comunista de San Escobar' (The Communist Front of San Escobar), which leads a guerrilla war against the fictional country's government.

Waszczykowski quickly became a target of various forms of derision. For example, a newspaper published suggestions of other countries for Waszczykowski to consider, such as San Serriffe or various micronations.

On 20 January 2017, Comedy Central Poland recorded an anthem of San Escobar sung by Eric Cartman, an animated South Park character.

In 2017, Waszczykowski won the Polskie Radio Program III listener's poll "Silver Lips" for the most surprising or funniest utterance by a Polish public figure. While receiving the award, Waszczykowski commented: "I'd rather expect the note of recognition from the Geographical Society. It did not arrive." The phenomenon of San Escobar became the subject of a scholarly paper.

== See also ==
- List of fictional countries
- Other fictional countries with unexpected internet presence include Listenbourg, Atropia, and Veyshnoria
- Uryupinsk § In popular culture
