= Phaic Tăn =

Parody travel guidebook

- Phaic Tăn: Sunstroke on a Shoestring
- Author: Tom Gleisner; Santo Cilauro; Rob Sitch
- Language: English
- Subject: Fictional country
- Genre: Travel; comedy
- Publisher: Jetlag Travel
- Publication date: 2004
- Publication place: Australia
- Pages: 256
- ISBN: 1-74066-199-0
- OCLC: 60453721
- Dewey Decimal: A827.4 22
- LC Class: PN6231.T7 C57 2004
- Preceded by: Molvanîa
- Followed by: San Sombrèro

Phaic Tăn
- Phaic Tăn: Sunstroke on a Shoestring location
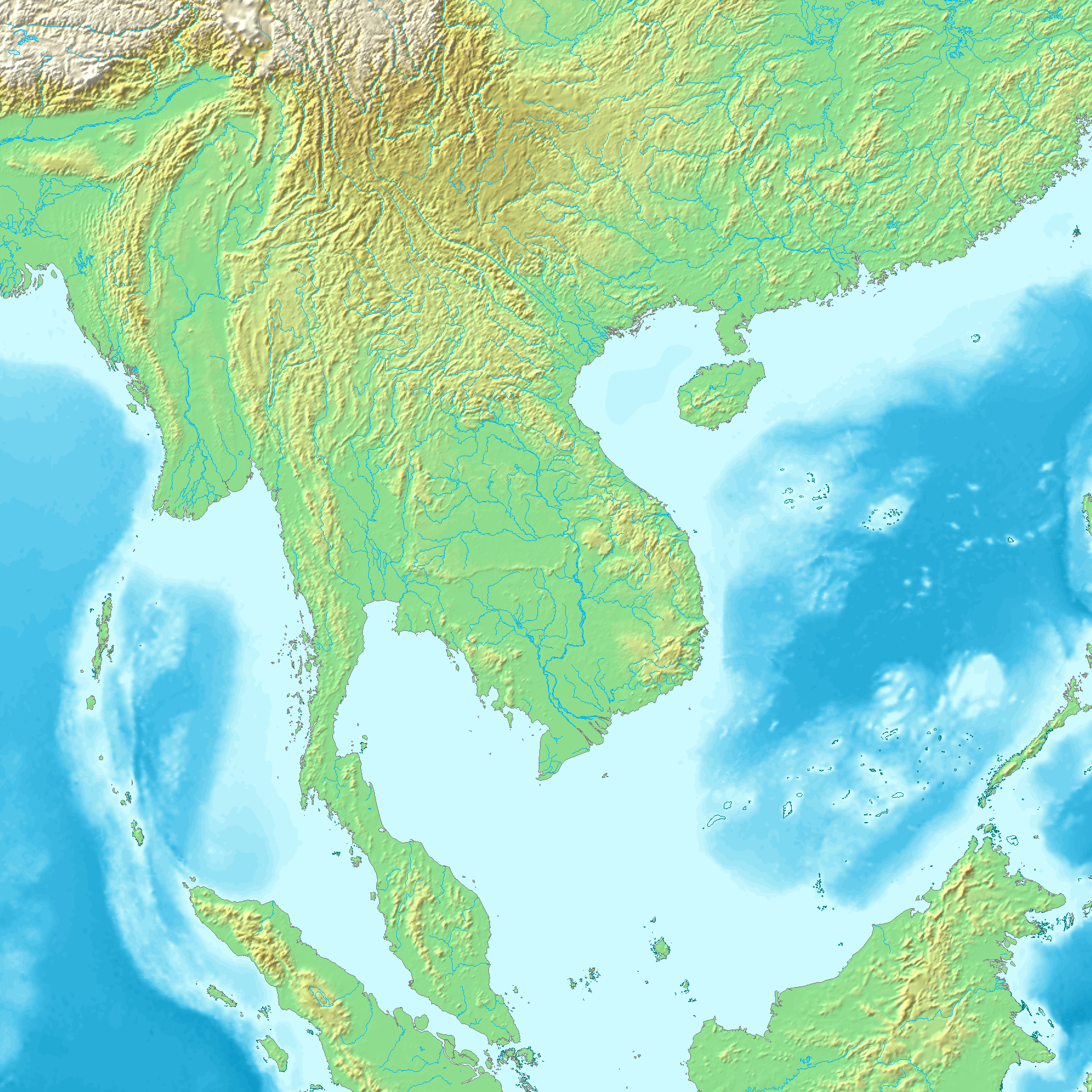
- General location of Phaic Tăn
- Created by: Tom Gleisner; Santo Cilauro; Rob Sitch
- Genre: Parody

In-universe information
- Other name: Kingdom of Phaic Tăn
- Type: Monarchy
- Locations: Bumpattabumpah (capital)
- Anthem: "Rong Ki"
- Language(s): Phaic Tănese
- Currency: P'ting (100 P'tong)

Phaic Tăn (subtitled Sunstroke on a Shoestring) is a 2004 parody travel guide examining fictional country Phaic Tăn. The book was written by Australians Tom Gleisner, Santo Cilauro, and Rob Sitch. Along with the other Jetlag Travel volumes, 2003's Molvanîa and 2006's San Sombrèro, the book parodies both the language of heritage tourism and the legacy of colonialism and imperialism.

== About Phaic Tăn ==
The Kingdom of Phaic Tăn is a composite creation of a number of stereotypes and clichés about South East Asian countries.

Phaic Tăn is said to be situated in Indochina. Place names in Phaic Tăn initially seem to be Vietnamese or Thai, but they form English language puns, hence the capital is called "Bumpattabumpah" ("bumper to bumper"). "Phaic Tăn" can be read as "Fake Tan". Also, the districts are the mountainous "Pha Phlung" ("far flung"), the infertile "Sukkondat" ("suck on that"), the hyper "Buhng Lunhg" ("bung lung"; Australian slang 'bung', meaning 'failed'), and the exotic "Thong On".

The country was an ancient kingdom colonized by France, but was liberated in the early 20th century through student and communist uprisings. A Marxist dictatorship under Chau Quoc continued until his death in 1947, which prompted the country to launch into a lengthy civil war. Eventually a CIA-backed coup ("Operation Freedom") made the country into a military dictatorship which it remains to this day. The country has a popular royal family, though the current king has been deposed no fewer than 25 times.

Like Molvanîa, the humour of the book comes from the guide's attempts to present Phaic Tăn as an attractive, enjoyable country when it is really little more than a squalid, third-world dump. The country is frequently plagued by monsoons and earthquakes and many armed militia groups still patrol the streets.

The Phaic Tăn people are presented to be extremely superstitious, and obsessed with the concept of luck. The index of the book contains a list of almost 600 numbers the Phaic Tănese consider lucky, plus two considered unlucky (3 and 6). Turning left while driving is also considered unlucky, which causes a lot of traffic problems. Also unlucky are asking for a non-exotic massage, having more than five holes in Quic Pot, and losing a lottery.

The current king is Sukhimbol Tralanhng III, ninth king of the Angit dynasty. King Falanhng prides himself on being something of a musician and composer. In fact, the country's national anthem was actually written by him and whenever it is played Phaic Tănese will immediately stand and place one hand over each ear. His wife is the very overweight Suahm Luprang, his crown prince is the perverted Ferduk, his daughter is the also overweight (and embarrassed) Buk Phang, and his youngest son is Luat the Brooding, who was arrested for misusing a gun.

=== Geography and provinces ===
According to the book, Phaic Tăn is a country situated in Indochina of South-east Asia. It is shown in the book's map as being bounded to the south by the Lhong Chuk Sea and the Pong and Kut Rivers to the north and east respectively.

Phaic Tăn is depicted as being roughly 650 kilometres abroad from east–west at its broadest point and the same distance from its far geographical north-east tip to the Pong Delta in the country's south-east.

The country is divided by several rivers, including the Sirikan, Upper Kut and the Nahkthong. The country's major rivers are the Pong and Nahkthong, which both finish in the Pong and Nahkthong Deltas respectively.

Phaic Tăn is made up of four provinces (going in order clockwise), Sukkondat, Pha Phlung, Buhng Lung and Thong On. The provinces are connected by roads, but not by rail, as rail gauges vary throughout the country and sometimes even on the same line.

In one page, the country's location is contradicted from being in Indochina to being between North and South Korea.

==== Bumpattabumpah ====
The capital city of Phaic Tăn is Bumpattabumpah, which is situated in Buhng Lung in a roughly central position on the Pong River and at the west end of the Upper Kut River. Bumpattabumpah is Phaic Tăn's largest city, and presumably the most populous.

According to the book, Bumpattabumpah means "water convergence" and refers to the fact that the city is situated where the country's main river, the Pong, meets untreated effluent from a sewage treatment plant further upstream. Also, Bumpattabumpah was previously named "Phxux Xauan" but was changed because a survey revealed that less than 12% of the population were able to pronounce it.

An in-book map of Bumpattabumpah shows the names of its suburbs, all English-language puns: Qic Phuk, Phlat Tiht and Dud Bhonk. Many of the names of the roads throughout the city are also English puns, as is the name of the city's and country's major airport, Phlat Chat Airport.

High smog levels in the capital city mean that office blocks require no window tinting, a result of heavy amounts of air pollution. In 1997, developers announced plans to build the tallest office block in the world. Construction actually began but only a short while after the foundations were dug the Asian economic crisis hit, meaning the project was completely shelved. Bumpattabumpah now boasts the largest unfenced hole in the world.

==== Sukkondat ====
Sukkondat is traditionally Phaic Tăn's poorest province, due to the infertility of its soil, lack of natural resources and high number of casinos. An agricultural province, farmers harvest hay in order to camouflage their true primary crop, opium. The capital of the province is Sloh Phan, which is located about ninety kilometres north-east of Gunsa Wah, Phaic Tăn's tallest peak, at 2150 metres in height. Despite the fact that Sukkondat receives less than 2% of all visitors to Phaic Tăn every year, this statistic hasn't stopped its local Tourism Bureau from declaring the province 'the place to be'.

==== Pha Phlung ====
Pha Phlung, in the country's northeast, is mountainous and renowned for its rainforests, waterfalls and mud-slides. Pha Phlung is traditionally known as the "Land of a Thousand Tigers" and, while actual numbers may be closer to seven (counting five in the Lom Buak Grand Circus), nature walks through Pha Phlung are an excellent way to see nature and wildlife up close. The capital of this wet and humid province is Nham Pong.

==== Buhng Lung ====
According to the book, Buhng Lung is a busy province where all car horns have cruise control, set to go off every ten seconds. The Pong Delta is located in the south-east of the Buhng Lung province. The capital city of Bumpattabumpah is located in the north of the province.

==== Thong On ====
Thong On is an exotic province of which Pattaponga, located on the coast of Kru Kut Bay, is the capital. The coast is composed of many beaches. Of particular note is Zou Kow Bow Beach, which is said to have the whitest sand of any beach in the world. The beach sand's whiteness was formed in the 1980s by the rare combination of global warming and a huge spill from a tanker carrying laundry bleach.

=== Flag ===
The Phaic Tănese flag has the design of a ping-pong (table tennis) table. It is known as the Phing Pong, and is noted to be the world's only hinged flag, which while unconventional, "makes flag-folding ceremonies easier".

=== Language ===
The Phaic Tănese language is a tonal language with four tones, sharing similarities with Chinese. There is also a fifth tone emerging, but this tone is largely restricted to use by rappers. It is spoken with an average of 192 syllables per minute.

=== Pyangtru Yix Qaugen (Hospital of Hearts) ===
The Phaic Tăn website features a 2-minute sample of a spoof soap opera called Pyangtru Yix Qaugen (Hospital of Hearts), in which the characters (Doctor Lahbkot, 3-star ruthless General Kpow and his much younger millionairess wife) speak in what appears to be a dialect of Chinese spoken in Taiwan and parts of Fujian, Vietnamese and some heavily accented garbled sounds made to resemble Korean, subtitled in a stilted form of English, with curious turns of phrase and double entendres. This is a parody of the English subtitles often encountered on kung fu movies, or an attempt at Engrish.

== Other titles in the Jetlag Travel series ==
- Molvanîa
- San Sombrèro

This book advertises other (fictional) travel guides on the industrialized Costa del Pom (Iberia), Pfaffland (Scandinavia), unappetizing Gastronesia (South Asia), Sherpastan (the Himalayas), and Cartelombia (South America), as well as such specialized guides as Travel for Germans, Family Vacations, Cycling the World, Hair Raising Drives, Arduous Walks, Travel for Seniors, Tax Havens, and Let's Go Game Hunting.
