= Ruritania =

Fictional country in central Europe

- First appearance: Prisoner of Zenda
- Created by: Anthony Hope

In-universe information
- Type: Country
- Location: Central Europe

Ruritania is a fictional country, originally located in Central Europe as a setting for a trilogy of novels by Anthony Hope, beginning with The Prisoner of Zenda (1894). Nowadays, the term connotes a quaint minor European country or is used as a placeholder name for an unspecified country in academic discussions. The first known use of the demonym Ruritanian was in 1896.

Hope's setting lent its name to a literary genre involving fictional countries, which is known as Ruritanian romance.

== Fictional country ==
Jurists specialising in international law and private international law use Ruritania and other fictional countries when describing a hypothetical case illustrating some legal point. Examples include:

- For example, Briggs (2019) writes in a legal textbook:

″[t]he question whether A obtained good title to a camera which he bought in Ruritania is governed by Ruritanian law, even if the camera had been delivered on hire purchase terms, or under a conditional sale to A’s seller in England.″

- In another legal textbook, Mortensen, Garnett & Keyes (2023) frequently use “Ruritania” as a placeholder-name when referring to a generic country in hypothetical scenarios in international law.
- Australian foreign minister Alexander Downer cited “Ruritania” as a fictional enemy when illustrating a security treaty between Australia and Indonesia signed on 8 November 2006:

"We do not need to have a security agreement with Indonesia so both of us will fight off the 'Ruritanians'. That's not what the relationship is about," he said. "It is all about working together on the threats that we have to deal with, which are different types of threats."

- A British court, when contemplating a publication ban relating to a childhood sexual assault case, referred to the country of origin of the child as “Ruritania”, further explaining, "The boy was described in the judgment as having 'dual British and “Ruritanian” nationality'."
- The well-known economist L. von Mises used “Ruritania” to discuss currency reform and other issues in economics,
  - M. Rothbard – a former student of von Mises – similarly used the fictional country in his own works. (Note: "One method of the birth of a State may be illustrated as follows: In the hills of southern “Ruritania”, a bandit group manages to obtain physical control over the territory, and finally the bandit chieftain proclaims himself “King of the sovereign and independent government of South Ruritania”; and, if he and his men have the force to maintain this rule for a while, lo and behold! a new State has joined the “family of nations,” and the former bandit leaders have been transformed into the lawful nobility of the realm." — Rothbard (2009))
- Polish politician Janusz Korwin-Mikke often uses "Poronia" and "Rurytania" to compare Poland to some western or utopian country.
- BBC radio used “Ruritania” in 1956, as a euphemism for Egypt during the Suez Crisis for on-air discussions of the crisis, in order to circumvent the terms of an agreement with the British government that prevented broadcasting details of the events before they were discussed in parliament.

== Central and southeastern Europe ==
Ruritania has also been used to describe the stereotypical development of nationalism in 19th-century Eastern Europe, by Ernest Gellner in Nations and Nationalism, in a pastiche of the historical narratives of nationalist movements among Poles, Czechs, Serbians, Romanians, etc. In this story, peasant Ruritanians living in the "Empire of Megalomania" developed national consciousness through the elaboration of a Ruritanian high culture by a small group of intellectuals responding to industrialization and labor migration.

Author and royal historian Theo Aronson, in his book Crowns in Conflict (1986), used the term to describe the semi-romantic and even tribal-like conditions of the Balkan and Romanian cultures before World War I. Walter Lippmann used the word to describe the stereotype that characterized the vision of international relations during and after the War.

Vesna Goldsworthy of Kingston University, in her book Inventing Ruritania: The Imperialism of the Imagination (Yale University Press, 1998), addresses the question of the impact of the work of novelists and film-makers in shaping international perceptions of the Balkans in the framework of an anti-Western type of modernism which has received much criticism from other academics. Goldsworthy's theories consider stories and movies about Ruritania to be a form of "literary exploitation" or "narrative colonization" of the peoples of the Balkans.

While discussing how new revolutionary leadership consciously or unconsciously may inherit certain elements of the previous regime, Benedict Anderson, in his book Imagined Communities, mentions among other examples "Josip Broz's revival of Ruritanian pomp and ceremony."

== See also ==
- Borduria and Syldavia
- Freedonia
- Grand Fenwick
- Latveria
- Lugash
- Orsinia
