= Fictional country =

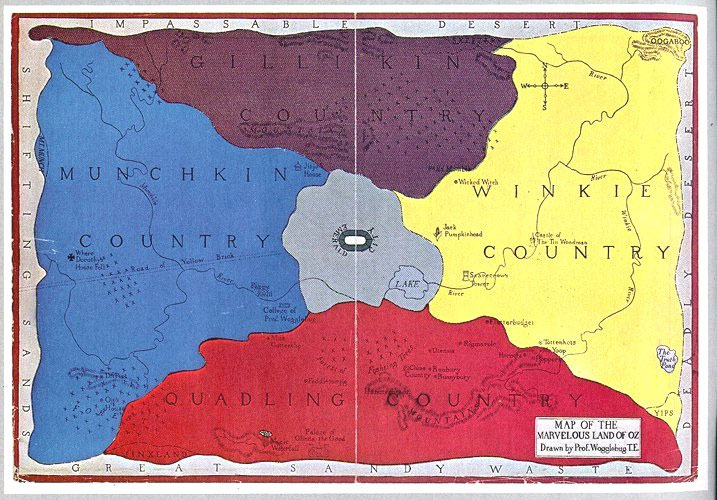
Map of the Land of Oz, the fictional country in the book The Wonderful Wizard of Oz

A fictional country is one that is invented for the purposes of a story and does not exist in real life, or one that people believe in without proof. Fictional lands appear most commonly as settings or subjects of myths, literature, film, video games, for fun or other fictional stories.

== Purposes ==
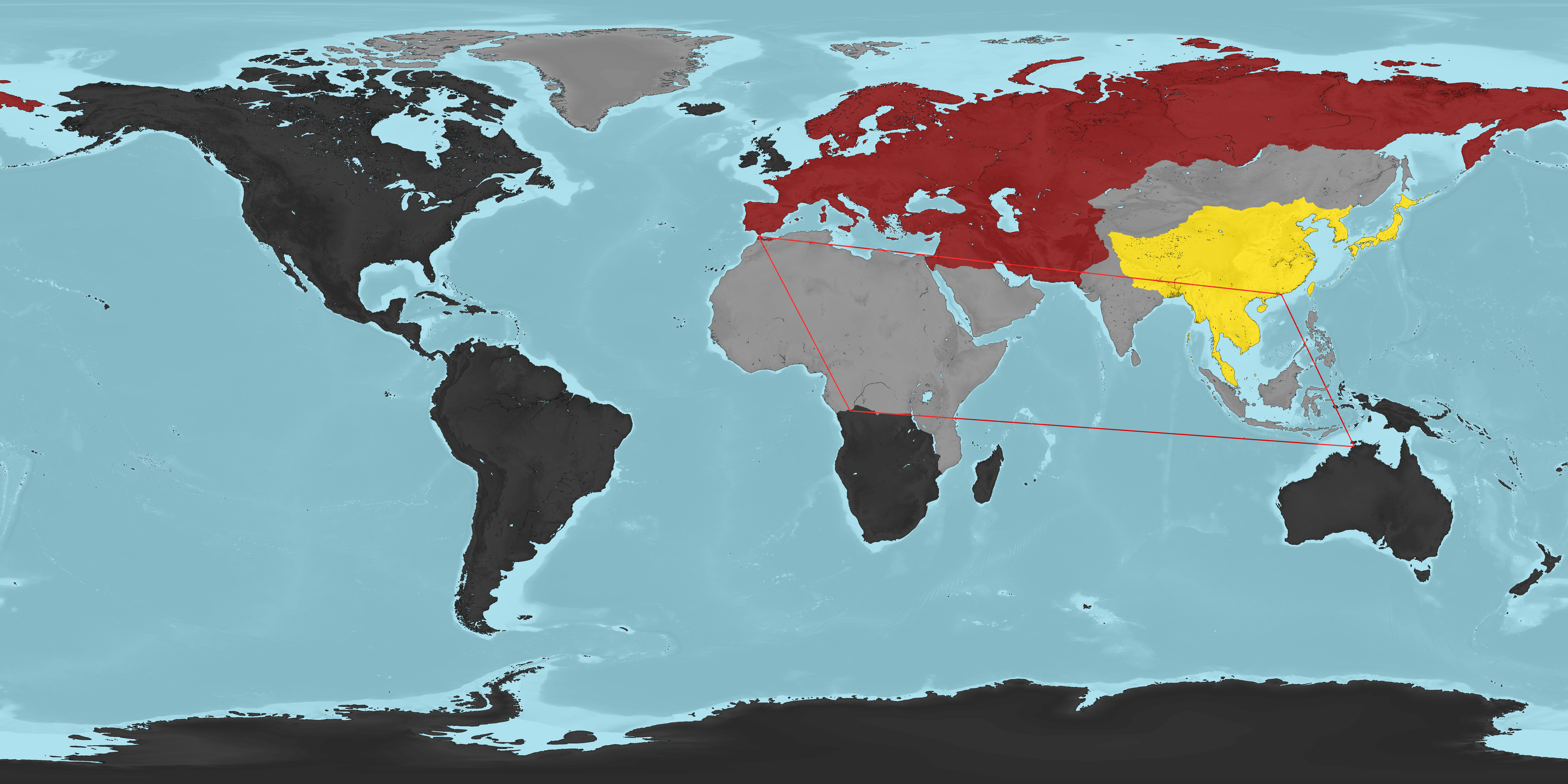
Fictitious countries from the novel Nineteen Eighty-Four. Dark grey represents Oceania, red represents Eurasia and yellow represents Eastasia.

Fictional countries often deliberately resemble or even represent some real-world country or present a utopia or dystopia for commentary. By using a fictional country instead of a real one, authors can exercise greater freedom in creating characters, events, and settings, while at the same time presenting a vaguely familiar locale that readers can recognize. A fictional country leaves the author unburdened by the restraints of a real nation's actual history, politics, and culture, and can thus allow for greater scope in plot construction and be exempt from criticism for vilifying or distorting good image of an actual nation, political party, or people. The fictional Tomania (a parody of Nazi Germany named after Ptomaine) serves as a setting for Charlie Chaplin's The Great Dictator.

Fictional countries appear commonly in stories of early science fiction (or scientific romance). Such countries supposedly form part of the normal Earth landscape, although not located in a normal atlas. Later similar tales often took place on fictional planets.

In Gulliver's Travels by Jonathan Swift, the protagonist, Lemuel Gulliver, visits various invented lands. Edgar Rice Burroughs placed the adventures of Tarzan in areas in Africa that, at the time, remained mostly unknown to the West and to the East. Isolated islands with strange creatures and/or customs enjoyed great popularity in these authors' times. By the 19th century, after Western explorers had surveyed most of the Earth's surface, fictional utopian and dystopian societies tended to be conceived on other planets in outer space, whether in human colonies or in alien societies. Fictional countries can also be used in stories set in a distant future, with other political borders than today.

Fictional countries are also invented for the purpose of military training scenarios, e.g. the group of islands around Hawaii were assigned the names Blueland and Orangeland in the international maritime exercise, RIMPAC 98.

They may also be used for technical reasons in actual reality for use in the development of specifications, such as the fictional country of Bookland, which is used to allow European Article Number "country" codes 978 and 979 to be used for ISBNs assigned to books, and code 977 to be assigned for use for ISSN numbers on magazines and other periodicals.

== Legendary countries ==
Countries from stories, myths, legends, that some believe to exist, or to have existed at some point:

- Atlantis
- Aztlán
- El Dorado
- Lemuria (continent)
- Lyonesse
- Mu (continent)
- Shangri-La or Shambhala

== See also ==
- List of fictional countries
- List of fictional African countries
- List of fictional American countries
- List of fictional Asian countries
- List of fictional European countries
- Fictional city
- Fictional companies
  - List of fictional companies
- Fictional geography
- Jennifer Government: NationStates
- List of fictional planets
- List of fictional universes
- List of lost lands
- Proposed country, includes several lists of proposed countries
- Worldbuilding

== Books ==
- Alberto Manguel & Gianni Guadalupi: The Dictionary of Imaginary Places. ISBN 0-15-626054-9
- Brian Stableford: The Dictionary of Science Fiction Places. Simon & Schuster, 1999. ISBN 978-0684849584
