= Japan in Gulliver's Travels =

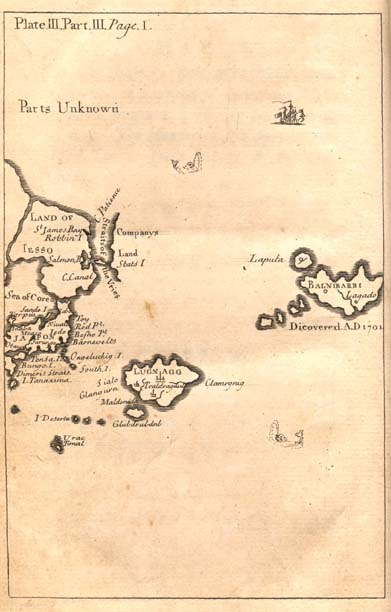
Map showing Japan, with Luggnagg, Balnibarbi and other lands to the east (original map, Pt III, Gulliver's Travels)

Japan is referred to in Gulliver's Travels, the 1726 satirical novel by Jonathan Swift.

Part III of the book has the account of Lemuel Gulliver's visit to Japan, the only real location visited by him. It is used as a venue for Swift's satire on the actions of Dutch traders to that land. His portrayal reflects the state of European understanding of the nation in the 17th and early 18th centuries, as well as the tensions caused by the English-Dutch trade rivalry at the period.

== Description ==
Japan is shown on the map at the beginning of part III, which also shows the island of "Yesso" (i.e. Hokkaido), "Stats island" (Iturup) and "Companys Land" (Urup) to the north. The map also marks the Vries Strait and Cape Patience, though this is shown on the northeast coast of Yesso, rather than as part of Sakhalin, which was little-known in Swift’s time. On the island of Japan itself the map shows "Nivato" (Nagato), Yedo (Edo), "Meaco" (Kyoto), Inaba and "Osacca" (Osaka).

The text describes Gulliver's journey from Luggnagg, which took fifteen days, and his landing at "Xamoschi" (i.e. Shimosa) which lies "on the western part of a narrow strait leading northward into a long arm of the sea, on the northwest part of which Yedo, the metropolis stands". This description matches the geography of Tokyo Bay, except that Shimosa is on the north, rather than the western, shore of the bay.

== Satire ==
Following early contacts with Portuguese and Spanish explorers and missionaries, Christianity became established in Japan in the 16th and 17th centuries. However, it became enmeshed in the civil disorder and wars of the pre-Shogun period and with the establishment of the Tokugawa shogunate was proscribed and fiercely repressed.

Japan adopted a closed-door policy and European traders were expelled. At this point the custom of e-fumi, "trampling on the crucifix", was introduced as a test for Christians, both in the country and for travellers arriving there. Higgins states that e-fumi "was at the suggestion of Dutch traders who had no scruple about doing so".

Swift satirizes the practice of the Dutch by having Gulliver request, with the backing of the king of Luggnagg, that he be excused from this test, despite claiming to be Dutch himself. He reports the Emperor of Japan was “a little surprised at this, as I was the first of my countrymen to make a scruple of the point” and that he "began to doubt that I was a real Hollander but suspected I might be a Christian", a satire on the Dutch trader who claimed he was "not a Christian but a Dutchman". The Emperor also warned that if the secret should be found out by Gulliver’s countrymen, the Dutch, they would assuredly cut his throat in the voyage.

On his arrival at "Nangasac" (Nagasaki), Gulliver was able to find passage on a ship, which Swift names the Amboyna, of Amsterdam, a reference to the place of a notorious massacre by the Dutch of ten English traders in 1623.
