= Lagado =

Fictional city in Jonathan Swift's Gulliver's Travels

- Gulliver's Travels location
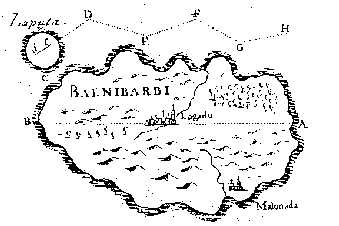
- Location of Lagado in Balnibarbi (original map, Pt III, Gulliver's Travels)
- Created by: Jonathan Swift
- Genre: Satire

In-universe information
- Type: City
- Locations: Academy of Lagado
- Character: Lord Munodi (former governor)

Lagado is a fictional city from the 1726 satirical novel Gulliver's Travels by Jonathan Swift.

== Location ==
Lagado is the capital of the nation Balnibarbi, which is ruled by a tyrannical king from a flying island called Laputa. Lagado is on the ground below Laputa, and also has access to Laputa at any given time to proceed in an attack or defense. It is located in the centre of the kingdom, some 150 miles from that land's Pacific coast.

== Description ==
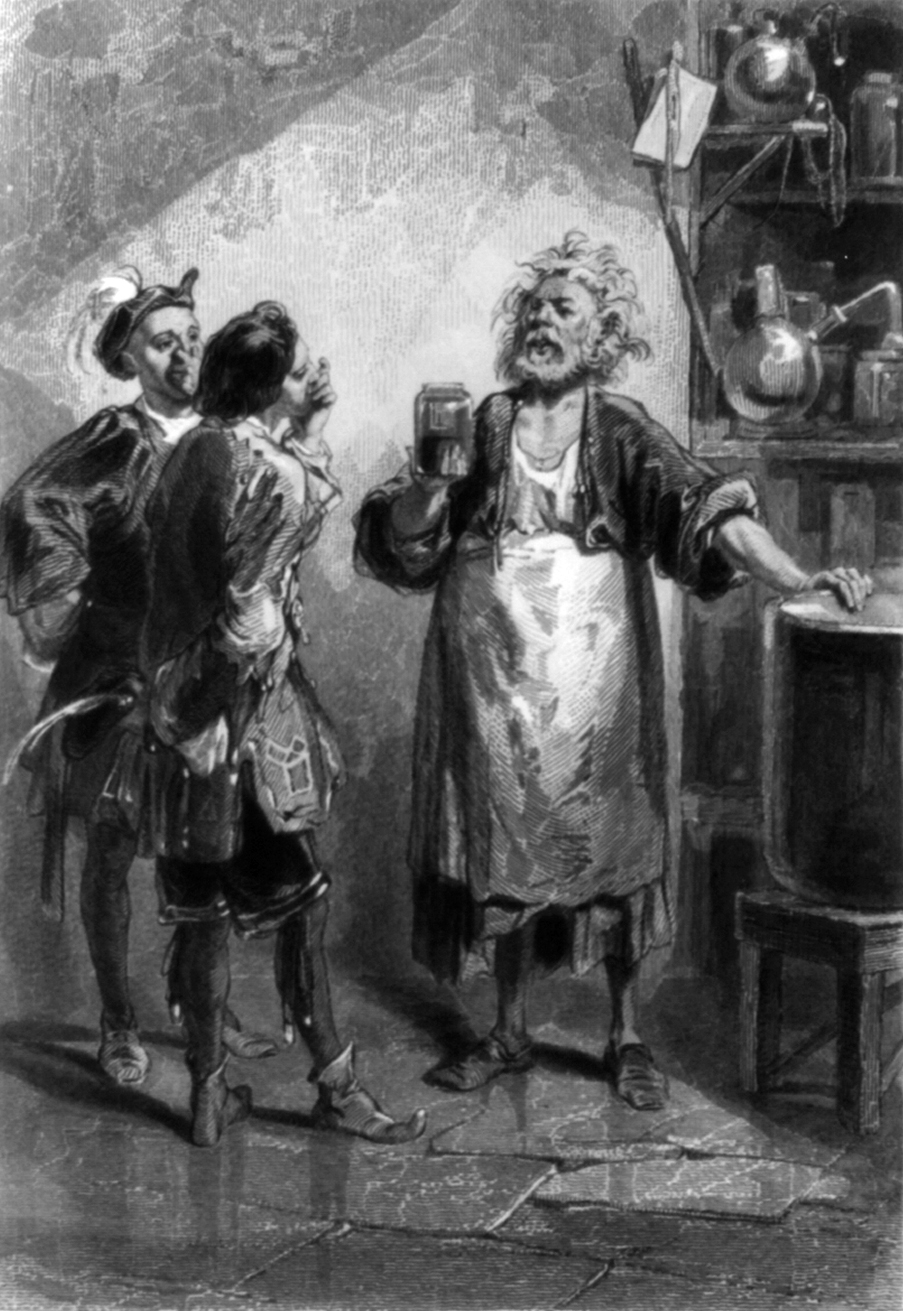
Gulliver in the academy of Lagado, from a French edition of Gulliver's Travels (1850s)

Lagado is poverty stricken like the rest of the nation. The king had invested a great fortune on building an Academy of Projectors in Lagado so that it shall contribute to the nation's development through research, but so far the Academy has yielded no result. The author has vividly described bizarre and seemingly pointless experiments conducted there, for example - trying to change human excretion back into food and trying to extract sunbeams out of cucumbers or teaching mathematics to pupils by writing propositions on wafers and consuming them with "cephalick tincture". Gulliver is clearly unimpressed with this academy and offers many suggestions to improve it. The author's ulterior motive on describing this place could possibly have been to point out the senseless side of science in his time. The Academy is home to The Engine, a fictitious device resembling a modern computer.

Gulliver's guide on Balnibarbi, Lord Munodi, a former governor of Lagado, is a rare case of a practical-minded man in the kingdom who runs his estate well and productively, but is seen as an oddity by other Laputans because he has no ear for music and must endure social ostracism.

== Legacy ==
On Mars's largest moon, Phobos, there is a planitia, Lagado Planitia, which is named after Swift's Lagado because of his 'prediction' of the two then undiscovered Martian moons, which his Laputan astronomers had discovered.

== See also ==
- Laputa
- Lindalino
- Gulliver's Travels
