= Glubbdubdrib =

Fictional island in Swift's Gulliver's Travels

- Gulliver's Travels location
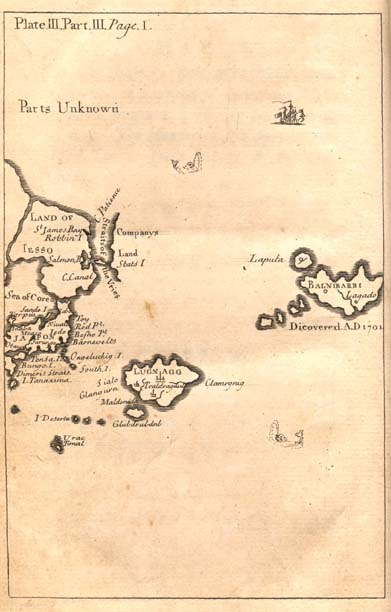
- Map of Glubbdubdrib, Lugnagg, and other lands east of Japan (original map, Pt III, Gulliver's Travels)
- Created by: Jonathan Swift
- Genre: Satire

In-universe information
- Type: Monarchy
- Ethnic group: Glubbdubdribians
- Locations: unknown (capital)

Glubbdubdrib (also spelled Glubdubdrib or Glubbdubdribb in some editions) was an island of sorcerers and magicians, one of the imaginary countries visited by Lemuel Gulliver in the 1726 satirical novel Gulliver's Travels by Anglo-Irish author Jonathan Swift. The episode on Glubbdubdrib "explores the theme of humanity's progressive degeneration."

== Location ==
The location of Glubdubdrib is illustrated in both the text and the map at the beginning of part III of Gulliver's Travels, though they are not consistent with each other. The map shows Glubdubdrib to be southwest of the port of Maldonada on the southwest coast of Luggnagg, while the text states the island is southwest of Balnibarbi, and Maldonada to be a port of that land.

== Description ==
Glubbdubdrib is about one third as large as the Isle of Wight. The inhabitants of Glubbdubdrib can wield magic, and most of their technology is utilized through magical means. The eldest in succession is prince or governor of the island. He has a 'noble' palace, and a park of about three thousand acres, surrounded by a wall of hewn stone twenty foot high.

On visiting Glubbdubdrib, Gulliver had the occasion, thanks to the power of their necromancers, to speak with Brutus of ancient Rome, whom Gulliver greatly admired, among many other famous historical personages, including Socrates. Many ideas of historians were corrected this way. Gulliver spends five days doing this, then three days looking at some of the 'modern' dead, trying to find the greatest figure in the past 200 or 300 years in his country and others in Europe. Gulliver gets a new view of historians and heroes, claiming 'I was chiefly disgusted with modern History'.
