= Houyhnhnm =

Fictional race of horses

- Gulliver's Travels race
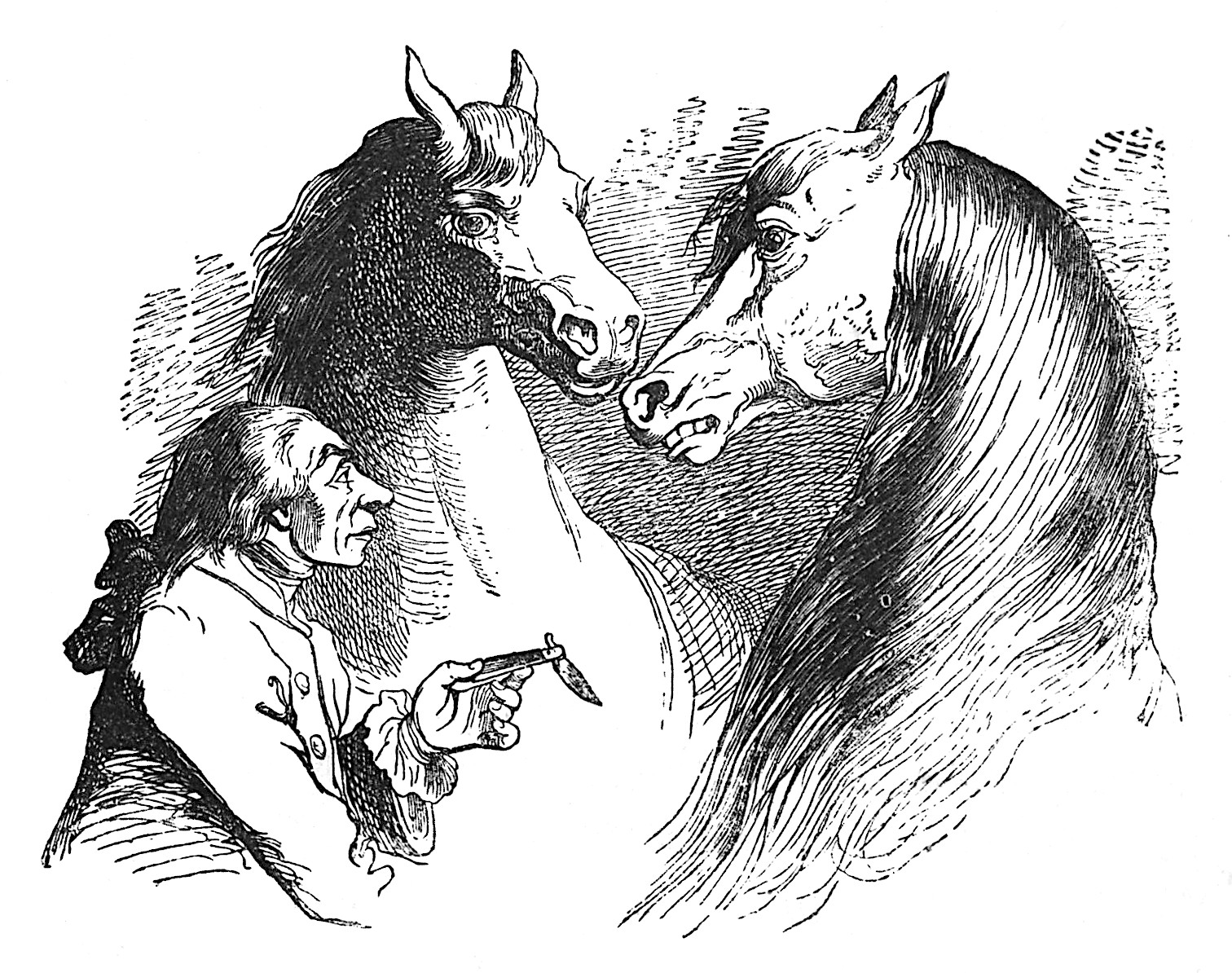
- Gulliver in discussion with Houyhnhnms (1856 lllustration by J.J. Grandville).
- First appearance: Gulliver's Travels

Houyhnhnms are a fictional race of intelligent horses described in the last part of Jonathan Swift's satirical 1726 novel Gulliver's Travels. The name is pronounced either /ˈhuːɪnəm/ or /ˈhwɪnəm/. Swift apparently intended all words of the Houyhnhnm language to echo the neighing of horses.

== Description ==
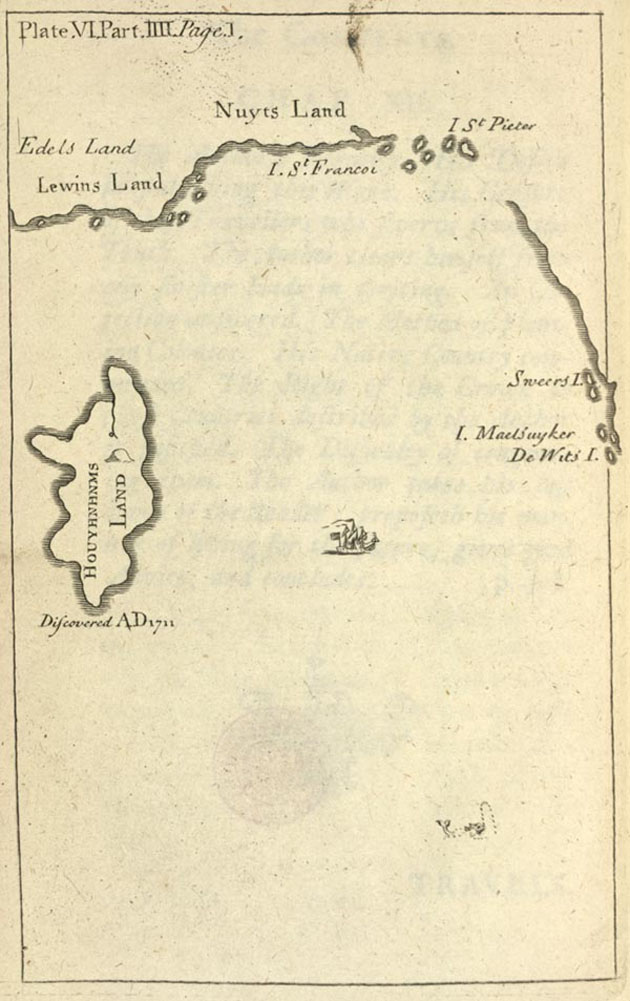
Map of Houyhnhnms Land (original map, Pt IV, Gulliver's Travels), showing its location south of New Holland (Australia).

Gulliver's visit to the Land of the Houyhnhnms is described in Part IV of his Travels, and its location illustrated on the map at the start of Part IV.

The map shows Houyhnhnms Land to be south of Australia; it indicates Edels Land and Lewins Land to the north, and Nuyts Land to the north-east, on the mainland with the islands of St Francis and St Pieter further east, and Sweers, Maatsuyker and De Wit islands to the east. The map is somewhat careless with the scale, however; Edels Land to Lewins Land are shown adjacent, while in reality they are some 1000 km apart, while the sweep of the Great Australian Bight, from Cape Leeuwin, Australia's south-westerly point to the Maatsuyker Islands, off the southern tip of Tasmania, is over 3000 km.

Gulliver describes the land as "divided by long rows of trees, not regularly planted but naturally growing", with a "great plenty of grass, and several fields of oats".

The Houyhnhnms are rational equine beings and are masters of the land, contrasting strongly with the Yahoos, savage humanoid creatures who are no better than beasts of burden, or livestock. Whereas the Yahoos represent all that is bad about humans, Houyhnhnms have a settled, calm, reliable and rational society. Gulliver much prefers the Houyhnhnms' company to the Yahoos', even though the latter are biologically closer to him.

== Interpretation ==
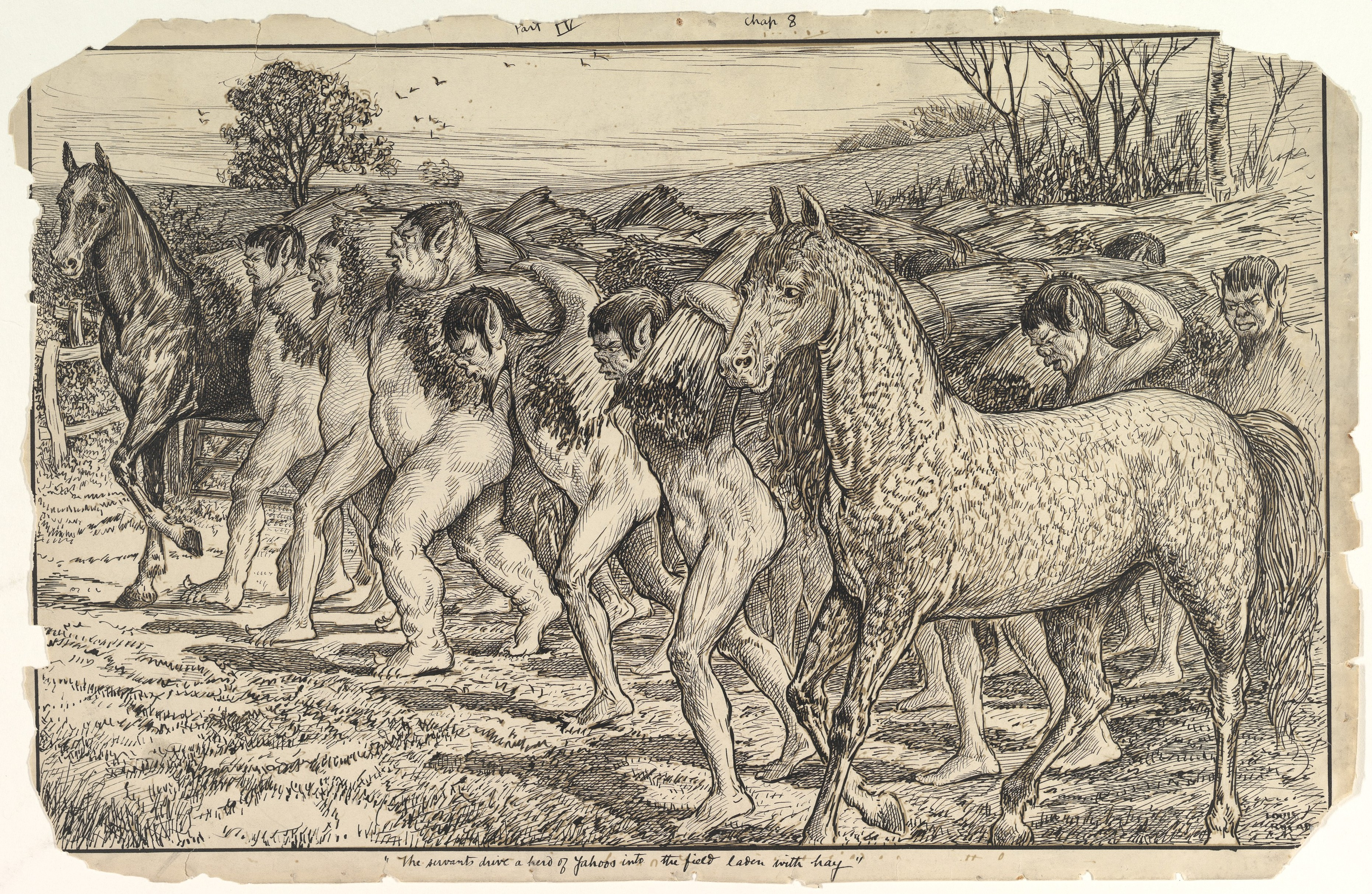
Houyhnhnms driving a herd of Yahoos, Metropolitan Museum of Art

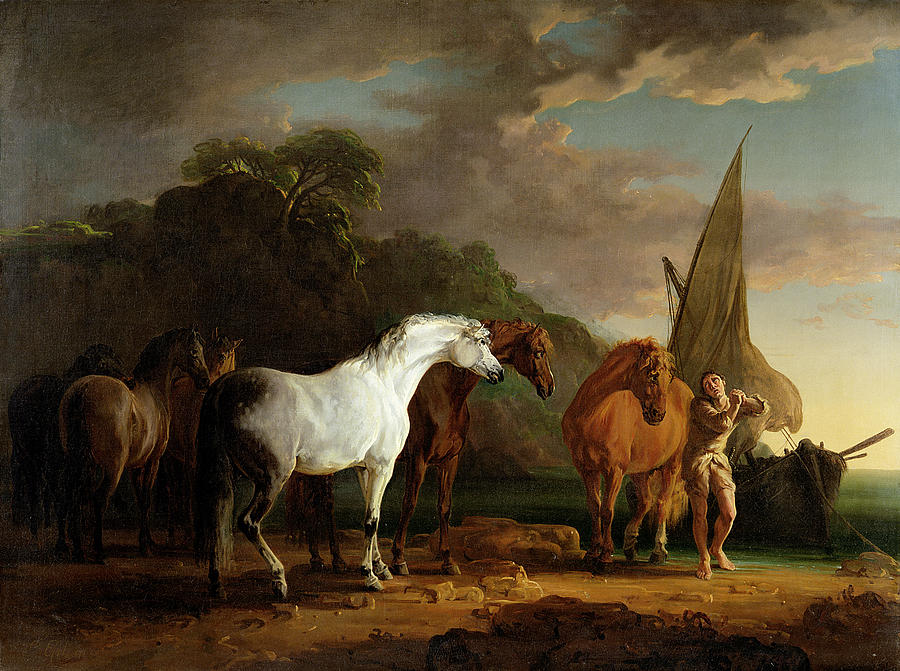
Gulliver Taking His Final Leave of the Land of the Houyhnhnms, Sawrey Gilpin, 1769

It is possible to interpret the Houyhnhnms in a number of different ways. One interpretation could be a sign of Swift's liberal views on race, or one could regard Gulliver's preference (and his immediate division of Houyhnhnms into color-based hierarchies) as absurd and the sign of his self-deception. It is now generally accepted that the story involving the Houyhnhnms embody a wholly pessimistic view of the place of man and the meaning of his existence in the universe. In a modern context the story might be seen as presenting an early example of animal rights concerns, especially in Gulliver's account of how horses are cruelly treated in his society and the reversal of roles. The story is a possible inspiration for Pierre Boulle's novel Planet of the Apes.

Critics have traditionally answered the question whether Gulliver is insane (and thus just another victim of Swift's satire) by questioning whether or not the Houyhnhnms are truly admirable, and in doing this analysis, view Book IV as the "central interpretive problem" of the text. Gulliver loves the land and is obedient to a race that is not like his own. The Houyhnhnm society is based upon reason, and only upon reason, and therefore the horses practice eugenics based on their analyses of benefit and cost. They have no religion and their sole morality is the defence of reason, and so they are not particularly moved by pity or a belief in the intrinsic value of life. Gulliver himself, in their company, builds the sails of his skiff from "Yahoo skins". The Houyhnhnms' lack of passion surfaces during the scheduled visit of "a friend and his family" to the home of Gulliver's master "upon some affair of importance". On the day of the visit, the mistress of his friend and her children arrive very late. She made no excuses "first for her husband" who had died just that morning and she had to remain to make the proper arrangements for a "convenient place where his body should be laid". Gulliver remarked that "she behaved herself at our house as cheerfully as the rest". A further example of the lack of humanity and emotion in the Houyhnhnms is that their laws reason that each couple produce two children, one male and one female. In the event that a marriage produced two offspring of the same sex, the parents would take their children to the annual meeting and trade one with a couple who produced two children of the opposite sex. This was viewed as his spoofing and or criticising the notion that the "ideal" family produces children of both sexes. George Orwell viewed the Houyhnhnm society as one whose members try to be as close to dead as possible while alive and matter as little as possible in life and death.

On one hand, the Houyhnhnms have a seemingly orderly and peaceful society. They have a philosophy and a language that is entirely absent of political and ethical basis (or a supposed lack need for such). They have no word for a lie (and must substitute a circumlocution: "to say a thing which is not", thus technically being able to have terms for lies). They also have a form of art that is derived from nature. Outside Gulliver's Travels, Swift had expressed longstanding concern over the corruption of the English language, and he had proposed language reform. He had also, in Battle of the Books and in general in A Tale of a Tub, expressed a preference for the Ancients (Classical authors) because their art was based directly upon nature, and not upon other art.

On the other hand, Swift was profoundly mistrustful of attempts at reason that resulted in either hubris (for example, the Projectors satirised in A Tale of a Tub or in Book III of Gulliver's Travels) or immorality (such as the speaker of A Modest Proposal, who offers an seemingly entirely logical and wholly immoral and amoral proposal for cannibalism). The Houyhnhnms embody both the apparently good and the bad side of reason, for they have the "pure" language Swift wished for and the amorally rationalist approach to solving the problems of humanity (Yahoos); the extirpation of the Yahoo population by the horses is very like the aspirations of the speaker of A Modest Proposal.

In the shipping lanes he is rescued by a Portuguese sea captain, a level-headed individual albeit full of concern for others, whose temperament at one level appears intermediate between the calm, rational Houyhnhnms of Houyhnhnmland and the norm of corrupt, European humanity, which Gulliver no longer distinguishes from Houyhnhnmland's wild Yahoos. Gulliver can speak with him, and though now disaffected from all humanity, he began to tolerate his company. Gulliver is returned to his home and family, finds their smell and look intolerable and all his countrymen no better than "Yahoos", purchases and converses with two stabled horses, tolerating the stable boy, and assures the reader of his account's utter veracity.

== See also ==
- Brobdingnag
- Lilliput and Blefuscu
- List of fictional horses
- Struldbrug
- Yahoo (Gulliver's Travels)
