= Grga =

Grga or Grgo are Croatian variants of "Gregory" (Latin: Gregorius, Greek: Grēgorios), found in Croatia, Bosnia and Herzegovina and Serbia.

It may refer to:

- Budislav Grga Angjelinović (1886–1946), Croatian politician and lawyer
- Grgo Gamulin (1910–1997), Croatian art historian, literary critic and writer
- Grgo Ilijić (1736–1813), Bosnian Franciscan friar and bishop
- Grgo Kusić (1892–1918), Croatian soldier
- Grgo Martić (1822-1905), Bosnian Croat friar and writer
- Grga Novak (1888-1978), Croatian historian
- Grgo Petrović (1883–1945) birth name of Leo Petrović, Bosnian Franciscan and historian
- Grga Rupčić (1932-2008), Croatian poet and essayist
- Grga Tuškan (1862–1923), Croatian politician and lawyer

== See also ==
- Grgur, given name
- Grgić, surname
