= The Engine =

Fictional computational machine in Gulliver's Travels

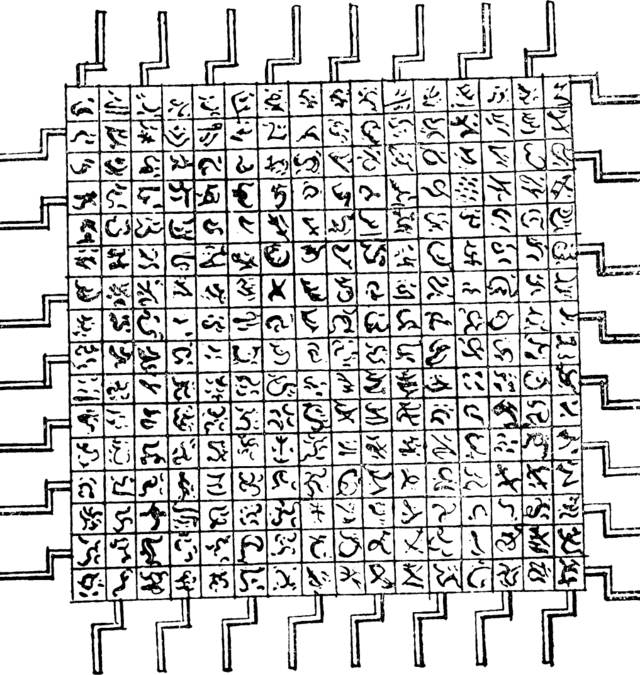
Illustration of The Engine from an edition of Gulliver's Travels

The Engine is a fictional device for writing books described in the 1726 satirical novel Gulliver's Travels by Jonathan Swift. Eric A. Weiss suggests that it is an early reference to a device resembling what is now known as artificial intelligence.

The Engine is a device that generates permutations of word sets. It is found at the Academy of Projectors in Lagado on the flying island of Laputa. It is described thus by Swift:

“... Every one knew how laborious the usual method is of attaining to arts and sciences; whereas, by his contrivance, the most ignorant person, at a reasonable charge, and with a little bodily labour, might write books in philosophy, poetry, politics, laws, mathematics, and theology, without the least assistance from genius or study.” He then led me to the frame, about the sides, whereof all his pupils stood in ranks. It was twenty feet square, placed in the middle of the room. The superfices was composed of several bits of wood, about the bigness of a die, but some larger than others. They were all linked together by slender wires. These bits of wood were covered, on every square, with paper pasted on them; and on these papers were written all the words of their language, in their several moods, tenses, and declensions; but without any order. The professor then desired me “to observe; for he was going to set his engine at work.” The pupils, at his command, took each of them hold of an iron handle, whereof there were forty fixed round the edges of the frame; and giving them a sudden turn, the whole disposition of the words was entirely changed. He then commanded six-and-thirty of the lads, to read the several lines softly, as they appeared upon the frame; and where they found three or four words together that might make part of a sentence, they dictated to the four remaining boys, who were scribes. This work was repeated three or four times, and at every turn, the engine was so contrived, that the words shifted into new places, as the square bits of wood moved upside down."

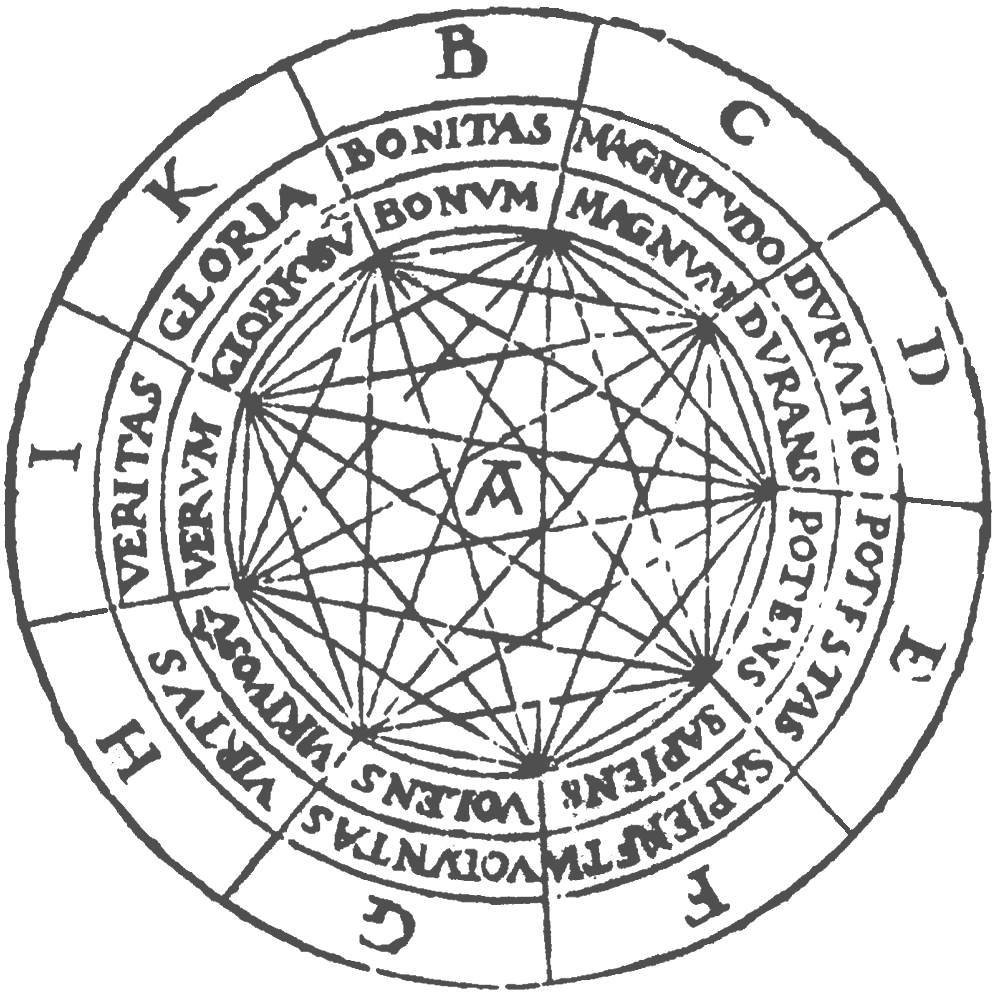
One of Llull's discs

Cultural historian Anthony Bonner posited that the story is a satire on Ars Magna (early 14th century) of medieval philosopher Ramon Llull.

== See also ==
- Infinite monkey theorem – Counterintuitive result in probability
- SCIgen – Random text generating software
- Large language model – Type of machine learning model
