= Gligorije =

Gligorije (Serbian: Глигорије) is a masculine given name. It may refer to:

- Gligorije Elezović (1879–1960), Serbian historian
- Gligorije Trlajić (1766–1811), Serbian writer, poet, polyglot and professor

== See also ==
- Grigorije
- Grgur
