= Yahoo (Gulliver's Travels) =

Fictional being

- Gulliver's Travels race
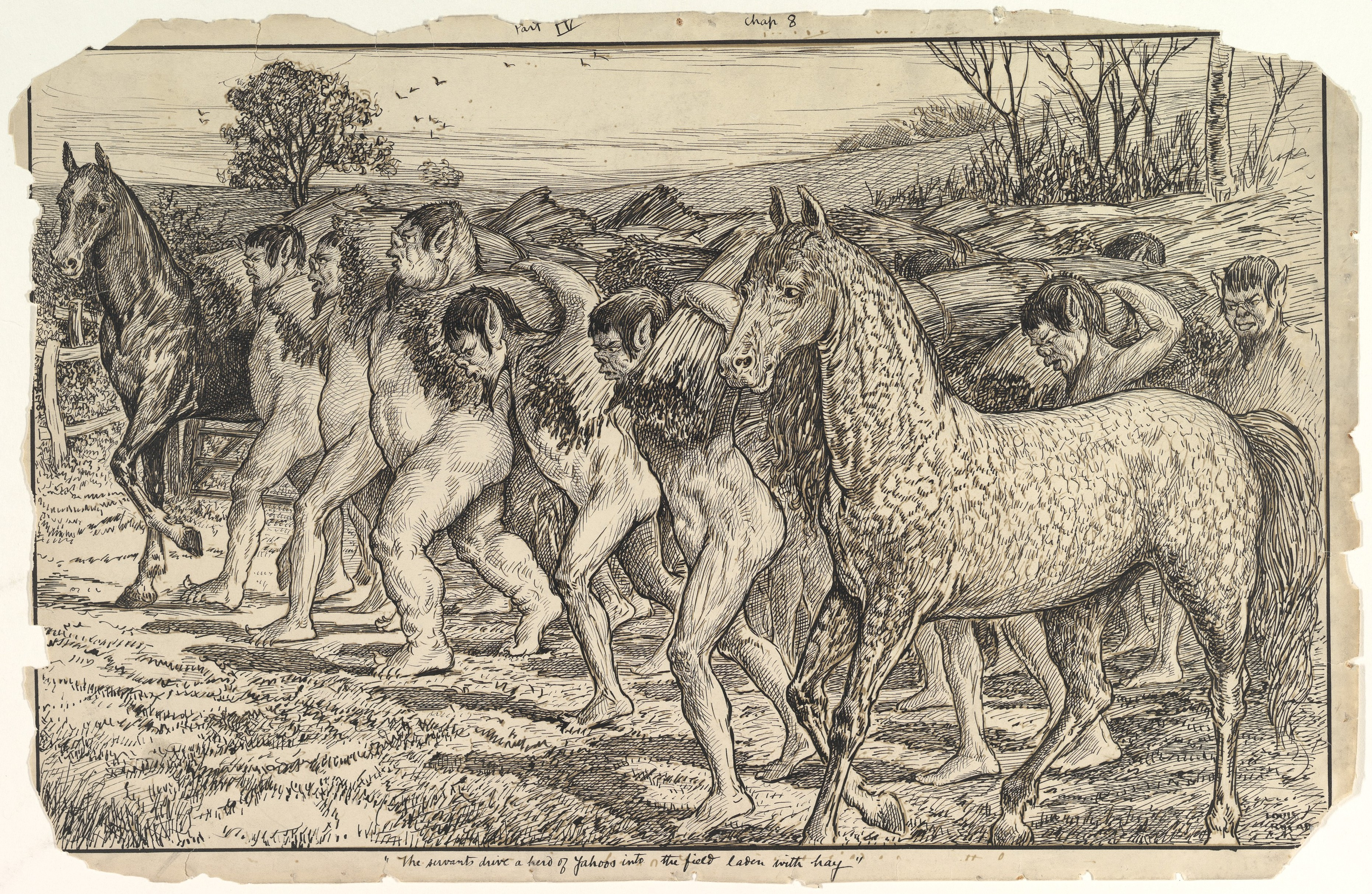
- The Servants Drive a Herd of Yahoos into the Field by Louis John Rhead, Metropolitan Museum of Art
- First appearance: Gulliver's Travels

Yahoos are legendary human beings in the 1726 satirical novel Gulliver's Travels written by Jonathan Swift. Their behaviour and character representation is meant to comment on the state of Europe from Swift's point of view. The word "yahoo" was coined by Jonathan Swift in the fourth section of Gulliver's Travels and has since entered the English language more broadly.

Swift describes Yahoos as filthy with unpleasant habits, "a brute in human form," resembling human beings far too closely for the liking of protagonist Lemuel Gulliver. He finds the calm and rational society of intelligent horses, the Houyhnhnms, greatly preferable.

The Yahoos are primitive creatures obsessed with "pretty stones" that they find by digging in mud, thus representing the distasteful materialism and ignorant elitism Swift encountered in Britain. Hence the term "yahoo" has come to mean "a crude, brutish or obscenely coarse person".

== In popular culture ==
- The American frontiersman Daniel Boone, who often used terms from Gulliver's Travels, claimed that he killed a hairy giant that he called a Yahoo.
- The fictitious country of Yahoo was the setting for Bertolt Brecht's 1936 play Round Heads and Pointed Heads.
- Yahoos were referred to in a letter sent by serial killer David Berkowitz to New York City police while committing the "Son of Sam" murders in 1976.
- Brazilian poet João Cabral de Melo Neto used the term Yahoo as a metaphor for the rude northeastern Brazilian men in two poems called "The Country of the Houyhnhnms", in his book "Education by the Stone".
