= Grgić =

Grgić is a Serbo-Croatian surname, a patronymic derived from the given name Grga or Grgur (Gregory).

It is the most common surname in the Požega-Slavonia County in Croatia, and among the most frequently found surnames in two other counties. Common in Croatia, it is also found in Bosnia and Herzegovina and Serbia. About 7500 people with family name Grgić live in Croatia today, family name Grgić (including: Grgic, Grgich, Gergich, Gergics, Gergick, Ghergich, Gergic and Gergicz) is present in 32 countries worldwide.

Notable people with last name Grgić:

- Alen Grgić (born 1994), Croatian footballer
- Berislav Grgić (born 1960), Norwegian Catholic bishop from Bosnia
- Brent Grgic (born 1979), Australian footballer
- Dimitrije Grgić (born 1984), Serbian sports shooter
- Ilija Grgic (born 1972), Australian Footballer
- Luka Grgić (born 1995), Serbian footballer
- Goran Grgić (born 1965), Croatian actor
- Marko Grgić (footballer) (born 1987), Croatian footballer
- Marina Veličković née Grgić (fl. 1860–1913), Serbian nurse
- Miljenko Grgić (born 1923), Croatian-American winemaker
- Stipe Bačelić-Grgić (born 1988), Croatian footballer
- Velimir Grgić (born 1978), Croatian footballer
- Zlatko Grgić (1931–1988), Croatian animator

== See also ==
- Grgurević, surname
