= Grgo Kusić =

Grgo Kusić (1892 – 1918) was a Croat soldier in the Austro-Hungarian Army. According to some accounts, Kusić was 2.37 m (7 ft 9 in) tall, and is frequently cited as the tallest Croat ever, as well as the tallest soldier of the Austro-Hungarian Army. However, other accounts put his height at 2.18 m (7 ft 2 in), so the exact figure is not known for certain.

Known as the "Gulliver of Dalmatia", the Grabovac native was a personal imperial guard to emperor Franz Joseph I of Austria in Vienna.
