= Grigorije =

Grigorije (Serbian Cyrillic: Григорије) is a Serbian masculine given name, a variant of Greek Grēgorios (Γρηγόριος, Latin: Gregorius, English: Gregory) meaning "watchful, alert". It has been used in Serbian society since the Middle Ages. It may refer to:

- Grigorije the Pupil (fl. 1186), author of Miroslav Gospel
- Elder Grigorije (fl. 1310–1355), Serbian nobleman, Orthodox cleric and writer.
- Grigorije Camblak (ca. 1365–1420), Eastern Orthodox cleric and Bulgarian and Serbian writer
- Grigorije of Gornjak (fl. 1375–79), Serbian Orthodox monk
- Grigorije Račanin (fl. 1639), Serbian writer
- Grigorije Durić (1966), Serbian Orthodox bishop

== See also ==
- Gligorije
- Grgur

== Sources ==
- Grković, Milica (1977). Rečnik ličnih imena kod Srba. Belgrade: Vuk Karadžić.
