= Balnibarbi =

Fictional land in Jonathan Swift's 1726 novel Gulliver's Travels

- Gulliver's Travels location
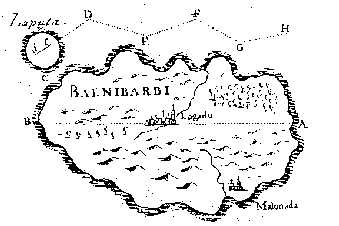
- Balnibarbi (original map, Pt III Gulliver's Travels) showing the location of Laputa the flying island, Lagado the capital, and Malonada, the main port.
- Created by: Jonathan Swift
- Genre: Satire

In-universe information
- Type: City
- Locations: Academy of Lagado
- Character: Lord Munodi (former governor)

Balnibarbi is a fictional land in Jonathan Swift's 1726 satirical novel Gulliver's Travels. it was visited by Lemuel Gulliver after he was rescued by the people of the flying island of Laputa.

== Location ==
The location of Balnibarbi is illustrated in both the text and the map at the beginning of part III of Gulliver's Travels, though they are not consistent with each other. The map shows Balnibarbi to be an island to the east of Japan and to the northeast of Luggnagg. The text states that the kingdom of Balnibarbi is part of a continent which extends itself "eastward to that unknown tract of America westward of California and northward of the Pacific Ocean", and places it southeast of Luggnagg, which is "situated to the North-West". Gulliver gives his last known position (taken the morning “an hour before” he was captured by the pirates who set him adrift) as 46°N 183°(E) (i.e. east of Japan, south of the Aleutian Islands) and was picked up by the inhabitants of Laputa just 5 days later, having drifted south-south-east down a chain of small rocky islands Gulliver also tells us that the island of Laputa flies by the “magnetick virtue” of certain minerals in the ground of Balnibarbi and does not extend more than four miles above, and six leagues beyond the limit of the kingdom. He states the Pacific coast, where lies the port of Maldonada, is not above one hundred and fifty miles from the capital, Lagado.

== Description ==
Gulliver describes the land of Balnibarbi as "a land unhappily cultivated, with houses ill-contrived and ruinous, and its people’s countenances expressing misery and want". He found its method of farming "unaccountable".

The exception to this was the estate of his guide, the Lord Munodi, a person of the first rank who had been governor of Lagado, but had been dismissed for insufficiency by a cabal of ministers. He had been treated with tenderness by the king, but held in low understanding. These estates were wholly different to the land as a whole, being "a most beautiful country, with houses neatly built, fields enclosed, containing vineyards, corn-grounds and meadows". However Munodi reported that he was under pressure to tear down his house and tenant farms and rebuild them in the modern manner, or be censured for pride and incur the wrath of his majesty.

Munodi explained that some forty years previously, some persons from the land had travelled to the flying island, and having come back with ”a very little smattering of mathematicks” but full of “volatile spirits” acquired in that region, had come to dislike the management of all things below, and fell to forming schemes to put “all arts, sciences, languages and mechanicks” on a new footing. To this end they had created an Academy of Projectors, from which a steady stream of projects, designed to let “one man do the works of ten” and “let the fruits of the earth come to maturity at whatever season” thought fit, and to increase production “an hundred-fold”, to “let a palace be built in a week”, and to create materials “so durable as to last forever”. Unfortunately, the only inconvenience being that none of these projects were yet brought to perfection, and in the meantime the whole country lay waste.

== Maldonada ==
Maldonada is a fictional city described as the main port of Balnibarbi. Its location is illustrated in both the text and the maps in Part III of Gulliver's Travels, though they are not consistent with each other. Maldonada is described in the text as being 150 miles from the capital, Lagado, on the kingdom's Pacific coast (i.e., to the south) and that the island of Luggnagg, which is 100 leagues distant to the north-west. and is said to be 5 leagues distant from the island of Glubdubdrib, to the southwest. However, the map at the beginning of Pt III places Maldonada on the south-west coast of Luggnagg, with Glubdubdrib to the southwest of that island. A further map, of the kingdom of Balnibarbi shows the port again, on the kingdom's south-east coast, but names it “Malonada”.

Maldonada is described as being “a good port, with much commerce with the great kingdom of Luggnagg”. Gulliver tells us it is “about as large as Portsmouth”. Maldonada was Gulliver's departure point for his visit to Glubdubdrib, and later, on his return, for his voyage to Luggnagg.

== Satire ==
The target of Swift's satire in Balnibarbi is its “Projectors” (who are described as "inventors or planners of political, social, financial or scientific schemes... which are wild or impractical") rather than science per se, which is generally commended: He also “aim(s) to discredit the Newtonian Whig intelligentsia...and to ridicule anything remotely connected to the Dutch”: Higgins reports scholars have identified the academy as referring to the Royal Society in London, the Dublin Philosophical Society, and the University of Leiden. Higgins further states that Swift's satire “describes or is based on actual contemporary experiments reported (by) the Royal Society”.
