= Grgurević =

Grgurević is a Serbo-Croatian surname, a patronymic derived from Grgur. It may refer to:

- Ante Grgurević (1975–2026), Croatian basketballer
- Vuk Grgurević (1440–1485), titular Despot of Serbia
- Vukašin Grgurević, Bosnian nobleman
