= Struldbrugg =

Decrepit immortal

- Gulliver's Travels race
- illustrated by Grandville in the 1838 Paris edition
- First appearance: Gulliver's Travels

Illustrated by Rhead in the 1913 Harper edition

In Jonathan Swift's 1726 satirical novel Gulliver's Travels, the name struldbrugg (sometimes spelled struldbrug) is given to those humans in the nation of Luggnagg who are born seemingly normal, but are in fact immortal. Although struldbruggs do not die, they do continue aging. Swift's work depicts the evil of physical immortality without eternal youth.

A struldbrugg is easily recognized by a red dot above his left eyebrow, at birth, which changes to black in old age; a struldbrugg is a normal human being until he reaches the age of eighty, when he becomes legally dead. Swift was at pains to point out the difference between Gulliver's idealistic views of the benefits of immortality, and the painful reality of it:

After this preface, he gave me a particular account of the struldbrugs among them. He said "they commonly acted like mortals till about thirty years old; after which, by degrees, they grew melancholy and dejected, increasing in both till they came to fourscore. This he learned from their own confession; for otherwise, there not being above two or three of that species born in an age, they were too few to form a general observation by. When they came to fourscore years, which is reckoned the extremity of living in this country, they had not only all the follies and infirmities of other old men, but many more, which arose from the dreadful prospect of never dying. They were not only opinionative, peevish, covetous, morose, vain, talkative; but incapable of friendship, and dead to all natural affection, which never descended below their grandchildren. Envy, and impotent desires, are their prevailing passions. But those objects against which their envy seems principally directed, are the vices of the younger sort, and the deaths of the old. By reflecting on the former, they find themselves cut off from all possibility of pleasure; and whenever they see a funeral they lament and repine that others are gone to a harbour of rest, to which they themselves never can hope to arrive. They have no remembrance of anything but what they learned and observed in their youth and middle age, and even that is very imperfect; and for the truth or particulars of any fact it is safer to depend on common tradition, than upon their best recollections. The least miserable among them appear to be those who turn to dotage, and entirely lose their memories; these meet with more pity and assistance, because they want many bad qualities which abound in others.

"Dead" struldbruggs were forbidden to own property:

As soon as they have completed the term of eighty years, they are looked on as dead in law; their heirs immediately succeed to their estates; only a small pittance is reserved for their support; and the poor ones are maintained at the public charge. After that period, they are held incapable of any employment of trust or profit; they cannot purchase lands, or take leases; neither are they allowed to be witnesses in any cause, either civil or criminal or economic, not even for the decision of meers (metes) and bounds.

Because:

Otherwise, as avarice is the necessary consequence of old age, those immortals would in time become proprietors of the whole nation, and engross the civil power, which, for want of abilities to manage, must end in the ruin of the public.

== Related myths ==
Chinese Taoism placed the Island of the Immortals eastward from China, while Swift places the struldbruggs near Japan.

The term struldbrug (with one "g") has been used in science fiction, most prolifically by Larry Niven, Robert Silverberg, and Pohl & Kornbluth to describe supercentenarians.

Cited in Angela Thirkell's Jutland Cottage, Chapter 10, in a conversation between Dr. Ford and Mr. Macfadyen. (Moyer Bell, 1999)(ISBN 978155921273).

== See also ==
- Brobdingnag
- Tithonus
