= Lindalino =

- Gulliver's Travels location
- Created by: Jonathan Swift
- Genre: Satire

In-universe information
- Type: City

Lindalino is a fictional city from the 1726 satirical novel Gulliver's Travels by Jonathan Swift. Lindalino successfully revolted against the flying island of Laputa. The name Lindalino is a play on words of Dublin.

Laputa had several methods of enforcing obedience from its subject towns. The island could be made to hover over a city indefinitely, depriving them of sunlight and rain. In more extreme situations, this would be combined with dropping large rocks on the inhabitants. Finally, the Laputans had the ability to lower their island directly onto a town, utterly destroying it. This was exceedingly rare, due to the risk it would pose to the integrity of Laputa itself.

As a result of oppressions and tribute demanded from them by Laputa, the Lindalinians rebelled against their governor and constructed tall towers at each of the four corners of the city. On top of these, they placed powerful lodestones, or magnets. The result of this was that when Laputa approached them, it was pulled toward these towers more swiftly than the king had expected. As a test, the Laputans then dropped several pieces of adamant, the substance from which their island was constructed. These were violently drawn to the towers. Realizing the situation, the king of Laputa had no choice but to give in to Lindalino's conditions. If he had not, the island would have been fixed in place and overthrown.

The story of Lindalino is an allegory for Great Britain's impositions on Ireland. Swift had earlier written a series of pamphlets, known as Drapier's Letters, to rouse public opinion on the matter. Lindalino represents Dublin, and the impositions of Laputa represent the British imposition of William Wood's currency.

Early publications of Gulliver's Travels, including those by Benjamin Motte and George Faulkner, did not include the passage relating to Lindalino, for fear of political reprisal. It was not until 1899 that the passage was finally included in a new edition of the Collected Works. Modern editions derive from the Faulkner edition with the inclusion of this 1899 addendum.
