= Grgur =

Grgur (Serbian Cyrillic: Гргур) is a Serbo-Croatian masculine given name, a variant of Greek Grēgorios (Γρηγόριος, Latin: Gregorius, English: Gregory) meaning "watchful, alert". It has been used in Serbian society since the Middle Ages. It may refer to:

- Grgur Ninski (fl. 925-929), Croatian bishop
- Grgur III Šubić Bribirski (d. 1235), Croatian nobleman
- Grgur Kurjaković (fl. 1325), Croatian nobleman
- Grgur Preljub (1312–1355), Serbian nobleman
- Grgur Golubić (fl. 1347-1361), Serbian nobleman
- Grgur Branković (1415–1459), Serbian nobleman
- Grgur Vukosalić (d. 1436), Serbian nobleman
- Grgur Radoš (b. 1988), Croatian footballer

== See also ==
- Other Serbo-Croatian variants and diminutives include Grigorije, Grigor, Grga, etc.
- Grgurević, surname
- Grgić, surname
- Sveti Grgur, an uninhabited island in Croatia
- Grgurići, a village in Bosnia and Herzegovina

== Sources ==
- Grković, Milica (1977). Rečnik ličnih imena kod Srba. Belgrade: Vuk Karadžić.
