= Luggnagg =

Fictional island in Swift's Gulliver's Travels

- Gulliver's Travels location
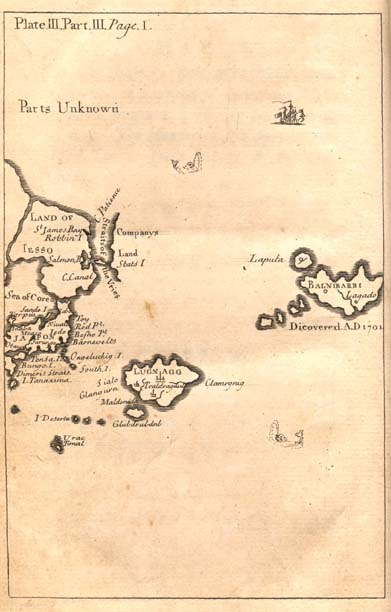
- Map of Glubbdubdrib, Lugnagg, and other lands east of Japan (original map, Pt III, Gulliver's Travels)
- Created by: Jonathan Swift
- Genre: Satire

In-universe information
- Type: Monarchy
- Ethnic group: Luggnaggians
- Locations: Traldragdubb or Trildrogdrib (capital)

Luggnagg is an island kingdom, one of the imaginary countries visited by Lemuel Gulliver in the 1726 satirical novel Gulliver's Travels by Anglo-Irish author Jonathan Swift.

== Location ==
The location of Luggnagg is illustrated in both the text and the map at the beginning of part III of Gulliver's Travels, though they are not consistent with each other. According to the map, Luggnagg is southeast of Japan and southwest of Balnibarbi. The book's text states that Luggnagg is located about one hundred leagues southeast of Japan, but northwest of Balnibarbi and gives its position as 29°N 140°E. The page notes refer to Frederick Bracher's "Maps in Gulliver’s Travels" (1944–45), which examines the problems raised by the maps in Gulliver's Travels, especially those accompanying Part III of the book. The map also shows the port of Maldonada in Luggnagg, and the island of Glubdubdrib to the southwest, while the text is clear those places are in Balnibarbi.

== Description ==
It has two principal ports, Clumegnig on the southeast coast, which is visited by ships from Maldonada (the port city of Balnibarbi), and Glanguenstald in the southwest, which has commerce with Japan. The capital of Luggnagg is Traldragdubb (also pronounced Trildrogdrib). A sample of the language of Luggnagg is found in the book, on the occasion when Gulliver has an audience with Luggnagg's king, and is described as being very ugly and clumsy for Gulliver to pronounce.

Notable among the inhabitants of Luggnagg are the struldbruggs, unfortunates who are immortal but suffer the infirmities of old age.

== See also ==
- Mount Penglai, an easterly location in Chinese and Japanese mythology where the Eight Immortals lived.
- Fusang, another location in the further east in Chinese mythology.

== Sources ==
- Jonathan Swift: Guliver's Travels Oxford World Classics (1986, reprint 2008) introduction by Claude Rawson, explanatory notes by Ian Higgins
