= Gulliver's Travels =

1726 novel by Jonathan Swift

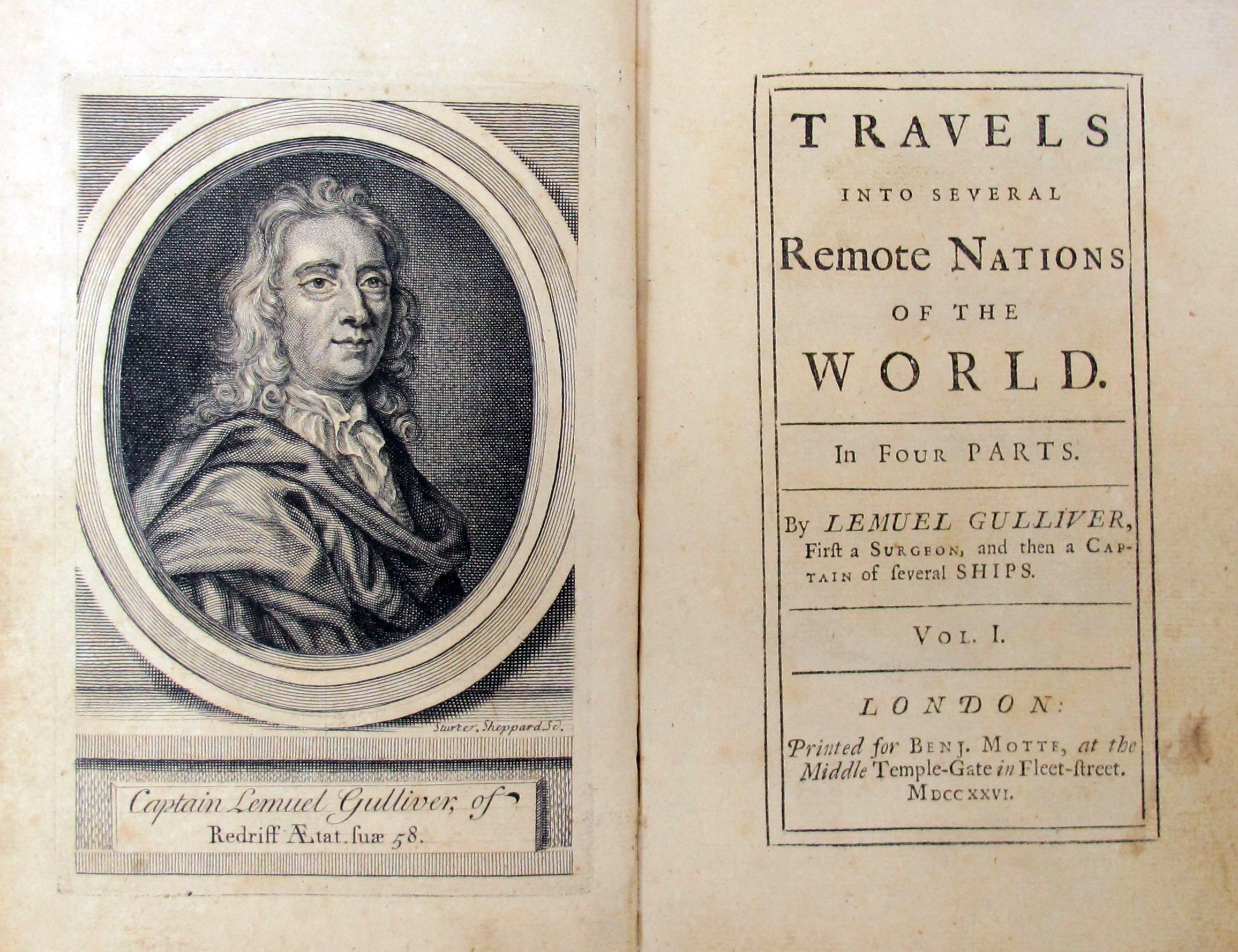
- First edition of Gulliver's Travels, printed in London (1726)
- Author: Jonathan Swift
- Original title: Travels into Several Remote Nations of the World. In Four Parts. By Lemuel Gulliver, First a Surgeon, and then a Captain of Several Ships
- Language: English
- Genre: Satire, fantasy, Science fiction, traveller's tale
- Publisher: Benjamin Motte
- Publication date: 28 October 1726 (300 years ago)
- Publication place: Kingdom of Great Britain
- Media type: Print
- Dewey Decimal: 823.5
- Text: Gulliver's Travels at Wikisource

Gulliver's Travels, originally titled Travels into Several Remote Nations of the World. In Four Parts. By Lemuel Gulliver, First a Surgeon, and then a Captain of Several Ships, is a 1726 satirical prose novel by the Anglo-Irish writer and clergyman Jonathan Swift. It is one of the most famous classics of both English and world literature, and popularised the fictional island of Lilliput. The poet John Gay remarked of the work, "It is universally read, from the cabinet council to the nursery." The novel satirises human nature and the imaginary "travellers' tales" literary subgenre, and it has been adapted for theatrical performances, films, television, and radio over the centuries.

The story is about Lemuel Gulliver, an adventurous Englishman who travels to a series of strange and distant lands, each inhabited by unusual beings that reflect different aspects of human nature and society. In Lilliput, he encounters tiny people engaged in petty political disputes; in Brobdingnag, he is a small man among giants who criticise European customs; in Laputa, he meets impractical intellectuals disconnected from reality; and in the land of the Houyhnhnms, he finds rational horses living peacefully alongside savage human-like creatures called Yahoos. Through these journeys, the novel satirises the flaws of various civilisations.

It is uncertain when Swift began writing the novel, but it is considered to have been an attempt at satirising popular literary genres. By mid 1725, the book was finished and as the work was a political satire, it is very likely that Swift had the manuscript copied by another writer so that his writing could not be used as evidence if a legal case should arise. The novel also has numerous made-up words, referred to as Liliputian language, which critics say might have been inspired by Hebrew. On its publication, the book was an immediate success, and Swift claimed that he had written Gulliver's Travels "to vex the world rather than divert it". Initial public opinions were overwhelmingly positive, with most readers lauding the clever satire, realistic depictions of travel to distant lands, and the political dangers that travelers often face as visitors. However, some critics accused Swift of excessive misanthropy. The English novelist William Thackeray, in particular, described the work as being "blasphemous", saying it was overly harsh in its depiction of human societies.

Gulliver's Travels remains popular in modern times due to its insightful social commentary and political themes. Although the novel is popularly regarded as children's literature, Swift wrote it as a political satire. The book's satire, particularly its elaborate critique of human nature, societal flaws and norms, and personal relations, continues to be studied in literary circles. Since his death, Swift has emerged as the most widely read and translated Irish author, and Gulliver's Travels has retained its position as the most printed book by an Irish writer in libraries, bookstores, and reading cafes worldwide.

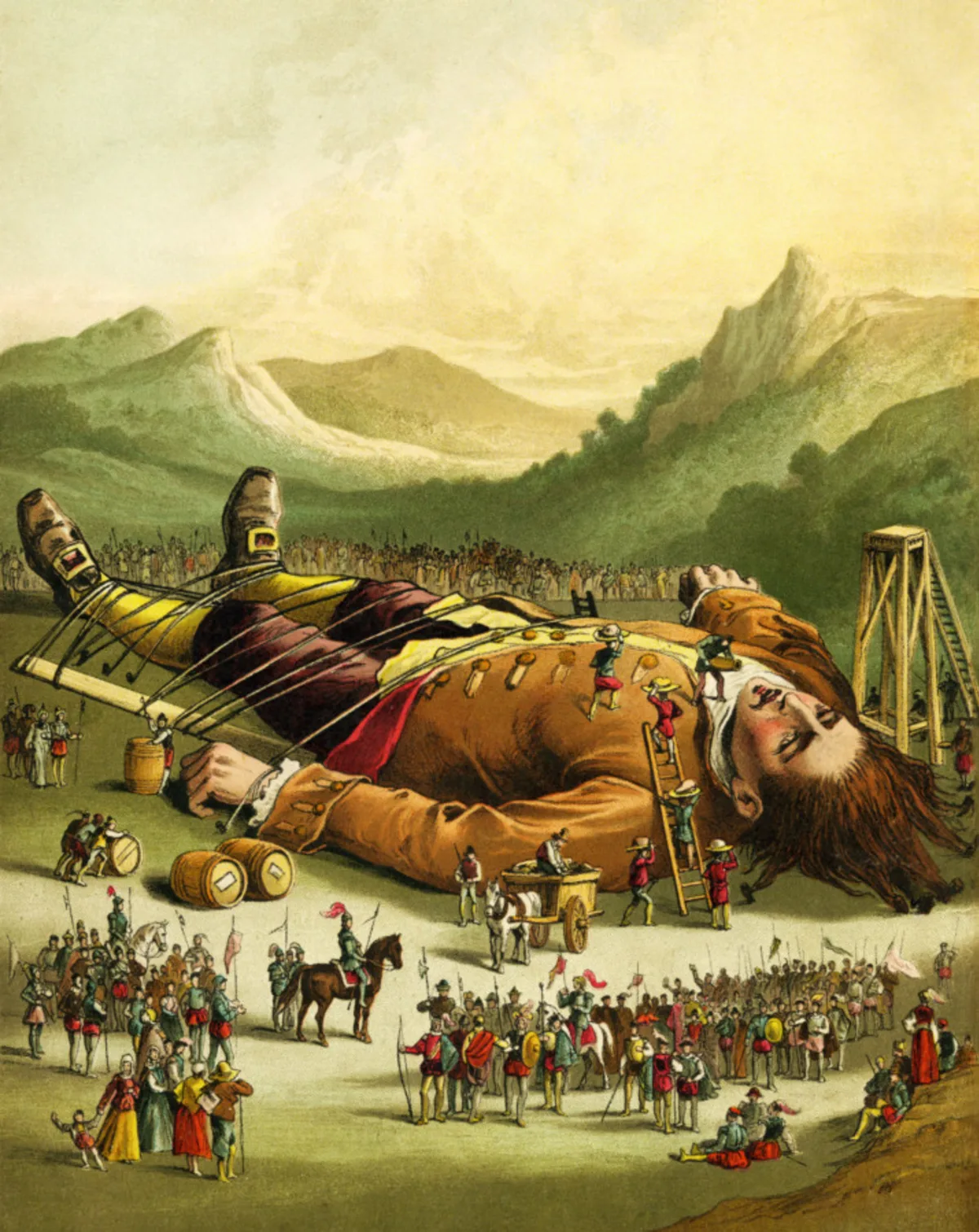
Gulliver tied up by the Lilliputians, from Gulliver's Travels: Coloured Picture Book for the Nursery, Thomas Nelson and Sons, London, Edinburgh, New York, 1883

== Plot summary ==
Locations visited by Gulliver, according to Arthur Ellicott Case. Case contends that the maps in the published text were drawn by someone who did not follow Swift's geographical descriptions; to correct this, he makes changes such as placing Lilliput to the east of Australia instead of the west.

=== Part I: A Voyage to Lilliput ===
The travel begins with a short preamble in which Lemuel Gulliver gives an outline of his life and history before his voyages.

4 May 1699 – 13 April 1702

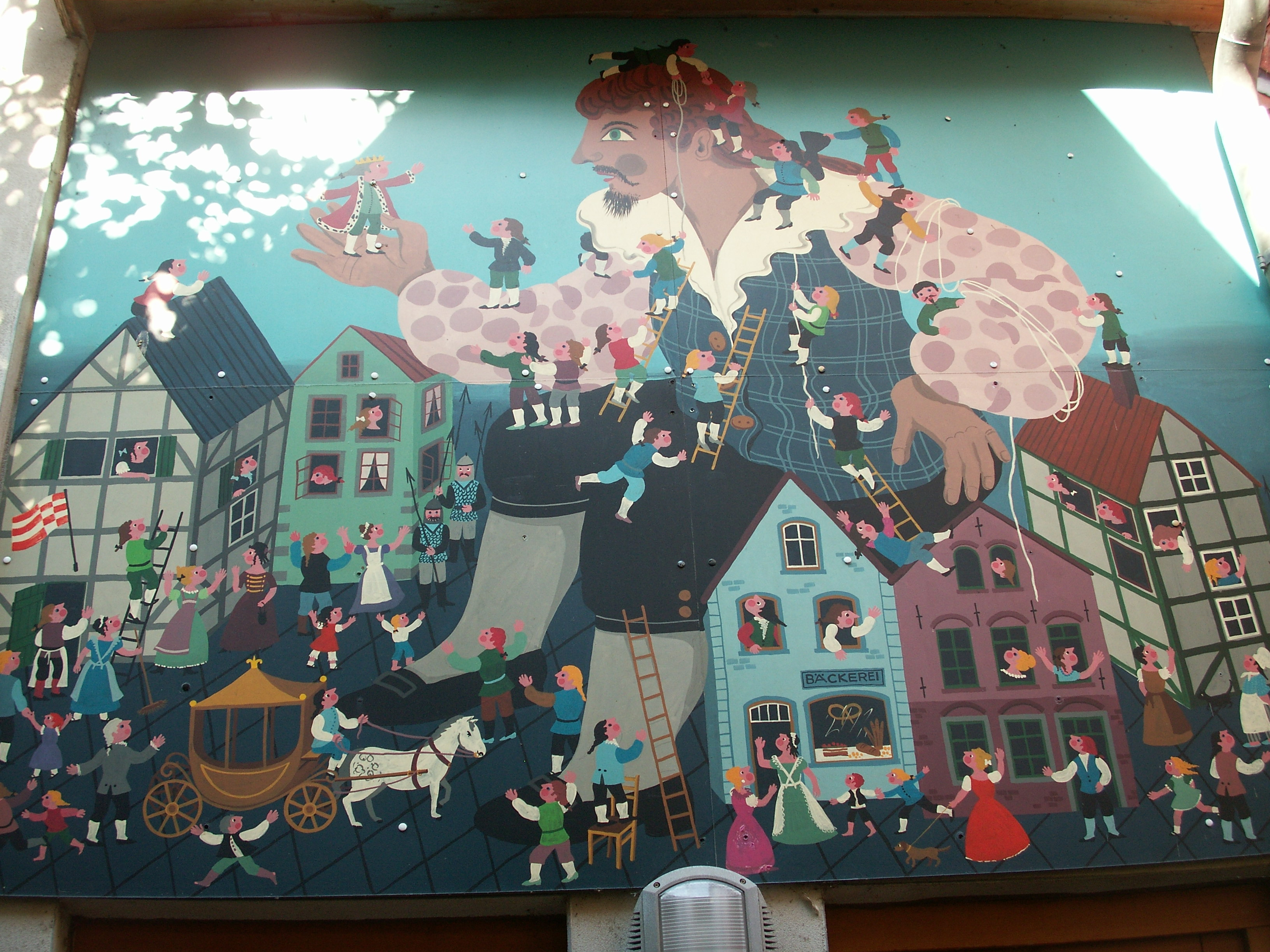
Mural depicting Gulliver surrounded by citizens of Lilliput

During his first voyage, Gulliver is washed ashore after a shipwreck and finds himself a prisoner of a race of tiny people less than 6 inches (15 cm) tall, much like the little people in mythology, who are inhabitants of the island country of Lilliput. After giving assurances of his good behaviour, he is given a residence in Lilliput and becomes a favourite of the Lilliput Royal Court. He is also given permission by the King of Lilliput to go around the city on the condition that he must not hurt their subjects.

At first, the Lilliputians are hospitable to Gulliver, but they are also wary of the threat that his size poses to them. The Lilliputians reveal themselves to be a people who put great emphasis on trivial matters. For example, which end of an egg a person cracks becomes the basis of a deep political rift within that nation. They are a people who revel in displays of authority and performances of power. Gulliver aids the Lilliputians against the rival island nation of Blefuscu by stealing its naval fleet. He refuses to reduce Blefuscu to a province of Lilliput, displeasing the King and the royal court.

Gulliver is charged with treason for, among other crimes, urinating in the capital as his way of putting out a fire. He is convicted and sentenced to be blinded. With the assistance of a kind friend, "a considerable person at court", he escapes to Blefuscu. Here, he spots and retrieves an abandoned boat and sails out to be rescued by a passing ship, which safely takes him back home with some Lilliputian animals he carries with him.

=== Part II: A Voyage to Brobdingnag ===
20 June 1702 – 3 June 1706

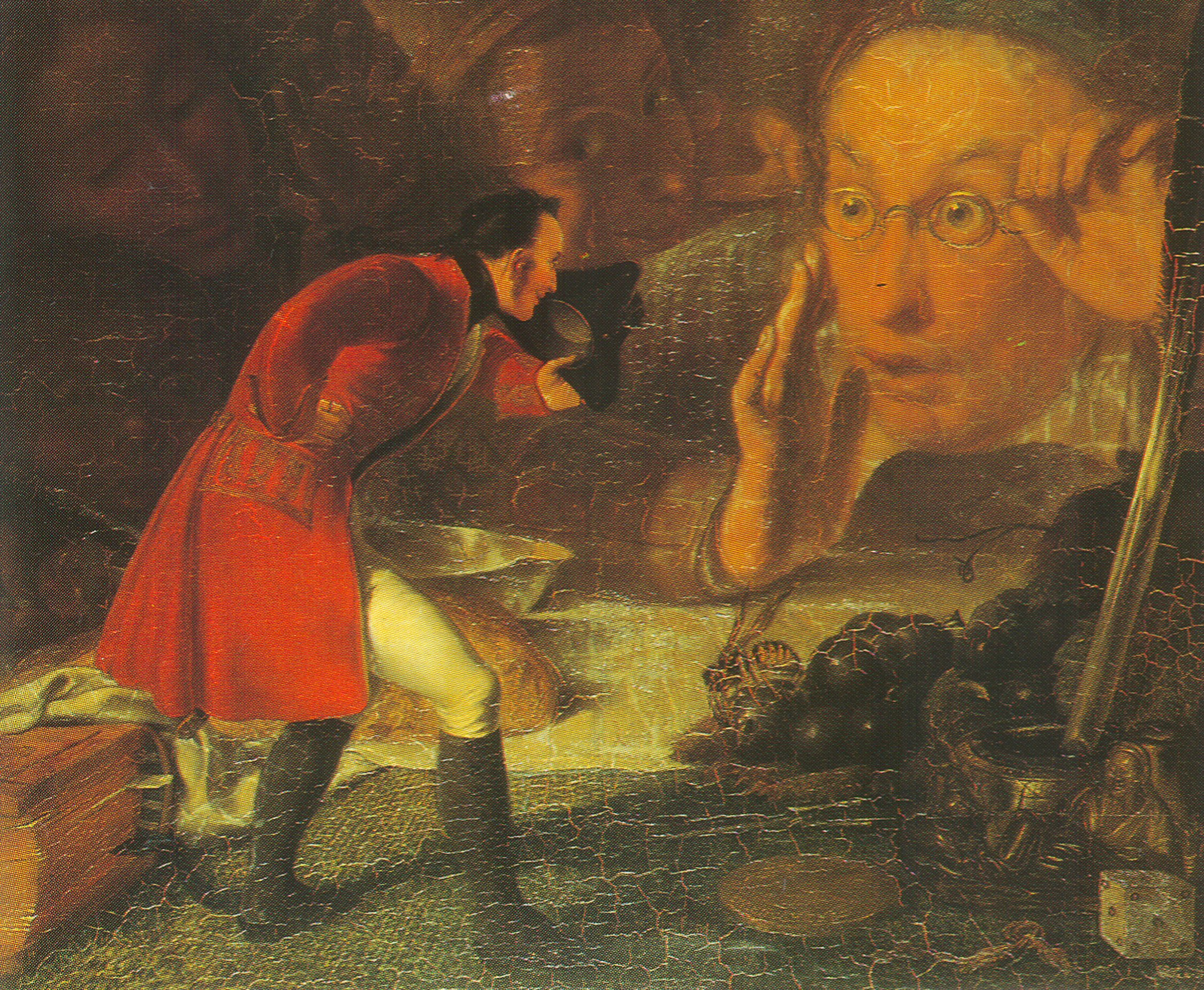
Gulliver exhibited to the Brobdingnag Farmer (painting by Richard Redgrave)

Gulliver soon sets out again. When the sailing ship Adventure is blown off course by storms and forced to sail for land in search of fresh water, Gulliver is abandoned by his companions and left on a peninsula on the western coast of the North American continent. The grass of this new land called Brobdingnag is as tall as a tree.

Gulliver is found by a farmer who is about 72 feet (22 m) tall, judging from Gulliver estimating the man's step being 10 yards (9 m). The giant farmer brings Gulliver home, and his daughter Glumdalclitch cares for Gulliver. The farmer treats him as a curiosity and exhibits him for money.

After a while, the constant display makes Gulliver sick and the farmer sells him to the queen of the realm. Glumdalclitch (who accompanied her father while exhibiting Gulliver) is taken into the queen's service to take care of the tiny man. Since Gulliver is too small to use their huge chairs, beds, knives and forks, the queen commissions a small house to be built so he can be carried around in it; this is referred to as Gulliver's "travelling box".

Between small adventures (such as fighting giant wasps unleashed by a jealous court dwarf and being carried to the roof by a monkey), Gulliver discusses the state of Europe with the King of Brobdingnag. The king is dissatisfied with Gulliver's accounts of Europe, especially upon learning of the use of guns and cannon. On a trip to the seaside, Gulliver's traveling box is seized by a giant eagle which drops Gulliver and his box into the sea. He is rescued by sailors who return him to England.

=== Part III: A Voyage to Laputa, Balnibarbi, Luggnagg, Glubbdubdrib and Japan ===
5 August 1706 – 16 April 1710

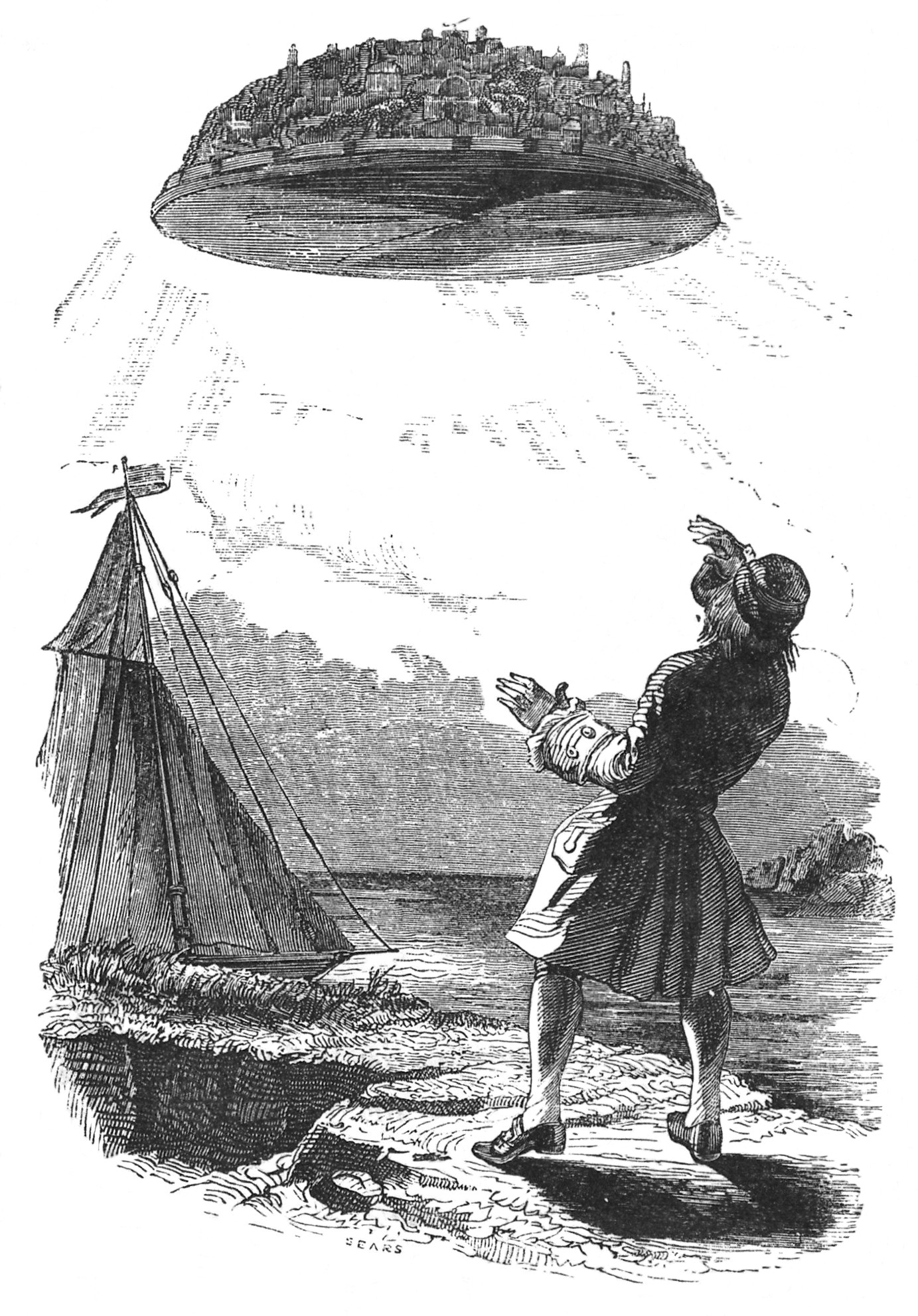
Gulliver discovers Laputa, the floating/flying island (illustration by J. J. Grandville)

Setting out again, Gulliver's ship is attacked by pirates, and he is marooned close to a desolate rocky island near India. He is rescued by the flying island of Laputa, a kingdom devoted to the arts of music, mathematics, and astronomy but unable to use them for practical ends. Rather than using armies, Laputa has a custom of throwing rocks down at rebellious cities on the ground.

Gulliver tours Balnibarbi, the kingdom ruled from Laputa, as the guest of a low-ranking courtier and sees the ruin brought about by the blind pursuit of science without practical results, in a satire on bureaucracy and on the Royal Society and its experiments. At the Grand Academy of Lagado in Balnibarbi, great resources and manpower are employed on researching preposterous schemes such as extracting sunbeams from cucumbers, softening marble for use in pillows, learning how to mix paint by smell, and uncovering political conspiracies by examining the excrement of suspicious persons. Gulliver refers in passing to his visit to Tribnia (that is, Britain), called by some Langden (that is, England), where the main occupations are plotting and informing. Gulliver is then taken to Maldonada, the main port of Balnibarbi, to await a trader who can take him on to Japan.

While waiting for a passage, Gulliver takes a short side-trip to the island of Glubbdubdrib which is southwest of Balnibarbi. On Glubbdubdrib, he visits a magician's dwelling and discusses history with the ghosts of historical figures, the most obvious restatement of the "ancients versus moderns" theme in the book. The ghosts include Julius Caesar, Brutus, Homer, Aristotle, René Descartes, and Pierre Gassendi.

On the island of Luggnagg, he encounters the struldbrugs who are people that are immortal. They do not have the gift of eternal youth, but suffer the infirmities of old age and are considered legally dead at the age of eighty.

After reaching Japan, Gulliver asks the Emperor "to excuse my performing the ceremony imposed upon my countrymen of trampling upon the crucifix", which the Emperor does. Gulliver returns home, determined to stay there for the rest of his days.

=== Part IV: A Voyage to the Land of the Houyhnhnms ===
7 September 1710 – 5 December 1715

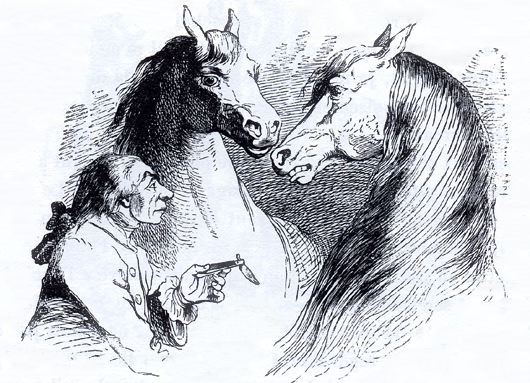
Gulliver in discussion with Houyhnhnms (1856 illustration by J.J. Grandville)

Despite his earlier intention of remaining at home, Gulliver returns to sea as the captain of a merchantman, as he is bored with his employment as a surgeon. On this voyage his crew mutinies, resolving to leave him on the first piece of land they come across and continue as pirates. Cast adrift in a landing boat he arrives at the land of the Houyhnhnms, populated by a race of deformed savage humanoid creatures (Yahoos) to which he conceives a violent antipathy. and a race of intelligent, civilized horses (the Houyhnhnms).

Some scholars have identified the relationship between the Houyhnhnms and Yahoos as a master/slave dynamic.

Gulliver becomes a member of a horse's household and comes to both admire and emulate the Houyhnhnms and their way of life, rejecting his fellow humans as merely Yahoos endowed with some semblance of reason which they only use to exacerbate and add to the vices Nature gave them. However, an Assembly of the Houyhnhnms rules that Gulliver, a Yahoo with some semblance of reason, is a danger to their civilization and commands him to swim back to the land that he came from. Gulliver's "Master", the Houyhnhnm who took him into his household, buys him time to create a canoe to make his departure easier. After another disastrous voyage, he is rescued against his will by a Portuguese ship. He is disgusted to see that Captain Pedro de Mendez, whom he considers a Yahoo, is a wise, courteous, and generous person.

He returns to his home in England, but is unable to reconcile himself to living among "Yahoos" and becomes a recluse, remaining in his house, avoiding his family and his wife, and spending several hours a day speaking with the horses in his stables.

== Composition and history ==
It is uncertain when Swift started writing Gulliver's Travels. (Much of the writing was done at Loughry Manor in Cookstown, County Tyrone.) Some sources suggest as early as 1713 when Swift, Gay, Pope, Arbuthnot and others formed the Scriblerus Club with the aim of satirising popular literary genres. According to these accounts, Swift was charged with writing the memoirs of the club's imaginary author, Martinus Scriblerus, and also with satirising the "travellers' tales" literary subgenre. It is known from Swift's correspondence that the composition proper began in 1720 with the mirror-themed Parts I and II written first, Part IV next in 1723 and Part III written in 1724; amendments were made even while Swift was writing Drapier's Letters. By August 1725 the book was complete; and as Gulliver's Travels was a transparently anti-Whig satire, it is likely that Swift had the manuscript copied so that his writing could not be used as evidence if a prosecution should arise, as had happened in the case of some of his Irish pamphlets (the Drapier's Letters). In March 1726 Swift travelled to London to have his work published; the manuscript was secretly delivered to the publisher Benjamin Motte, who used five printing houses to speed production and avoid piracy. Motte, recognising a best-seller but fearing prosecution, cut or altered the worst offending passages (such as the descriptions of the court contests in Lilliput and the rebellion of Lindalino), added some material in defence of Queen Anne to Part II, and published it. The first edition was released in two volumes on 28 October 1726, priced at 8s. 6d.

Motte published Gulliver's Travels anonymously, and as was often the way with fashionable works, several follow-ups (Memoirs of the Court of Lilliput), parodies (Two Lilliputian Odes, The first on the Famous Engine With Which Captain Gulliver extinguish'd the Palace Fire...) and "keys" (Gulliver Decipher'd and Lemuel Gulliver's Travels into Several Remote Regions of the World Compendiously Methodiz'd, the second by Edmund Curll who had similarly written a "key" to Swift's Tale of a Tub in 1705) were swiftly produced. These were mostly printed anonymously (or occasionally pseudonymously) and were quickly forgotten. Swift had nothing to do with them and disavowed them in Faulkner's edition of 1735. Swift's friend Alexander Pope wrote a set of five Verses on Gulliver's Travels, which Swift liked so much that he added them to the second edition of the book, though they are rarely included in modern editions.

=== Faulkner's 1735 edition ===
In 1735 an Irish publisher, George Faulkner, printed a set of Swift's works, Volume III of which was Gulliver's Travels. As revealed in Faulkner's "Advertisement to the Reader", Faulkner had access to an annotated copy of Motte's work by "a friend of the author" (generally believed to be Swift's friend Charles Ford) which reproduced most of the manuscript without Motte's amendments, the original manuscript having been destroyed. It is also believed that Swift at least reviewed proofs of Faulkner's edition before printing, but this cannot be proved. Generally, this is regarded as the editio princeps of Gulliver's Travels with one small exception. This edition had an added piece by Swift, A letter from Capt. Gulliver to his Cousin Sympson, which complained of Motte's alterations to the original text, saying he had so much altered it that "I do hardly know mine own work" and repudiating all of Motte's changes as well as all the keys, libels, parodies, second parts and continuations that had appeared in the intervening years. This letter now forms part of many standard texts.

=== Lindalino ===
The five-paragraph episode in Part III, telling of the rebellion of the surface city of Lindalino against the flying island of Laputa, was an allegory of the affair of Drapier's Letters of which Swift was proud. Lindalino represented Dublin and the impositions of Laputa represented the British imposition of William Wood's poor-quality copper currency. Faulkner had omitted this passage, either because of political sensitivities raised by an Irish publisher printing an anti-British satire, or possibly because the text he worked from did not include the passage. In 1899 the passage was included in a new edition of the Collected Works. Modern editions derive from the Faulkner edition with the inclusion of this 1899 addendum.

== Themes ==
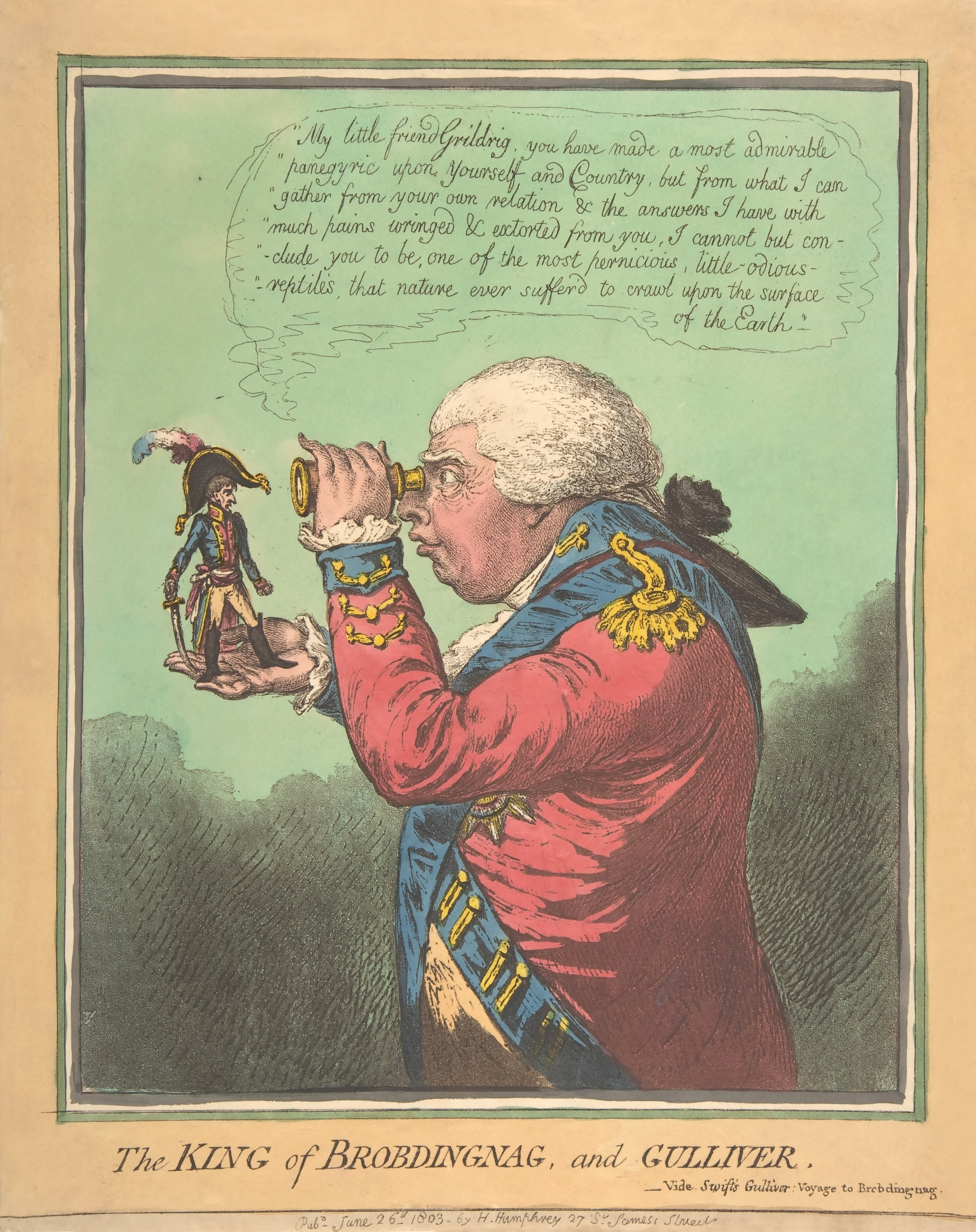
The King of Brobdingnag and Gulliver by James Gillray (1803), (satirising Napoleon Bonaparte and George III). Metropolitan Museum of Art, New York

Gulliver's Travels has been described as a Menippean satire, a children's story, proto-science fiction and a forerunner of the modern novel. Published seven years after Daniel Defoe's successful Robinson Crusoe, Gulliver's Travels may be read as a systematic rebuttal of Defoe's optimistic account of human capability. In The Unthinkable Swift: The Spontaneous Philosophy of a Church of England Man, Warren Montag argues that Swift was concerned to refute the notion that the individual precedes society as Defoe's work seems to suggest. Swift regarded such thought as a dangerous endorsement of Thomas Hobbes' radical political philosophy and for this reason Gulliver repeatedly encounters established societies rather than desolate islands. The captain who invites Gulliver to serve as a surgeon aboard his ship on the disastrous third voyage is named Robinson.

Allan Bloom asserts that Swift's lampooning of the experiments of Laputa is the first questioning by a modern liberal democrat of the effects and cost on a society which embraces and celebrates policies pursuing scientific progress. Swift wrote,

The first man I saw was of a meagre aspect, with sooty hands and face, his hair and beard long, ragged, and singed in several places. His clothes, shirt, and skin, were all of the same colour. He has been eight years upon a project for extracting sunbeams out of cucumbers, which were to be put in phials hermetically sealed, and let out to warm the air in raw inclement summers. He told me, he did not doubt, that, in eight years more, he should be able to supply the governor's gardens with sunshine, at a reasonable rate: but he complained that his stock was low, and entreated me "to give him something as an encouragement to ingenuity, especially since this had been a very dear season for cucumbers". I made him a small present, for my lord had furnished me with money on purpose, because he knew their practice of begging from all who go to see them.

A possible reason for the book's classic status is that it can be seen as many things to many people. Broadly, the book has three themes:

- A satirical view of the state of European government, and of petty differences between religions
- An inquiry into whether people are inherently corrupt or whether they become corrupted
- A restatement of the older "ancients versus moderns" controversy previously addressed by Swift in The Battle of the Books

In storytelling and construction the parts follow a pattern:

- The causes of Gulliver's misadventures become more malignant as time goes on—he is first shipwrecked, then abandoned, then attacked by strangers, then attacked by his crew.
- Gulliver's attitude hardens as the book progresses—he is genuinely surprised by the viciousness and politicking of the Lilliputians but finds the behaviour of the Yahoos in the fourth part reflective of the behaviour of people.
- Each part is the reverse of the preceding part—Gulliver is big/small/wise/ignorant, the countries are complex/simple/scientific/natural, and Gulliver perceives the forms of government as worse/better/worse/better than Britain's (although Swift's opinions on this matter are unclear).
- Gulliver's viewpoint between parts is mirrored by that of his antagonists in the contrasting part—Gulliver sees the tiny Lilliputians as being vicious and unscrupulous, and then the king of Brobdingnag sees Europe in exactly the same light; Gulliver sees the Laputians as unreasonable, and his Houyhnhnm master sees humanity as equally so.
- No form of government is ideal—the simplistic Brobdingnagians enjoy public executions and have streets infested with beggars, the honest and upright Houyhnhnms who have no word for lying are happy to suppress the true nature of Gulliver as a Yahoo and are equally unconcerned about his reaction to being expelled.
- Specific individuals may be good even where the race is bad—Gulliver finds a friend in each of his travels and, despite Gulliver's rejection and horror toward all Yahoos, is treated very well by the Portuguese captain, Don Pedro, who returns him to England at the book's end.

=== Misogyny ===
Although Swift is often accused of misogyny in this work, many scholars believe Gulliver's blatant misogyny to be intentional, and that Swift uses satire to mock misogyny throughout the book. One of the most cited examples of this comes from Gulliver's description of a Brobdingnagian woman:

I must confess no Object ever disgusted me so much as the Sight of her monstrous Breast, which I cannot tell what to compare with, so as to give the curious Reader an Idea of its Bulk, Shape, and Colour.... This made me reflect upon the fair Skins of our English Ladies, who appear so beautiful to us, only because they are of our own Size, and their Defects not to be seen but through a magnifying glass....

This critique of aspects of the female body is something that Swift often brings up in other works of his, particularly in poems such as The Lady's Dressing Room and A Beautiful Young Nymph Going To Bed.

A criticism of Swift's use of misogyny by Felicity A. Nussbaum proposes the idea that "Gulliver himself is a gendered object of satire, and his antifeminist sentiments may be among those mocked". Gulliver's own masculinity is often mocked, seen in how he is made to be a coward among the Brobdingnag people, repressed by the people of Lilliput, and viewed as an inferior Yahoo among the Houyhnhnms. Nussbaum goes on to say that in the adventures, particularly in the first story, the satire is not singularly focused on satirizing women, but to satirize Gulliver as a politically naive and inept giant whose masculine authority comically seems to be in jeopardy.

Another criticism of Swift's use of misogyny delves into Gulliver's repeated use of the word 'nauseous', and the way that Gulliver is fighting his emasculation by commenting on how he thinks the women of Brobdingnag are disgusting,

Swift has Gulliver frequently invoke the sensory (as opposed to reflective) word "nauseous" to describe this and other magnified images in Brobdingnag not only to reveal the neurotic depths of Gulliver's misogyny, but also to show how male nausea can be used as a pathetic countermeasure against the perceived threat of female consumption. Swift has Gulliver associate these magnified acts of female consumption with the act of "throwing-up"—the opposite of and antidote to the act of gastronomic consumption.

This commentary of Deborah Needleman Armintor relies on the giant women doing with Gulliver as they please, in much the same way as one might play with a toy, and get it to do everything one can think of. Armintor's comparison focuses on the pocket microscopes that were popular in Swift's time. She talks about how this instrument of science evolved into something toy-like and accessible, so it shifted into something that women favored, and thus men lost interest. This is similar to the progression of Gulliver's time in Brobdingnag, from man of science to women's plaything.

=== Comic misanthropy ===
Misanthropy is a theme that scholars have identified in Gulliver's Travels. Arthur Case, R.S. Crane, and Edward Stone discuss Gulliver's development of misanthropy and come to the consensus that this theme ought to be viewed as comical rather than cynical.

In terms of Gulliver's development of misanthropy, these three scholars point to the fourth voyage. According to Case, Gulliver is at first averse to identifying with the Yahoos, but, after he deems the Houyhnhnms superior, he comes to believe that humans (including his fellow Europeans) are Yahoos due to their shortcomings. Perceiving the Houyhnhnms as perfect, Gulliver thus begins to perceive himself and the rest of humanity as imperfect. According to Crane, when Gulliver develops his misanthropic mindset, he becomes ashamed of humans and views them more in line with animals. This new perception of Gulliver's, Stone claims, comes about because the Houyhnhnms' judgement pushes Gulliver to identify with the Yahoos. Along similar lines, Crane holds that Gulliver's misanthropy is developed in part when he talks to the Houyhnhnms about mankind because the discussions lead him to reflect on his previously held notion of humanity. Specifically, Gulliver's master, who is a Houyhnhnm, provides questions and commentary that contribute to Gulliver's reflectiveness and subsequent development of misanthropy. However, Case points out that Gulliver's dwindling opinion of humans may be blown out of proportion due to the fact that he is no longer able to see the good qualities that humans are capable of possessing. Gulliver's new view of humanity, then, creates his repulsive attitude towards his fellow humans after leaving Houyhnhnmland. But in Stone's view, Gulliver's actions and attitude upon his return can be interpreted as misanthropy that is exaggerated for comic effect rather than for a cynical effect. Stone further suggests that Gulliver goes mentally mad and believes that this is what leads Gulliver to exaggerate the shortcomings of humankind.

Another aspect that Crane attributes to Gulliver's development of misanthropy is that when in Houyhnhnmland, it is the animal-like beings (the Houyhnhnms) who exhibit reason and the human-like beings (the Yahoos) who seem devoid of reason; Crane argues that it is this switch from Gulliver's perceived norm that leads the way for him to question his view of humanity. As a result, Gulliver begins to identify humans as a type of Yahoo. To this point, Crane brings up the fact that a traditional definition of man—Homo est animal rationale (Humans are rational animals)—was prominent in academia around Swift's time. Furthermore, Crane argues that Swift had to study this type of logic (see Porphyrian Tree) in college, so it is highly likely that he intentionally inverted this logic by placing the typically given example of irrational beings—horses—in the place of humans and vice versa.

Stone points out that Gulliver's Travels takes a cue from the genre of the travel book, which was popular during Swift's time period. From reading travel books, Swift's contemporaries were accustomed to beast-like figures of foreign places; thus, Stone holds that the creation of the Yahoos was not out of the ordinary for the time period. From this playing off of familiar genre expectations, Stone deduces that the parallels that Swift draws between the Yahoos and humans is meant to be humorous rather than cynical. Even though Gulliver sees Yahoos and humans as if they are one and the same, Stone argues that Swift did not intend for readers to take on Gulliver's view; Stone states that the Yahoos' behaviors and characteristics that set them apart from humans further supports the notion that Gulliver's identification with Yahoos is not meant to be taken to heart. Thus, Stone sees Gulliver's perceived superiority of the Houyhnhnms and subsequent misanthropy as features that Swift used to employ the satirical and humorous elements characteristic of the Beast Fables of travel books that were popular with his contemporaries; as Swift did, these Beast Fables placed animals above humans in terms of morals and reason, but they were not meant to be taken literally.

=== Character analysis ===
Pedro de Mendez is the name of the Portuguese captain who rescues Gulliver in Book IV. When Gulliver is forced to leave the Island of the Houyhnhnms, his plan is "to discover some small Island uninhabited" where he can live in solitude. Instead, he is picked up by Don Pedro's crew. Despite Gulliver's appearance—he is dressed in skins and speaks like a horse—Don Pedro treats him compassionately and returns him to Lisbon.

Though Don Pedro appears only briefly, he has become an important figure in the debate between so-called soft school and hard school readers of Gulliver's Travels. Some critics contend that Gulliver is a target of Swift's satire and that Don Pedro represents an ideal of human kindness and generosity. Gulliver believes humans are similar to Yahoos in the sense that they make "no other use of reason, than to improve and multiply ... vices". Captain Pedro provides a contrast to Gulliver's reasoning, proving humans are able to reason, be kind, and most of all: civilized. Gulliver sees the bleak fallenness at the center of human nature, and Don Pedro is merely a minor character who, in Gulliver's words, is "an Animal which had some little Portion of Reason".

=== Political allusions ===
Part I is probably responsible for the greatest number of political allusions. One of the most commonly noted parallels is that the wars between Lilliput and Blefuscu resemble those between England and France. The enmity between the low heels and the high heels is often interpreted as a parody of the Whigs and Tories, and the character referred to as Flimnap is often interpreted as an allusion to Sir Robert Walpole, a British statesman and Whig politician with whom Swift had a personally turbulent relationship.

In Part III, the grand Academy of Lagado in Balnibarbi resembles and satirizes the Royal Society, which Swift was openly critical of. Furthermore, "A. E. Case, acting on a tipoff offered by the word 'projectors,' found [the Academy] to be the hiding place of many of those speculators implicated in the South Sea Bubble." According to Treadwell, however, these implications extend beyond the speculators of the South Sea Bubble to include the many projectors of the late seventeenth and early eighteenth century England, including Swift himself. Not only is Swift satirizing the role of the projector in contemporary English politics, which he dabbled in during his younger years, but the role of the satirist, whose goals align with that of a projector: "The less obvious corollary of that word [projector] is that it must include the poor deluded satirist himself, since satire is, in its very essence, the wildest of all projects—a scheme to reform the world."

Ann Kelly describes Part IV of The Travels and the Yahoo-Houyhnhnm relationship as an allusion to that of the Irish and the British: "The term that Swift uses to describe the oppression in both Ireland and Houyhnhnmland is 'slavery'; this is not an accidental word choice, for Swift was well aware of the complicated moral and philosophical questions raised by the emotional designation 'slavery.' The misery of the Irish in the early eighteenth century shocked Swift and all others who witnessed it; the hopeless passivity of the people in this desolate land made it seem as if both the minds and bodies of the Irish were enslaved." Kelly goes on to write: "Throughout the Irish tracts and poems, Swift continually vacillates as to whether the Irish are servile because of some defect within their character or whether their sordid condition is the result of a calculated policy from without to reduce them to brutishness. Although no one has done so, similar questions could be asked about the Yahoos, who are slaves to the Houyhnhnms." However, Kelly does not suggest a wholesale equivalence between Irish and Yahoos, which would be reductive and omit the various other layers of satire at work in this section.

== Language ==
Part I includes examples of the Lilliputian language, including a paragraph for which Gulliver provides a translation. In his annotated edition of the book published in 1978, Isaac Asimov claims that "making sense out of the words and phrases introduced by Swift ... is a waste of time", and these words were invented nonsense. However, Irving Rothman points out that the language may have been derived from Hebrew, which Swift had studied at Trinity College Dublin.

== Reception ==
The book was very popular upon release and was commonly discussed within social circles. Public reception widely varied, with the book receiving an initially enthusiastic reaction with readers praising its satire, and some reporting that the satire's cleverness sounded like a realistic account of a man's travels. James Beattie commended Swift's work for its "truth" regarding the narration and claims that "the statesman, the philosopher, and the critick, will admire his keenness of satire, energy of description, and vivacity of language", noting that even children can enjoy the novel. As popularity increased, critics came to appreciate the deeper aspects of Gulliver's Travels. It became known for its insightful take on morality, expanding its reputation beyond just humorous satire. It also became the most printed book by an Irish writer in libraries and bookstores worldwide.

Despite its initial positive reception, the book faced backlash. Viscount Bolingbroke, a friend of Swift and one of the first critics of the book, criticised the author for his overt use of misanthropy. Other negative responses to the book also looked towards its portrayal of humanity, which was considered inaccurate. Swift's peers rejected the book on claims that its themes of misanthropy were harmful and offensive. They criticized its satire for exceeding what was deemed acceptable and appropriate, including the Houyhnhnms and Yahoos's similarities to humans. There was also controversy surrounding the political allegories. Readers enjoyed the political references, finding them humorous. However, members of the Whig party were offended, believing that Swift mocked their politics.

British novelist and journalist William Makepeace Thackeray described Swift's work as "blasphemous", saying its critical view of mankind was ludicrous and overly harsh. He concluded that he could not understand the origins of Swift's critiques on humanity.

== Cultural influences ==
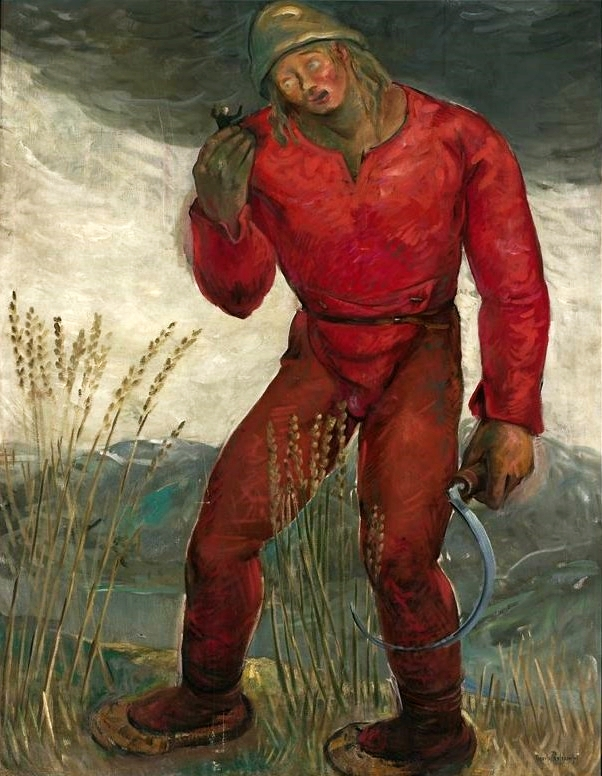
Gulliver and a giant, a painting by Tadeusz Pruszkowski (National Museum in Warsaw)

The term Lilliputian has entered many languages as an adjective meaning "small and delicate". There is a brand of small cigar called Lilliput, and a series of collectable model houses known as "Lilliput Lane". The smallest light bulb fitting (5 mm diameter) in the Edison screw series is called the "Lilliput Edison screw". In Dutch and Czech, the words Lilliputter and lilipután, respectively, are used for adults shorter than 1.30 meters, although in Dutch this term is controversial. Conversely, Brobdingnagian appears in the Oxford English Dictionary as a synonym for very large or gigantic.

In like vein, the term yahoo is often encountered as a synonym for ruffian or thug. In the Oxford English Dictionary it is defined as "a rude, noisy, or violent person" and its origins attributed to Swift's Gulliver's Travels.

In the discipline of computer architecture, the terms big-endian and little-endian are used to describe two possible ways of laying out bytes of data in computer memory. The terms derive from one of the satirical conflicts in the book, in which two religious sects of Lilliputians are divided between those who crack open their soft-boiled eggs from the little end, the "Little-endians", and those who use the big end, the "Big-endians". The nomenclature was chosen as an irony, since the choice of which byte-order method to use is technically trivial (both are equally good), but actually still important: systems which do it one way are thus incompatible with those that do it the other way, and so it shouldn't be left to each individual designer's choice, resulting in a "holy war" over a triviality.

=== In other works ===
Many sequels followed the initial publishing of the Travels. The earliest of these was the anonymously authored Memoirs of the Court of Lilliput, published 1727, which expands the account of Gulliver's stays in Lilliput and Blefuscu by adding several gossipy anecdotes about scandalous episodes at the Lilliputian court. Abbé Pierre Desfontaines, the first French translator of Swift's story, wrote a sequel, Le Nouveau Gulliver ou Voyages de Jean Gulliver, fils du capitaine Lemuel Gulliver (The New Gulliver, or the travels of John Gulliver, son of Captain Lemuel Gulliver), published in 1730. Gulliver's son has various fantastic, satirical adventures.

Traces of Swift's work can be found in the work of some modern science fiction writers. Isaac Asimov's Shah Guido G describes a flying island which dominates the lands underneath, and a large portion of Robert Heinlein's Starman Jones takes place on a planet where intelligent "horses" dominate wild Yahoo-like humanoids.

The Hungarian writer Frigyes Karinthy wrote two satirical novels with Gulliver as the protagonist. The first, Voyage to Faremido (1916), is about artificial intelligence, and the second, Capillaria (1921), describes an underwater world inhabited by women and the result of the first sexual encounter between men and women.

In the short story El informe de Brodie (Brodie's Report) by Jorge Luis Borges, published in 1970 and inspired, according to its author, by the last journey of Swift's character, the protagonist is a Scottish shepherd who narrates his experience in a place inhabited by primitive men whom he calls Yahoos.

In 2014, Argentine writer Edgar Brau published a novel titled El oficio de Gulliver (Gulliver's Craft), which describes a fifth voyage (in 1722) of Jonathan Swift's character, in which he discovers an island located off the coast of Patagonia. Every so many years, the island shrinks until it reaches the size of a tortoise, without affecting daily life; after a while, it expands again. There, Gulliver lives a series of adventures accompanied by Tito, an anteater he has rescued and taught to speak. The novel is a satire on present-day issues.

In television

The Gravity Falls episode "The Golf War" (season 2 episode 3) features a fictitious race of small people with golf balls for heads named "Lilliputtians". These people also display intense political grievances over petty things.

=== In music ===
Georg Philipp Telemann wrote a Gulliver Suite for 2 violins without bass between 1728 and 1729. It includes a "Lilliputian" chaconne, a "Brobigdinian" gigue as well as a Loure of the "well-mannered houyhnhnms" combined with a Fury of the "naughty yahoos".

== Adaptations ==
Gulliver's Travels (1939)

=== Film ===
- Gulliver's Travels Among the Lilliputians and the Giants, a 1902 French silent film directed by Georges Méliès
- Gulliver en el país de los Gigantes, 1903 silent film directed by Segundo de Chomón
- Gulliver's Travels, a 1924 Austrian silent adventure film
- Gulliver Mickey, a 1934 film in the Mickey Mouse cartoon series
- The New Gulliver, a 1935 Soviet film
- Gulliver's Travels, a 1939 American animated film
- The 3 Worlds of Gulliver, a 1960 American film loosely based on the novel
- Gulliver's Travels Beyond the Moon, a 1965 Japanese animated film featuring Gulliver as a character
- Case for a Rookie Hangman, a 1970 Czechoslovak film loosely based on Part III of the novel
- Gulliver's Travels, a 1977 British-Belgian film starring Richard Harris
- Gulliver's Travels, a 1983 Spanish animated film by Cruz Delgado
- Gulliver's Travels, a 1996 animated film by Golden Films
- Crayola Kids Adventures: Tales of Gulliver's Travels, a 1997 direct-to-video film starring Adam Wylie
- Jajantaram Mamantaram, a 2003 Indian film starring Jaaved Jaaferi
- Gulliver's Travel, a 2005 Indian animated film
- Gulliver's Travels, a 2010 American film starring Jack Black
- Gulliver Returns, a 2021 Ukrainian animated film.

=== Television ===
- Gulliver in the Country of Dwarfs, a 1974 Hungarian television film starring László Sinkó as Gulliver.
- Gulliver's Travels, a 1979 television special produced by Hanna-Barbera. The same studio produced The Adventures of Gulliver in 1968. Gary Gulliver and his dog Tag are pursued by a ship's captain; he is aided by Lilliputians Bunko, Eager, Glum, Flirtatia, and King Pomp.
- Gulliver in the Country of Giants, a 1980 Hungarian television film starring András Kozák as Gulliver.
- Gulliver in Lilliput, a 1982 television serial produced by the BBC and aired in 4 parts; concentrating on the "Lilliput" section, the serial featured Andrew Burt as Gulliver.
- Saban's Gulliver's Travels, a 1992 French animated TV series
- Gulliver's Travels, a 1996 American TV miniseries starring Ted Danson

=== Radio ===
- Gulliver's Travels, a 1948 radio adaptation in the Favorite Story series
- Gulliver's Travels, a 1999 radio adaptation in the Radio Tales series
- Brian Gulliver's Travels, a satirical radio series starring Neil Pearson
- Gulliver's Travels, a 2012 BBC Radio 4 production starring Arthur Darvill, adapted in three parts by Matthew Broughton
- Gulliver's Travels, a 2026 BBC Radio 4 production starring Graham Dickson, dramatised in two parts by Ian Billings

== Bibliography ==
=== Editions ===
The standard edition of Jonathan Swift's prose works as of 2005 is the Prose Writings in 16 volumes, edited by Herbert Davis et al.

- Swift, Jonathan Gulliver's Travels (Harmondsworth: Penguin, 2008) ISBN 978-0141439495. Edited with an introduction and notes by Robert DeMaria Jr. The copytext is based on the 1726 edition with emendations and additions from later texts and manuscripts.
- Swift, Jonathan Gulliver's Travels (Oxford: Oxford University Press, 2005) ISBN 978-0192805348. Edited with an introduction by Claude Rawson and notes by Ian Higgins. Essentially based on the same text as the Essential Writings listed below with expanded notes and an introduction, although it lacks the selection of criticism.
- Swift, Jonathan The Essential Writings of Jonathan Swift (New York: W.W. Norton, 2009) ISBN 978-0393930658. Edited with an introduction by Claude Rawson and notes by Ian Higgins. This title contains the major works of Swift in full, including Gulliver's Travels, A Modest Proposal, A Tale of a Tub, Directions to Servants and many other poetic and prose works. Also included is a selection of contextual material, and criticism from Orwell to Rawson. The text of GT is taken from Faulkner's 1735 edition.
- Swift, Jonathan Gulliver's Travels (New York: W.W. Norton, 2001) ISBN 0393957241. Edited by Albert J. Rivero. Based on the 1726 text, with some adopted emendations from later corrections and editions. Also includes a selection of contextual material, letters, and criticism.

== See also ==
- Aeneid
- List of literary cycles
- Odyssey
- Sinbad the Sailor
- Sunpadh
- The Voyage of Bran
- Castle in the Sky
- Robinson Crusoe
- Gargantua
- Baron Munchausen
- Tall tale
