= Laputa =

Fictional flying island

- Gulliver's Travels location
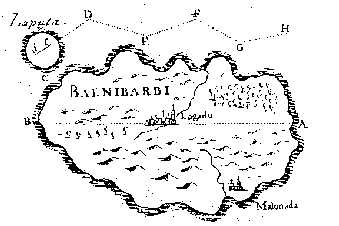
- Map of Laputa and Balnibarbi (original map, Pt III, Gulliver's Travels)
- Created by: Jonathan Swift
- Genre: Satire

In-universe information
- Type: Flying island
- Character: King

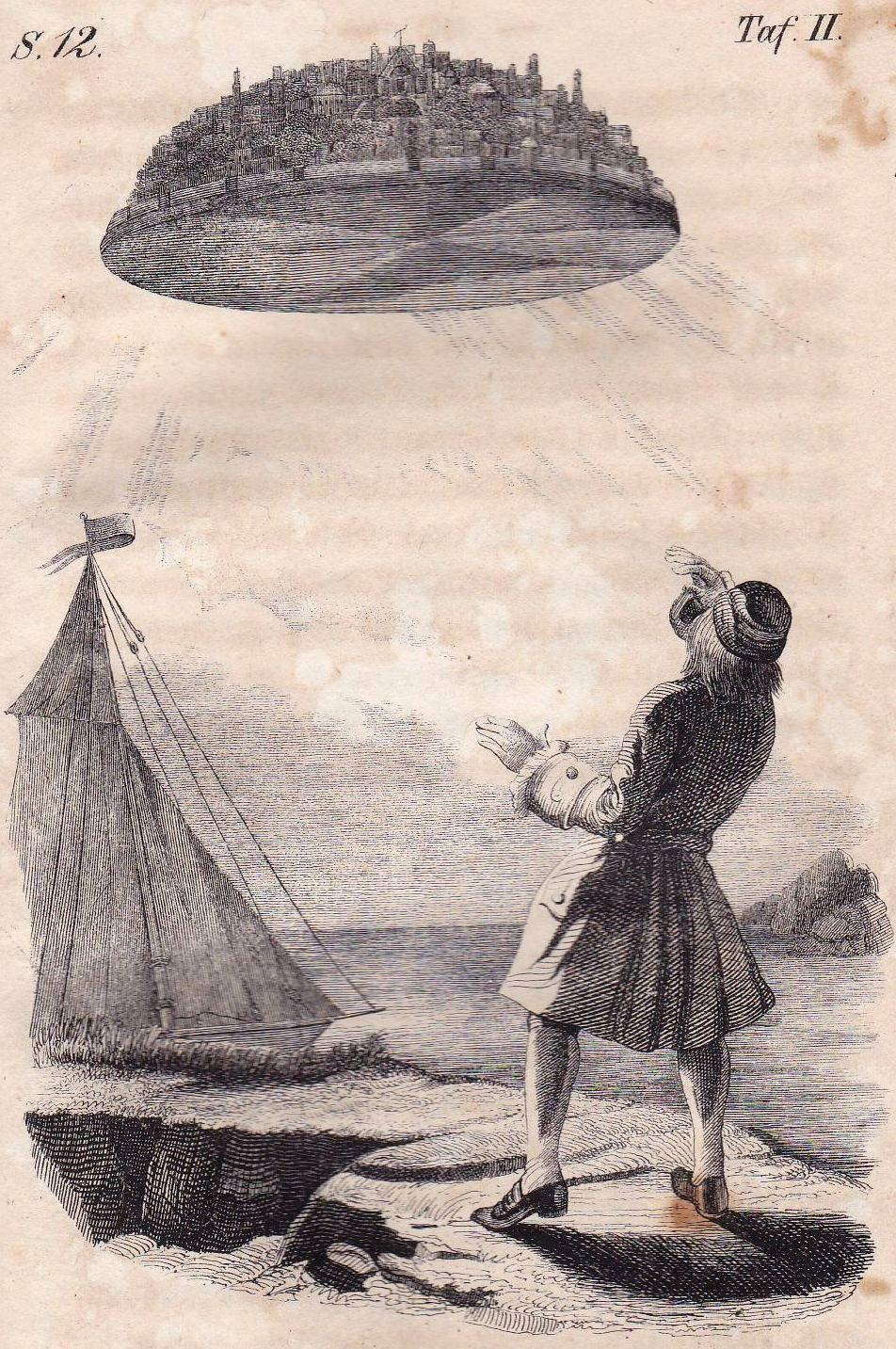
Gulliver discovers Laputa, the flying island (illustration by J. J. Grandville)

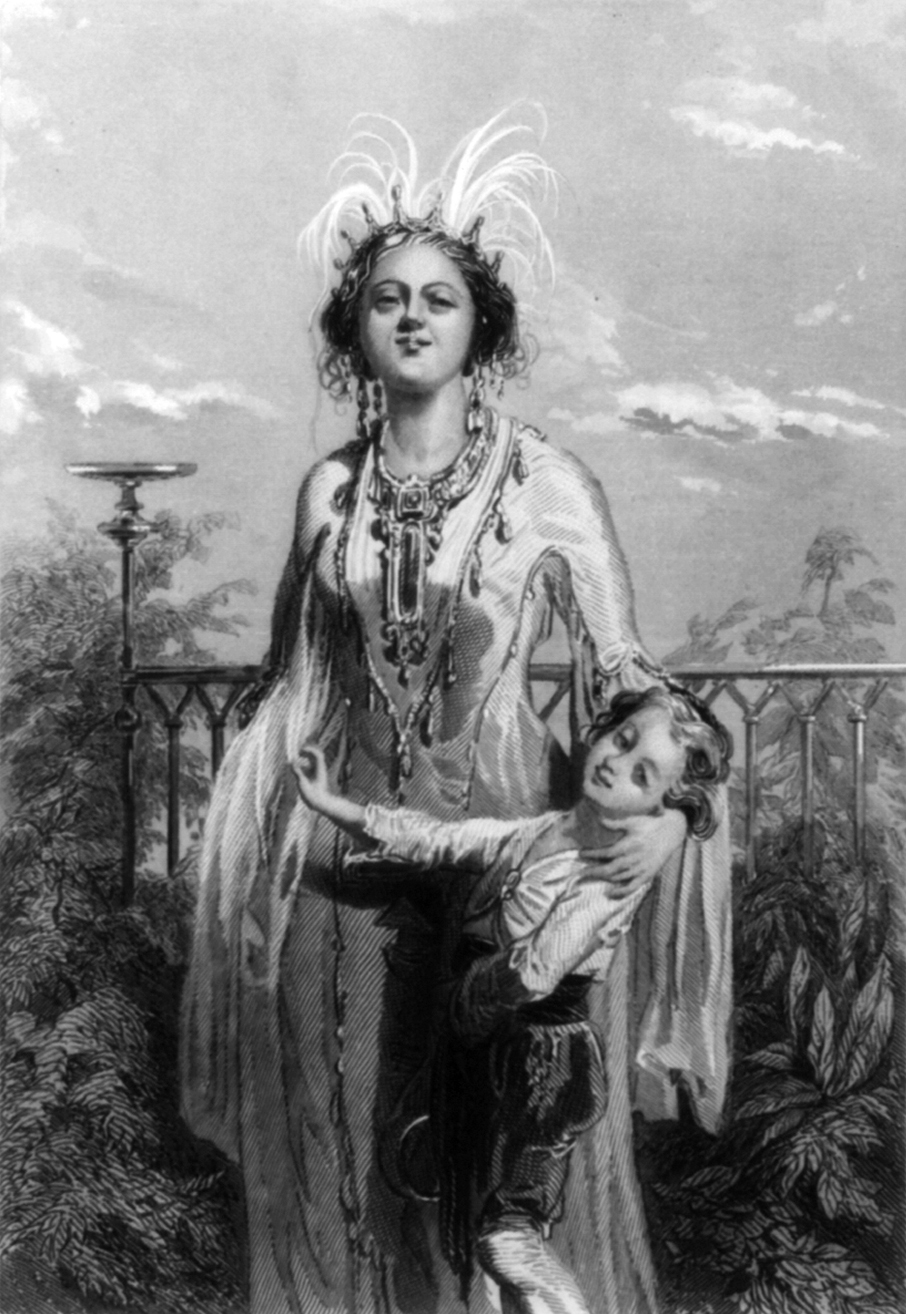
The Queen of Laputa, from a French edition of Gulliver's Travels (1850s)

Laputa /ləˈpuːtə/ is a flying island described in the 1726 book Gulliver's Travels by Jonathan Swift. It is about 4½ miles (7¼ km) in diameter, with an adamantine base, which its inhabitants can manoeuvre in any direction using magnetic levitation. The island is the home of the king of Balnibarbi and his court, and is used by the king to enforce his rule over the lands below.

== Location ==
Laputa was located above the realm of Balnibarbi, which was ruled by its king from the flying island. Gulliver states the island flew by the "magnetic virtue" of certain minerals in the grounds of Balnibarbi which did not extend to more than 4 miles (6.5 kilometres) above, and six leagues (29 kilometres) beyond the extent of the kingdom, showing the limit of its range. The position of the island, and the realm below, is some five days' journey south-south-east of Gulliver's last known position, 46° N, 183° E (i.e. east of Japan, south of the Aleutian Islands) down a chain of small rocky islands.

== In foreign languages ==
In Spanish translations of Gulliver's Travels, "Laputa" was renamed as "Lupata", "Laput", "Lapuda", and so on, to avoid similarities with the phrase "la puta" ("the whore/bitch").

== Legacy ==
- On Mars's largest moon, Phobos, there is a regio, Laputa Regio, which is named after Swift's Laputa because of his 'prediction' of the two then undiscovered Martian moons, which his Laputan astronomers had discovered.
- In the 1964 comedy film Dr. Strangelove, the primary target for the B-52 bomber crew is given as "the ICBM complex at Laputa".
- The 1986 Japanese animated fantasy film Castle in the Sky, directed by Hayao Miyazaki, derives its name and basic premise from Swift's novel.
- From 1999 to 2006 in Japan, Mazda sold the Mazda Laputa, a rebadged version of the Suzuki Kei.
