= Lemuel Gulliver =

Protagonist of Gulliver's Travels

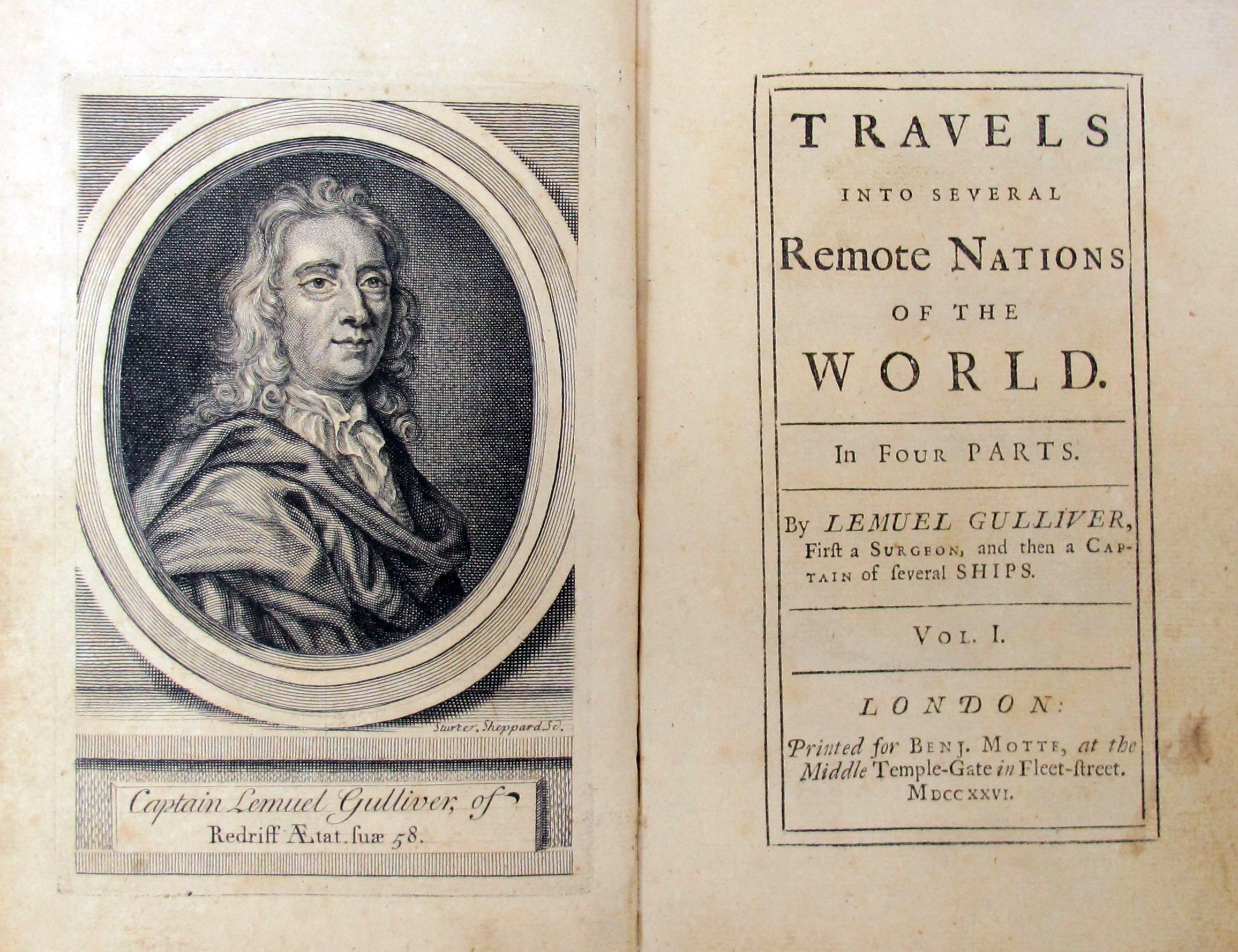
The first edition of Gulliver's Travels claimed that Lemuel Gulliver was its author, and contained a fictitious portrait of Lemuel Gulliver.

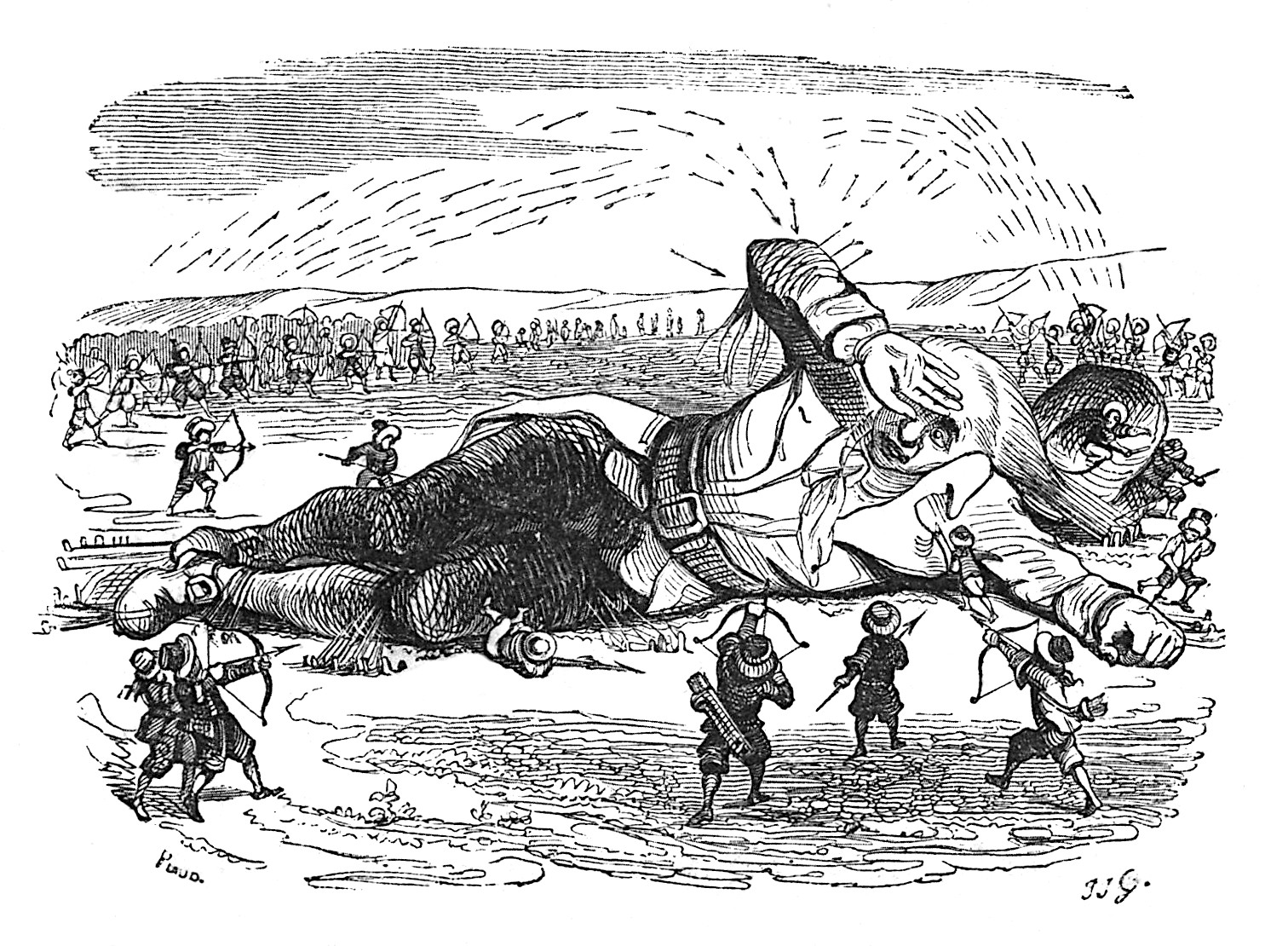
Gulliver captured by the Lilliputians (illustration by J.J. Grandville).

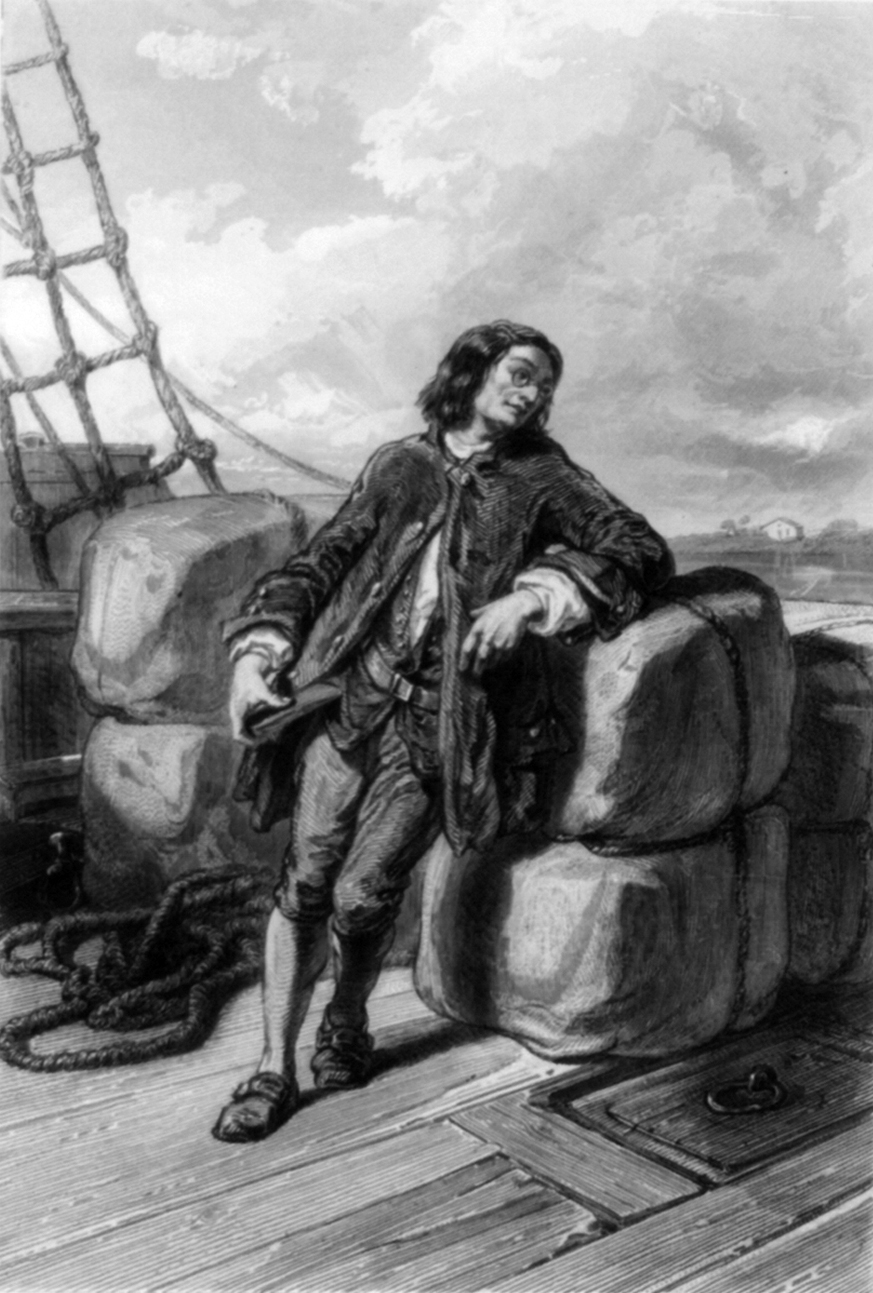
Captain Gulliver, from a French edition of Gulliver's Travels (1850s).

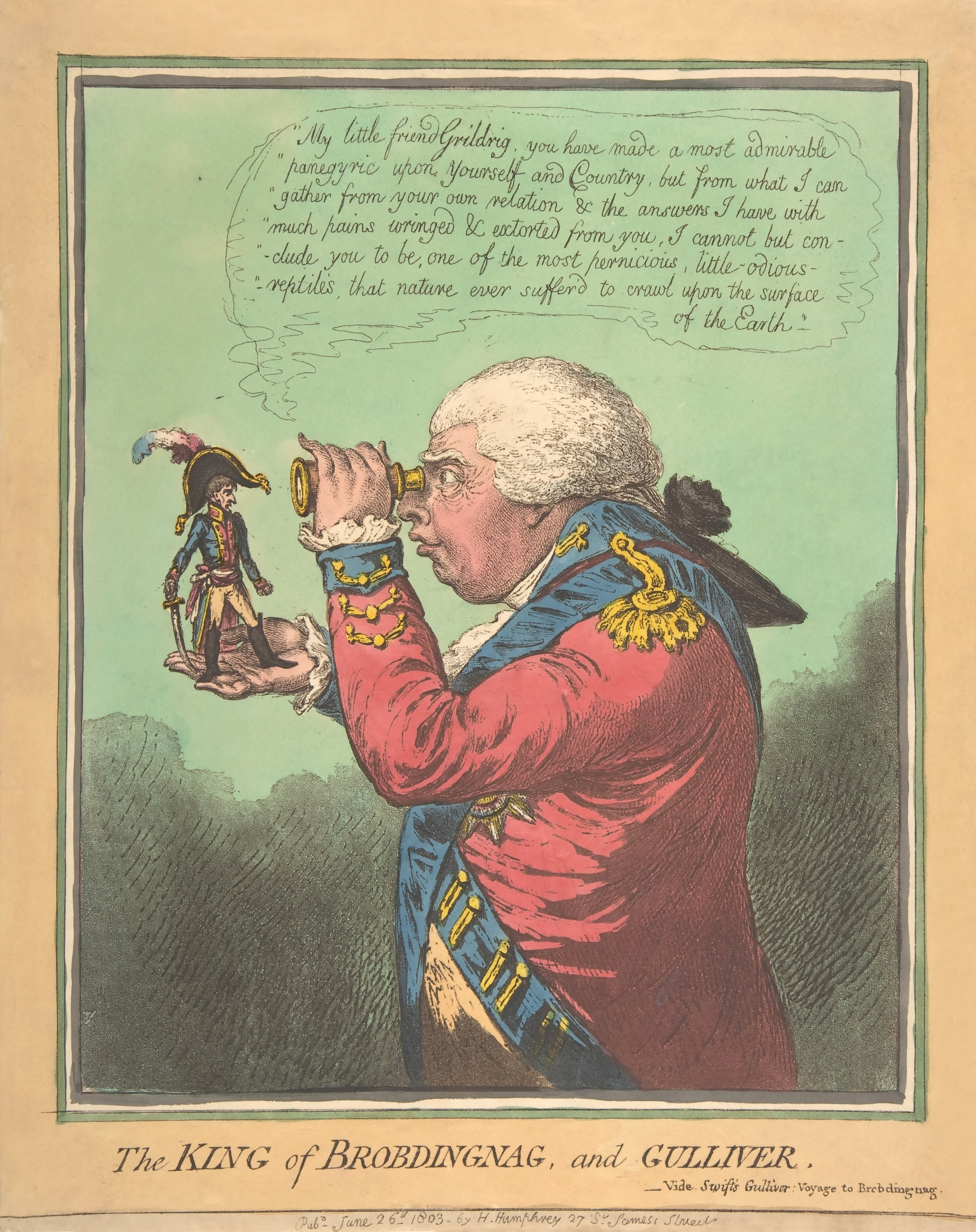
Lemuel Gulliver meets the King of Brobdingnag (1803), Metropolitan Museum of Art

Lemuel Gulliver (/ˈɡʌlɪvər/) is the fictional protagonist and narrator of Gulliver's Travels, a novel written by Jonathan Swift, first published in 1726.

== In Gulliver's Travels ==
According to Swift's novel, Gulliver was born in Nottinghamshire c. 1661, where his father had a small estate; the Gulliver family is said to have originated in Oxfordshire, however. He supposedly studied for three years (c. 1675–1678) at Emmanuel College, Cambridge, leaving to become an apprentice to an eminent London surgeon; after four years (c. 1678–1682), he left to study at the University of Leiden, a prominent Dutch university and medical school. He also educated himself in navigation and mathematics, leaving the university around 1685.

Prior to the voyages whose adventures are recounted in the novel, he is described as having travelled less remarkably to the Levant (c. 1685–1688) and later to the East Indies and West Indies (c. 1690–1696). In Brobdingnag, he compares a loud sound to the Niagara Falls, so presumably, he visited the place at some point. Between his travels, he married Miss Mary Burton (c. 1688), daughter of a London hosier. As of the time of his return from Lilliput, they had a son named Johnny, studying at grammar-school, and a daughter named Betty, married with children by the time Lemuel wrote his memoirs. Mary was pregnant with another child by the time her husband left on his last voyage. In his education and travels, Gulliver acquired some knowledge of "High and Low Dutch, Latin, French, Spanish, Italian, and Lingua Franca"; he later states that he understood some Greek and that he "understood (Portuguese) very well".

Gulliver's remarkable travels begin in 1699 and end in 1715, having changed Gulliver's personality to that of a recluse. He claims to have written his memoirs five years following his last return to England, i.e., in 1720 or 1721. The frontispiece to the 1726 edition of Gulliver's Travels shows a fictitious engraving of Gulliver at the age of 58 (i.e., c. 1719). An additional preface, attributed to Gulliver, added to a revised version of the work is given the fictional date of April 2, 1727, at which time Gulliver would have been about 65 or 66 years old. The earliest editions of the book credited Gulliver as the author, whom many at the time believed to be a real person. Swift, an Anglican clergyman, had published much of his work anonymously or pseudonymously.

== In sequels and spinoffs ==
- Hungarian writer Frigyes Karinthy reused Gulliver as the protagonist of two novels recounting his further travels, Voyage to Faremido (1916) and Capillaria (1921). Both stay true to the character as a surgeon with a wife and children, but transpose their plot (and retroactively Gulliver's four earlier travels) to the then-contemporary years leading up to, during, and after World War I.
- In the 1968 Doctor Who serial The Mind Robber, set in a world populated by fictional characters, Gulliver features extensively as a recurring supporting character. He is played by Bernard Horsfall, and repeatedly aids the Second Doctor (Patrick Troughton) and his companions. The Doctor notes that Gulliver "can only use the words Dean Swift gave him".
- In the 2007 comic The League of Extraordinary Gentlemen: Black Dossier by Alan Moore, Gulliver is the leader of the second incarnation of The League of Extraordinary Gentlemen in the 18th century, which then consists of The Scarlet Pimpernel and his wife Lady Blakeney, Fanny Hill (with whom Gulliver has been romantically involved), Dr Syn aka The Scarecrow, Nathaniel Bumppo and Orlando. Gulliver leads the League until his death of testicular cancer in 1799 and is buried in Lilliput. This version of Gulliver is evidently at least a generation younger than Swift's Gulliver; his dates have evidently been shifted forward in time to allow him to interact with other fictional characters of the later 18th century.
- Gulliver is mentioned throughout the recent Malplaquet trilogy of children's novels by Andrew Dalton. Taking much of their initial inspiration from T.H. White's Mistress Masham's Repose, the books describe the adventures of a large colony of Lilliputians living secretly in the enormous and mysterious grounds of an English country house (Stowe House in Buckinghamshire). In The Temples of Malplaquet, for example, Jamie Thompson (their human protector, aged 13) has a dream-like vision of the episode in which Gulliver is first captured by the Lilliputians.
- In the Gulliver's Travels film released in 2010, Gulliver, played by Jack Black, is a mail room worker who fancies himself a writer but plagiarizes most of his work from the Internet. After Gulliver is assigned to write a story about the Bermuda Triangle, his ship becomes lost at sea and he finds himself in Lilliput.

== In astronomy ==
On Mars's largest moon, Phobos, the crater Gulliver is named after him, while the crater Grildrig has the name given to Gulliver by the farmer's daughter Glumdalclitch in Brobdingnag, because of Swift's 'prediction' of the two then undiscovered Martian moons, which his Laputan astronomers had discovered.

== See also ==
- Lilliput and Blefuscu
- Brobdingnag
- Laputa
- Luggnagg
- The Engine

== Sources ==
- Gulliver's Travels by Jonathan Swift
