= Five in a Row =

Five in a Row may refer to:

- "Five in a Row" (1982 song)
- "Five in a Row" (1989 song), by The D-Generation
- Five in a Row (game) or Gomoku, a board game

== See also ==
- "Five More in a Row", a 1990 single by The D-Generation
