= Swank =

Swank may refer to:

== People ==
- Everett Swank (1913–2000), American basketball player
- Fletcher B. Swank (1875–1950), U.S. Representative from Oklahoma
- Hilary Swank (born 1974), two-time Academy Award-winning American actress
- Jean Swank, project scientist for NASA
- Michael Swank, American DJ and lead singer for Myka Relocate
- Sam Swank (born 1985), American football player
- Tod Swank, American skateboarder
- William Swank (born 1940), American sports writer

== Others ==
- Johnny Swank, an Australian radio comedy serial
- Swank Motion Pictures, a film distributor and licensor
- Swank Multiple Sclerosis Diet (after Dr. Roy Swank)
- SWANK, the backend of SLIME, an Emacs mode for developing Common Lisp applications
- Swank (magazine), a pornographic magazine
