= Cop This =

2026 Australian telemovie

- Genre: Comedy
- Created by: Ed Kavalee
- Written by: Ed Kavalee
- Directed by: Ed Kavalee; Peter Lawler
- Starring: Ed Kavalee; Nicolette Minster; Ray O'Leary
- Country of origin: Australia
- Original language: English

Production
- Executive producer: Greg Sitch
- Producers: Ed Kavalee; Antje Kulpe
- Running time: 74 minutes
- Production company: EHK Productions

Original release
- Network: Network 10
- Release: 5 October 2026

Cop This is a 2026 Australian telemovie broadcast on Network 10 on 5 October 2026. The film was directed by Ed Kavalee and Peter Lawler, Kavalee also served as the writer for the production. The production was mostly financed by Paramount Australia, with VicScreen providing the rest of the funding. Cop This was shot entirely within Channel 10's office building in Melbourne.

== Plot ==
On AFL Grand Final day, notice is provided to a suburban police station that all employees are set to be replaced with an artificial intelligence (AI)-powered terminal. The only remaining two officers at the station are tasked with minding a criminal in custody for 24 hours.

== Cast ==
The film features Australian actors and comedians including: Kavalee, Nicolette Minster, Ray O'Leary, Gary Sweet, Rob Carlton, Tony Martin, Anthony Lehmann, Dane Simpson, Celia Pacquola, Luke McGregor, Rob Sitch, Josh Lawson, Julia Morris, Dave Hughes, Dilruk Jayasinha, Lizzy Hoo, Tommy Little, Claire Hooper, Ryan Moloney, Lawrence Mooney, Mick Molloy, Glenn Robbins, Tom Gleisner, Kate Langbroek, Grant Denyer, Toby Truslove, Violeta Brau Mugica, Ash Williams, Anthony Selemidis, Ben Knight, David Quirk, Amy Ruffle, Nick Capper, Bron Lewis, Tiana Hogben, Firdi Billimoria, Ryan Shelton, Oliver Clark, Sonia Di Iorio and Rob Lloyd

== Reception ==
Writing for Guardian Australia, Luke Buckmaster rated Cop This one star out of five and called the show "onerously unfunny" but praised the depth of talent in the telemovie.

Anthony Morris of ScreenHub gave the film three and a half out of five stars and said "Not all the gags are winners, but much like the cameos, there’s enough that work to get this over the line."
