= Roy Allen =

Roy Allen may refer to:

- Roy Allen (pilot) (1918–1991), United States Army Air Forces bomber pilot
- Roy W. Allen (1882–1968), American entrepreneur
- Roy Allen (footballer) (1901–2001), Australian rules football player and umpire
- Sir R. G. D. Allen (Roy George Douglas Allen, 1906–1983), English economist, mathematician and statistician
- Roy Allen (tennis) (1868–1930), British tennis player
