= The Panel (Australian TV series) =

1998–2004 Australian television talk show

- Genre: Talk show
- Developed by: Working Dog Productions
- Presented by: Santo Cilauro; Tom Gleisner; Kate Langbroek; Glenn Robbins; Rob Sitch
- Country of origin: Australia
- Original language: English
- No. of seasons: 7
- No. of episodes: 237

Production
- Running time: 60 minutes (including commercials)

Original release
- Network: Network Ten
- Release: 18 February 1998 – 24 November 2004

Related
- The Panel (Irish TV series); The Panel (New Zealand TV series)

The Panel is an Australian television talk show that was broadcast by Network Ten and its affiliates; it was also simulcast on the Triple M radio network. The show was produced by Working Dog Productions and included several members of the former D-Generation and The Late Show casts.

The show featured a panel of five (originally six) people who discuss and joke about items in the news, current affairs, and pop culture. Episodes of The Panel screened at 9.30pm on Wednesday nights. Episodes were scheduled to run one hour but would often finish late, delaying the live news broadcast scheduled for 10.30pm immediately afterwards.

The series premiered in 1998 and was very popular in its first few years. Between 2003 and 2007 the show also broadcast an annual Christmas special.

== Panelists ==
The regular panelists are Glenn Robbins, Rob Sitch, Tom Gleisner, Kate Langbroek, and Santo Cilauro (usually sitting in this order from screen left to right at the desk). Jane Kennedy was the original 6th panelist, but later left the show. Gleisner would act as the MC, introducing guests and bookending segments; however, if he didn't appear in the episode, Cilauro would often play this role.

The series also frequently featured guest panelists, with other Australian comedians, actors, and international guests (such as American actor Harry Shearer) regularly taking a spot at the desk. Jo Stanley replaced Langbroek, who was on maternity leave, as a regular panelist for a number of shows in 2004.

Brian Nankervis performed warm-up for the audience. The floor manager was Annie Maver, the then-wife of comedian Tony Martin.

== Guests ==
Guests include music and movie stars, sports heroes and political figures, but they also featured many lower-profile individuals who have interesting stories to tell, including round-the-world sailor Jesse Martin, or sexual health physician Dr. Cindy Pan. A number of regular guests also appear to help present segments. These include sports reporter Stephen Quartermain, film reviewer Lawrie Zion, and Hollywood correspondent Jeff Stilson.

Popstar Anastacia also made an appearance while promoting her debut album Not That Kind, back in 2000, where she sang exclusively the song "I'm Outta Love" in an a cappella version.

One of the most "excruciating" interviews, as Tom Gleisner described it, was in 2002 when Tommy Lee Jones was in the studio with Will Smith to promote their film Men in Black II. Jones did not respond positively to any of the good humour of the interviewers and provided very brief answers.

All Aussie Adventures host, Russell Coight (played by Glenn Robbins), appeared in character on one episode. Robbins did not appear as a panellist that week. Robbins also appeared as both himself and his Kath & Kim character Kel Knight during the 2007 Christmas Special.

== Christmas specials ==
Starting in 2003, a special Christmas episode of the show aired on Christmas night, outside the regular broadcast season of the series. It has been promoted under varying titles, including The Panel Christmas Special and The Panel Christmas Wrap.

The extended-length episode (usually two to three hours long) combines regular segments of the show, including live music performances and celebrity guests, with retrospectives on the past year. Live advertorials for the show's sponsors are also performed by the cast, with the proceeds going to charity. The specials always finish with a pantomime of deliberately dubious quality revolving around the birth of Jesus.

Christmas specials continued to be produced for some years after regular series production ended, with the latest special broadcast in 2007. Although initially planned, there was no special in 2008 due to Working Dog's commitment to The Hollowmen.

== Spin-offs ==
The success of the show has resulted in successful spin off shows in Ireland (hosted by Dara Ó Briain; see The Panel (Irish TV series)) and New Zealand (hosted by Cal Wilson). Another spin-off, supposedly the Afghanistan version, was introduced on the 2005 Christmas special.

It has also led to the release of several albums in the Music – Live from the Panel series, consisting of songs performed on the show by local and international artists. Performances on The Panel were frequently performed acoustically or with minimal instrumental backing, as opposed to a full band.

== Controversy ==
Network Ten and The Panel have been parties to a number of media law cases. They are in a long-running dispute with the Nine Network in the Federal Court of Australia regarding an episode of The Panel and its broadcast of footage from Nine shows. Several appeals and related decisions have been made in the Federal Court (FCA), the Full Court of the Federal Court (FCAFC) and the High Court of Australia (HCA):

- TCN Channel Nine Pty Limited v Network Ten Limited [2001] FCA 108 (20 February 2001), Federal Court (Australia)
- TCN Channel Nine v Network [2001] FCA 841 (4 July 2001), Federal Court (Australia)
- TCN Channel Nine Pty Ltd v Network Ten Pty Limited [2002] FCAFC 146 (22 May 2002), Federal Court (Full Court) (Australia)
- Network Ten Pty Ltd v TCN Channel Nine [2004] HCA 14, (2004) 218 CLR 273, High Court (Australia)
- TCN Channel Nine Pty Limited v Network Ten Pty Limited (No 2) [2005] FCAFC 53 (26 May 2005), Federal Court (Full Court) (Australia)
- TCN Channel Nine Pty Limited v Network Ten Pty Limited (No 3) [2005] FCAFC 194 (8 September 2005), Federal Court (Full Court) (Australia)

In its first year, the show gained some notice when Rob Sitch uttered the word "fuck", then taboo for a live program, on air when inquiring about television presenter Donna Gubbay. Gubbay had presented a story on her program E! News where she introduced a story about panelist Kate Langbroek with the words "Who the hell is Kate Langbroek?" After playing the footage, Sitch retorted "who the hell is Kate Langbroek? Well, who the fuck are you?"

In 2003 Langbroek faced some criticism after breastfeeding her first-born child live on air shortly after giving birth.

== See also ==
- List of Australian television series
