= Ed Kavalee =

Australian comedian and radio and television presenter (born 1979)

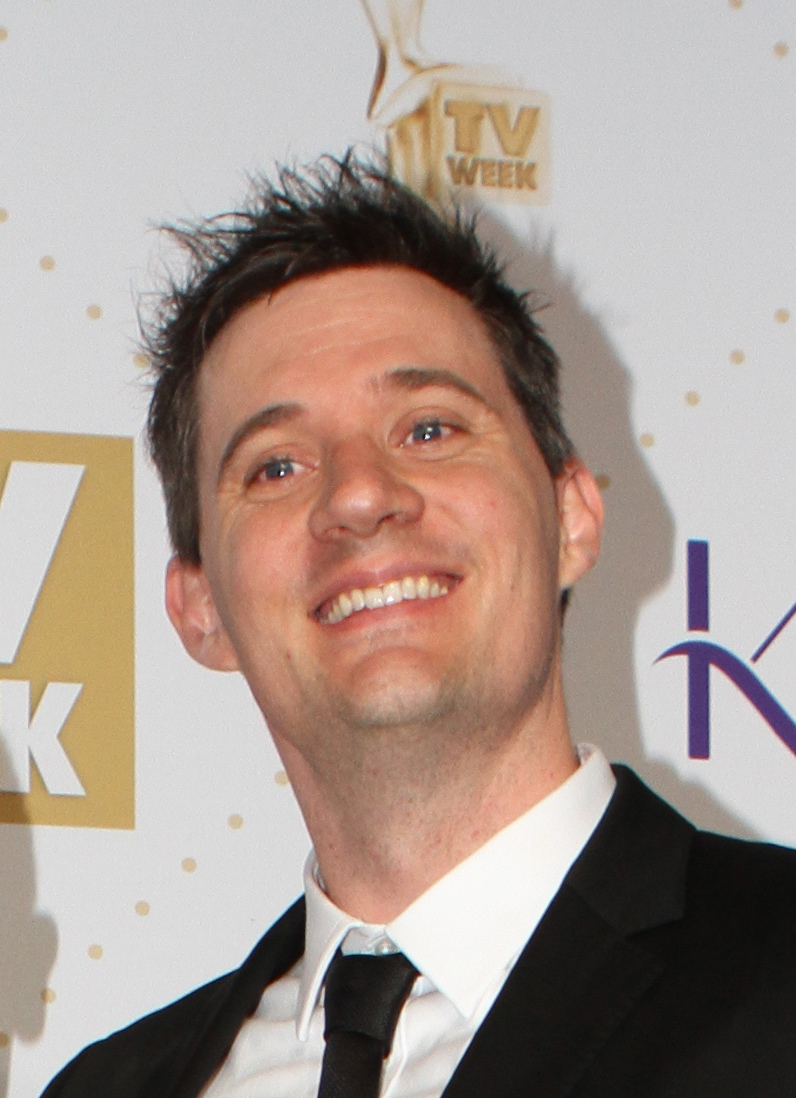
- Kavalee in 2016
- Born: 30 June 1979 (age 47); Sydney, New South Wales, Australia
- Occupations: Comedian; actor; writer; podcaster; radio and television presenter
- Years active: 2005–present
- Known for: Have You Been Paying Attention?
- Spouse: Tiffiny Hall (m. 2014)
- Children: 2

Edward Robert Kavalee (born 30 June 1979) is an Australian comedian, actor, writer, podcaster, radio and television presenter and association football commentator. He is a recurring panellist on Network 10's Have You Been Paying Attention? with Sam Pang.

Kavalee is a former host of Hughesy, Ed & Erin and Ash, Grant & Ed on 2Day FM and the Marto, Ed & Robin breakfast show on Triple M Brisbane. He has hosted a number of television shows, including TV Burp and various sports-themed comedy shows along with Santo Cilauro and Sam Pang.

== Career ==
Kavalee is an experienced Theatresports performer. He had been involved in running Theatresports workshops at the University of New South Wales (Studio 4, New South Wales University's comedy society), and for a number of years, he hosted Theatresports at the University of Sydney. Before his career on radio with Triple M, Kavalee began working in a small video store at the age of fourteen for a period of eight and a half years, and was a panel operator and part of the promotions team with the Triple M Rock Patrol vehicles, The Black Thunders.

Kavalee is a graduate of Screenwise. Three months before he graduated, he scored the pilot and a part on the ensemble cast of Working Dog Productions' improvised comedy show Thank God You're Here. He appeared in more than 20 episodes of the show in 2006 and remained a member of the ensemble cast in the 2nd, 3rd and 4th series.

In 2006, Kavalee joined with co-host Tony Martin and panel operator Richard Marsland for the Triple M radio comedy show Get This which featured comedy sketches, celebrity guests and banter on trivia and current affairs. The show was a ratings success and soon developed a devoted assembly of loyal fans including English comedian Ross Noble who commented in an interview in 2012 that Get This, although off-air for five years, remained his all-time favourite radio show. But after two years, Austereo made the controversial decision to axe the program. Despite the protests from fans and supporters, the show finished in November 2007. In December 2008, Kavalee and Martin recorded a special tribute podcast dedicated to the memory of Richard Marsland who died earlier that month.

In 2008, Kavalee joined The Wrong Way Home with Akmal Saleh and Cal Wilson on the Nova Network. Before Kavalee joined he was a guest co-host while Wilson took time off for her wedding.

In 2009, Kavalee was appointed as anchor on Nova 100's Hughesy & Kate breakfast show, replacing Tim Blackwell who hosted the Nova Nights show Launchpad with Hayley Pearson.

Kavalee hosted TV Burp on the Seven Network in mid 2009, which was the Australian TV series that was based on the original version of the UK's TV series Harry Hill's TV Burp. He co-hosted Santo, Sam and Ed's Cup Fever! with Santo Cilauro and Sam Pang on SBS TV, which was a light-hearted look at the 2010 FIFA World Cup, running for the duration of the championships. Kavalee was reunited with his former co-host on Get This, Tony Martin, for The Joy of Sets on the Nine Network. This comedy television series, looking at the elements used to construct television shows, commenced screening on 20 September 2011 in the 9:00 pm Tuesday timeslot on Nine. The eighth and final episode aired on 8 November 2011. Although initial ratings were impressive, subsequent figures were disappointing and midway through the series, it was moved to a later timeslot of 10.30pm.

In December 2011, Kavalee resigned from Nova 100 to focus on TV and film work. In 2012, he appeared in the Australian film Any Questions for Ben? directed by Rob Sitch. Kavalee co-hosted Santo, Sam and Ed's Sports Fever! on the Seven network, a spin-off from the SBS series in 2010. He was also a regular guest on the TV show Agony Uncles (ABC-TV). He also worked on the comedy film Scumbus in which he starred, co-wrote, co-produced and largely self-funded. The comedy film focusses on a pair of under-achieving policemen and was shot in only 11 days, featuring a cast of well-known names in Australian comedy. The film aired on Ch-10 on 10 November 2012, received positive reviews and was selected for screening at the Los Angeles Comedy Festival. At the end of 2012, Kavalee was seeking a distributor for his second feature film entitled Border Protection Squad, the film has been written, directed and also co-produced by himself and is a comedy that takes a satirical swipe at TV shows such as Ch-7's Border Security. The film was made available for downloads on iTunes in 2015.

In January 2014, Kavalee joined Triple M Brisbane's The Grill Team with Marto, Michelle & Ed breakfast show as a co-host. He is also one of two regular panellists on the Network Ten comedy quiz show Have You Been Paying Attention?, the other being Sam Pang.

In October 2017, Kavalee announced that he would be leaving the Marto, Ed & Robin breakfast show on Triple M Brisbane at the end of the year to spend more time with his family. The announcement came not long after his wife, Tiffiny Hall, had given birth to their son.

In November 2017, Southern Cross Austereo announced that Kavalee would be joining Em Rusciano to co-host breakfast on 2Day FM replacing Harley Breen. It was later announced in December that Grant Denyer would join the show. Em, Grant & Ed remained on air until Southern Cross Austereo announced that it would end on Friday 16 August 2019 and will be replaced by a music focused show.

Kavalee quickly moved over to a temporary role on Southern Cross Austereo's Hit Network national afternoon show, Hughesy & Kate, after Kate Langbroek announced she wasn't coming back to the show, or Australia, until 2020. Kavalee will stand in alongside Dave Hughes until at least the end of 2019.

In November 2020, Southern Cross Austereo announced that Kavelee, Dave Hughes and Erin Molan would replace Jamie Angel to host The 2Day FM Morning Crew with Hughesy, Ed and Erin Molan from Monday, 18 January 2021. A one-hour highlights package will air nationally at 6pm across the Hit Network.

In August 2024, Southern Cross Austereo announced that Hughesy, Ed & Erin had been axed with 2Day FM taking a new direction. The last show aired on Wednesday 7 August. Jimmy & Nath will host breakfast for the remainder of the year.

In March 2025, Kavalee was announced to be competing on the forthcoming ninth season of Network 10's The Amazing Race Australia alongside his wife Tiffiny Hall. The couple were eliminated after the first leg, ultimately finishing in last position.

=== Radio ===
- Get This (2006–2007)
- The Wrong Way Home with Akmal, Cal and Ed (2008)
- Hughesy & Kate – co-host and anchor (2009 – 2011)
- Summer Breakfast on Triple M – Host – (December 2013)
- The Grill Team with Marto, Michelle & Ed – anchor (January 2014 – May 2015)
- Marto & Ed Kavalee – co-host (May 2015 – December 2016)
- Marto, Ed & Robin – co-host (January 2017 – December 2017)
- Em, Grant & Ed – co-host (January 2018 – September 2018)
- Ash, Grant & Ed – co-host (January 2019 – August 2019)
- Hughesy & Kate – fill-in presenter (August 2019 – December 2019)
- Hughesy & Ed – co-host (January 2020 – December 2020)
- Hughesy, Ed & Erin - co-host (January 2021 – August 2024)

=== Television ===
- Thank God You're Here (2006–2009)
- KFC Australia television commercials (2006)
- Newstopia (2007)
- Chandon Pictures (2007)
- Out of the Question (2008)
- Good News Week (2008)
- TV Burp (2009)
- Santo, Sam and Ed's Cup Fever! (2010, 2018, 2026)
- The Joy of Sets (2011)
- Santo, Sam and Ed's Sports Fever! (2012)
- Agony Uncles (2012)
- Have You Been Paying Attention? (2013–present)
- Santo, Sam and Ed's Total Football (2013 – 2015)
- "Red Rooster" Australian television commercial (2015)
- "Toyota" Australian television commercial (2016)
- True Story with Hamish & Andy (episode 5 – "Jack's Story") as Firefighter Garry.
- "Red Rooster" Australian television commercial (2018)
- Celebrity Name Game (2019)
- Dancing with the Stars (2020)
- Thank God You're Here — cameos (2023)
- "Youi" Australian television commercials (2025)
- The Amazing Race Australia (2025)
- Cop This (2026)

=== Film ===
- No Regrets (2003)
- Meat Pie (USA: Going Down Under) (2005)
- BoyTown (2006)
- BoyTown Confidential (2007)
- $quid (2007)
- Any Questions for Ben? (2012)
- Scumbus (2012)
- Border Protection Squad (2015)
- That's Not My Dog! (2018)

=== Theatre ===
- Lucky (2006)

== Personal life ==
Kavalee's surname is Thai-Chinese, and he has stated that "one area of [his] family is Thai Chinese". Kavalee's Sydney-born father Charles Keith Hyland moved to Bangkok after serving in World War II, and established a duck feather processing plant in Chợ Lớn, Vietnam, where he was imprisoned by the Viet Cong in 1968. Hyland married American model Lisa Ludlow in 1967, unsuccessfully filed for divorce in 1970, and from 1972 onwards attempted to prevent his wife and children from inheriting his estate. Kavalee, born in 1979, identified his mother as a former model who raised him as a single parent, and did not know his father's identity until the latter died in 1989. In a 1997-98 New South Wales Court of Appeal case, the mother of "Edward Hyland Kavalee" was named as Elizabeth Kavalee.

In 2014, Kavalee married celebrity trainer, fitness promoter and writer Tiffiny Hall. They have a son born in September 2017, and welcomed a baby girl on 30 May 2022.
