= Sam Pang =

Australian comedian, presenter, and writer

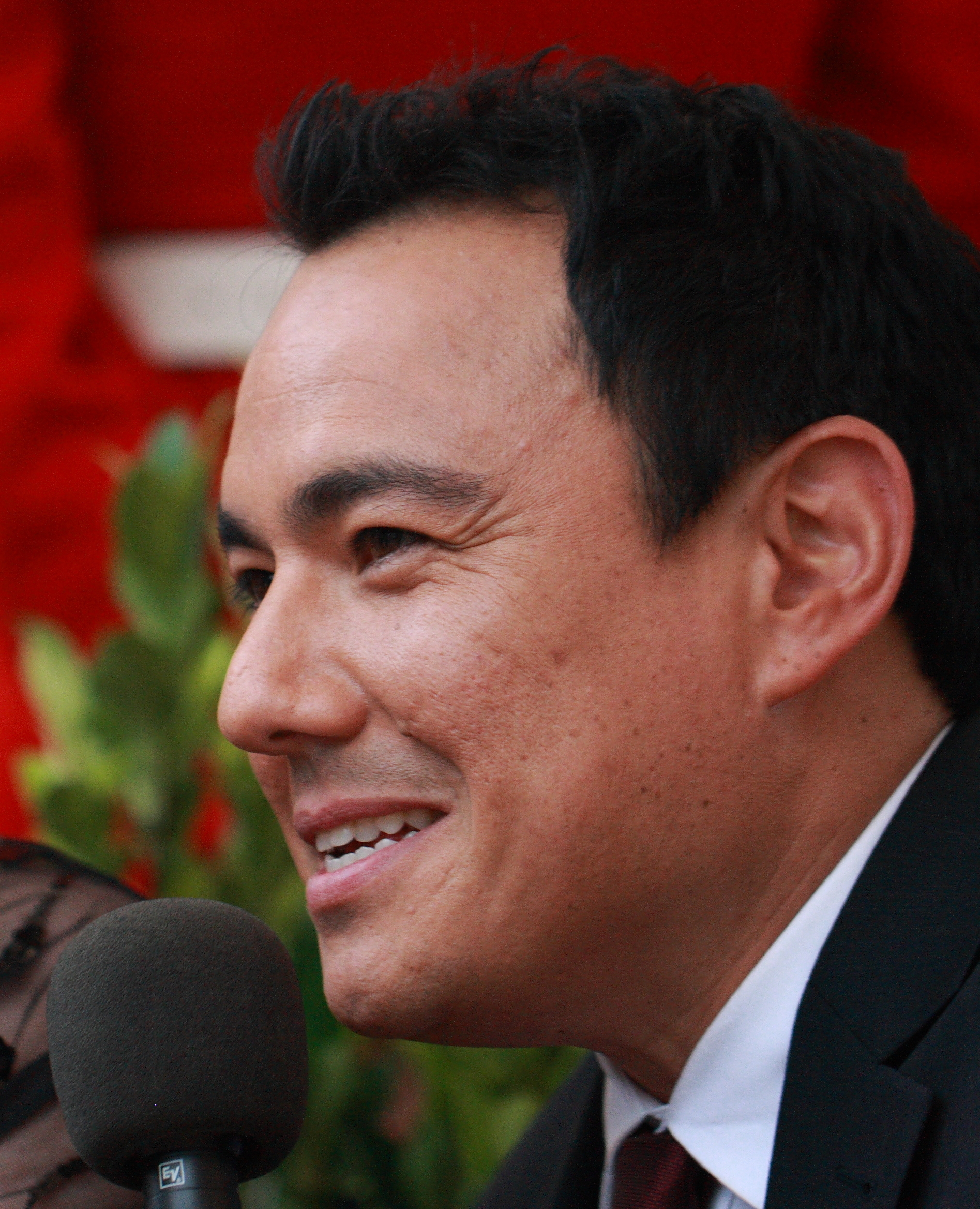
- Pang at the 2012 Australian Paralympian of the Year ceremony
- Born: Samuel Pang; November 3, 1973 (age 52); Melbourne, Victoria, Australia
- Occupations: Comedian; radio and television presenter; writer; producer
- Years active: 2001−present
- Employer(s): Network 10; Seven Network; Australian Broadcasting Corporation
- Television: Have You Been Paying Attention? The Front Bar; Sam Pang Tonight; Ground Up
- Awards: Gold Logie (2026)

Samuel Pang (born November 3, 1973) is an Australian comedian, television presenter, writer, producer and former radio host. He won the Gold Logie Award in 2026.

Pang is a host of The Front Bar with Mick Molloy and Andy Maher and is a regular panellist, alongside Ed Kavalee, on Network 10's Have You Been Paying Attention?. He also hosts his own weekly variety tonight show Sam Pang Tonight and plays the lead role in ABC comedy Ground Up, which satirises the development of the Tasmanian football team. Pang has hosted the Logie Awards in 2023, 2024 and 2025.

He was the host of Chrissie, Sam & Browny on Nova 100 with Chrissie Swan and Jonathan Brown.

== Early life and education ==
Pang attended Gold Street Primary School with Lidia Thorpe. He also attended Balwyn High School. Pang studied marketing at university.

== Career ==
=== Football ===
Pang played Australian rules football for the Collingwood under-19s team in 1991. He played six games and kicked one goal. Collingwood made the grand final in the final season of the under-19s competition but Pang was not selected. In 1992, he moved to Sebastopol in the Ballarat Football League where he was coached by former Carlton champion, Wayne Johnston. He then played six senior matches for Prahran in the VFA where he was coached by former VFL player, Brian Taylor, when selected in the senior side.

Pang went on to play country football in regional Victoria, and for Sandy Bay in Tasmania for a number of years. He was involved with the Tongala Football Club in the Goulburn Valley Football League from 1996 to 1998. He remained in the city, holding down a range of odd jobs, and received a small fee for his football services.

=== Radio ===
Pang turned to radio hosting at the age of 28, at the urging of his friends. He co-hosted Triple R's Breakfasters program for five years (2004-2008).

In January 2011, Pang presented Summer Nights on ABC Local Radio.

During the 2012 London Olympics, alongside Santo Cilauro, Pang presented The Rush Hour on Melbourne's Triple M while regular hosts James Brayshaw and Billy Brownless were at the Olympics.

From February to April 2011, Pang appeared on the radio-comedy programme The Lonely Hearts Club which was broadcast on Saturday nights from 10 pm to midnight on ABC Radio National. The show, played completely straight, featured an uncredited Pang appearing under the pseudonym of sports journalist Terry Wood, alongside Angus Sampson, Stephen Curry and Tony Martin as other fictional co-hosts.

In January 2016, Pang was appointed co-host of the Nova 100 breakfast program, Chrissie, Sam & Browny, with Chrissie Swan and Jonathan Brown. The show ran for seven years, ending in December 2022.

In September 2016, Pang joined Santo Cilauro and Ed Kavalee to co-host a podcast version of Santo, Sam and Ed's Total Football on ABC Radio.

=== Television ===
Pang has hosted a variety of television shows. His first hosting role was in 2009, when he hosted ADbc, a quiz show based on history-related topics. It aired on SBS One and lasted for one season.

In 2009, Pang started doing commentary work with Julia Zemiro on the Eurovision Song Contest, as part of the Australian delegation. He remained in that role until 2017.

In 2010, with Santo Cilauro and Ed Kavalee, Pang co-hosted Santo, Sam and Ed's Cup Fever!, a variety/panel/sports program coinciding with the FIFA World Cup airing on SBS TV. He has written for TV Burp, which was also hosted by Kavalee, on Channel Seven.

In February 2012, Pang reunited with Cilauro and Kavalee to co-host a spin-off of Cup Fever on Channel Seven called Santo, Sam and Ed's Sports Fever!. In August 2012, he was one of the reporters for ABC2 at the 2012 Paralympic Games in London.

In late 2013, Pang co-hosted Santo, Sam and Ed's Total Football on Fox Sports, again with Cilauro and Kavalee. The show lasted two seasons, finishing in 2015.

Since 2013, Pang has been a regular panellist on Network 10's weekly game show, Have You Been Paying Attention?, which has won numerous Logie Awards.

In 2015, alongside Mick Molloy and Andy Maher, Pang began co-hosting The Front Bar, which airs on Channel Seven.

Pang presented a 2017 Logie Award with Lorrae Desmond, his mother's cousin. Six years later, he hosted the Logie Awards in 2023, becoming the first solo host of the event in eleven years, since Shane Bourne hosted the 2011 ceremony. Pang went on to host the Logie Awards again in 2024 and 2025.

In September 2024, it was announced that Pang would be hosting a weekly talk/variety show, Sam Pang Tonight, which then premiered on Network 10 on 17 March 2025. The series was renewed for a second season in April 2025, set to return in the second half of the year. The second season premiered on 13 October 2025.

Pang plays the lead character in ABC comedy series Ground Up, which satirises the development of a football club and stadium in Tasmania. The program premiered in June 2026.

In 2026, Pang won his first Gold Logie for most popular Personality on Australian Television.

== Personal life ==
Pang met his future wife Adriana Pesavento when he was attempting to become a stand-up comedian. They married in the early 2000s, and have one daughter named Sienna. Pang is of Chinese descent, and is related to Australian actress Lorrae Desmond through his mother. As of 2012, he had a pet falcon named Hank.
