= Out of the Question (game show) =

- Genre: Chat and game show
- Written by: Aleisha McCormack
- Directed by: Peter Lawler
- Presented by: Glenn Robbins
- Theme music composer: Leonardo Esposito; Jordan Roach
- Country of origin: Australia
- Original language: English
- No. of seasons: 1
- No. of episodes: 16

Production
- Executive producers: Nick Murray; Glenn Robbins
- Producer: Toni Malone
- Production location: HSV studios
- Editor: Jason Felmingham
- Camera setup: Multi-camera
- Running time: 30 minutes (including commercials)

Original release
- Network: Seven Network
- Release: 31 January – 26 November 2008

Out of the Question was an Australian chat and game show hosted by comedian Glenn Robbins. The show features Robbins quizzing celebrity guests on current events and popular culture. Each episode is recorded at Melbourne's HSV-7 digital studios at Melbourne Docklands within 48 hours of its airing.

The show premiered on Thursday 31 January 2008 on the Seven Network. Despite lacklustre prime time ratings for the initial batch of seven episodes, the show returned on 29 September 2008 at a later timeslot.

The show was not recommissioned beyond 2008, with Robbins suggesting in a later interview that he was more suited to a guest role rather than a role as host.

== Format ==
Each week, several celebrity guests competed against each other in a three-round quiz revolving around current events and popular culture. In between questions, lighthearted discussion often took place about the subject of the question. The first season featured three guests per episode, with each guest answering questions individually; the second season expanded the number of guests to four, with guests competing as pairs.

Robbins asked the guests a series of questions in turn for the first two rounds, while in the final round each guest or pair can buzz in at any time to answer. Each correct answer earned them a point, but in practice points were generally given out at Robbins' own discretion. The guest or pair with the most points at the end of the show won and got their name engraved on an Out of the Question trophy.

== List of episodes ==
No.	Guests	Winner	Original release date
1	Fifi Box, Ed Kavalee, Tony Moclair	Ed Kavalee	31 January 2008
2	Fifi Box, Tony Moclair, Peter Rowsthorn	Tony Moclair	7 February 2008
3	Ed Kavalee, Ross Noble, Chrissie Swan	Ross Noble	14 February 2008
4	Fifi Box, Tony Moclair, Lawrence Mooney	Lawrence Mooney	21 February 2008
5	Ed Kavalee, Kate Langbroek, Tony Moclair	Kate Langbroek	28 February 2008
6	Danny Bhoy, Fifi Box, Tony Moclair	Fifi Box	6 March 2008
7	Ed Kavalee, Lawrence Mooney, Santo Cilauro	Ed Kavalee	13 March 2008
8	Fifi Box, Tony Moclair, Lawrence Mooney, Julian Morrow	TBA	29 September 2008
9	Kate Langbroek, Fifi Box, Carl Barron, Lawrence Mooney	Kate Langbroek, Fifi Box	6 October 2008
10	Ed Kavalee, Peter Rowsthorn, Marty Sheargold, Jimeoin	TBA	TBA
11	Lawrence Mooney, Fifi Box, Shane Warne, Frank Woodley	TBA	TBA
12	Kate Langbroek, Lawrence Mooney, Mick Molloy, Mark Watson	TBA	TBA
13	Peter Rowsthorn, Fifi Box, Tony Moclair, Colin Lane	TBA	TBA
14	Lawrence Mooney, Wil Anderson, Felicity Ward, Rob Schneider	TBA	TBA
15	Lawrence Mooney, Fifi Box, Tom Gleisner, Josh Lawson	TBA	TBA
16	Frank Woodley, Kate Langbroek, Ed Kavalee	TBA	TBA
