= The Front Bar =

Australian sports television series

- Presented by: Andy Maher; Mick Molloy; Sam Pang
- Country of origin: Australia
- Original language: English
- No. of seasons: 7
- No. of episodes: 200+

Production
- Production locations: Seven Broadcast Centre Melbourne (2017–present); All Nations Hotel; Richmond, Melbourne, Victoria (2015–2016)
- Running time: 60 minutes (including advertisements)
- Production company: Front Bar Entertainment

Original release
- Network: AFL.com.au (2015–16); Seven Network (2016–present); 7mate (2016–present)
- Release: March 2015 – present

The Front Bar (formerly Friday Front Bar) is an Australian Football League–based talk show that airs on the Seven Network. The show is hosted by journalist Andy Maher and comedians Mick Molloy and Sam Pang.

== Overview ==
The series, which typically airs from March to September during the AFL season, is produced by Front Bar Entertainment, a group operated by Molloy, with episodes generally featuring the hosts and special guests drinking beer as they discuss the week's topics in a light hearted way. To date, the guest pool has included Kevin Bartlett, Brian Taylor and Jason Dunstall. In 2019, they also welcomed Garry Lyon as a guest, which was significant since he had been a longtime co-host of The Footy Show, and in similar fashion later welcomed Billy Brownless as a guest in 2022.

In 2018, during the AFL offseason, the show made an edition of the show centred on the 2018 Winter Olympics in Pyeongchang. Later that same year, they also did specials that tied-in with the 2018 Commonwealth Games on the Gold Coast, and in November that year a Melbourne Cup edition of the show was broadcast ahead of the 2018 Melbourne Cup. In November 2019, two cricket-themed episodes aired ahead of the Australian cricket season, and this has continued on in the following years. Since 2022, an edition of the show covering and featuring guests from other sporting disciplines such as Mick Doohan, Lauren Jackson and Pat Rafter, titled The Front Bar: All Sports, has also aired prior to the AFL season.

Initially, until 2022, the show was sponsored by Carlton Draught beer; the show had received some criticism for being an extended advertisement for the brand. For 2023, the show signed a new deal with Furphy.

== Hosts ==
=== Regular ===
- Andy Maher, journalist, SEN commentator and Carlton supporter
- Mick Molloy, comedian and Richmond supporter
- Sam Pang, comedian and Carlton supporter

=== Semi-regular ===
- Andy Lee, comedian and Carlton supporter
- Ryan Fitzgerald, retired Sydney and Adelaide player and Adelaide supporter
- Santo Cilauro, comedian, writer, filmmaker and Collingwood supporter
- Titus O’Reily, comedian, writer, broadcaster and Melbourne supporter
- Mark Knight, Herald Sun editorial cartoonist and AFL premiership poster creator
- Marty Sheargold, comedian and North Melbourne supporter
- Luke Darcy, Channel 7 commentator and retired Western Bulldogs player
- Matthew Richardson, Channel 7 commentator and retired Richmond player
- Lawrence Mooney, comedian, actor and writer

=== Behind-The-Scenes ===
- Danny McGinlay, comedian and Western Bulldogs supporter
- Adam Rozenbachs, comedian and writer, and Carlton supporter

== Broadcast history ==
The show launched as the Friday Front Bar in 2015 as an online-only show on the official AFL website, AFL.com.au; hosts Molloy and Maher had previously worked together on Before the Game. In 2016, the Seven Network picked up the show, with episodes being split into two versions, with snippets of the show being uploaded to AFL.com.au on Friday afternoon and the full version of the program airing after the Friday night match on the Seven Network in the traditional AFL states and on 7mate in New South Wales and Queensland. Episodes were filmed at the All Nations Hotel in Richmond in the first two seasons of the show.

In 2017, the show was renamed to The Front Bar and extended to a one-hour studio-based format airing on Thursday nights, occasionally airing after the Thursday night match when played during the season. In April, the show moved timeslots from 9:30pm to 8:30pm to go head-to-head with the Nine Network's long-running The Footy Show. The show consistently beat The Footy Show in the ratings beginning in the latter half of the 2017 season and continuing until Nine Network axed The Footy Show in 2019. In 2019, their Grand Final show was held at the Hotel Esplanade in St Kilda, and included AFL CEO Gillon McLachlan as a guest and Picket Palace as the house band.

In 2022, the show received its first Logie Awards nomination as it was nominated for the Logie Award for Most Popular Panel or Current Affairs Program.

== Episodes ==
=== 2023 ===
Episode	Edition	Guests	Air date
	AFL	Tex Walker; Ang Christou; Anthony Koutoufides	14 September 2023
	AFL	Sandy Roberts; Andrew Dillon; Gillon McLachlan	21 September 2023
	AFL - Grand Final Special	Damien Hardwick; Toby Greene; Tim Rogers	28 September 2023
	All-Sports	Nathan Lyon; Damien Oliver	23 November 2023
	All-Sports	Wasim Akram	30 November 2023

=== 2024 ===
Episode	Edition	Guests	Air date
1	All-Sports	Pat Cash; Henry Young	15 February 2024
2	All-Sports	Eric Bana; Luc Longley; Horace Grant	22 February 2024
3	All-Sports	Cathy Freeman; Mal Meninga	29 February 2024
4	AFL	Josh Daicos; Nick Daicos; Peter Daicos	7 March 2024
5	AFL	Trent Cotchin; Andrew Dillon; Lawrence Mooney	13 March 2024
6	AFL	Nic Naitanui; Greg Williams	20 March 2024
7	AFL	Titus O'Reily; Tom Liberatore; Neil Balme	27 March 2024
8	AFL (Gather Round Special)	John Platten; Darren Jarman; Andrew Jarman; John Cahill; Mark Williams; Malcolm Blight	3 April 2024
9	AFL	Mark Zanotti; Graham Teasdale	10 April 2024
10	AFL	Ben Cousins	17 April 2024
11	AFL	Mark McGough; Kevin Sheedy; Dane Swan	23 April 2024
12	AFL	Anthony Rocca	1 May 2024
13	AFL	Mal Michael; Laura Kane	8 May 2024
14	AFL	Michael McLean	15 May 2024
15	AFL (Indigenous Round Special)	Leon Davis; Michael O'Loughlin; Derek Kickett; Michael Long	22 May 2024
16	AFL	Dwayne Russell	29 May 2024

== Golden Cometti ==
Since 2016, The Front Bar has awarded the Golden Cometti to the funniest or most comical piece of commentary of the season. The award is named in honour of commentary legend Dennis Cometti, who retired from broadcasting AFL matches on Channel Seven in 2016.

=== Past Golden Cometti winners ===
Year	Winner
2016	Barry Hall
2017	Basil Zempilas
2018	Matthew Richardson (footballer)
2019	Mark Ricciuto
2020	Bruce McAvaney
2021	Luke Darcy
2022	Kelli Underwood
2023	Mark Robinson (journalist)
2024	Andy Maher
2025	Leigh Montagna
2026	Mark Ricciuto

== See also ==
- List of Australian television series
