= Andrew Maher =

Australian sports journalist

Andy Maher
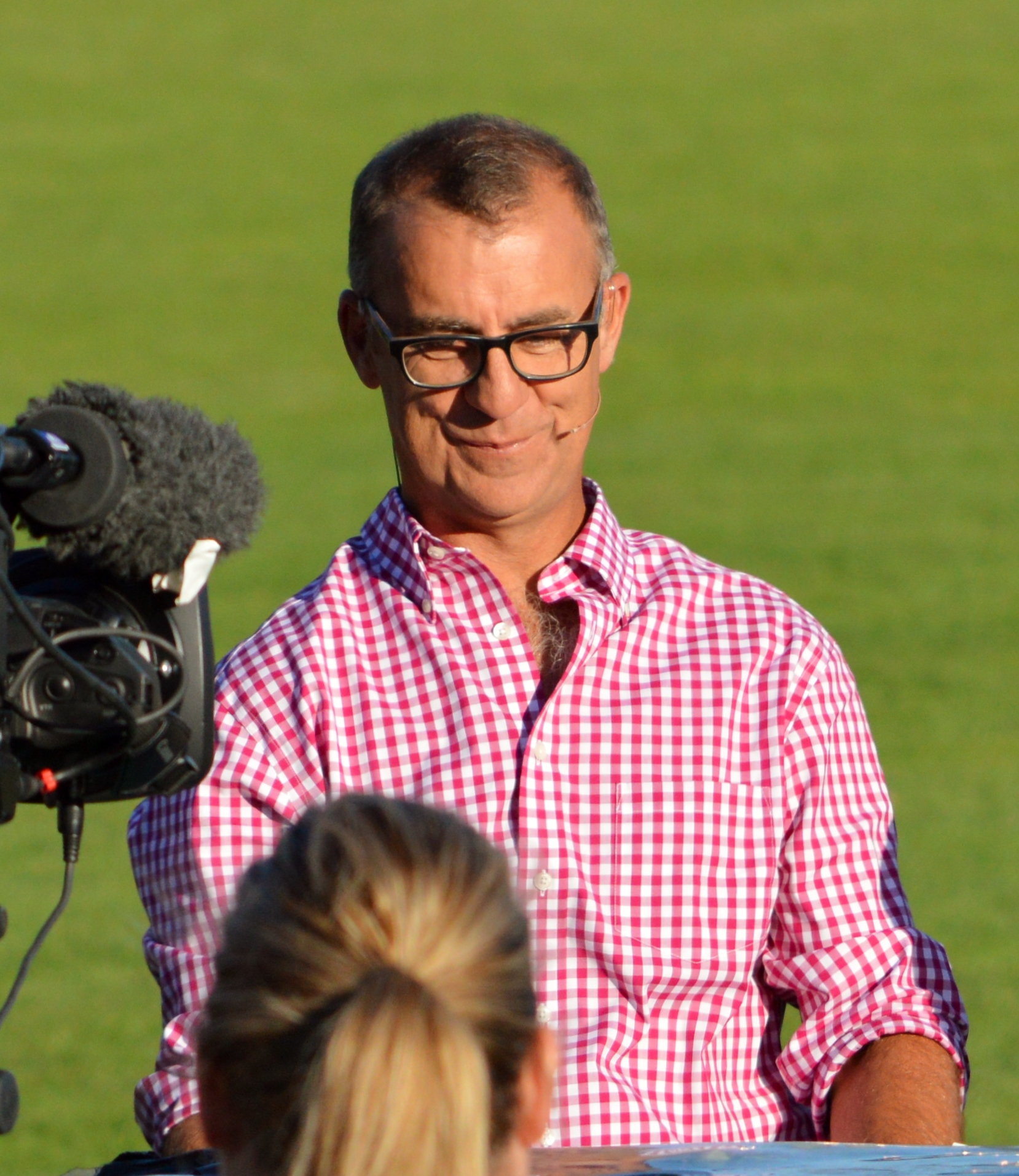
- Maher hosting a Seven Network pre-game show ahead of the inaugural AFL Women's match in February 2017
- Born: Andrew Maher; 16 July 1964 (age 62); Melbourne, Victoria, Australia
- Occupations: television and radio personality
- Years active: 1996–present
- Television: The Front Bar

Andrew Maher is an Australian sports journalist and broadcaster for the Seven Network and Melbourne sport radio station 1116 SEN. He is best known for covering both Australian rules football and the Big Bash League for the Ten television network, as well as hosting AFL review program Before the Game.

Maher was a boundary rider for the 2004, 2007, 2009 and 2011 AFL grand finals for Network Ten.

Maher hosted The Fifth Quarter (post-match show, following Saturday Night AFL games from 2004 to 2007 (with Michael Christian), and 2009 and 2011 with rotating expert commentators Malcolm Blight, Matthew Lloyd and Luke Darcy.

== Early career ==
Maher began working for weekly football newspaper 'Inside Football' as a staff writer. He progressed to be the paper's assistant editor. He then moved on to The Sunday Age, where he worked as Football Editor in the late 1990s.

== Television career ==
In 1996, he joined television production company Vuecast (now AFL Films) after it landed the contract to supply content for the Pay TV operator 'Sports AFL' as part of the Optus Vision network. As part of its Pay TV coverage of AFL football, Andrew mixed duties as host of 'One on One', the producer of its Monday night show, Football Feedback, and as the station's boundary rider on its exclusive match-day coverage. Joining Channel 7 in 2001, he produced the highly acclaimed "Talking Footy" while sharing boundary line duties on Channel 7's football coverage.

In 2002, Maher moved to Channel 10 after they, with Channel 9 and Foxtel won the rights to broadcast the AFL from Channel 7. He has multiple roles at Channel 10, working on-air and also as a part of their AFL/Sports production teams.

Maher's Channel 10 on-air contributions are as the boundary rider for their Saturday afternoon coverage, the host of their Saturday night preview show "Before the Game" as well as on the Saturday night review show, The Fifth Quarter as co-host (with Michael Christian).

Maher has also been credited with coining the phrase "spotfires" – to describe those occasions where small melees or other acts of physical aggression between opponents were breaking out during a game.

In September 2011 Fox Sports announced he hosted the association football panel show Fox Sports FC.

In 2013, Maher commentated for Network Ten's coverage of the T20 Big Bash League. In addition to the Cricket, Maher is a roving sport reporter across the board for Ten Sport, including the Formula 1; MotoGP; Golf; Tennis and Athletics (Commonwealth Games and Stawell Gift) among others. Maher continued his hosting duties for popular AFL show Before the Game on Network Ten as well, until it was axed at the end of 2013.

Since 2015, he has co-hosted The Front Bar, aired on afl.com.au and on Channel 7 along with comedians Mick Molloy and Sam Pang, seeking to take a comedic view on news from that week in the AFL community.

== AFL ==
Maher contributes on the following programmes:

- Monday's Experts, Monday review show showing highlights of the just-past round of AFL with analysis and stat's, co-hosted with former AFL footballer Jarrod Molloy
- FREE Friday's Tip-Off, where he and, SEN partner, Billy Brownless preview the round of football that is about to commence and provide information about why and who punters should tip in their tipping competitions.
