= Pacific Heat =

- Genre: Animated sitcom
- Created by: Rob Sitch; Santo Cilauro; Tom Gleisner
- Voices of: Rob Sitch; Santo Cilauro; Tom Gleisner; Rebecca Massey; Lucia Mastrantone
- Composers: William Pearson; Udi Harpaz
- Country of origin: Australia
- Original language: English
- No. of episodes: 13

Production
- Executive producer: Michael Hirsh
- Producers: Rob Sitch; Santo Cilauro; Tom Gleisner; Deb Herman
- Editors: Santo Cilauro; Phil Simon
- Running time: 20-22 minutes
- Production company: Working Dog Productions

Original release
- Network: The Comedy Channel
- Release: 27 November 2016 – 5 March 2017

Pacific Heat is an Australian adult animated sitcom co-created by Rob Sitch, Santo Cilauro, and Tom Gleisner. The series is a Working Dog production for Foxtel's The Comedy Channel. The series, which was first commissioned by Foxtel in February 2014, premiered on The Comedy Channel on 27 November 2016. It was repeated on Network Ten on Monday 8 May for special preview and Eleven on Wednesday 10 May 2017.

Netflix started streaming the series on 2 December 2016 as a "Netflix Original". However, in early November 2020, it was announced that the series will be leaving the service sometime in December as they do not own the intellectual property rights to the show.

The series left Netflix on 2 December 2020, and is currently broadcast on Foxtel and Binge

== Synopsis ==
Pacific Heat is set on the Gold Coast, Queensland, a sun-drenched paradise where sun and surf meet soaring crime rates. The police undercover special unit known as Pacific Heat tackles everyone from petty crooks to international drug cartels.

== Voice cast ==
- Rob Sitch as Special Agent Todd Sommerville
- Santo Cilauro as Agent Zac
- Tom Gleisner as the Chief
- Rebecca Massey as Special Agent Maddie Riggs
- Lucia Mastrantone as Special Agent Veronica V.J. Delane

== Episodes ==
No.	Title	Original release date
1	"A Dangerous Game"	27 November 2016
When the team goes undercover at a strip club to blow up a crystal meth ring, Maddie and VJ gain the trust of a stripper who knows the key info.
2	"Countdown to Death"	4 December 2016
The team races to track down a Chechen terrorist who's threatening to build a dirty bomb after illicitly acquiring uranium from a nuclear lab.
3	"A Family Affair"	8 December 2016
When a team member's father is kidnapped by a radical organization, Pacific Heat heads to the Southeast Asian jungle to rescue him.
4	"The Science of Death"	18 December 2016
When German terrorists break into a laboratory and threaten to release anthrax, the team hatches a sketchy plan to storm the building.
5	"The Face of Terror"	8 January 2017
Todd and Zac go undercover as security guards in Yemen to hunt for a dangerous terrorist, but they'll need Maddie and VJ's help to get out alive.
6	"Married to Murder"	15 January 2017
A journalist tags along as the team attempts to track down ecoterrorists who kidnapped the wife of a mining magnate.
7	"A Troublesome Guest"	22 January 2017
Tasked with providing security for the visiting leader of a volatile country, the team fends off various threats against his life.
8	"In the Wrong Hands"	29 January 2017
The team scrambles to find an arms dealer suspected of stealing a nuclear warhead that was being stored in a civilian warehouse.
9	"A Brush with Death"	5 February 2017
The team is charged with safeguarding a Dutch masterpiece called "Nude with Nude" at an art show. But the painting disappears anyway.
10	"A Deadly Deal"	12 February 2017
When an illegal arms dealer acquires a shipment of surface-to-air missiles, the team heads to the Burmese jungle to stop them from being sold.
11	"Extreme Turbulence"	19 February 2017
The team faces a midair crisis while serving as security for a sultan who insists on flying coach.
12	"A Deadly Grudge"	26 February 2017
Shortly after suspending the Pacific Heat agents, the chief is kidnapped by a pair of brothers who have held a grudge against him for 36 years.
13	"A Return to Evil"	5 March 2017
A string of baffling murders leads the team to suspect a serial killer. But the evidence left by a victim points them to a familiar face.

== Broadcast ==
The series premiered on Netflix in the United States, United Kingdom, Ireland, and Canada on 2 December 2016, streaming all episodes simultaneously.

== Reception ==
Pacific Heat has received generally negative reviews from critics. Review aggregator Rotten Tomatoes reported a 17% "rotten" rating. The critic consensus is yet to be reached. Metacritic reported a score of 27 out of 100 indicating "generally unfavourable reviews". The Guardian and The A.V. Club criticised the series, accusing it of imitating the art style of the American animated series Archer.

== See also ==
- Utopia
- Have You Been Paying Attention?
- List of Australian television series
