= Scumbus =

Australian film

- Written by: Ed Kavalee
- Directed by: Luke Tierney
- Starring: Ed Kavalee; Toby Truslove
- Country of origin: Australia
- Original language: English

Production
- Producers: Ed Kavalee; Christian Clark
- Cinematography: Stefan Duscio
- Editor: James Cole
- Budget: $60,000

Scumbus is a 2012 Australian comedy film written and produced by Ed Kavalee. The film stars Kavalee, Toby Truslove and Lachy Hulme. It was filmed in Melbourne, Victoria.

== Synopsis ==
Tom is an eager, ambitious policeman who takes his job seriously but his career prospects are being stymied by his squad partner (and flatmate) Red, a lazy, inept cop who is more concerned with perfecting his pick-up routines. After Red crashes their squad car into a McDonald's, their fed-up boss Brett assigns the two to the station's most unpopular job – manning the 'Scumbus', a campervan that serves as a mobile police station in the seedy part of town. Tom soon discovers the scumbus' previous occupants, a pair of surly detectives, appeared to have used the van to deal in narcotics. Eager to achieve his first bust, Tom wants to report his findings to Brett but Red is unwilling to help, more concerned with meeting a woman he has met online. Meanwhile, local dealer Adam is very worried the previous arrangements he had with the scumbus will no longer be possible.

Tom tries to report to Brett but to his surprise and disappointment, the latter is not interested and orders Tom to ignore what he found. Red arrives at the home of his new lady friend, only to have his lust cooled somewhat upon discovering that she and her husband have an open marriage and that the latter wants to watch. Unhappy about his faltering career and non-existent love life, Tom returns to the scumbus that evening to find that Red has, with the aid of Tom's credit card, turned it into a party venue, complete with a couple of attractive female guests. Tom decides to let his hair down and join the festivities.

Two detectives – arrogant Bernie (who Tom is jealous of) and Amy (who Tom has a crush on) – unexpectedly arrive and Bernie immediately declares he will report them to Brett about having a party in the van. Adam angrily gate-crashes the party, demanding his stash and money that Tom found in the van. Before things get out of hand, Brett arrives. To the surprise of Tom and Red, Brett confesses that the scumbus has always been used as a place to deal narcotics, in order to keep the local drug trade peaceful and that cops manning the van have always had fun. Tom agrees to keep the truth of the scumbus a secret in exchange for Brett not reporting the party and Tom being promoted to detective. To justify the promotion, Tom needs a bust so Red volunteers to resign from the police force and he and Adam will be 'arrested' for dealing. Tom becomes a detective whilst Red embarks on a music career.

== Cast ==
- Ed Kavalee as Tom
- Toby Truslove as Jessie 'Red' Redmond
- Lachy Hulme as Adam
- Henry Nixon as David
- Christian Clark as Bernie
- Glenn Robbins as Brett
- Tony Martin as Luke
- Peter Helliar as Andre
- Samantha Tolj as Amy
- Dave Hughes as Trent
- Kate Langbroek as Sasha
- Ryan Shelton as Dan
- Claudia Hruschka as Illana
- Julia Perrott-Clarke as Mia
- Amelia Ryan as Jane
- Ash Williams as Mooney
- Luke McGregor as Carl

== Production ==
The film was shot in Melbourne in only 11 days. Ed Kavalee, in addition to starring in the film and co-writing, co-producing and co-executive producing Scumbus, also largely self-funded the project and even directly assisted with the on-set catering. The film's budget was $60,000 and the cast agreed to work without full salaries and instead be entitled to a share in the profits.

== Reception ==
Scumbus first aired on Channel 10 on Saturday 10 November 2012.

Michael Lallo, writing in The Sydney Morning Herald, gave the film a positive review, calling it 'a comedic gem: a tightly scripted, good-cop/bad-cop story...The story hums along nicely, but it's the dialogue that stands out: a mix of rapid-fire banter and one-liners...Kavalee's movie is a win for Australian comedy.'
