= Santo, Sam and Ed's Total Football =

2013–2015 Australian TV series

- Genre: Sport; Comedy
- Presented by: Santo Cilauro; Sam Pang; Ed Kavalee
- Voices of: Michael Zappone
- Country of origin: Australia
- Original language: English
- No. of seasons: 2

Production
- Production locations: Melbourne, Australia
- Running time: 60 minutes (with advertisements)
- Production company: Working Dog Productions

Original release
- Network: Fox Sports
- Release: 14 October 2013 – 12 May 2015

Related
- Santo, Sam and Ed's Sports Fever!; Santo, Sam and Ed's Cup Fever!

Santo, Sam and Ed's Total Football is an Australian association football themed comedy television show, hosted by Santo Cilauro, Sam Pang and Ed Kavalee. The series launched in 2013, screening each Tuesday on Fox Sports from October to May, in line with the network's A-League coverage. In October 2015, it was announced that the show would not return for a third season.

The show focused on both the A-League and a range of global football leagues, and included a variety of segments and interviews throughout each episode.

In September 2016, the show returned as a podcast from ABC. In May 2017, video versions of the podcast began airing on ABC iview, and became the first podcast on that platform. As part of the podcast, Cup Fever! covered the 2018 FIFA World Cup.

== Hosts ==
- Santo Cilauro
- Sam Pang
- Ed Kavalee

== Regular contributors ==
- David Davutovic
- Neroli Meadows
- Rob Sitch
- Michael Zappone

== See also ==
- Santo, Sam and Ed's Cup Fever!
- Santo, Sam and Ed's Sports Fever!
