= Clifton Hill Primary School =

Historic site in Victoria, Australia

Location
- 185 Gold Street, Clifton Hill, Victoria, Australia
- 37.79237°S 144.98914°E

Information
- Former name: Gold Street State School
- School type: Public
- Motto: Striving for Excellence
- Established: 1874
- Principal: Megan Smith
- Years offered: Prep – Year 6
- Enrollment: 681 (2023)
- Website: Official site

Clifton Hill Primary School is a heritage-listed public co-educational primary school located in the Melbourne suburb of Clifton Hill, Victoria, Australia. It is administered by the Victorian Department of Education, with an enrolment of 681 students and a teaching staff of 56, as of 2023. The school serves students from Prep to Year 6. It was added to the Victorian Heritage Register on 20 August 1982 for its historical and architectural significance to the state of Victoria.

== History ==
At the end of 1873, the minister of education at the time accepted a tender for the erection of a state school on Gold Street. The school was designed by William Henry Ellerker and was originally going to be built with a capacity of 500 students in mind, however, Ellerker's design for a capacity of 1,000 students was used instead.

It opened in 1874 under the name Gold Street State School. By August of the very same year, the school had a student enrolment of 1,289 but only had an average attendance of 660. This low attendance was believed to be due to the school's recent opening and that the school's average attendance would increase over time. In 1876, the school had an enrolment of 1,091 students with an average attendance of 661. One year later, in 1877, the student enrolment was 1,220 with an average attendance of 660 and by 1878 the student enrolment was 1,400 with an average attendance 823. The average attendance exceeded 960 by the end of 1883.

On 26 February 1877, a six-year-old student (James West) was beaten by his classmates just outside the school; he died from his injuries a few weeks later. A police investigation ensued, with an autopsy of the body being conducted. The conduct of the headmaster's response surrounding the matter was also examined. By June 1877, the perpetrator was not yet identified, despite there being multiple witnesses. The investigation was described as "bungled" with the police taking limited notice of the incident and the school dismissing the matter. It was feared that the case would be forgotten, and it was suggested that it would be a great misfortune if the Education Department did not take further action to identify the culprit.

In 1878, a student climbed the school building and was unable to come down; he was ultimately saved but received the cane for endangering his life.

The opening of a post office in Clifton Hill was celebrated with a ball and supper at the school in 1883.

== Demographics ==
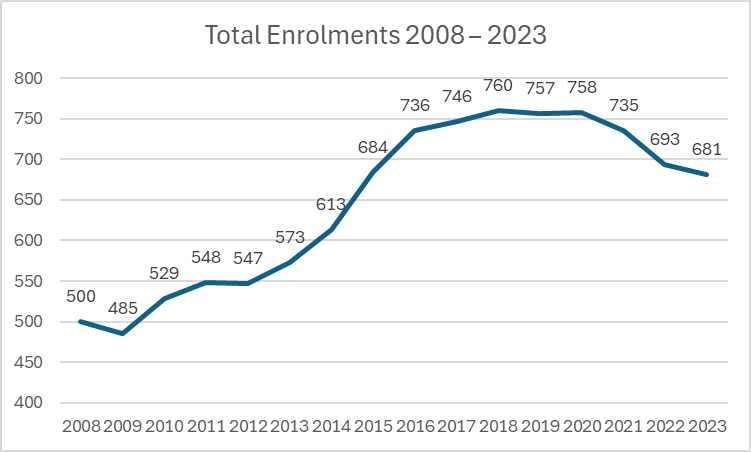
Clifton Hill Primary School Enrolment Data from 2008 to 2023

In 2021, the school had a student enrolment of 735 with 63 teachers (50.2 full-time equivalent) and 13 non-teaching staff (7.3 full-time equivalent). Female enrolments consisted of 380 students and Male enrolments consisted of 355 students; Indigenous enrolments accounted for a total of 1% and 26% of students had a language background other than English.

In 2022, the school had a student enrolment of 693 with 59 teachers (47 full-time equivalent) and 15 non-teaching staff (8.4 full-time equivalent). Female enrolments consisted of 362 students and Male enrolments consisted of 331 students; Indigenous enrolments accounted for a total of 1% and 27% of students had a language background other than English.

In 2023, the school had a student enrolment of 681 with 56 teachers (47 full-time equivalent) and 14 non-teaching staff (7.6 full-time equivalent). Female enrolments consisted of 361 students and Male enrolments consisted of 320 students; Indigenous enrolments accounted for a total of 1% and 25% of students had a language background other than English.

== Notable alumni ==
- Roy Allen, Australian rules football player
- Eric Cock, Australian rules football player
- Lidia Thorpe, politician
- Sam Pang, entertainment personality

== See also ==
- Education in Victoria
- List of government schools in Victoria, Australia
