= Pictures of You (TV series) =

- Genre: talk show
- Presented by: Brian Nankervis
- Opening theme: Pictures of You
- Country of origin: Australia
- Original language: English
- No. of seasons: 1
- No. of episodes: 16

Production
- Production company: Working Dog Productions

Original release
- Network: Seven Network
- Release: 27 March 2012 – 2012

Pictures of You is an Australian talk show program that aired on the Seven Network on 27 March 2012. It was hosted by Brian Nankervis in front of a studio audience and was produced by Working Dog Productions. This interview-style series features well-known personalities who share their old photos, along with personal stories from their formative years.

In March 2013, the series was cancelled after not being renewed for a second season.

Personalities who appeared on the show included Anh Do, Cal Wilson, Carl Barron, Frank Woodley, Denise Scott, Julia Morris, Peter Helliar, Ross Noble, Russell Gilbert and Shane Jacobson.
