= Tory Mussett =

Australian actress

- Born: Australia
- Other name: Victoria Mussett
- Occupation: Actor
- Years active: 1998–2013

Tory Mussett is an Australian film and television actress.

== Career ==
Her first television appearance was in an episode of the detective drama Murder Call. She later appeared in an episode of Flat Chat, and had a larger role in Crash Palace.

Mussett had small parts both in The Matrix Reloaded (2003) as the Beautiful Woman at Le Vrai and in Peter Pan (2003) as one of the mermaids. This was followed by a more substantial role playing Jessica in the 2005 film Boogeyman. In 2006, she starred in the third episode of the TV miniseries Nightmares and Dreamscapes: From the Stories of Stephen King where she played the girlfriend of a private detective played by William H. Macy.

In 2007 she starred as Julie in WWE Films production of The Condemned starring Stone Cold Steve Austin. Tory was credited under the name 'Victoria Mussett', appearing as a minor character in the Australian comedy show 30 Seconds in 2009, on The Comedy Channel. Tory played Sally in U.S. show Mistresses in 2013 on the ABC.

== Filmography ==
=== Film ===
Year	Title	Role	Type
1999	Secret Men's Business	Kim	TV movie
2000	Mission: Impossible 2	Flamenco Guest	Feature film
2003	The Matrix Reloaded	Beautiful Woman at Le Vrai	Feature film
2003	Peter Pan	Mermaid	Feature film
2005	Boogeyman	Jessica	Feature film
2006	Safety in Numbers	Sarah	Feature film
2007	The Condemned	Julie	Feature film
2008	Soft Cop	Femme Fatale	Short film

=== Television ===
Year	Title	Role	Type
1998	Murder Call	Melissa Hindwood	TV series, season 2, episode 4: "Fatal Charm"
2001	Flat Chat		TV series, season 1, episode 8: "Dark and Stormy Night"
2001-02	Crash Palace	Inez del Rey	TV series, 61 episodes
2006	Nightmares and Dreamscapes: From the Stories of Stephen King	Arlene 'Candy' Cain / Pool Girl	TV miniseries, episode 3: "Umney's Last Case"
2007	Stupid, Stupid Man	Leanne	TV series, season 2, episode 1: "Appearances are Everything"
2009	30 Seconds	Anna	TV series, season 1, episode 2: "Be the Tool"
2009	East West 101	Karen Keeda	TV series, season 2, episode 4: "Ice in the Veins"
2013	Mistresses	Sally	TV series, 4 episodes

== Personal life ==
Tory dated actor Toby Truslove for seven years, who she starred with in Crash Palace.

She currently works as a photographer based in Byron Bay, New South Wales and on the Gold Coast, Queensland.
