= Santo, Sam and Ed's Sports Fever! =

2012 Australian sports TV series

- Genre: Sport; Comedy
- Presented by: Santo Cilauro; Sam Pang; Ed Kavalee
- Country of origin: Australia
- Original language: English
- No. of seasons: 1
- No. of episodes: 10

Production
- Production locations: Melbourne, Australia
- Running time: 60 minutes
- Production company: Working Dog Productions

Original release
- Network: Seven Network; 7mate
- Release: 30 January – 2 April 2012

Related
- Santo, Sam and Ed's Cup Fever!; Santo, Sam and Ed's Total Football

Santo, Sam and Ed's Sports Fever! is an Australian sports themed comedy television show hosted by Santo Cilauro, Sam Pang and Ed Kavalee. It screened from 30 January to 2 April 2012. It screened live-to-air on 7mate on Monday nights at 8:30 pm and was later replayed the same night on Seven at 11:30 pm.

Santo, Sam and Ed's Sports Fever! was produced by Working Dog Productions, and was filmed in Melbourne. It was a spin-off from Santo, Sam and Ed's Cup Fever!, an association football themed comedy television show which screened on SBS during the duration of the 2010 FIFA World Cup. It was succeeded by Santo, Sam and Ed's Total Football on Fox Sports in 2013, another association football based show.

== See also ==
- Santo, Sam and Ed's Cup Fever!
- Santo, Sam and Ed's Total Football
