= Glenn Robbins =

Australian actor and comedian (b.1957)

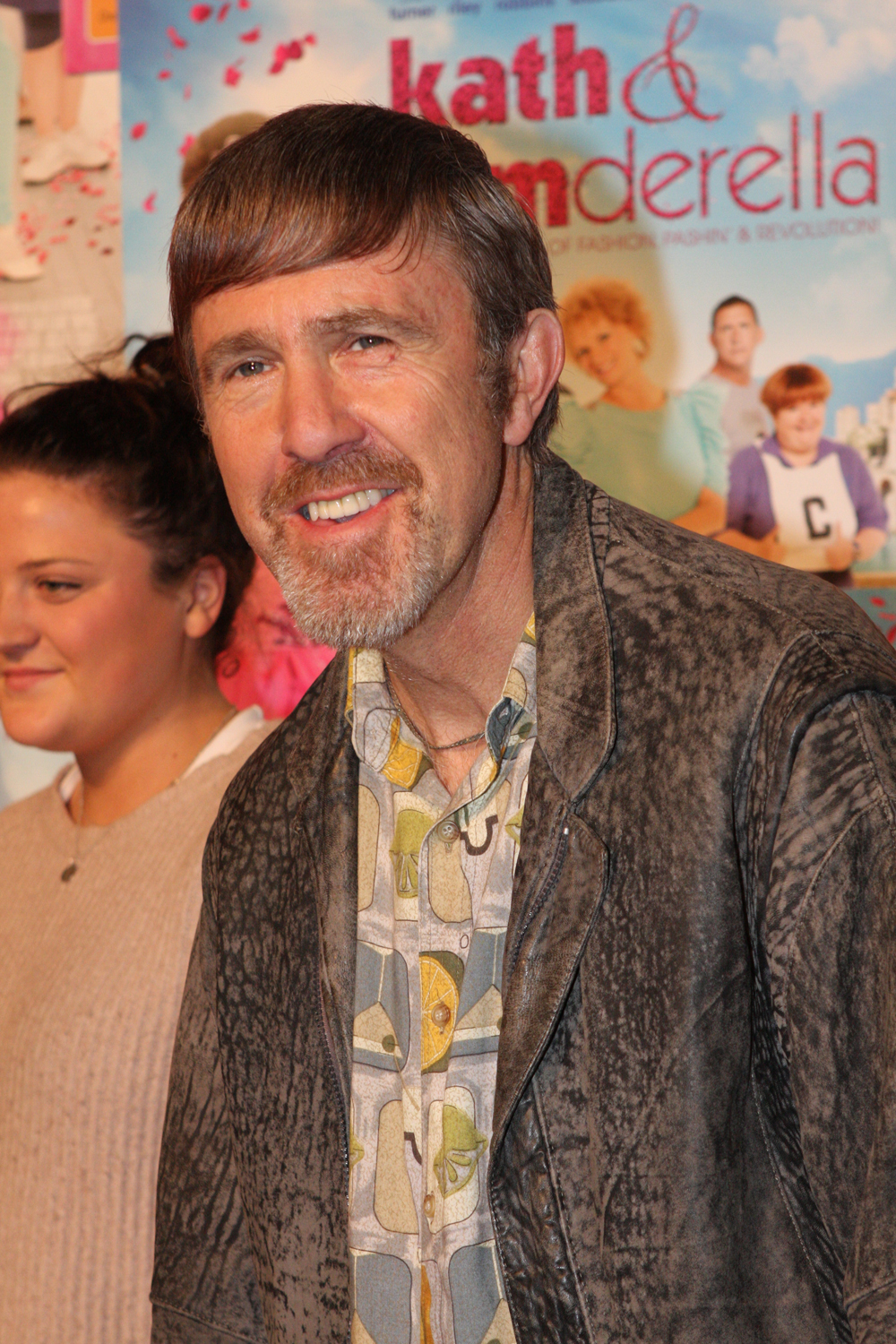
- Robbins in character as Kel Knight at Kath & Kimderella film premiere, August 2012
- Born: Glenn Maxwell Robbins; 30 December 1957 (age 68); Melbourne, Victoria, Australia
- Occupations: Comedian; writer; actor; television and radio presenter
- Years active: 1984–present
- Television: All Aussie Adventures; The Comedy Company; Fast Forward; Kath & Kim; The Panel
- Spouse: Selina Robbins

Glenn Maxwell Robbins (born 30 December 1957) is an Australian comedian, writer, actor, television and radio presenter. He is best known for The Comedy Company, portraying Kel Knight in Kath & Kim and adventurer Russell Coight in All Aussie Adventures. Robbins has appeared on The Panel, Thank God You're Here and Have You Been Paying Attention?.

== Early life ==
Robbins attended Strathmore High School and graduated in 1975. He later studied drama and media at the Melbourne State College and graduated with a Bachelor of Education degree in 1979. He first moved into performing in 1981.

== Career ==
=== Television ===
Robbins began his acting career in 1984, appearing in two episodes of Prisoner and one episode of Special Squad. In 1985 he appeared on the sketch show The Eleventh Hour. He shot to fame in 1988 when he starred in another sketch show, The Comedy Company, in which one of his characters, "Uncle Arthur", became very popular. In 1991 he joined the team of Fast Forward for two seasons. Other sketch shows in which he has appeared include Full Frontal (1993), Jimeoin (1994–95) and Something Stupid (1998).

In 1998, Robbins became a panellist on the weekly television show The Panel. This aired on Network Ten. The show lasted eight seasons, going into hiatus in 2005.

Robbins played Australian adventurer Russell Coight in All Aussie Adventures from 2001 until 2002 and again in 2018 on Network Ten, as well as the 2004 telemovie.

From 2002, he played the role of Kel Knight in the television comedy series Kath & Kim. He also appeared in the Da Kath & Kim Code telemovie in 2005. The series ended in 2007. In 2022, Robbins reprised the role of Kel for a special celebrating the series, it aired on channel 7 with new skits and unseen footage.

In 2006, Robbins appeared in two episodes of Network Ten's Thank God You're Here. He is executive producer of the Network 10 sketch comedy show The Ronnie Johns Half Hour. In 2008, he launched a new game show on the Seven Network entitled Out of the Question. In 2011 he was the guest on the fourth episode of the comedy program The Joy of Sets on the Nine Network.

From 2013, Robbins has appeared in the ABC comedy series Upper Middle Bogan as Wayne Wheeler, and has a semi-regular guest spot on Have You Been Paying Attention?.

=== Film ===
In 2001, Robbins played the role of Pete O'May in the award-winning Australian film Lantana. In 2006 he co-starred with Mick Molloy in the comedy feature BoyTown as an '80s pop-star called "Benny G.". In 2011 he appeared in the comedy Scumbus. In 2012 he reprised his role of Kel Knight in the movie Kath & Kimderella.

=== Radio ===
Robbins has a weekly one-hour radio segment on Melbourne radio station 3AW as part of The Weekend Break with Grubby and Dee Dee Sunday edition.

== Awards ==
Robbins has been nominated at the Logies several times. He was nominated for Most Popular Actor in 2003 and 2004 for his role in Kath & Kim and again nominated in 2005 for his role in the telemovie Da Kath & Kim Code.

== Personal life ==
The third son of Arthur and Gwen, Robbins is married to Selina, who is a nurse, and currently lives in Melbourne.

== Filmography ==
=== Film ===
Year	Title	Role	Notes
1987	The Bit Part	Man #2	
1988	Rikky and Pete	Newspaper Foreman	
1988	Evil Angels	Young Father	
2001	Lantana	Pete O'May	
2006	The Deal	Mike	Short film
2006	BoyTown	Benny G	
2012	Kath & Kimderella	Kel Knight	
2012	Scumbus	Brett Chester	

=== Television ===
Year	Title	Role	Notes
1984	Prisoner	Detective / Husband	2 episodes
1985	A Thousand Skies	Hudson Fysh	Miniseries
1985	The Eleventh Hour	Various roles	also writer
1985	Special Squad		1 episode: "A Wild Oat"
1985	The Video Comedy Show	Himself	
1986	The Flying Doctors	Mac	1 episode: "Acceptance"
1986	While You're Down There	Various characters	also writer (5 episodes)
1987	Theatre Sports	Himself	
1988–90	The Comedy Company	Uncle Arthur / Gary Dare / Darren (1988–89)	also writer
1990	Tonight Live with Steve Vizard	Himself	also writer
1991–92	Fast Forward	Various characters	also writer, season 3–4 (37 episodes)
1991	Turn It Up	Bob	Unscreened pilot
1993	Full Frontal	Guest performer	7 episodes, also writer 1993–95 (20 episodes)
1993	A Royal Commission Into the Australian Economy	Policeman / President George Bush (Retired)	Television film
1993	The Making of Nothing	Barry Mappin	Television film, also writer
1994	Standing on the Road	Himself	Television documentary, also writer, producer
1994	Frontline	Himself	1 episode: "Add Sex and Stir"
1994–95	Jimeoin	Various characters	also writer
1996	Eric	Various characters	Television film
1997–2001	Headliners	—N/a	co-creator, director, creative producer
1998	The Russell Gilbert Show	Himself	1 episode: "Episode 1.1", also writer, creative consultant
1998	Something Stupid	Various characters	also writer
1998–2007	The Panel	Himself	183 episodes, also co-producer
1999	The Mick Molloy Show	Himself	1 episode: "Episode 1.5"
1999	The Micallef P(r)ogram(me)	Himself	1 episode: "Episode 2.2"
2001–02, 2018	All Aussie Adventures	Russell Coight	
2001, 2006, 2009	Rove	Himself / Russell Coight	3 episodes
2002–04, 2007	Kath & Kim	Kel Knight	
2003	Fast Forward: One More Round	Himself / Various characters	Television special
2004	Saturday Night Darren and Brose	Himself	1 episode: "Episode 1.1"
2004	Good Morning Australia	Himself	1 episode
2004	Russell Coight's Celebrity Challenge	Russell Coight	Television film, also creative consultant, casting director
2005	Australia Unites: Reach Out to Asia	Himself	Telethon
2005–06	The Ronnie Johns Half Hour	—N/a	executive producer
2005	Da Kath & Kim Code	Kel Knight	Television film
2006, 2024	Thank God You're Here	Himself / Russell Coight	2 episodes, creative consultant (2006–09), 1 episode, cameo
2006	The Crocodile Hunter: A Tribute to Steve Irwin	Himself / Russell Coight (uncredited)	Television documentary
2006	Australian Idol	Himself	Top 7 Results Show
2006–07	Dancing with the Stars	Himself / Kel Knight / Himself - audience member	3 episodes
2007	The Nation	Himself	1 Episode: "Episode 9"
2008	Out of the Question	Host	also producer
2010	Santo, Sam and Ed's Cup Fever!	Himself	1 episode: "Episode 21"
2013	Twentysomething	Jess's Dad	1 episode: "Tricks of the Trade"
2014	Shaun Micallef's Mad as Hell	ABC Sports Correspondent (uncredited)	1 episode: "Episode 3.10"
2015	Open Slather	Various characters	also creative consultant, writer (5 episodes)
2015	Dirty Laundry Live	Young Lawrence Mooney	1 episode: "Episode 3.12"
2013–16	Upper Middle Bogan	Wayne Wheeler	
2013–Present	Have You Been Paying Attention?	Himself	29 episodes
2015	Have You Been Paying Attention?	Russell Coight	Guest Quiz Master
2017	True Story with Hamish & Andy	Harold	1 episode: "Emidio"
2019	Have You Been Paying Attention? New Zealand	Himself	2 episodes
2021	I'm a Celebrity...Get Me Out of Here!	Russell Coight	1 episode
2021	Fisk	Dean	3 episodes
2026	Glenn & Mick's Celebrity Intervention	himself	8 episodes

== Bibliography ==
=== Contributor ===
- Robbins, Glenn (2007). "Contributor". Laugh Even Louder!. By Camp Quality. Gosford, New South Wales: Scholastic Australia Pty Limited. ISBN 978-1-74169-022-4.
