= Five in a Row (1989 song) =

Single by The D-Generation

from the album The Satanic Sketches
- B-side: "Pissweak Quiz Show Sketch"
- Released: November 1989
- Genre: Comedy
- Label: Mushroom
- Songwriters: Santo Cilauro, Tony Martin, Rob Sitch, Tom Gleisner

The D-Generation singles chronology
"Degeneration" (1987)	"Five in a Row" (1989)	"Five More in a Row" (1990)

"Five in a Row" was a 1989 single by Australian comedy team, The D-Generation. It was released in November 1989 and reached a peak position of number 12 on the ARIA Singles Chart. Its lyrics were co-written by The D-Generation members, Santo Cilauro, Tony Martin, Rob Sitch, and Tom Gleisner, with its music written and produced by Colin Setches and John Grant.

The song and its accompanying music video feature Rob Sitch as the "23FM" radio disc jockey and parodied five Australian musicians: John Farnham (played in the video by Sitch – Farnham himself appeared briefly in the video too), Jimmy Barnes (played by Cilauro), Kylie Minogue (played by Jane Kennedy), Little River Band (played by Gleisner and Cilauro), and James Reyne (played by John Harrison). D-Generation member Tony Martin can be seen making a background appearance in the video.

On the recording, the voice of Farnham was provided by a pre-fame Jack Jones, the voice of Barnes was imitated by John Brown, all of LRB's voices were done by Setches, with Kennedy impersonating Minogue, and Harrison singing Reyne's parts. Drums were played by Angus Burchall (from Farnham's band), with bass by Roger McLachlan (LRB, Pyramid, Farnham), guitars by Thomas, and all keyboards, programming and arrangements done by Grant. The song was recorded at AAV Studio 1, South Melbourne, with engineering, mixing and co-production provided by Ross Cockle.

The D-Generation followed "Five in a Row" with the similarly themed single "Five More in a Row" (1990) which parodied another five Australian musical acts.

== Track listing ==
1. "Five in a Row"
2. "Pissweak Quiz Show Sketch"

== Charts ==
Chart (1989/1990)	Peak position
Australia (ARIA)	12

== Certification ==
Region	Certification	Certified units/sales
Australia (ARIA)	Gold	35,000^{^}
^{^} Shipments figures based on certification alone.
