= Johnny Swank =

Johnny Swank was the name of a radio comedy serial produced by Working Dog Productions in 1996 for Australia's Austereo radio network. The show was created by members of The D-Generation. The serial was about a secret agent named Johnny Swank (voiced by Rob Sitch) and his sidekick K2 (voiced by Santo Cilauro).

The show had a different theme song for each day of the week:

Monday

When he walks, you can hear the ladies swoon (Johnny Swank! Johnny Swank!)
He's the man who will save the world from doom (Johnny Swank! Johnny Swank!)
His aim is true, he's got more frequent-flyer points than you,
He drives a '95 Daewoo ("the big one...")
Johnny Swank! Johnny Swank! Johnny Swank!

Tuesday

When he walks, all the people stop and stare (Johnny Swank! Johnny Swank!)
He's fastidious, when it comes to underwear (Johnny Swank! Johnny Swank!)
He is not afraid of death, he's a five-star gourmet chef,
He is also somewhat deaf ("what was that?")
Johnny Swank! Johnny Swank! Johnny Swank!

Wednesday

He's the man, he's the man for you and me (Johnny Swank! Johnny Swank!)
He's the man, who makes the ladies sing off-key (Johnny Swank! Johnny Swank!)
He's the man we all adore, with chicks he'll always score,
His gun safety is poor ("uh, sorry!")
Johnny Swank! Johnny Swank! Johnny Swank!

Thursday

When he walks, you can tell he's one cool cat (Johnny Swank! Johnny Swank!)
With his gun and his ... cravat (Johnny Swank! Johnny Swank!)
He knows no fear, he won Lotto last year,
He chucks after just one beer!
Johnny Swank! Johnny Swank! Johnny Swank!

Friday

He's the spy, he's the spy who's suave and brave (Johnny Swank! Johnny Swank!)
He's the spy who wears too much aftershave (Johnny Swank! Johnny Swank!)
He is on the best-dressed list, he's a pilot and linguist,
He is prone to getting pissed!
Johnny Swank! Johnny Swank! Johnny Swank!
