= Hughesy, Ed & Erin =

Australian radio comedy show

- Genre: Comedy
- Running time: 180 minutes (6:00 am – 9:00 am)
- Country of origin: Australia
- Language(s): English
- Home station: 2Day FM
- Starring: Ed Kavalee; Dave Hughes; Erin Molan
- Produced by: Mindy Thomas
- Executive producer(s): Violet Merhi Mcfadyen
- Recording studio: Sydney
- Original release: 18 January 2021 – 7 August 2024
- Audio format: Stereophonic sound
- Website: www.hit.com.au/2day

Hughesy, Ed and Erin was an Australian breakfast radio show on 2Day FM. The show is hosted by Dave Hughes, Ed Kavalee and Erin Molan. A highlights package of the show, Hughesy, Ed & Erin's Happy Hour aired weeknights from 6 pm to 7 pm.

The show commenced on Monday, 18 January 2021.

A daily podcast featuring the best bits from each show is available on LiSTNR as is the podcast for all Hit Network breakfast shows in Australia.

== History ==
In November 2020, Southern Cross Austereo announced that Dave Hughes, Ed Kavalee and Erin Molan would replace Jamie Angel's Music for Breakfast to host Hughesy, Ed and Erin Molan from Monday, 18 January 2021. A one-hour highlights package will air nationally at 6 pm across the Hit Network.

In December 2021, Jack Laurence resigned as anchor of the show.

In August 2024, Southern Cross Austereo announced that the show had been axed with 2Day FM taking a new direction. The last show aired on Wednesday 7 August. Jimmy & Nath will host breakfast for the remainder of the year.
