= Crash Palace =

Australian tv soap opera (2001–2002)

- Starring: Kristy Wright; Tory Mussett; Toby Truslove; Victoria Hill; Jenni Baird
- Countries of origin: Australia; United Kingdom
- Original language: English
- No. of seasons: 1
- No. of episodes: 65

Production
- Running time: 25 minutes

Original release
- Network: Sky One
- Release: 10 October 2001 – 23 May 2002

Crash Palace is an Australian television soap opera. The series ran for 65 half-hour episodes screening on subscription television channel Fox8. It also aired in the UK and Ireland on Sky1.

Revolving around The Royal, a backpacker hostel in Kings Cross, the show followed the trials and tribulations on a group of young travellers from all around the world.

== Cast ==
- Lisa Bailey as Isabella Rocha, Brazilian co-owner of the hostel
- Jenni Baird as Chris Sandford
- Amelia Barrett as Wendy Greenham, from America
- Daniel Billet as Ricky Deitz, from America
- Dieter Brummer as Dave Collins, local drifter, killed off in a diving accident in an early episode
- Warren Derosa as John Dickson, from London
- Julian Garner as Klaus Muller, from Germany
- Jessica Gower as Miranda Watts, from New Zealand
- Victoria Hill as Carla Vieri, lesbian
- Simone McAullay as Angie McIntyre, from Scotland
- Tim McGunn as George Jackson, Isabella's husband
- Tory Mussett as Inez del Rey, from Buenos Aires
- Toby Truslove as Bryan Rossiter, from Essex
- Stephanie Waring as Tina Clark, from Manchester
- Kristy Wright as Suze Collins, who shares a past with Dave
- Tandi Wright as Penny Watts, Miranda's mother
- Masa Yamaguchi as Jun Nanam
- Ross Newton as Charlie
- John Atkinson as Noddy
