= Five More in a Row =

Single by The D-Generation

from the album The Breakfast Tapes (1988-90)
- B-side: "Pissweak Courtroom Sketch"
- Released: September 1990
- Genre: Comedy
- Label: Mushroom
- Songwriters: Santo Cilauro, Tony Martin, Rob Sitch, Tom Gleisner

The D-Generation singles chronology
"Five in a Row" (1989)	"Five More in a Row" (1990)

"Five More in a Row" is a 1990 single by Australian comedy team, The D-Generation, recorded and released as the follow-up to their similarly-themed single "Five in a Row" the previous year.

"Five More in a Row" was co-written by The D-Generation members, Santo Cilauro, Tony Martin, Rob Sitch, and Tom Gleisner. with music written and produced by Colin Setches and John Grant. The song was released in September 1990 and reached a peak position of number 37 on the ARIA Singles Chart (whereas "Five in a Row" had peaked at #12 in 1989).

Like "Five in a Row", the "Five More in a Row" song and its accompanying music video featured Rob Sitch as the "23FM" radio disc jockey and parodied five Australian music acts. They were: Max Q (Jason Stephens playing Michael Hutchence), Dragon (Mick Molloy playing Marc Hunter), Daryl Braithwaite (played by Sitch), Kate Ceberano (played by Jane Kennedy), and Midnight Oil (Sitch playing Peter Garrett). The real Daryl Braithwaite makes a cameo appearance in the video (as the real John Farnham had done in the "Five in a Row" video) and D-Generation members Santo Cilauro, Tom Gleisner, and John Harrison can be seen in the video.

== Track listing ==
1. "Five More in a Row"
2. "Pissweak Courtroom Sketch"

== Charts ==
Chart (1990)	Peak position
Australia (ARIA)	37
