= Cup Fever! =

Australian TV series

- Created by: Working Dog Productions
- Starring: Santo Cilauro; Sam Pang; Ed Kavalee
- Country of origin: Australia
- No. of seasons: 1
- No. of episodes: 26

Production
- Running time: 30 minutes per episode including commercials
- Production company: Working Dog Productions

Original release
- Network: SBS TV
- Release: 11 June – 11 July 2010

Related
- Santo, Sam and Ed's Sports Fever!; Santo, Sam and Ed's Total Football

Cup Fever! is an association football themed comedy television show in Australia on SBS. The nightly panel-style show was produced by Working Dog Productions and aired for the duration of the 2010 FIFA World Cup. The show was hosted by Santo Cilauro, Sam Pang and Ed Kavalee, with Rob Sitch making several guest appearances. Segments include Cup Update (a discussion of the previous day's World Cup matches), an interview with a special guest and various comedy sketches.

Socceroos midfielder Mark Bresciano featured in his own diary segment. He also announced that he had signed for Serie A club Lazio during an interview on the show. Other regular segments included 'Take on my Nuts', 'Not Even Close' and 'The Rivaldo Award' which poked fun at World Cup proceedings and football in general. The show also had segments filmed at the World Cup by correspondent Tony Wilson.

The show was well received by viewers and has a thriving Facebook community. Due to the show's popularity, fans are pushing for the show to continue in some form since completion of the 2010 FIFA World Cup. The spin-off show Santo, Sam and Ed's Sports Fever! was picked up by the Seven Network and began airing from January 2012.

The show was recorded in a podcast format (as part of Total Football) for the 2018 FIFA World Cup, with video versions streamed on ABC iview.

On 2 April 2026, SBS announced the return of Cup Fever! for the 2026 FIFA World Cup.

== Special guests ==
Each show featured a special guest, often in the form of former footballers, current footballers, entertainers and on one occasion, ALP senator Stephen Conroy. A notable appearance was made by trumpeter James Morrison who played a custom-made Vuvuzelaphone.

=== Impersonations ===
In many episodes, the show did live crosses to special guests, who were actually members of the panel dressed up. Some of the more popular impersonations were Santo impersonating Argentinian coach and football hero Diego Maradona (during which his fake moustache regularly fell off his face), Ed impersonating the fashion-conscious German coach Joachim Löw, and Ed and Rob Sitch pretending to be New Zealand sports commentators hosting "Kiwi TV", in which they would fit in as many popular New Zealand references as possible.

The most popular impersonation was Sam doing North Korean leader Kim Jong-il, in which he would suggest that North Korea had won the cup as well as playing a Casio keyboard. In one episode, he claimed to have written the song "Walking on Sunshine". In another, he predicted North Korea would win a game against Portugal 7–0. They subsequently lost 0–7. He would also make constant references to his oversized glasses by asking Ed if he liked big glasses or a big spectacle.

== Props ==
A number of props were regularly featured in the program. Some of these props included a packet of Argentinian "Tac-Tics" shaped like Tic-Tacs which weren't very good, a Champagne bottle of "French Campaign" which was said to taste flat, a Krispy Kreme styled box of "Diego Maradonuts", a pack of "Wayne Rooney Disappointmints" which tasted bitter, a Red Bull can labelled "Red Card" and a joke book supposedly released by solemn Japanese coach Takeshi Okada.

== Regular segments ==
Many segments were featured regularly, often based on the previous day's play, including:

=== Cupdate ===
After the initial introductions of the panel, Cupdate was an overview of the games played since the last episode. Originally titled "Cup Update" and accompanied by an impressive graphics display, Sam changed it to "Cupdate" in the last few episodes as he felt the segment was getting stale and needed sprucing up. The result was an even more impressive graphics display.

=== The Rivaldo Award ===
The panel played clips of players taking obvious fake dives from the games played overnight. The segment was named in honour of Brazilian player Rivaldo Vítor Borba Ferreira and the segment began with footage of Rivaldo having a football hit his leg, in which he reacted by clutching his face and falling to the ground.

=== Bresciano's Cup Diary ===
The most popular segment involved Australia player Mark Bresciano recalling the day's events, up until Australia were knocked out of the tournament. However, his thoughts often centred on meals and walks to the lake.

=== Not Even Close ===
The panel wore thick-lensed glasses and reviewed shots at goal which did not make it close to the net.

=== Take on My Nuts ===
The panel highlighted examples of players attempting to block the ball who made no effort to protect their groins from the impact.

=== Bin Night ===
On Sunday nights, the panel revealed jokes which had been previously deemed not funny enough to make it to air. Such jokes were read and literally put in a bin. One controversial joke involved Sam showing footage of a Japanese spectator with an elongated face singing the Japanese national anthem, with Sam's tag being "I know the Japanese Anthem isn't very good, but why the long face?".

A puppet of Argentinian player Lionel Messi named "Messi Knee" (a parody of Hey Hey It's Saturday puppet Dickie Knee) also made regular appearance during the segment to the panel's chagrin.

=== Commentator's Curse ===
The panel also enjoyed highlighting the "Commentator's Curse", where a commentator would make a positive suggestion about a player's skill, and the player would immediately blunder. A popular commentator's curse incident highlighted was where the commentator stated, "Now, here comes Arjen Robben, look at the speed at which he goes at," before subsequently toe poking it to the opposition.

== See also ==
- Santo, Sam and Ed's Sports Fever!
- Santo, Sam and Ed's Total Football
