= Toby Truslove =

Australian film, theatre and television actor

- Born: Perth, Australia
- Occupation: Actor
- Years active: 2001–present
- Spouse: Michala Banas (m. 29 April 2019)

Toby Truslove is an Australian film, theatre and television actor.

== Early life ==
Truslove grew up in Perth, Western Australia, and holidayed on Rottnest Island with his family every summer. His father, Mike, went to the seminary for three years with the idea of becoming a priest, before he met his wife, Georgia, while he was singing in a folk band. They got married and moved to London for a few years, before moving back to Perth, where Truslove was born. He grew up living next door to his paternal grandparents, Eileen and Gary.

== Career ==
In 2001, Truslove appeared on the television drama series Crash Palace as Bryan Rossiter. He has since made guest appearances on Australian TV series including All Saints, McLeod's Daughters, The Strip, Thank God You're Here and The Librarians.

In 2011 he starred in two ABC TV comedy series Laid and Outland. He also appears in the comedy feature Scumbus. In 2012 he was the lead in The Strange Calls. Onstage he has played Sam in the Belvoir St. Theatre's 2012 production of Strange Interlude, as well as Victor Prynne in Noël Coward's play Private Lives – another Belvoir production.

Truslove was one of the team captains on Channel 7's Slide Show and went on to star in the comedy TV series Utopia and U.S. series La Brea.

Truslove co-hosted the 2014 New Year's Eve broadcast for the ABC with Julia Zemiro.

In 2024, Truslove would return for the second series of Scrublands.

Truslove also works as a host and MC in the corporate arena. He has been the co-host of Splendour In The Grass music festival and has hosted nationwide events for the Canadian Tourism Commission.

== Personal life ==
Truslove cites his mother as the inspiration for his career in acting. He does not consider himself to be religious, despite having participated in the Catholic Church as a child.

Truslove dated actress Tory Mussett for seven years. He went on to date comedian Celia Pacquola from 2008 to 2013. They broke up due to the strain of a long-distance relationship. He then dated actress Michala Banas, whom he had met many years earlier. After three years together, they eloped in Central Park on 29 April 2019, while on holiday in New York.

Truslove's father Mike died in 2014, within a year of being diagnosed with a brain tumour.

== Filmography ==
=== Film ===
Year	Title	Role	Type
2003	The Pact	Attendant	Feature film
2008	Soft Cop	Police Officer	Short film
2009	I Can't Believe It's Not Better	Bob Hilbert	TV movie
2010	Smoking Will Kill You	Bill	Short film
2011	I Love You Too	Racquetball Guy #1	Feature film
2012	The Strange Calls	Officer Tony Banks	Short film
2011	How to Make a Monster	Ross	Short film
2011	Clicked	Jake	Short film
2012	Scumbus	Jessie Redmond	Feature film
2013	The 8 Inch Pinch	Constable Benchley	
2013	Martha Arthur	Eric Colby	Short film
2014	Josh	Josh Hemsworth	Short film
2016	Comedy Showroom: Bleak	Matt	TV movie
2019	Koko: A Red Dog Story	Kriv Stenders	Feature film
2019	Pentimento	Noah	Short film
2020	Teenage Rangers	Davis	Short film
2021	Don't Come In..Yet!		Short film
2023	Ashes	Greta Garbo	Short film

=== Television ===
Year	Title	Role	Type
2001	Crash Palace	Bryan Rossiter	TV series
2003	All Saints	Chris Wiley	TV series, 1 episode
2004	McLeod's Daughters	Gary	TV series, 1 episode
2008	The Strip	Dayne Gibson	TV series, 1 episode
2010	The Librarians	Dave	TV series, 1 episode
2010	Sleuth 101	Nigel Hay	TV series, season 1, episode 6: "Late and Live starring Julia Morris"
2012	The Strange Calls	Officer Tony Banks	Miniseries, 6 episodes
2012	Outland	Max	Miniseries, 6 episodes
2012	Tangle	Josh Gray	TV series, 1 episode
2011–12	Laid	Zach	TV series, 12 episodes)
2012	Lowdown	Brent Morrison	TV series, 1 episode
2013	#7DaysLater	Prime Minister Toby Mann	TV series, 1 episode
2014	Offspring	Stephen	TV series, 1 episode
2014	Night Terrace	Hostile Takeover Commander / Vraxnol	Podcast series, 2 episodes
2014–19	Utopia	Karsten Leith	TV series, seasons 1–4, 16 episodes
2015	House Husbands	Joel	TV series, 1 episode
2016	Molly	Morris	Miniseries, 1 episode
2017	Get Krack!n	Hunter Jack	TV series, 1 episode
2018	Wrong Kind of Black	Barry	Miniseries, 4 episodes
2018	True Story with Hamish & Andy	Boyfriend Andy	TV series, season 2, episode 9: "Jeremy's Nerd Candy Story"
2019	Bad Mothers	Detective Holland	Miniseries, 5 episodes
2019	Metro Sexual	Nurse Fletcher	TV series, 1 episode
2019–21	Ms Fisher's Modern Murder Mysteries	Samuel Birnside	TV series, 12 episodes
2021	La Brea	Senior Agent Adam Markman	TV series, 8 episodes
2023	North Shore	Justin Makepeace	TV series, 5 episodes
2023	Rock Island Mysteries	Radio DJ	TV series:3 episodes
2023–present	Scrublands	Doug Monkton	TV series

=== Television (as self) ===
Year	Title	Role	Type
2008–09	This Is Your Laugh	Improvisational actor	TV series
2009	Thank God You're Here	Self	TV series, 2 episodes
2009	The Breast Darn Show in Town	Guest	TV special
2011	Some Say Love	Various characters	TV series, 1 episode
2012	The Unbelievable Truth	Guest	TV series
2012	Randling	Panellist	TV series
2013	Tractor Monkeys	Team member	TV series, season 1, episode 3
2013–14	Slide Show	Team Captain	TV series
2014	New Year's Eve broadcast for the ABC	Co-host (with Julia Zemiro	TV special
2015	Junior Eurovision Song Contest	Commentator	TV special
2015	Darren & Brose	Guest	TV series, episode 4
2016	The Big Music Quiz	Guest	TV series, episode 7

== Audio series ==
Year	Title	Role	Notes
2021	The Bazura Project's Radio Free Cinema	Guest	
2023	Night Terrace	Vraxnall / Hostile Takeover Commander	Episodes: "Moving House" / "The Outsourcing"

== Stage ==
Year	Title	Role	Type
1994	A Streetcar Named Desire		New Dolphin Theatre, Perth
2000–01	Troilus and Cressida	Troilus	Melbourne Athenaeum, Playhouse, Canberra & Sydney Opera House for Bell Shakespeare
2006–07	Like There's No Tomorrow		Old Fitzroy Theatre & Newtown Theatre
2006	Eddie, Eddie's Id, Eddie's Ego and Every-eddie-else		Newtown Theatre
2007	Strangelove The Musical		Fortyfivedownstairs
2008	Beaconsfield: A Musical in A-Flat Minor		The Butterfly Club, Melbourne
2009	Beaconsfield: A Musical In No Particular Key		Arthur's Bar at Rosati, Melbourne
2009	33 Variations	Mike	Comedy Theatre, Melbourne
2012	Strange Interlude	Sam	Belvoir St. Theatre
2012	Private Lives	Victor Prynne	Belvoir St Theatre
2013	The Cherry Orchard	Trofimov	Southbank Theatre for MTC
2014	The Speechmaker	Ed	Playhouse, Melbourne for MTC
2014	Children of the Sun	Protasov	Sydney Opera House for STC
2016	The Beast	Rob	Sydney Opera House, Comedy Theatre, Melbourne & Lyric Theatre, QPAC
2018	Bliss	Harry Joy	Malthouse Theatre & Belvoir St Theatre
2020	Home, I'm Darling	Johnny	Southbank Theatre for MTC
2020	Summerfolk		Belvoir St Theatre
2021	The Boomkak Panto	John	Belvoir St Theatre
2023	Starfish the Redacted		La Mama for The New Rich Theatre Co
	Wolf Lullaby		
	Macbeth		
	Romeo and Juliet		

== Awards and nominations ==
Year	Festival	Award	Nominated work	Result
2012	Monte-Carlo Television Festival	Golden Nymph Award for Outstanding Actor in a Comedy Series	Laid	Nominated
2012	Equity Ensemble Awards	Outstanding Performance by an Ensemble in a Comedy Series	Laid	Nominated
2013	Equity Ensemble Awards	Outstanding Performance by an Ensemble in a Comedy Series	Outland	Nominated
2013	Equity Ensemble Awards	Outstanding Performance by an Ensemble in a Comedy Series	Laid	Nominated
2020	The Monthly Film Festival (TMFF)	Best Actor	Pentimento	Nominated
2020	Top Shorts Film Festival	Best Actor	Pentimento	Won
