= Swank diet =

Dietary theory

The Swank Diet is a diet that is low in saturated fat, which was proposed in 1949 by Roy Laver Swank (1909–2008), academic neurologist at the University of Oregon, for the treatment of multiple sclerosis.

The claims made for the diet are unsubstantiated.

== The diet ==
According to the Swank diet web site, the diet consists of:

1. Saturated fat should not exceed 15 grams per day
2. Unsaturated fat (oils) should be kept to 20–50 grams per day
3. No red meat for the first year; after that, a maximum of 3 oz (85 g) of red meat per week
4. Dairy products must contain 1% or less butterfat
5. No processed foods containing saturated fat
6. A good source of omega-3 (oily fish, Flaxseed, cod liver oil, cod liver oil tablets, etc.) along with a multi-vitamin and mineral supplement are recommended daily
7. Wheat, gluten or dairy product quantities are not restricted

Swank claimed that the diet could "slow progression of the disease as well as benefit overall health".

== Effectiveness ==
There is no good medical evidence supporting the use of the Swank or any alternative diet for the treatment of MS. The British Dietetic Association does not recommend the Swank diet, or any other alternative diet, for people with multiple sclerosis.
