= Roy Allen (footballer) =

Australian rules footballer and umpire

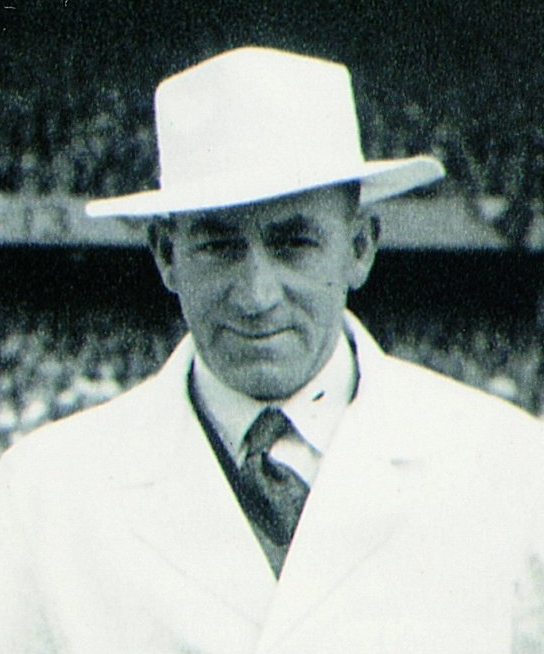

Personal information
- Full name: Roland Roy Allen
- Born: 27 March 1901; Korweinguboora, Victoria
- Died: 17 November 2001 (aged 100); Melbourne
- Height: 180 cm (5 ft 11 in)
- Weight: 73.5 kg (162 lb)

Playing career^{1}
Years	Club	Games (Goals)	
1924	Collingwood	2 (0)	

Umpiring career
Years	League	Role	Games
1930–1938 1931 1940–1953	VFL; VFL; VFL	Field; Boundary; Goal	2 VFL, 171 VCFL; 1 VFL; 209 VFL, 1 VCFL
- ^{1} Playing statistics correct to the end of 1924.

Roland Roy Allen (27 March 1901 – 17 November 2001) was an Australian rules football player and umpire. He played for Collingwood in the Victorian Football League (VFL). He umpired as a field, boundary and goal umpire on the VFL list of umpires. Allen was also a cricketer who played for Collingwood in the Victorian Cricket Association. He was the second former VFL player to reach 100 years of age.

== Early life ==
Allen was born in Korweinguboora, Victoria and his family moved to Collingwood where he attended Clifton Hill Primary School and became a supporter of the local VFL team. However, the first VFL match he attended was the 1913 grand final between Fitzroy and St Kilda. When he did watch Collingwood he often carried in the bag of Dick Lee to avoid paying the admittance fee.

== Football career ==
In August 1918 Allen was invited to try out with the Collingwood second eighteens, then known as Collingwood District, and played in their 1919 and 1920 premierships and a losing grand final in 1921.

Persistence and good form finally paid off and, wearing guernsey number one, Allen made his debut for Collingwood in round 3 1924 versus Melbourne. He recalled:

I didn't have a bad day. I did pretty well and started on the ground. Nerves got me though. I wasn't a very cheeky bloke. I was very quiet and I think you've got to have a bit of cheek. When I was waiting for a rubdown they all (the other players) had a special bloke and I didn't feel part of it. It was a big crowd and we went on to win the game (by a point) and I got an extra quid from an influential supporter named Mr Wren who used to do that if we won. I would have played against Carlton the next week, but I got a whack in the cheek at training the next Thursday night and I was too crook to play.

Recovering from the knock Allen played his second, and final, VFL match in round 6. Dropped for the following week he never regained a senior position and finished his career in the second eighteens with a third premiership in 1925.

== Field umpiring career ==
Allen joined the VFL Second Eighteens list of umpires in 1929 and the following season was appointed to the VFL senior list. The list provided field umpires to the VFL and a number of country competitions and Allen officiated in the major Bendigo, Ballarat and Gippsland leagues through the 1930 season.

In 1931 the VFL appointed one field umpire to each senior match as a boundary umpire in case the appointed field umpire became incapacitated. It was in this capacity that Allen umpired his single match as a VFL boundary umpire – round 6, Fitzroy versus Essendon – earning Heritage Number 227. Three weeks later he was appointed to his single VFL match as a field umpire, Fitzroy versus Richmond earning Heritage Number 152.

Neither the daily newspapers nor the spectators commented favourably on Allen's performance. The Argus noted "the decisions of the umpire continued to bewilder players" while The Age commented on "passing over of flagrant breaches" and "inconsistency of awards". This led to prolonged hooting and the throwing of apple cores and other missiles as the umpires left the field at half time.

The following week experienced umpire Bob Scott had recovered from an ankle injury and Allen was dropped to make space for him. He returned to country football and was not given another chance at senior level.

From 1930 to 1938 Allen umpired 140 country matches including 9 grand finals. His most successful season was 1935 when he officiated in the Cowwarr, West Gippsland and Central Gippsland leagues grand finals.

== Goal umpiring career ==
After a year away from umpiring Allen rejoined the VFL list in 1940 this time as a goal umpire. His first match was in round 1 at the same venue as his lone field and boundary appointments – Brunswick Street – and earned him Heritage Number 92. This time Fitzroy won, defeating St Kilda.

In his first two years Allen was appointed to both VFL Lightning Premierships and in 1942 his first VFL final. For the remainder of his career he missed a finals appointment in only one season (1945).

As a goal umpire Allen umpired two VFL grand finals – 1950 and 1953. The latter would be Allen's last match. He retired as a goal umpire with a total of 209 VFL matches (11 finals).

In the final home and away round of 1951 Allen was appointed to umpire the Carlton versus Essendon match. In the second quarter both he and boundary umpire Herb Kent reported Essendon full-forward John Coleman and his opponent, Harry Caspar, for striking each other. At the subsequent tribunal hearing both umpires said Coleman struck Caspar in retaliation, Allen stating, "Coleman was only defending himself. Had I been in the same position, I would have done exactly as he did."

== Umpires' Association ==
Allen was a member of the Victorian Football League Umpires' Association (VFLUA) from 1930 to 1953 with the exception of 1939. Elected junior vice-president in 1942 he succeeded to the presidency in 1943, a year early, when Senior Vice-president Alan Coward was unable to take up the role.

From 1944 to 1946 he served on the Executive Committee and following his retirement was auditor for the association from 1954 to 1972. He was elected a life member in 1944 and awarded a Lifetime Achievement Award in 1972. Allen was one of the original 99 inductees into the AFLUA Hall of Fame.

== Longevity ==
On 27 March 2001 Allen became only the second VFL player to attain the age of 100 years. The first was Newton Chandler. The event was celebrated by Collingwood and the AFL Umpires' Association. At the same time Allen was nominated for and received an Australian Sports Medal for his contribution to sport.
