= All Aussie Adventures =

- Russell Coight's All Aussie Adventures logo (2018)
- Genre: Comedy; Mockumentary; Adventure travel
- Created by: Tom Gleisner
- Written by: Tom Gleisner (main); Santo Cilauro (additional); Glenn Robbins (additional); Rob Sitch (additional)
- Starring: Glenn Robbins
- No. of seasons: 3
- No. of episodes: 21

Production
- Executive producers: Tom Gleisner; Santo Cilauro; Michael Hirsh; Rob Sitch
- Producer: Susannah Mott
- Cinematography: Santo Cilauro
- Editor: Roberta Horslie
- Running time: 22 minutes
- Production company: Working Dog Productions

Original release
- Network: Network Ten
- Release: 5 August 2001 – 9 September 2018

All Aussie Adventures also known as Russell Coight's All Aussie Adventures, is an Australian mockumentary television series that parodies the travel-adventure genre. Comedian Glenn Robbins plays Russell Coight, a survival and wildlife expert who charts his disastrous travels through Australia, spreading misinformation and causing accidents.

The series originally ran for two seasons on Network Ten from 5 August 2001 to 29 September 2002. A telemovie, Russell Coight's Celebrity Challenge, which featured fictional celebrities joining Coight in the outback, aired on 14 November 2004. A third season premiered on 5 August 2018.

An official website for the show titled “bigcoight.com” (which can be seen towards the end credits of almost every episode) had been left untouched since 2004, until mid 2019 when it was purchased as a redirect to All Aussie Adventure's main website.

== Series overview ==
Season	Episodes	Originally aired		DVD release
Season	Episodes	Season premiere	Season finale	Region 4
1	6	5 August 2001	9 September 2001	20 November 2002
2	7	18 August 2002	29 September 2002	20 November 2002
TV Movie	1	14 November 2004		16 November 2004
3	7	5 August 2018	9 September 2018	3 October 2018

== Premise ==
The series parodies the adventure genre, which included the travels of the Leyland brothers, The Bush Tucker Man, Malcolm Douglas, Steve Irwin, Ben Cropp, Harry Butler and Alby Mangels. In these programs the host travels the wilderness meeting local people and providing insight into the flora and fauna of the country. The narration (typically provided by the host) often verges on hyperbole.

Original All Aussie Adventures logo (2001–2002)

Episodes of All Aussie Adventures generally follow a similar format: Coight greets the audience and explains his latest reason for outback travel – often to help out a "mate". He ends each introduction with the tagline "So what are we waiting for, let's get cracking on another All Aussie Adventure".

== Russell Coight ==
The series is presented as if Russell Coight were a real person, eschewing screen credit for his portrayer Glenn Robbins. The only mention of Robbins is at the end of the credits, when he is thanked "for his directorial assistance".

Perhaps the kindest description of Russell Coight is "accident-prone" – if something can go wrong for him, it will, like either Murphy's law or Finagle's law. Coight is a naturally outgoing man and comfortable in front of the camera, so is never shy in revealing private aspects of his personality (he even showers in front of the camera). Over the series the audience discovers various hints to his character, such as a glimpse of his card for the local adult video store.

Russell Coight identifies himself as an 'outback man', who strongly endorses the ways of the outback, as opposed to the ways of urban life. When Russell finds numerous tourists stuck on the outback road, he hastily refers to them as "city slickers" before he tries to help them, albeit unsuccessfully. He also perceives these "city slickers" as being overly affluent, and who waste their money on "high-tech gadgets" and five-star hotels, along with comparing such things to his own outback lifestyle, which includes making his own chair and bathing in a freshwater billabong.

His sister Meredith – who is never seen – is credited for everything from being a crocodile tamer to a stunt coordinator. In one episode, "Daintree", she is heard singing dreamily a somewhat dubious song, "Daintree", from her album Daintree, on the Daintree label.

Following the success of the first series, comedian and talk show host Rove McManus interviewed Russell Coight, who provided information on his fictional background.

"Wallaby Jack", a similar character from The Late Show, is a precursor to Coight. Tom Gleisner, a writer for both series, points this out in The Late Show DVD audio commentary.

From 2023 onwards, Russell Coight has made appearances in several Mitsubishi Outlander commercials, with these commercials seeking to dispel myths regarding the offroad capabilities of electric vehicles.

In 2024, Russell Coight made a cameo appearance on season 6, episode 1 of Thank God You're Here.

== Parody aspects ==
=== Common gags ===
Much of the humor of All Aussie Adventures is contained in the sight gags. Tents collapse, camp fires rage out of control, cars roll away and Coight trips and falls painfully.

Coight regularly suffers from flatulence, especially when he is sitting in a quiet idyllic pool, whereupon bubbles inevitably rise to the surface. When bending over, he will occasionally pass wind.

Coight is fond of saving indigenous wildlife and preserving historical Australian sites. However, due to Coight's clumsiness and/or inattentiveness he often unintentionally destroys the animal or location.

Coight often attempts to make jokes with his friends during the programs. Unfortunately, most of these fall flat. He presents himself as a man with "mates" all around Australia, whom he likes to bring into his shows. These "mates" usually avoid him, or barely know him, but he seems oblivious to any embarrassment this should cause him on air.

In one episode an Indigenous Australian is educating Coight on finding bush tucker. Coight attempts to tell the joke about being on a "seafood diet...I see food and I eat it", achieving absolutely no reaction. The guest is as clueless as Coight, rejecting all Coight's ideas on bush tucker, and telling Coight that the outback is full of wild bananas, out of season at the time.

Coight also claims to be one of the greatest bird-callers in the business with over 100 different bird calls in his repertoire (most of which sound identical). According to Coight "once you get your finger in the right position and your tongue doing the same..... the rest is easy". He then demonstrates a bird call but his flatulence interrupts it. He tries to downplay this by suggesting the flatus was "the reply call of an injured bird".

=== Stock footage ===
Another source of humor is the frequent use of stock footage in incongruous situations. The most well-known example of this is the "handshaking shot".

When Coight meets a new character the program will cut to a closeup shot of their handshake. As a gag, this is clearly a shot taken at a different time with different people. When Coight shakes hands with an indigenous Australian, the closeup will show two white hands. When he shakes hands with a white Australian, the closeup will show a black and a white hand. This serves to highlight the artificial and constructed nature of this sort of television series banter.

Scenery footage is often re-used in the different episodes. Footage obviously shot in Victoria will be shown when Coight is supposedly far into the Northern Territory.

Footage of the Toyota Land Cruiser used in the show is often reused, meaning the number plate often changes throughout the episode. Beginning in Season 3, the original vehicle is replaced by a Land Rover Defender.

== Episodes ==
=== Season 1 (2001) ===
No. overall	No. in season	Title	Directed by	Written by	Original release date
1	1	"Red Centre: Part 1"	Tom Gleisner	Tom Gleisner	5 August 2001
Russell heads North to help an old mate with the annual cattle muster. Along the way he searches for some bush tucker, helps a motorist who has run into trouble, and offers us many invaluable tips for survival situations in the outback.
2	2	"Red Centre: Part 2"	Tom Gleisner	Tom Gleisner	12 August 2001
After Russell offers some insights into the old Ghan railway, he finally arrives at the cattle muster. We get to see his expert country dancing skills and his amazing talents with the whip.
3	3	"Daintree"	Tom Gleisner	Tom Gleisner	19 August 2001
Russell travels to the magnificent Daintree Rainforest in Northern Queensland and visits some of the incredible highlights of the area, including the Great Barrier Reef. He also helps out an old mate with a crocodile problem.
4	4	"High Country: Part 1"	Tom Gleisner	Tom Gleisner	26 August 2001
Russell takes three city kids, Hayley, Justin and Phil, on a tour of the outback. He teaches them valuable lessons so that they will be able to survive in an emergency. Russell also helps out two stranded motorists.
5	5	"High Country: Part 2"	Tom Gleisner	Tom Gleisner	2 September 2001
Russell introduces the kids to the intricate art of sheep shearing and the safe way to handle and use firearms. Also, they are taught the correct way to set a trap to catch some dinner.
6	6	"Cooktown"	Tom Gleisner	Tom Gleisner	9 September 2001
Russell heads up to North Queensland for his niece's wedding. Along the way he enters into a fishing competition with some old mates.

=== Season 2 (2002) ===
No. overall	No. in season	Title	Directed by	Written by	Original release date
7	1	"Muster"	Tom Gleisner	Tom Gleisner	18 August 2002
Russell travels to outback New South Wales for a muster with some old mates. Along the way he reveals secrets such as intricate home-made camp seats.
8	2	"Tourists: Part 1"	Tom Gleisner	Tom Gleisner	25 August 2002
Russell takes some international tourists to the outback for the experience of their lives. Russell gives some amazing facts and figures on the high country of Australia to his guests.
9	3	"Tourists: Part 2"	Tom Gleisner	Tom Gleisner	1 September 2002
Russell continues his journey with his group of international travellers through Australia's wilderness and they meet up with an old mate of Russell's who joins them by the fire.
10	4	"Explorer: Part 1"	Tom Gleisner	Tom Gleisner	8 September 2002
Russell attempts to retrace the steps of two of the country's earliest explorers, Oscar Forbes and William Montgomery. He hopes to locate the grave of Forbes which has never been found. During his trip, he helps out an old mate's wife with a snake problem, and drops in on a camel farm.
11	5	"Explorer: Part 2"	Tom Gleisner	Tom Gleisner	15 September 2002
As Russell continues his journey to find Forbes' grave, he drops in on a few old mates and has a chat with them. He eventually finds the resting place of the explorer, and sets his own memorial for the man.
12	6	"Rare Roo"	Tom Gleisner	Tom Gleisner	22 September 2002
Russell travels through the outback on a mission to release a rare kangaroo back to his habitat. Along the way he helps out some young surf lifesavers by showing them how the drills should be done, and assists a couple of female backpackers.
13	7	"Rogue Croc"	Tom Gleisner	Tom Gleisner	29 September 2002
Russell takes one of his most eager fans out to the outback for the experience of a lifetime. He imparts his knowledge about bush traps and camp fires, plus they play a few night games.

=== Television movie (2004) ===
No.	Title	Directed by	Written by	Original release date
14	"Russell Coight's Celebrity Challenge"	Tom Gleisner & Santo Cilauro	Tom Gleisner	14 November 2004
In an effort to raise money for charity, Russell decides to lead a group of celebrities on a coast-to-coast trek across Australia from east to west in just seven days.

=== Season 3 (2018) ===
On 4 November 2016, All Aussie Adventures was renewed for a third season and was scheduled to return in 2017. In August 2017, the series was rescheduled to air in 2018. The series premiered on 5 August 2018. The final two episodes aired on 9 September 2018, being broadcast consecutively.

No. overall	No. in season	Title	Directed by	Written by	Original release date	Viewers (millions)
15	1	"Episode 1"	Tom Gleisner	Tom Gleisner, Glenn Robbins, Santo Cilauro, Rob Sitch	5 August 2018	1,071,000
Russell returns to the outback where he helps rescue a group of girl guides, catches up with an aboriginal mate for some bush tips and deals with a dangerous roving reptile. All this, plus a behind-the-scenes look at his 'Birds of Prey Attack Show' (now closed pending a workplace safety investigation).
16	2	"Episode 2"	Tom Gleisner	Tom Gleisner, Glenn Robbins, Santo Cilauro, Rob Sitch	12 August 2018	775,000
Russell heads bush in order to test out some new camping equipment, help some old farming mates get rid of their rabbits and share a few outback safety tips. Plus, when a rare animal must be released back into the wild, he lends a hand (along with three fingers).
17	3	"Episode 3"	Tom Gleisner	Tom Gleisner, Glenn Robbins, Santo Cilauro, Rob Sitch	19 August 2018	731,000
Russell hits the road to learn a little about aboriginal art, catch up with an old farmer mate and help get rid of a dangerous snake in a shed (he gets rid of both the snake and the shed). All this, plus Russell gives some school kids an experience they will never forget (although counseling has been arranged).
18	4	"Episode 4"	Tom Gleisner	Tom Gleisner, Glenn Robbins, Santo Cilauro, Rob Sitch	26 August 2018	618,000
The stakes are raised when Russell is asked to personally escort two international scientists deep into the heart of the Daintree Rainforest. Not everything goes according to plan (one of the scientists is still lost just south of Cooktown) but thanks to Russell's efforts, several rare animal species are spotted, photographed and cooked in a camp oven.
19	5	"Episode 5"	Tom Gleisner	Tom Gleisner, Glenn Robbins, Santo Cilauro, Rob Sitch	2 September 2018	622,000
After checking out some ancient aboriginal artwork, Russell drops by a remote farm to help out a mate. He then heads deep into croc country before tracking down some lost hikers and rescuing a pair of broken down pensioners.
20	6	"Episode 6"	Tom Gleisner	Tom Gleisner, Glenn Robbins, Santo Cilauro, Rob Sitch	9 September 2018	599,000
In this special episode Russell takes his 23-year-old niece Chrissie Coight into the outback to teach her a thing or two about desert survival. They are both eventually winched to safety.
21	7	"Episode 7"	Tom Gleisner	Tom Gleisner, Glenn Robbins, Santo Cilauro, Rob Sitch	9 September 2018	577,000
In the final episode Russell shares his love of native fauna with some unsuspecting students (not suitable for children), does a bit of bush water-skiing (warning; low-level male nudity involved) and catches up with an old mate for a fishing trip with a difference. No one catches a fish. All this plus camping tips, boat safety advice and snakes in a shed.

== Viewership ==
Season	Episodes	Originally aired		Viewers (millions)	Rank
Season	Episodes	Season premiere	Season finale	Viewers (millions)	Rank
1	6	5 August 2001	9 September 2001	1.554	#6
2	7	18 August 2002	29 September 2002	1.721	#2
3	7	5 August 2018	9 September 2018	0.713	TBA
