= TV Burp (Australian TV series) =

Television series

- Created by: Harry Hill
- Presented by: Ed Kavalee
- Country of origin: Australia
- No. of seasons: 1
- No. of episodes: 8

Production
- Production location: HSV7 Melbourne
- Running time: 30 minutes per episode Including commercials

Original release
- Network: Seven Network
- Release: 23 July – 10 September 2009

Related
- The Soup; Harry Hill's TV Burp

TV Burp is an Australian television comedy program which premiered on the Seven Network on 23 July 2009 hosted by Ed Kavalee.

The show presents a satirical look at the previous week's television, including extracts from TV shows with added sketches, observational voice-overs, and guest appearances.

The show is based on the original British award-winning TV series Harry Hill's TV Burp. The first season finished on Thursday 10 September 2009, with Seven hoping to bring it back some time in the near future, though the second series did not air in 2010.

== Format ==
TV Burp lampoons TV shows from all Australian television networks. Ed Kavalee would introduce the show and attempt to make fun of the lines that are said on the TV show, usually by taking them out of context, or he will try to mock the acting on the said TV show. Generally, the TV shows which are mocked are either reality, drama or game shows, such as Home and Away and MasterChef Australia.

== Reception ==
The first episode of TV Burp was widely watched, attracting an audience of 1.007 million people. The second episode did not rate as well, below 900,000 viewers. The third ranked even lower, rating under 775,000 viewers.

Episode No.	Airdate	Ratings (in millions)	Nightly Rank	Weekly Rank
1	23 July 2009	1.007	12th	46th
2	30 July 2009	0.846	16th	64th
3	6 August 2009	0.774	19th	-
4	13 August 2009	-	-	-
5	20 August 2009	-	-	-
6	27 August 2009	-	-	-
7	3 September 2009	-	-	-
8	10 September 2009	-	-	-

('-' denotes unknown)
