= Working Dog Productions =

Australian production company

Working Dog Productions Pty. Ltd.
- Type: Private company
- Industry: Production company
- Founded: 1993; 33 years ago
- Founders: Santo Cilauro; Rob Sitch; Jane Kennedy; Tom Gleisner; Michael Hirsh
- Headquarters: Melbourne, Australia
- Website: www.workingdog.com

Working Dog Productions (originally Frontline Television Productions Pty Ltd) is a film and television production company based in Melbourne, Australia. It was formed in 1993 by actors Santo Cilauro, Rob Sitch, Jane Kennedy, Tom Gleisner, and producer Michael Hirsh.

== History ==
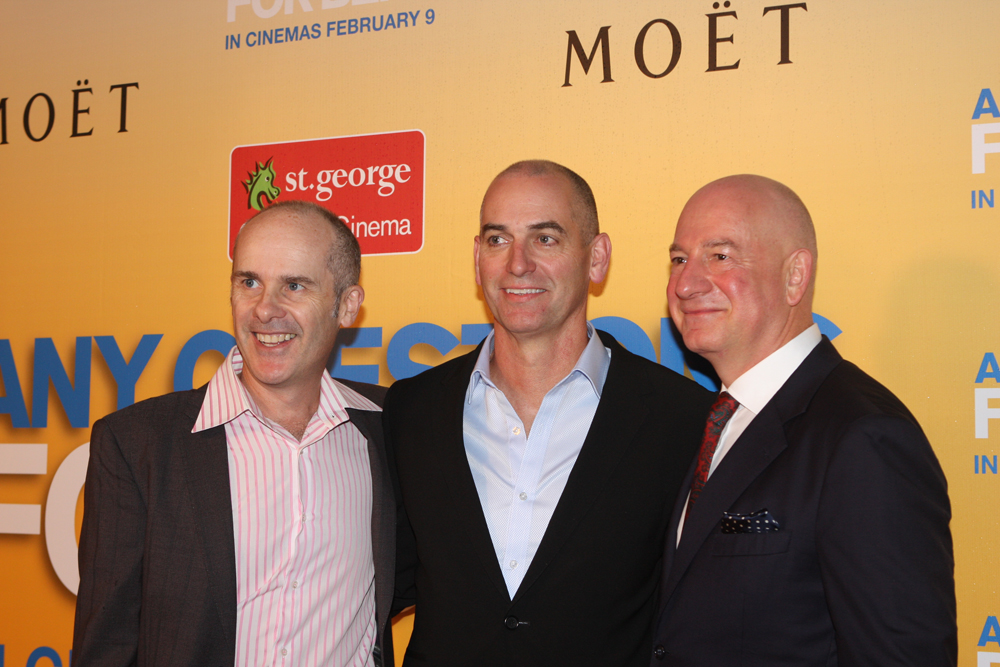
Three of Working Dog's founders: Tom Gleisner (left), Rob Sitch (middle), and Michael Hirsh (right)

Frontline Television Productions Pty Ltd was formed in 1993 by five collaborators who had worked together on earlier comedy projects, actors Santo Cilauro, Rob Sitch, Jane Kennedy, Tom Gleisner, and producer Michael Hirsh. The group of actors became known through their earlier hit comedy sketch show The D-Generation (1986–1987) and The Late Show (1992), forming their production company with producer Michael Hirsh before creating Frontline under the banner of Working Dog.

It adopted the name Working Dog Productions in the mid-1990s. The founders have described the company origin as "five friends formed a production company with a dodgy camcorder and a dream".

== Description ==
Working Dog Productions is a film and television production company based in Melbourne, Victoria.

The company name logo (an Australian Cattle Dog) reflect the founders' affection for dogs, and the company has retained the original creative core across decades while expanding into multi-platform production and a small executive/staff structure. They picked a female dog for the Australian cattle dog breed.

== Productions ==
In addition to television and film, Working Dog Productions have also ventured into books, stage shows, and podcasts.

=== Television ===
Programs with a shaded background indicate the program is still in production.

Title	Network	Genre	Years	Seasons
Frontline	ABC	Comedy, Satire	1994–1997	3 seasons, 39 episodes
Behind the Frontline	ABC	Documentary	1995	1 documentary
Funky Squad	ABC	Comedy	1995	1 season, 7 episodes
The Campaign	ABC	Documentary	1996	2 episodes
A River Somewhere	ABC	Documentary	1997–1998	2 seasons, 13 episodes
The Panel	Network Ten	Talk show	1998–2004	7 seasons, 237 episodes
All Aussie Adventures	Network Ten	Mockumentary	2001–2002, 2018	3 seasons, 20 episodes
The Panel Christmas Wrap	Network Ten	Talk show	2003–2007	5 annual specials
Russell Coight's Celebrity Challenge	Network Ten	Mockumentary	2004	1 telemovie
Thank God You're Here	Network Ten (2006–2007, 2023–present); Seven Network (2009)	Improvised comedy	2006–2009, 2023–present	5 seasons, 49 episodes
Thank God You're Here	NBC	Comedy	2007	1 season, 7 episodes
The Hollowmen	ABC	Comedy	2008	2 seasons, 12 episodes
Santo, Sam and Ed's Cup Fever!	SBS	Sport, Comedy	2010	1 season, 26 episodes
Santo, Sam and Ed's Sports Fever!	7mate/Seven Network	Sport, Comedy	2012	1 season, 10 episodes
Pictures of You	Seven Network	Talk show	2012	1 season, 16 episodes
Audrey's Kitchen	ABC	Comedy	2012–2013	2 seasons, 20 episodes
Santo, Sam and Ed's Total Football	Fox Sports	Sports, Comedy	2013–2015	2 seasons, 56 episodes
Have You Been Paying Attention?	Network Ten	Game show	2013–present	10 seasons, 261 episodes
Utopia	ABC	Comedy	2014–present	5 seasons, 40 episodes
Pacific Heat	The Comedy Channel	Animated Sitcom	2016–2017	1 season, 13 episodes
The Cheap Seats	Network Ten	Comedy, Current Affairs	2021–present	4 seasons, 91 episodes

=== Film ===
Title	Genre	Release date	Distributor
The Castle	Comedy	10 April 1997	Village Roadshow
The Dish	Comedy	19 October 2000	Roadshow Entertainment
Any Questions for Ben?	Comedy	9 February 2012	Roadshow Films

=== Books ===
Books which have been published by Working Dog include, but are not limited to, mock travel guides. Books published by Working Dog include:

- Molvania: A Land Untouched by Modern Dentistry by Santo Cilauro, Tom Gleisner and Rob Sitch, 2003. ISBN 1-58567-619-5
- Phaic Tan: Sunstroke on a Shoestring by Santo Cilauro, Tom Gleisner and Rob Sitch, 2004. ISBN 0-8118-5365-9
- San Sombrero: A Land of Carnivals, Cocktails and Coups by Santo Cilauro, Tom Gleisner and Rob Sitch, 2006. ISBN 0-8118-5619-4
- Molvanian Baby Names: With Meanings, Derivations And Probable Pronunciations, by Santo Cilauro, Tom Gleisner and Rob Sitch 2009. ISBN 978-1-74066-859-0

=== Stage ===
Working Dog produced the stage show The Speechmaker. The show was written by Working Dog's Sitch, Cilauro, and Gleisner and had a sellout season at the Melbourne Theatre Company. Gleisner has produced a musical under the Working Dog brand titled Bloom.

=== Podcasts ===
- Santo, Sam & Ed's Total Football Podcast (2017–present on ABC iview)
- Santo, Sam & Ed's Cup Fever! Podcast (2018 on ABC iview)

== See also ==
- List of film production companies
- List of television production companies
