= Santo Cilauro =

Australian comedian, producer and screenwriter

- Born: Santo Luigi Cilauro; 25 November 1961 (age 64); Melbourne, Victoria, Australia
- Other names: Snatto Ghauro, Zladko Vladcik
- Education: University of Melbourne (BA, LL.B.)
- Occupations: Comedian; actor; television presenter; author; radio host; producer; writer
- Known for: The Late Show, The Panel, The Dish, The Castle, Frontline and Santo, Sam and Ed's Cup Fever!
- Children: 2

Santo Luigi Cilauro (born 25 November 1961) is an Australian comedian, television and feature film producer, screenwriter, actor, author and cameraman who is also a co-founder of The D-Generation. Known as the weatherman in Frontline, he is also an author and former radio presenter on Triple M, and achieved worldwide fame with the viral video Elektronik Supersonik.

== Early life ==
Cilauro was born in 1961 in Melbourne, Australia to parents of Italian descent. Cilauro attended Xavier College and the University of Melbourne and graduated with a Bachelor of Arts and a Bachelor of Laws in 1987.

In 1984, while walking to his aunt's house in Melbourne, he stumbled across a Juventus press conference during their tour of Australia, and after seeing coach Giovanni Trapattoni struggle to answer questions in English, used his Italian skills to translate, which resulted in Cilauro becoming the team translator for the rest of the tour.

== Acting and production work ==
Cilauro started collaborating with Rob Sitch and Tom Gleisner in comedy theatre productions and tours. He is one of the co-founders of The D-Generation.

Cilauro wrote for, and performed in, the troupe's show during its 1986–87 run on ABC TV (which also led to the album The Satanic Sketches). Cilauro continued as a member of the D-Gen when the team hosted their Breakfast Show on Triple M radio (1986–1992), appearing as the simple-minded "Wayne from St Albans" and "Gino Tagliatoni" amongst other roles. Cilauro was a writer/performer on the D-Generation's 1992–1993 sketch comedy The Late Show, appearing on such segments as Graham & the Colonel, The Oz Brothers and Jeff & Terry Bailey.

After the second and last season of The Late Show, Cilauro starred as Stix in the 1994 ABC cop show satire Funky Squad, which he also co-created and served as one of the writer/producer/directors. He went on to help set up the Working Dog production company and was one of the writer/producer/directors of Frontline (1994–97), in which he also had a recurring onscreen role as weatherman Geoffrey Salter. Since then, Cilauro has co-written Working Dog's popular films The Castle (1997) and The Dish (2000) and appeared as a regular member (and occasional host) of the 1998–2003 Network 10 programme The Panel.

Cilauro has been an executive producer of several Working Dog productions, including The Panel, A River Somewhere (1997–98), and All Aussie Adventures (2001–02). He played the Head of Market Research, Theo Tsolakis, on The Hollowmen (2008), a series which Cilauro co-wrote and co-produced. Cilauro also played IT technician Griffin on the Shaun Micallef sitcom Welcher & Welcher (2003) and K2 on the 1996 Working Dog radio sketch Johnny Swank.

During the 2010 FIFA World Cup and 2026 FIFA World Cup, he hosted a nightly comedy show called Santo, Sam and Ed's Cup Fever! live from Melbourne alongside Ed Kavalee and Sam Pang. In 2026 the show's name was shortened to Cup Fever!

In 2014 Cilauro joined his Working Dog colleagues Sitch and Gleisner to stage the group's first play, The Speechmaker.

== Zladko Vladcik ==
Cilauro, along with Rob Sitch and Tom Gleisner, created the popular Internet phenomenon character Zladko "ZLAD!" Vladcik, a Molvanîan synth-pop musician. Zlad was performed by Cilauro to accompany the Jetlag Travel Guide to Molvanîa. Cilauro was, with Sitch and Gleisner, co-author of the Jetlag Travel Guides to Molvanîa, Phaic Tăn and San Sombrèro.

Two music videos were performed by Cilauro as Zladko and Mary Coustas, for "Elektronik – Supersonik" and "I Am the Anti-Pope".

== Italian studies ==
In 2021, Cilauro became the patron of the Australasian Centre of Italian Studies.

== Filmography ==
=== Films ===
Year	Production	Credit	Role	Notes	Ref.
2012	Any Questions for Ben?	Producer, Writer & Camera Operator			
2009	Shintaro!		Himself	Documentary	
2007	The Sound of Aus		Himself	Documentary	
2004	Herman, the Legal Labrador		Sal the Hot Dog Vendor	Voice only	
2001	Numero Bruno		Himself	Documentary	
2000	The Dish	Producer, Writer & Second Unit Director			
1997	The Castle	Writer & Camera Operator			
1996	The Campaign	Director, Writer, Producer & Cinematographer	Himself – Narrator	Documentary	
1988	Billy's Shout	Director		TV Short	

=== Television ===
Year(s)	Television Show	Credit	Role	Notes	Ref.
2026	Cup Fever! 26	Creator, Executive Producer, Writer	Himself		
2016-19	Utopia	Creator, Executive Producer, Writer			
2016	Pacific Heat	Creator, Executive Producer, Writer			
2014–present	Have You Been Paying Attention?	Executive Producer, Panelist	Himself		
2013–15	Santo, Sam and Ed's Total Football	Executive Producer & Writer	Himself		
2012	Audrey's Kitchen	Executive Producer			
2012	Santo, Sam and Ed's Sports Fever!	Executive Producer & Writer	Himself		
2012	Pictures of You	Executive Producer			
2010	Santo, Sam and Ed's Cup Fever!	Executive Producer & Writer	Himself		
2008	The Hollowmen	Creator, Producer, Writer & Camera Operator	Theo Tsolakis		
2007	The Panel: Christmas Wrap	Executive Producer	Himself		
2006	The Panel: Christmas Wrap	Executive Producer	Himself		
2006–2009	Thank God You're Here	Creator, Camera Operator (Series 1–3), Writer & Executive Producer	Himself		
2004	Russell Coight's Celebrity Challenge	Creator, Camera Operator (Series 1–3), Writer & Executive Producer			
2003	Welcher & Welcher		Griffin Griggs		
2001–2002	Russell Coight's All Aussie Adventures	Writer & Camera Operator			
1998–2005	The Panel	Executive Producer	Himself		
1997–1998	A River Somewhere	Executive Producer			
1995	Funky Squad	Creator, Director, Producer & Writer	Stix ('Joey Alvarez')		
1994–1997	Frontline	Creator, Director, Producer & Writer	Geoffrey Salter		
1994	Homicide... 30 Years On		Himself		
1993	Bargearse	Director & Writer	Poloneck		
1993	The Olden Days	Director & Writer	Various		
1992–1993	The Late Show	Director & Writer	Various		
1988	The D Generation Goes Commercial	Writer	Various		
1986–1987	The D Generation	Writer	Various		
