= Opposing force =

Military term

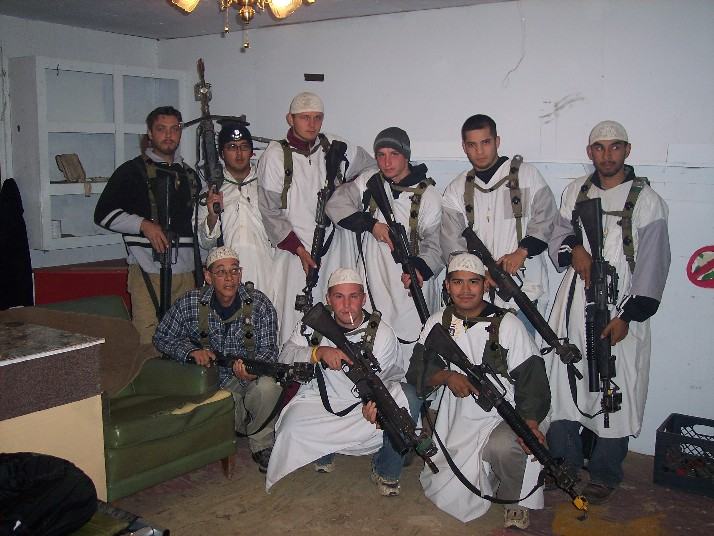
U.S. OPFOR soldiers playing the role of Iraqi insurgents in Fort Polk, Louisiana. (Note: Photo was taken during Operation Cajun Fury with one of the many training exercises that take place at Joint Readiness Training Command (JRTC).)

An opposing force (abbreviated OPFOR or OpFor; alternatively known as enemy force) is a military unit tasked with representing an enemy, usually for training purposes in war game scenarios. The related concept of aggressor squadron is used by some air forces.

At a basic level, a unit might serve as an opposing force for a single scenario, differing from its 'opponents' only in the objectives it is given. However, major armies commonly maintain specialized groups trained to accurately replicate real-life enemies, to provide a more realistic experience for their training opponents. To avoid the diplomatic ramifications of naming a real nation as a likely enemy, training scenarios often use fictionalized versions with different names but similar military characteristics to the expected real-world foes.

== Units ==
=== Canada ===
The Canadian Armed Forces has OPFOR units from the Canadian Manoeuvre Training Centre. A common OPFOR country is the South Atropian People's Army (SAPA).

=== France ===
In the French Army, a FORAD (FORce ADverse, enemy force) is used to train the army, in both the centre d'entraînement au combat (CENTAC, Combat Training Center) of Mailly-le-Camp and in the centre d'entraînement aux actions en zone urbaine (CENZUB, Urban Operations Training Centre). Declassed AMX-30 tanks were used to simulate Soviet T-72s, until 2018.

=== United States ===
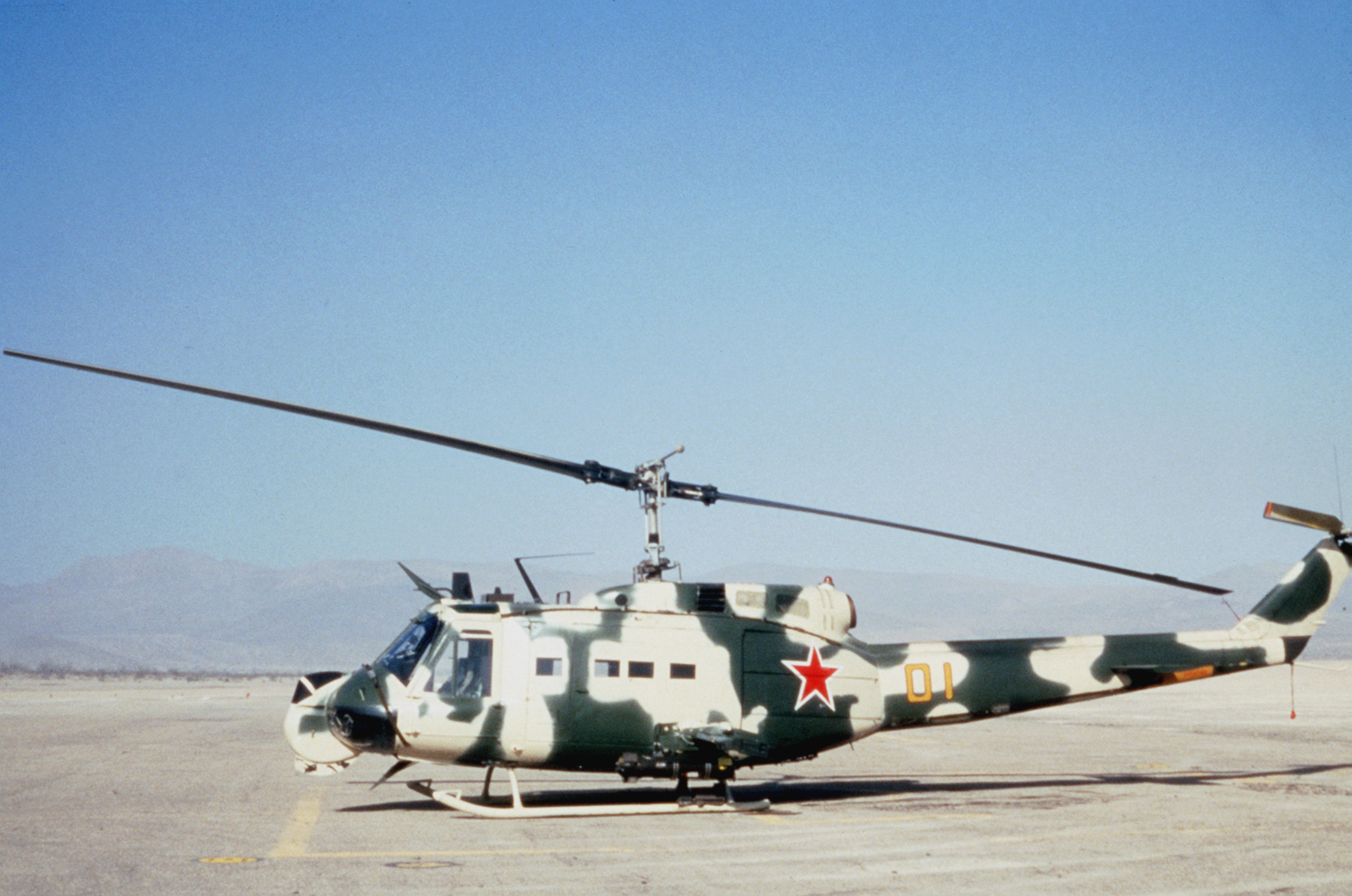
A UH-1H replicating a Mi-24 at Fort Irwin in 1985

Various U.S. military installations or major units have their own local versions of opposing force used for training exercises. There are three major training centers that use home-based OPFOR units for the United States Army:

- The National Training Center (NTC) at Fort Irwin, California; home unit is the 11th Armored Cavalry Regiment (the Blackhorse)
- The Joint Readiness Training Center (JRTC) at Fort Polk, Louisiana; home unit is the 1st Battalion, 509th Parachute Infantry Regiment (the Geronimos)
- The Joint Multinational Readiness Center (JMRC)—formerly known as the Combat Maneuver Training Center (CMTC)—at Hohenfels, Germany; home unit is the 1st Battalion, 4th Infantry Regiment (Separate) (the Warriors)

Since the mid-20th century, the U.S. military has devised fictional countries and opposing forces for training purposes, to make exercises more believable and mark clearer differences between friendly and OPFOR units, while preparing personnel to face unfamiliar enemies instead of otherwise identical "REDFOR" and "BLUFOR" teams. Many of them are loosely based on real or imagined opponents, though the U.S. military officially denies any resemblance. Examples of these fictional settings involving OPFOR factions include:

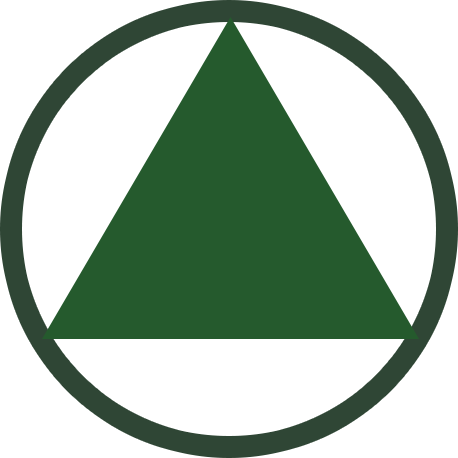
The Circle Trigon Party's emblem

- Aggressor, an Esperanto-speaking European country led by the totalitarian Circle Trigon Party. Aggressor was formed after World War II and was stated to have been at war with the U.S. since fall 1946, having invaded sections of the contiguous U.S., Hawaii, Alaska, Puerto Rico, the Panama Canal, and Canada. The Aggressor Armed Forces, also called the Circle Trigon Army, were modeled after the Wehrmacht with elements of the Red Army and European militaries. Aggressor was used in exercises from 1947 to 1978.
- The People's Democratic Republic of Krasnovia, a communist Eastern Bloc country presumably part of the Warsaw Pact. The Krasnovian Armed Forces were modeled after the Soviet Armed Forces and Warsaw Pact militaries, and were used from 1978 to 1990 at the NTC. When the Soviet Union dissolved, Krasnovia did as well.
- Atlantica, a small continent in the Atlantic Ocean with a history spanning back to the 14th century. In Atlantica is the People's Republic of Pineland, a longtime U.S. ally that has been occupied by the Russian-backed United Provinces of Atlantica, sparking a U.S.-supported guerilla war against its oppressive occupation regime. Also present is the country of Appalachia. Pineland is inspired by Iraq, Afghanistan, and Colombia, and is the setting of "Robin Sage", the culminating exercise of Army Special Forces selection and training since 1974, with central North Carolina representing Pineland.
- Aragon, an island located 600 miles east of Atlantica. The Republic of Cortina, a resource-rich U.S. ally in Aragon, is being covertly destabilized by the People's Democratic Republic of Acadia, prompting an American-led counterinsurgency. Also present is the Republic of Victoria. Cortina is the setting of JRTC exercises at "the Box", a 100,000-acre training ground in Louisiana.
- Attica, an unstable Middle Eastern country that is facing invasion threats by Ellisia, as well as Islamic terrorism by the Islamic Congress of Attica and the Islamic Brotherhood for Jihad, all of whom are aided by the eight-man cyberwarfare cell Wolf Brigade. OPFOR units in Attica were modeled after al-Qaeda, the Taliban, and Hezbollah, with the Wolf Brigade being based on Quds Force. Attica is the setting of the Network Integration Evaluation, a biannual military communications and hybrid warfare exercise at White Sands Missile Range in New Mexico.
- Atropia, a pro-Western Caucasus country with a sizeable U.S. military presence, but is also a corrupt and disagreeable autocracy. It is used in several exercises; in one scenario at the JRTC, Atopia is targeted by Ariana and its Arianan Special Purpose Forces, who support the South Atropian People's Army insurgency. Atropia is modeled after Azerbaijan and was introduced in 2012.
- Mojavia, a U.S. ally undergoing an insurgency by guerillas who primarily use hit-and-run tactics and avoid direct fights. Mojavia is also sometimes depicted as being attacked by Krasnovia. The Mojavian insurgents are modeled after the insurgencies of the Iraq War and War in Afghanistan, and serve as OPFOR against the United States Marine Corps at MCAGCC Twentynine Palms.
- Centralia, a country struggling with a civil war against the Centralian Revolutionary Force and external attacks by Montanya. The Centralian Revolutionary Force and Montanyan Regular Forces serve as OPFOR in exercises at The Basic School.
- The DATE World, a fictional world for U.S. military exercises modeled after the real world, featuring fictional countries with geopolitical situations that very closely mirror real equivalents.

Several state defense forces have served as OPFOR units when training with the National Guard. The California State Guard, the Georgia State Defense Force, and the New York Guard have provided OPFOR services to their respective National Guard counterparts. Joint exercises with foreign militaries also frequently involve them as OPFOR, such as the exercise Crocodile '03, which featured the Australian Army serving as OPFOR alongside a U.S. Marine Corps contingent.

==== Ranks ====
===== Officer ranks =====
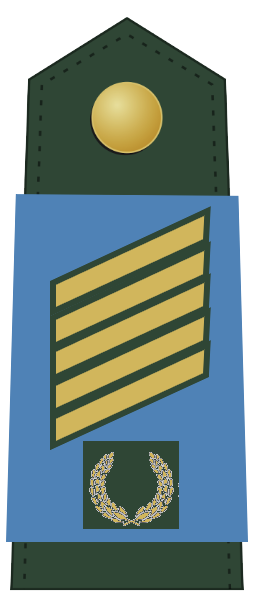
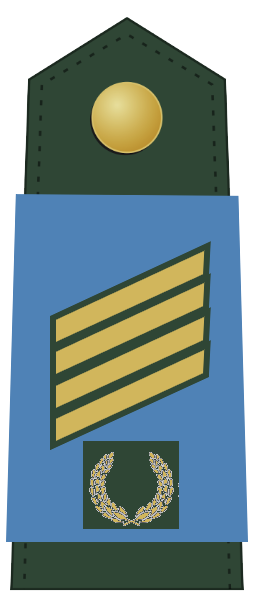
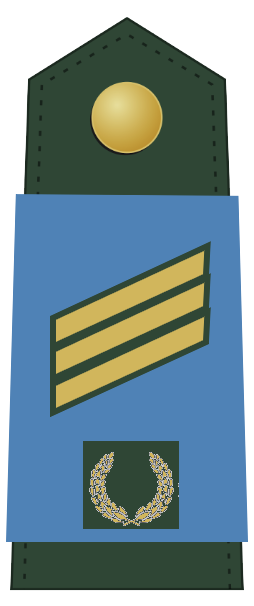
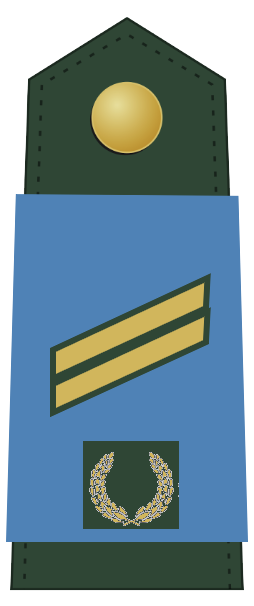
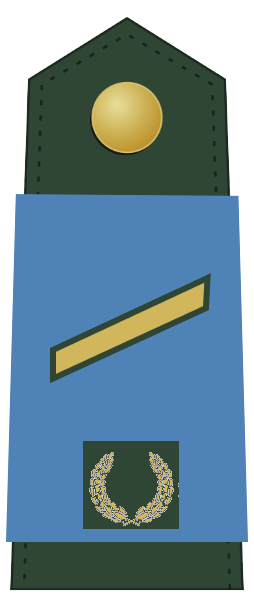
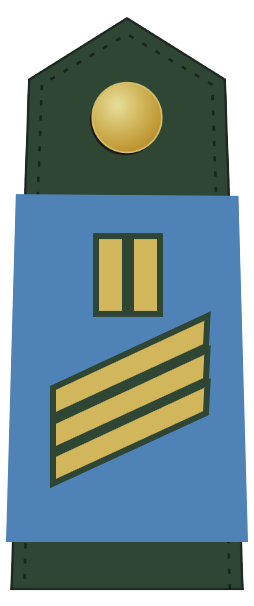
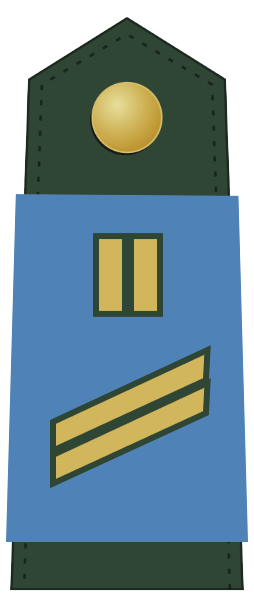
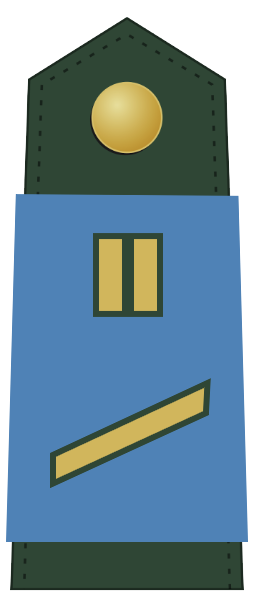
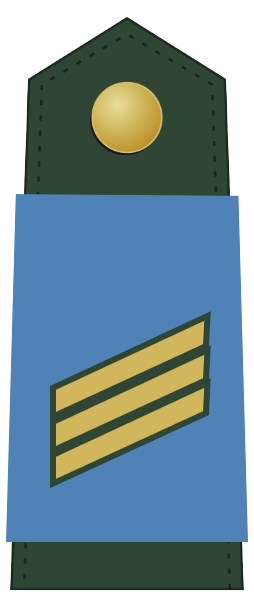
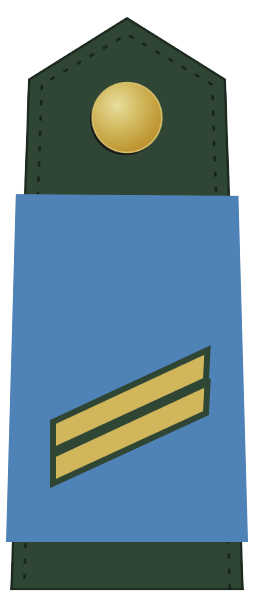
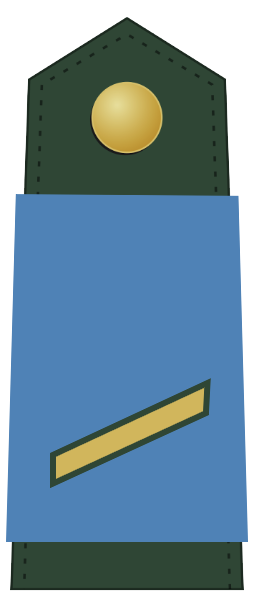
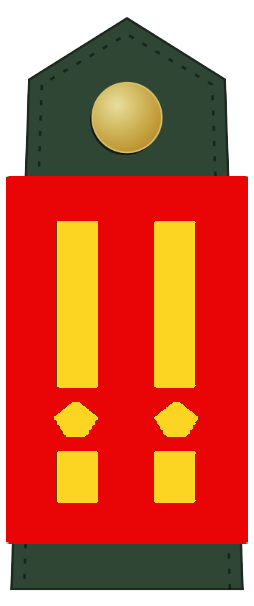
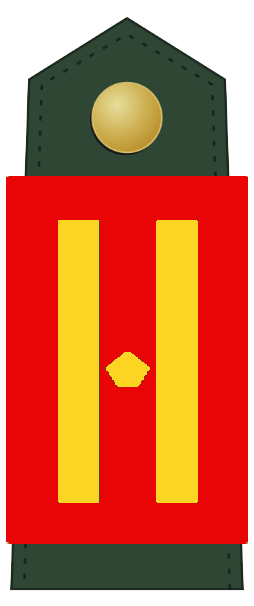
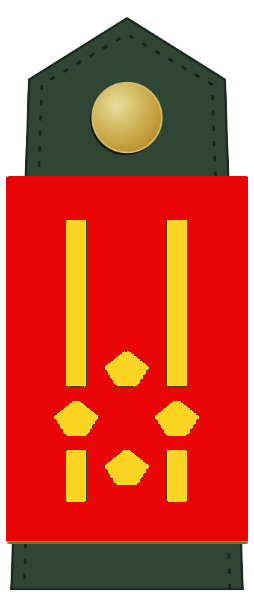
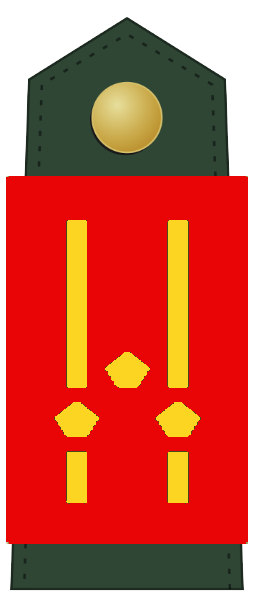
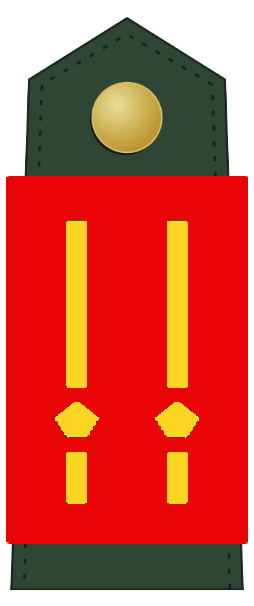
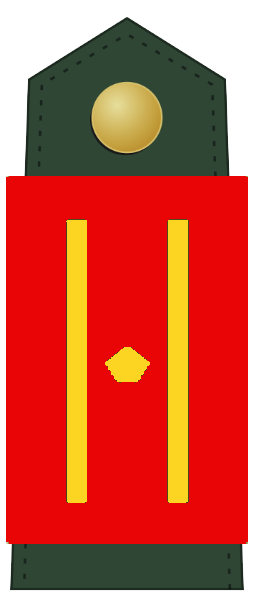
Rank group	General / flag officers					Senior officers			Junior officers
Circle Trigonists Army (1953–1962)
Circle Trigonists Army (1953–1962)	Marshal	General of army	General of corps	General of division	General of brigade	Colonel	Commandant	Major	Captain	Lieutenant	Sub-lieutenant	Warrant officer
Circle Trigonists Army (1962–1978)
Circle Trigonists Army (1962–1978)	Marshal	General of army	General of corps	General of division	General of brigade	Colonel	Commandant	Major	Captain	Lieutenant	Sub-lieutenant	Warrant officer
Krasnovian Army (1978–present)
Krasnovian Army (1978–present)						Colonel	Lieutenant colonel	Major	Captain	Lieutenant	Junior lieutenant
Rank group	General / flag officers					Senior officers			Junior officers
Circle Trigonists Air Force (1953–1962)
Circle Trigonists Air Force (1953–1962)	Air marshal	General of air	General of air army	General of air corps	General of air division	Colonel	Commandant	Major	Captain	Lieutenant	Sub-lieutenant	Warrant officer
Circle Trigonists Air Force (1962–1978)
Circle Trigonists Air Force (1962–1978)	Air marshal	General of air	General of air army	General of air corps	General of air division	Colonel	Commandant	Major	Captain	Lieutenant	Sub-lieutenant	Warrant officer

Circle Triagonist rank and collar tabs came in various colors - Red (rifle), White (artillery), Yellow (armor), Light Blue (airborne), Black (engineer), Tan (signal), Purple (chemical corps), Orange (propaganda)

===== Other ranks =====
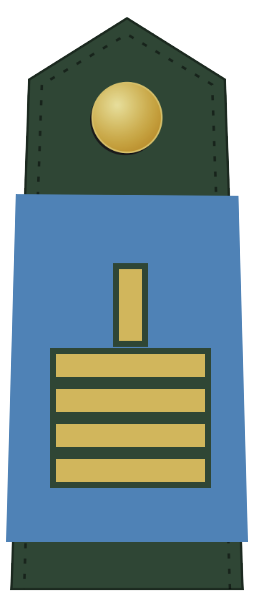
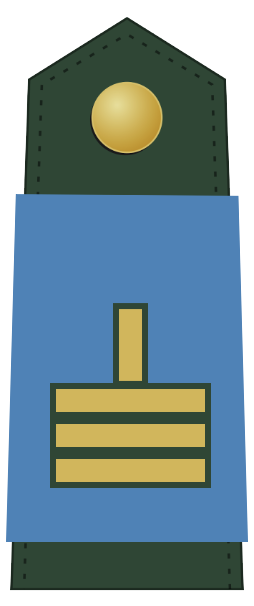
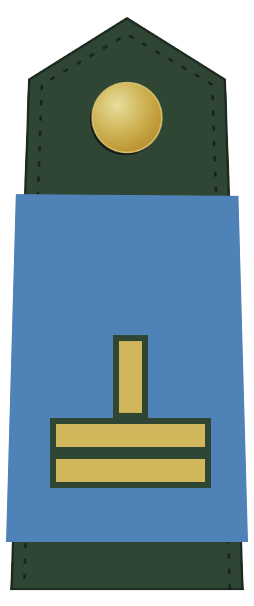
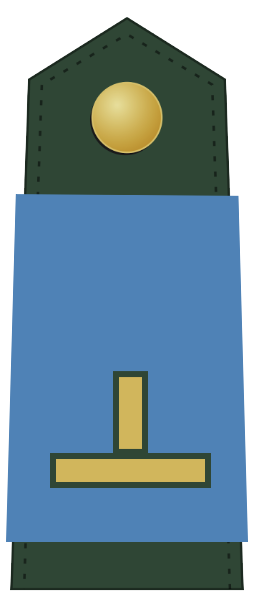
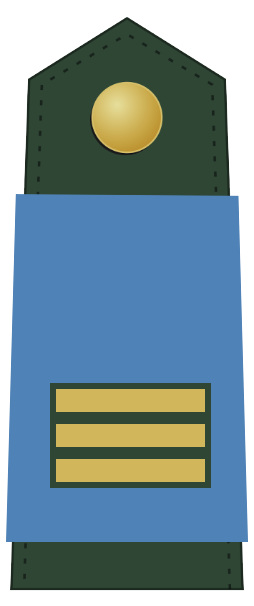
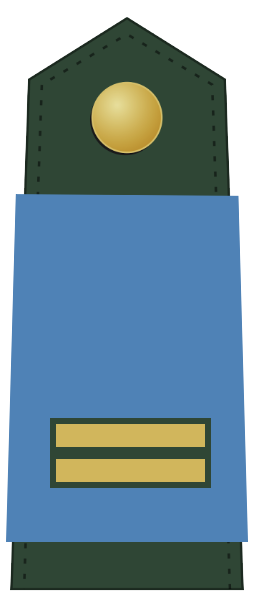
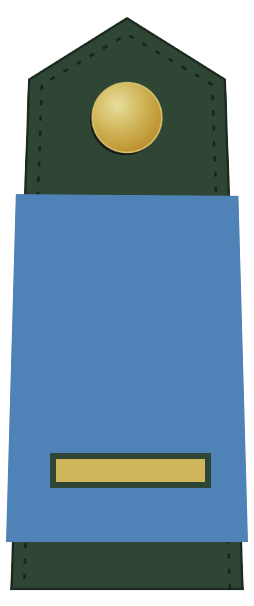
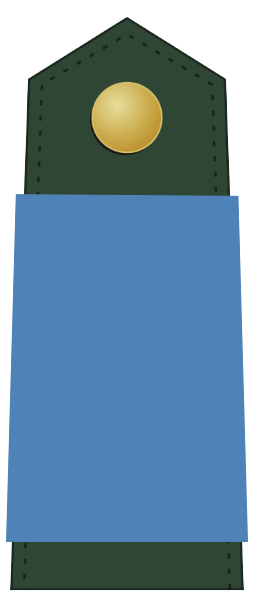
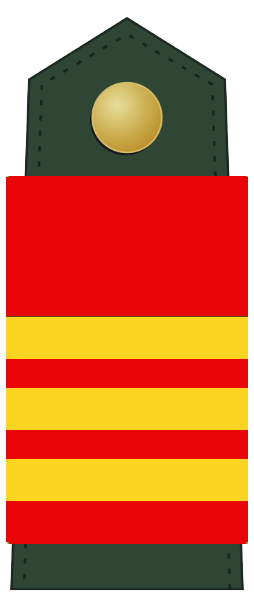
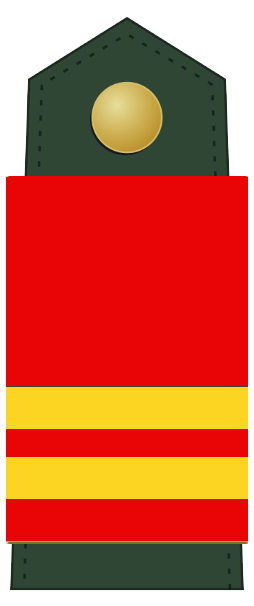
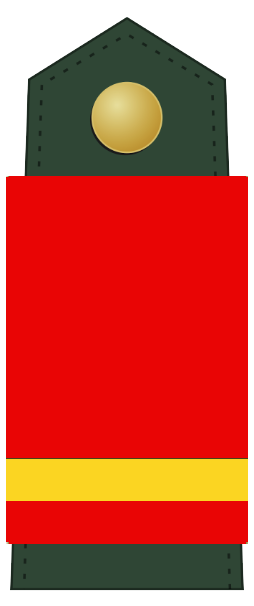
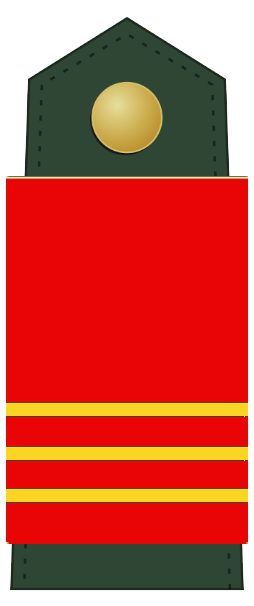
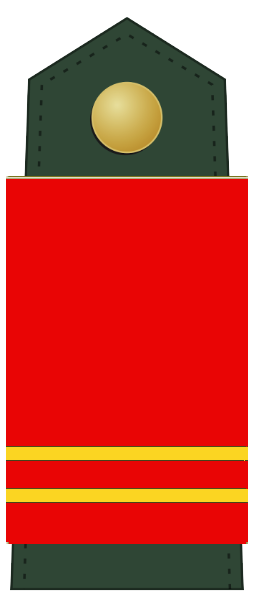
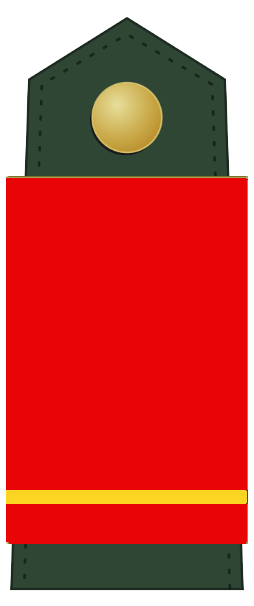
Rank group	Senior NCOs					Junior NCOs			Enlisted
Circle Trigonists Army (1953–1962)									No insignia
Circle Trigonists Army (1953–1962)	Sergeant major	Staff sergeant	Senior sergeant	Platoon sergeant	Section sergeant	Corporal		Senior private	Private
Circle Trigonists Army (1962–1978)
Circle Trigonists Army (1962–1978)	Sergeant major	Staff sergeant	Senior sergeant	Platoon sergeant	Section sergeant	Corporal		Senior private	Private
Krasnovian Army (1978–present)
Krasnovian Army (1978–present)	Sergeant major		Senior sergeant		Sergeant	Junior sergeant	Corporal		Private
Rank group	Senior NCOs					Junior NCOs			Enlisted
Circle Trigonists Air Force (1953–1962)									No insignia
Circle Trigonists Air Force (1953–1962)	Sergeant major	Staff sergeant	Senior sergeant	Platoon sergeant	Section sergeant	Corporal		Senior airman	Airman
Circle Trigonists Air Force (1962–1978)									No insignia
Circle Trigonists Air Force (1962–1978)	Sergeant major	Staff sergeant	Senior sergeant	Platoon sergeant	Section sergeant	Corporal		Senior airman	Airman

Often, the colour of the epaulette shows what specialisation the particular OPFOR soldier has. Green is worn by everyday soldiers, red by fusiliers, and blue by airborne forces.

== Gallery ==
=== Personnel ===
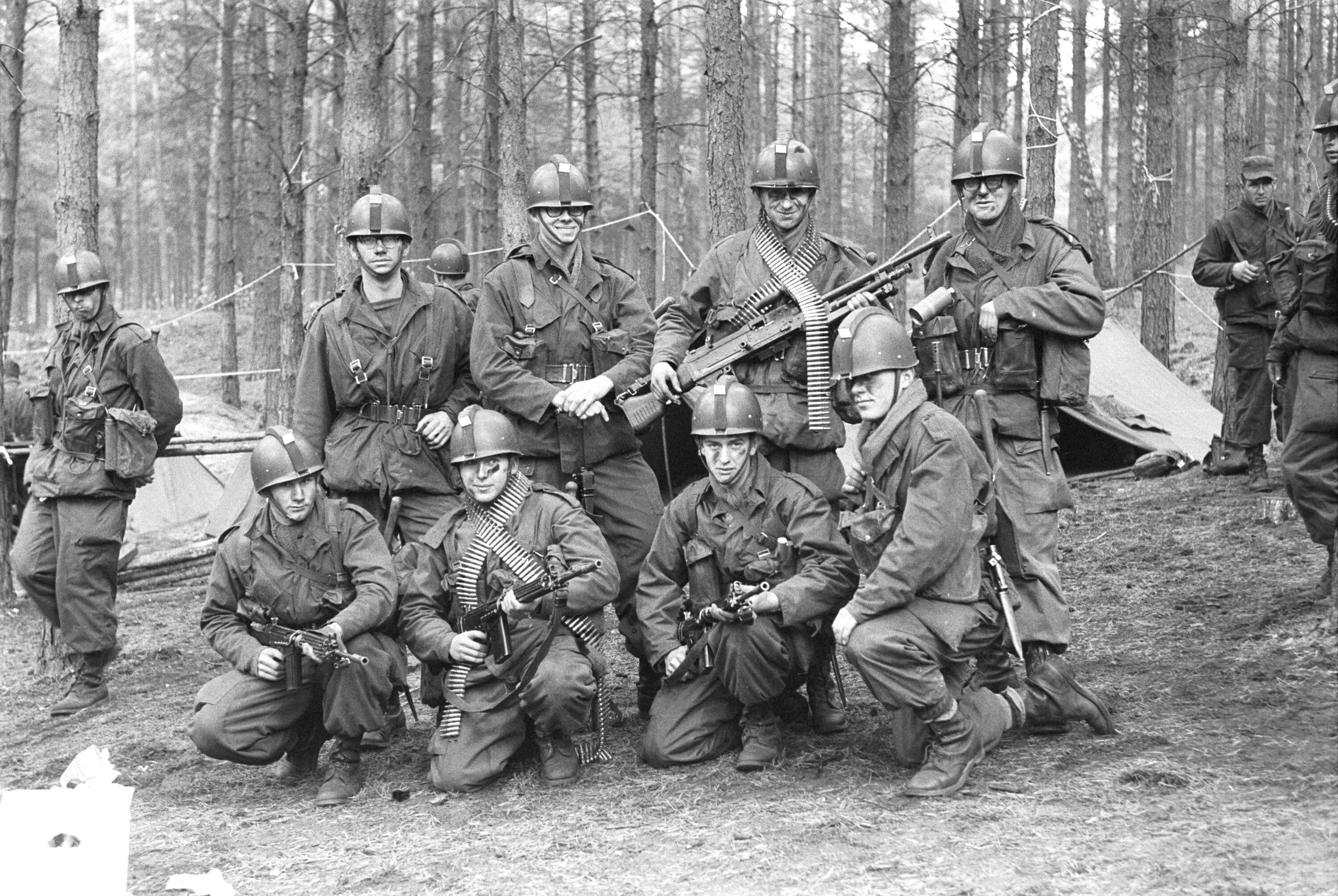
Dutch soldiers of 11 Pantserinfanteriebataljon Garderegiment Grenadiers wearing mohawk-style additions on their helmets to denote opposing force status.

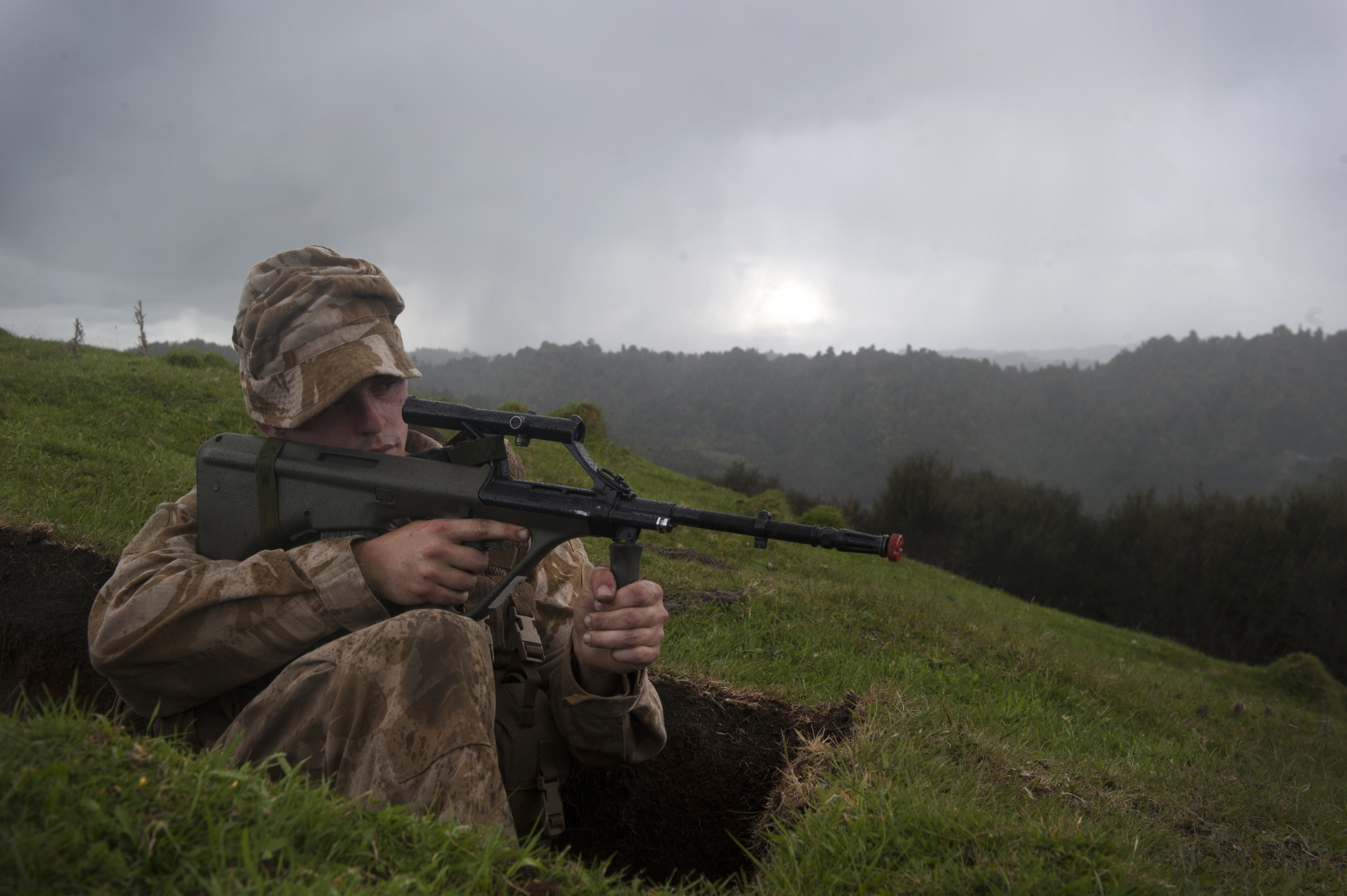
New Zealand Defence Force soldier denoting opposing force status by wearing Desert Disruptive Pattern Material (DPM) in a temperate environment.

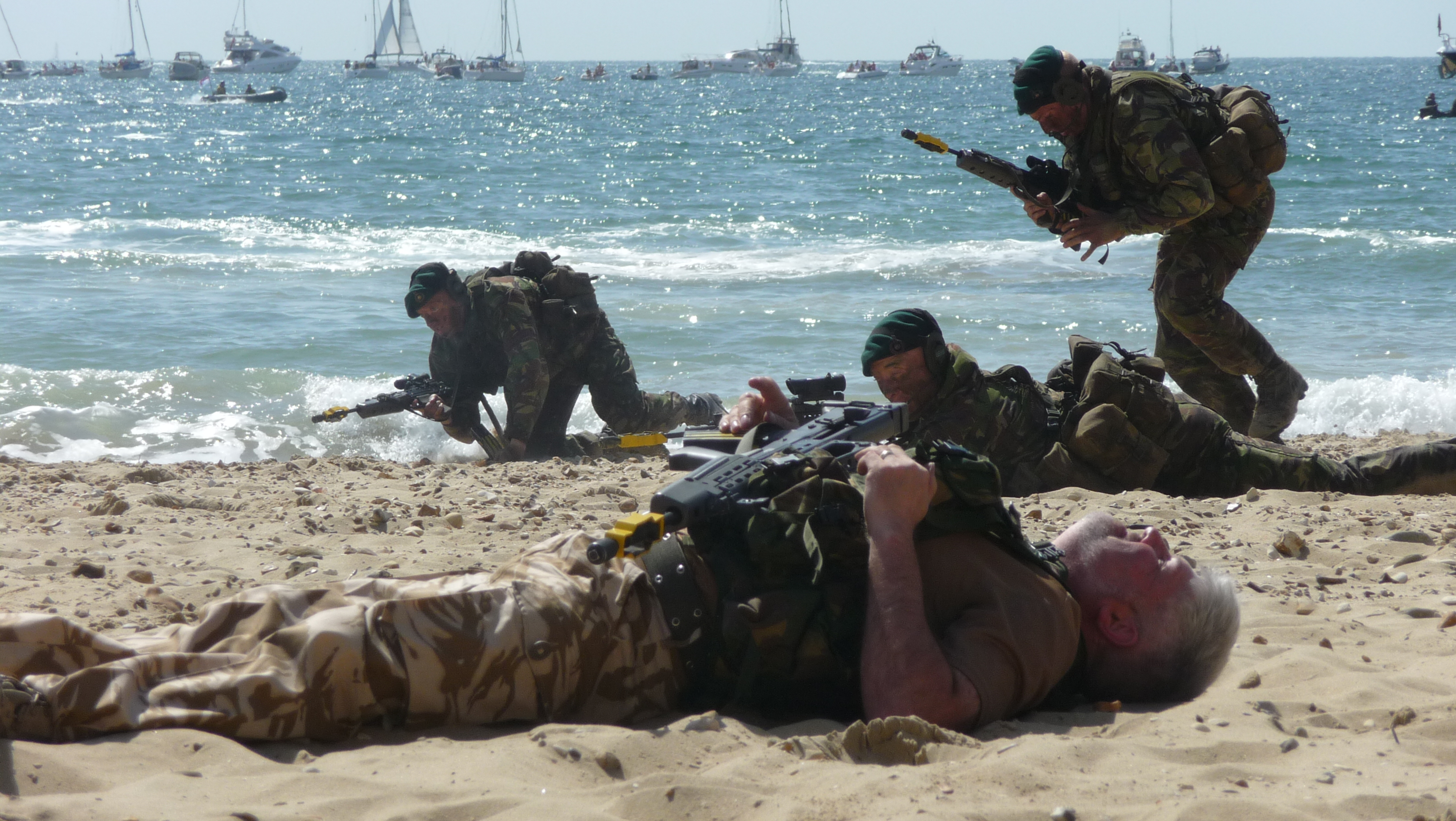
Scene from a simulated Royal Marines beach landing during the 2009 Bournemouth Air Festival; "opposing force" Marine is bareheaded and wears Desert DPM, "blue force" Marines in the background wear berets, camouflage face paint, and woodland DPM.

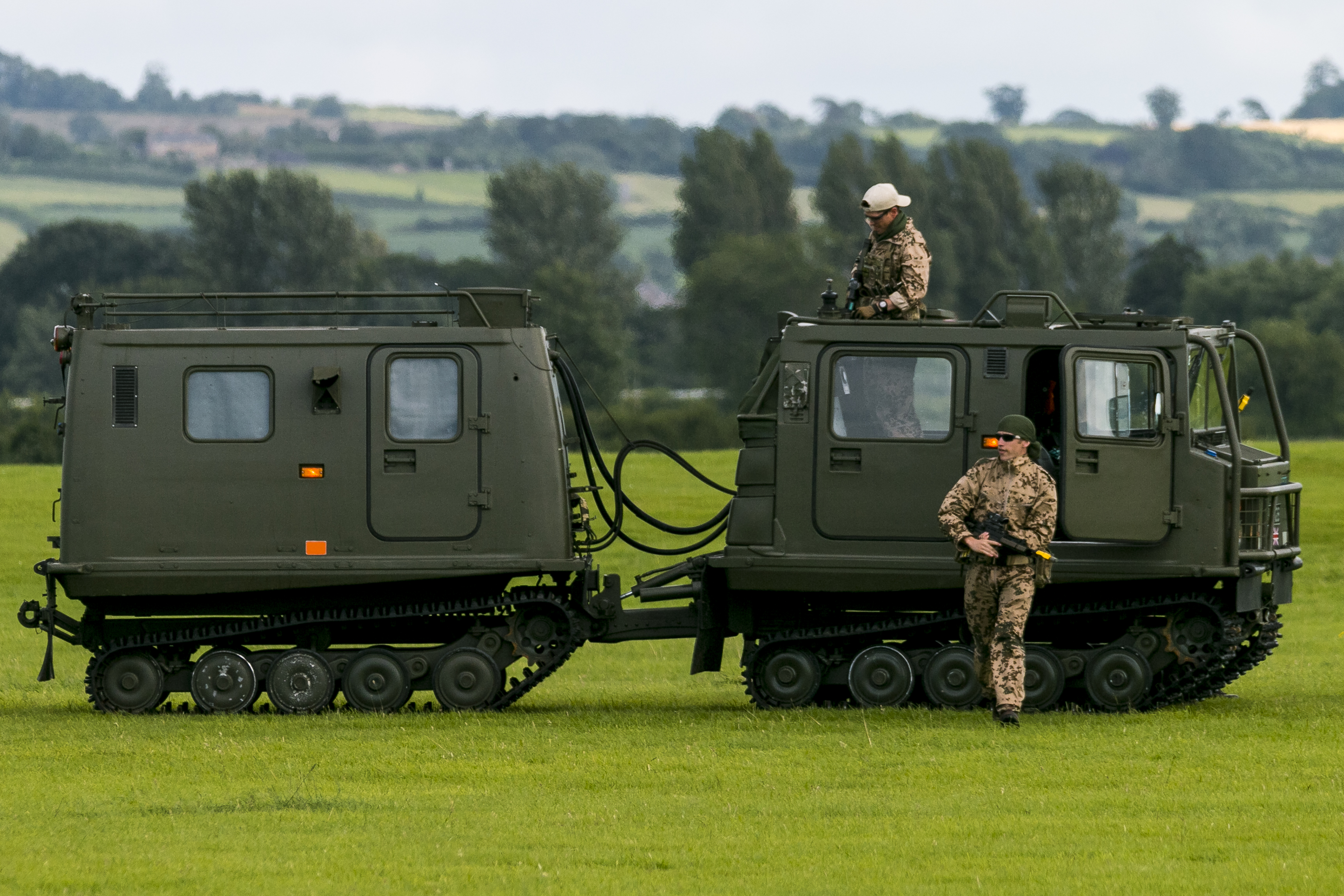
Royal Marine "opposing force" members during a 2016 assault demonstration; they wear Tropentarn uniforms and soft hats while the assaulting "blue force" Marines would be wearing MTP uniforms with Mk 7 helmets.

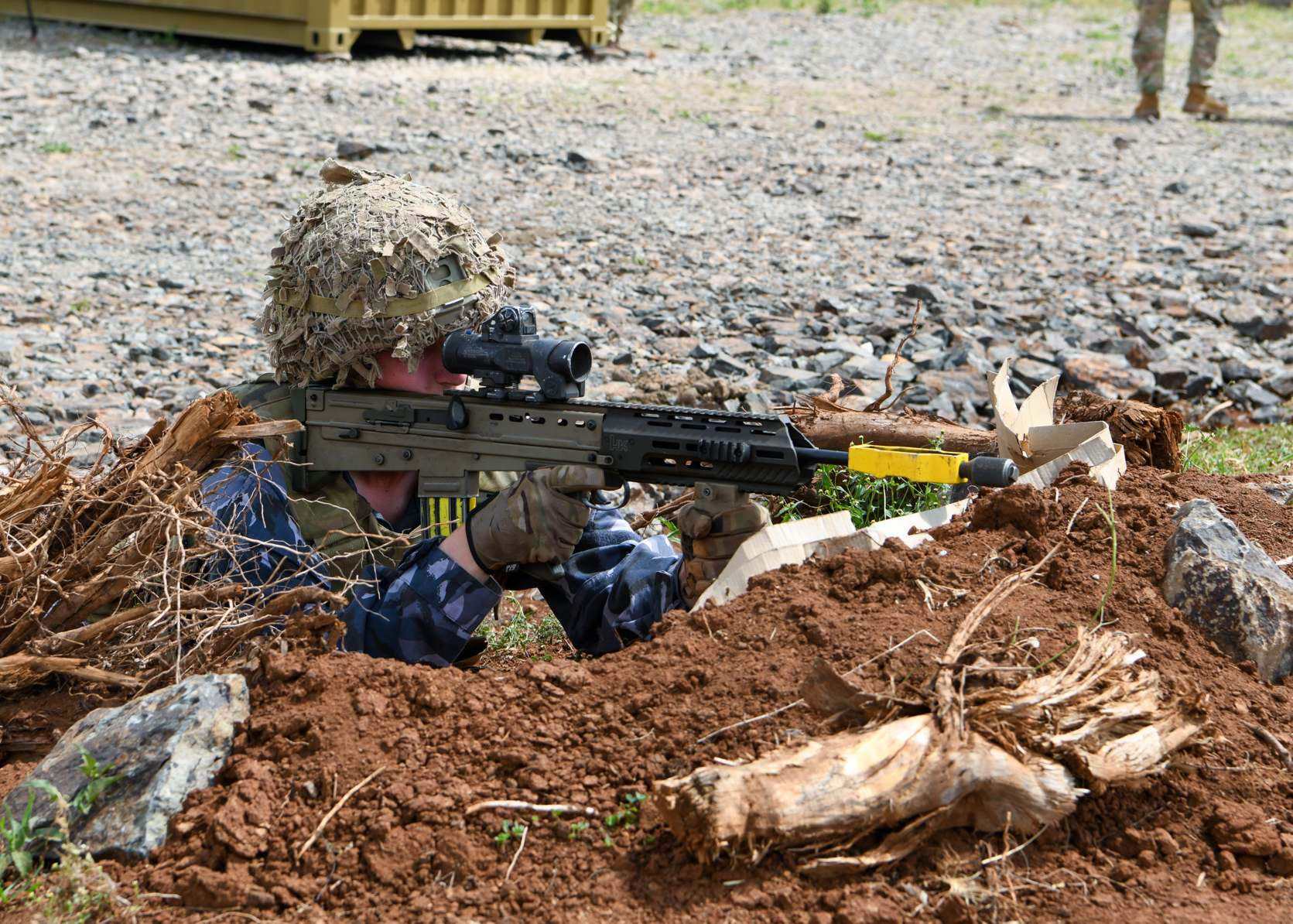
British Army soldier denoting opposing force status by wearing a blue-and-grey version of DPM (this version of the pattern being the only one to see continued use in British service).

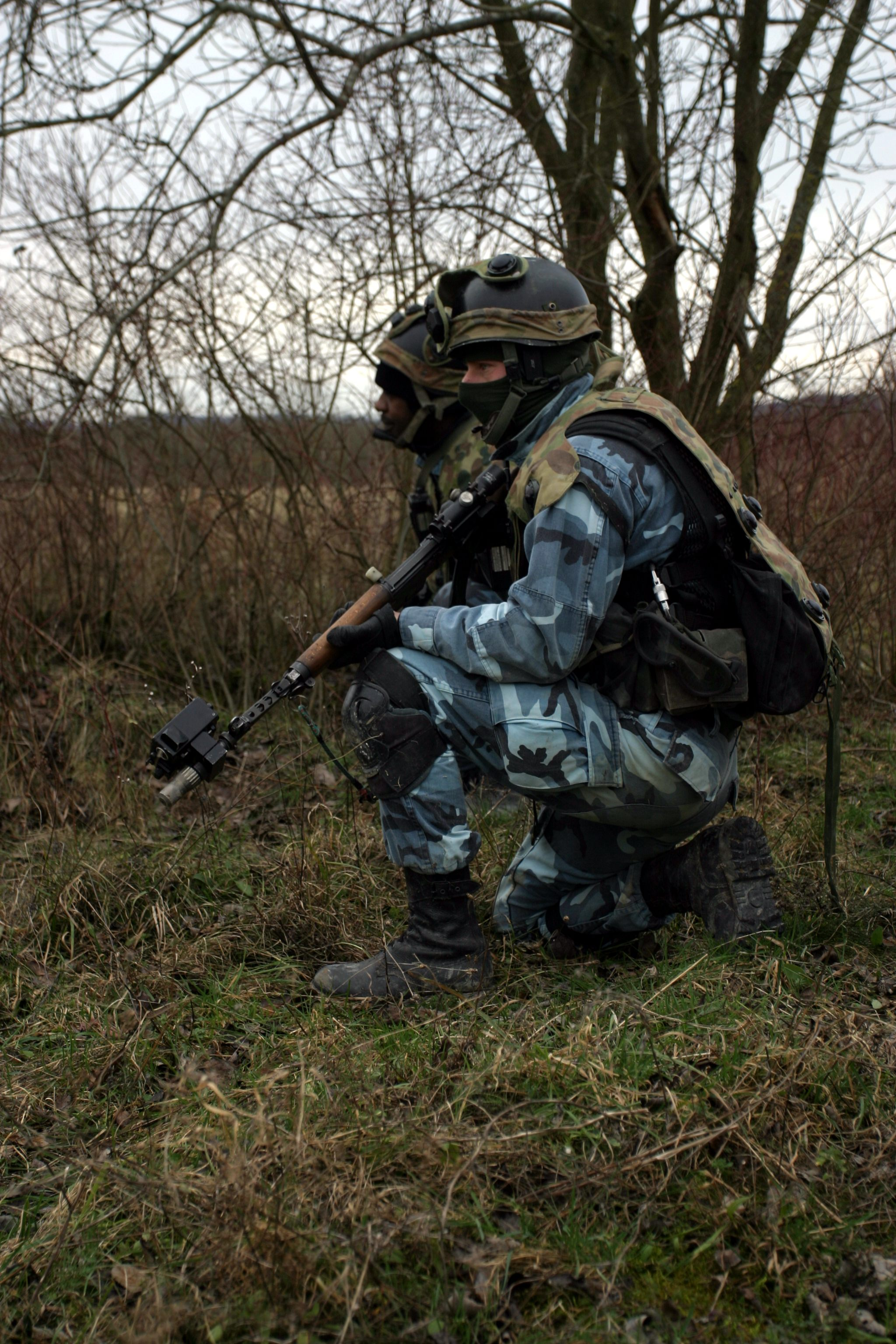
A sniper from the French CENZUB opposing force wearing a blue-and-gray version of Camouflage Central-Europe.

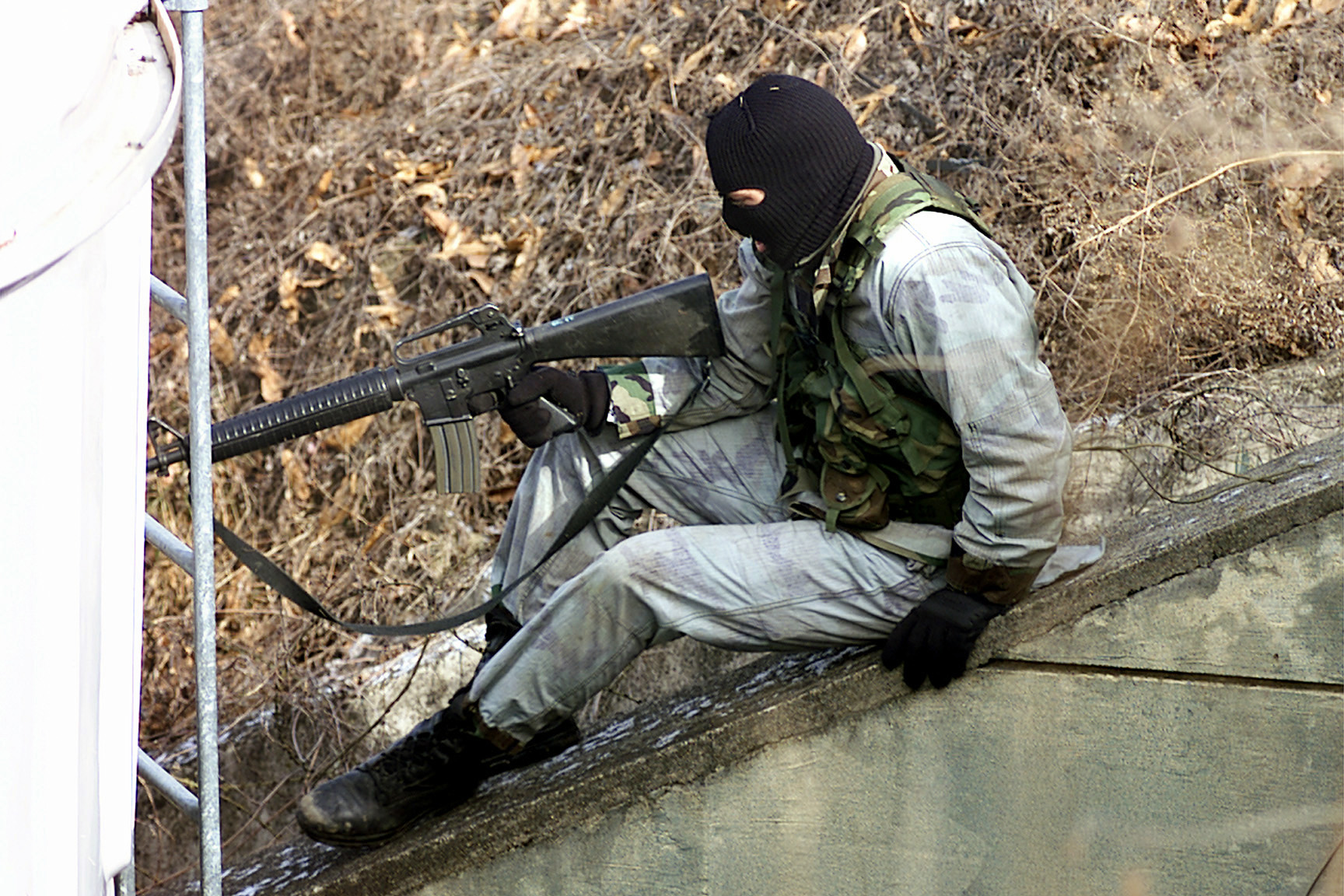
51st Fighter Wing airman denoting opposing force status by wearing his Battle Dress Uniform back to front (note the contrast of the uniform with the individual integrated fighting system vest that is also being worn).

4th Infantry Regiment soldiers wearing United States Army opposing force uniform (Battle Dress Uniform in black with olive 'OPFOR' shoulder title)

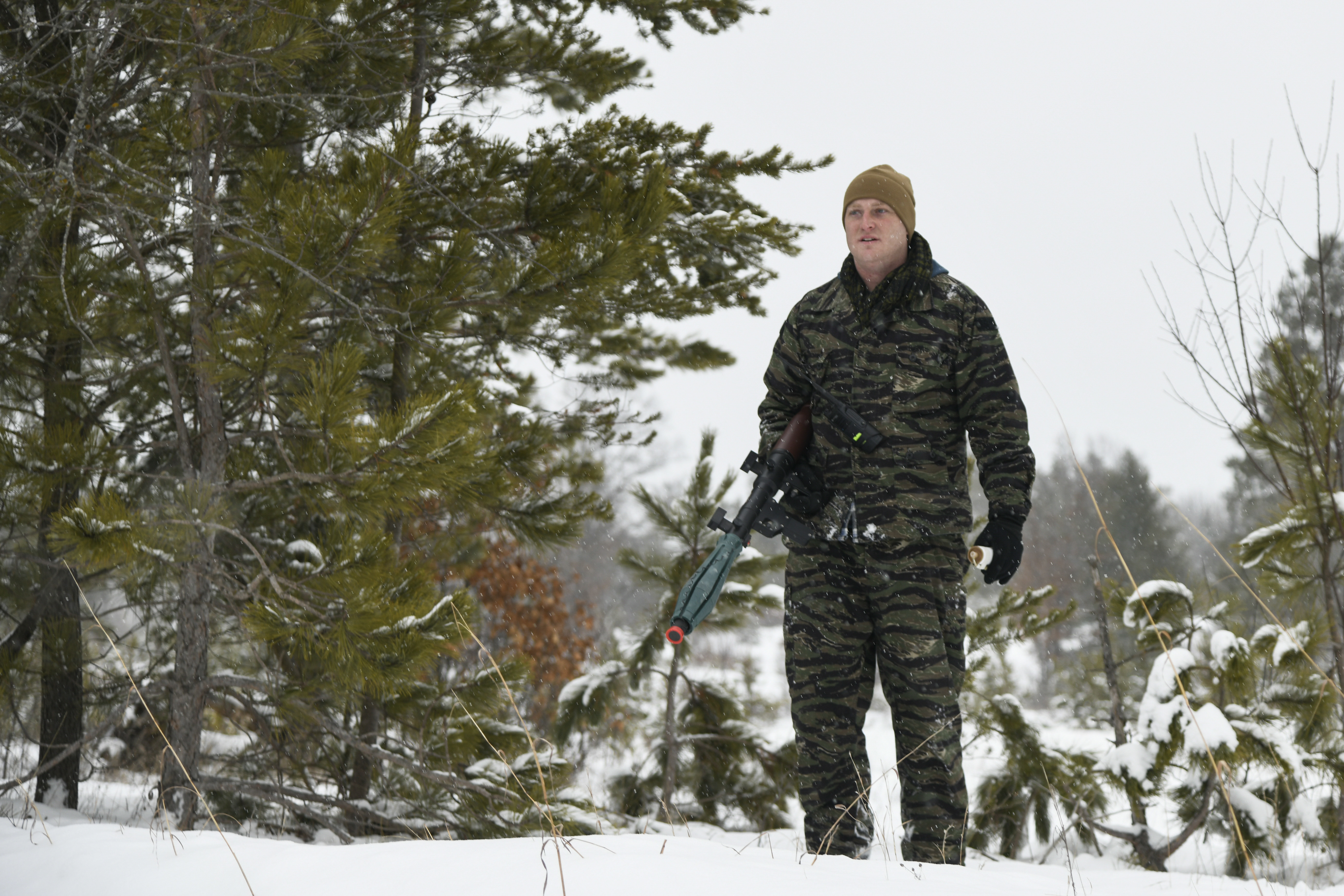
Michigan National Guard OPFOR wearing tiger stripe camouflage uniform and carrying a simulated RPG-7.

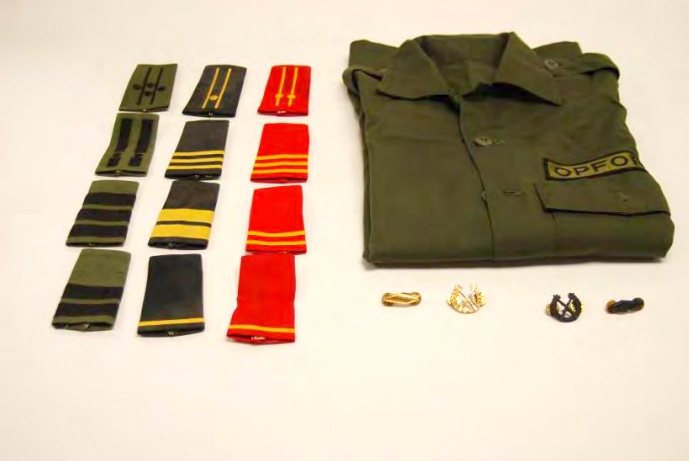
OPFOR rank insignia mimicking the Soviet style (used during the Cold War)

=== Vehicles ===
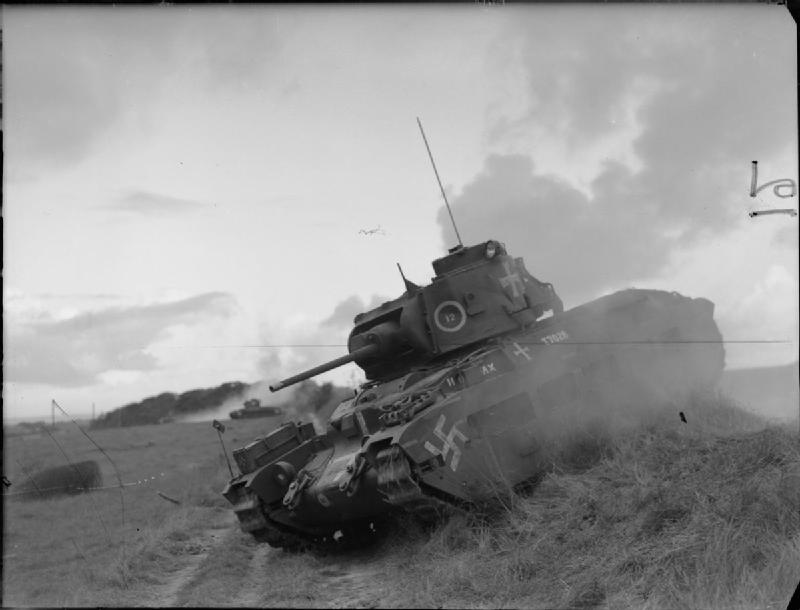
49th Royal Tank Regiment Matilda II with swastika and Iron Cross markings to denote opposing force status during a 1941 exercise in Dover.

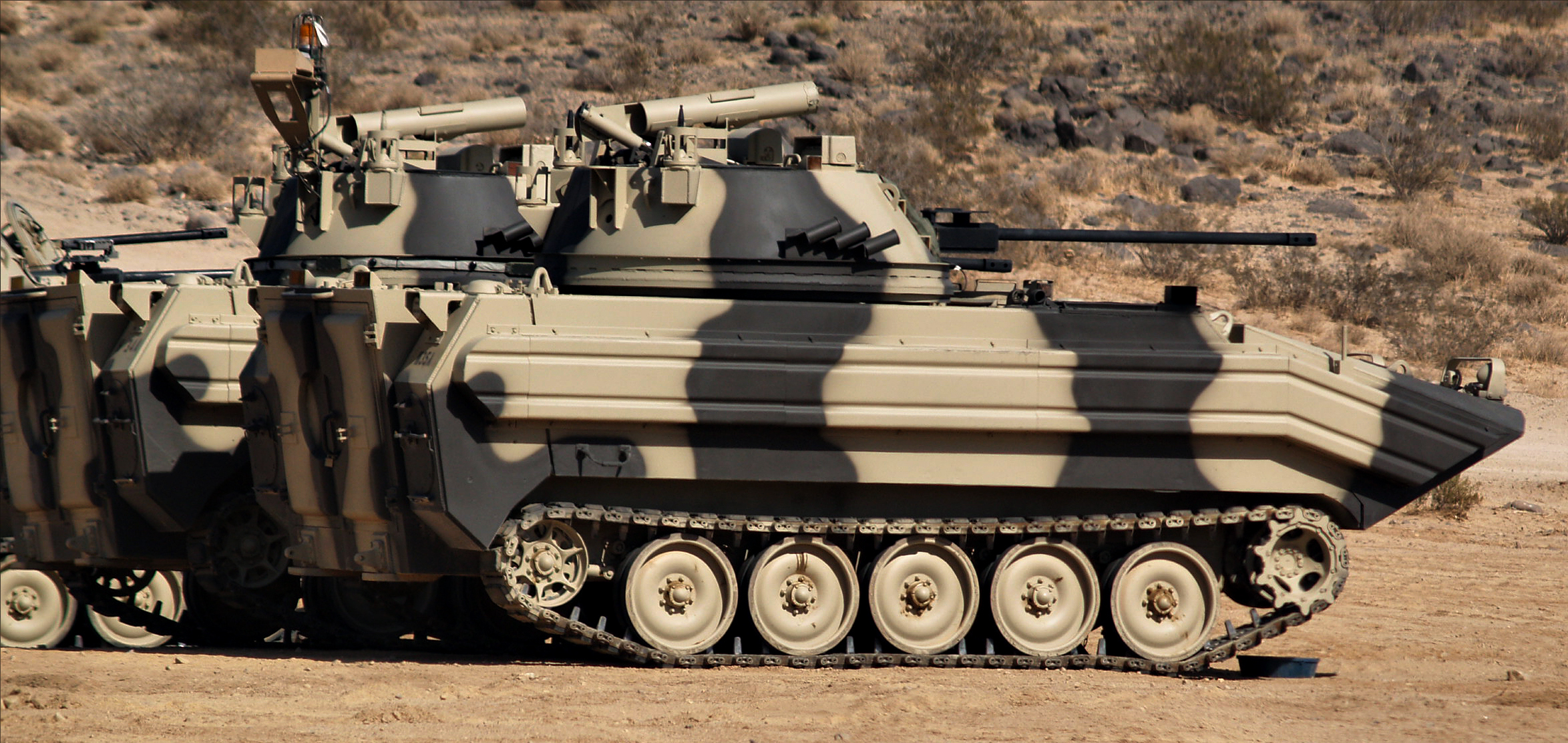
An OSV, visually modified M113 APC replicating a Soviet BMP at NTC, Fort Irwin, CA

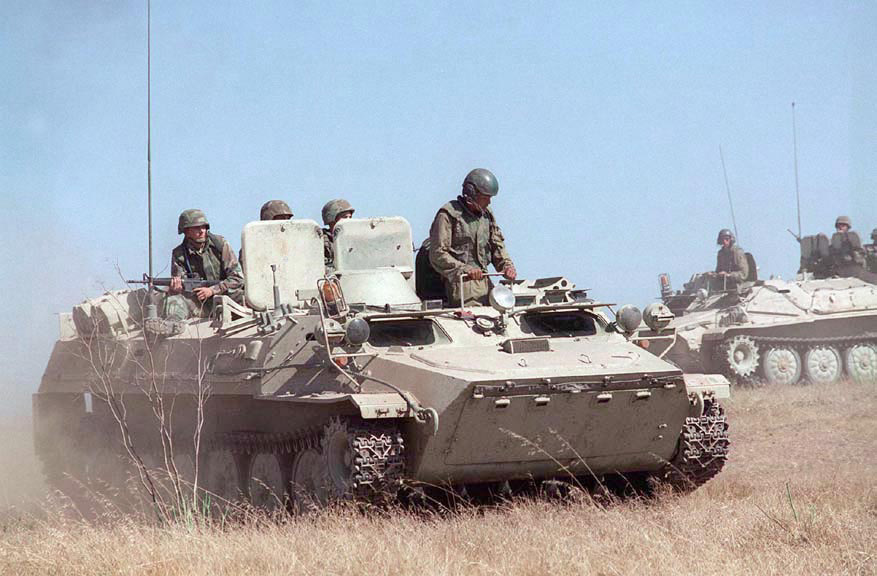
US Marines using a former Soviet MT-LB vehicle as part of the OPFOR during an exercise

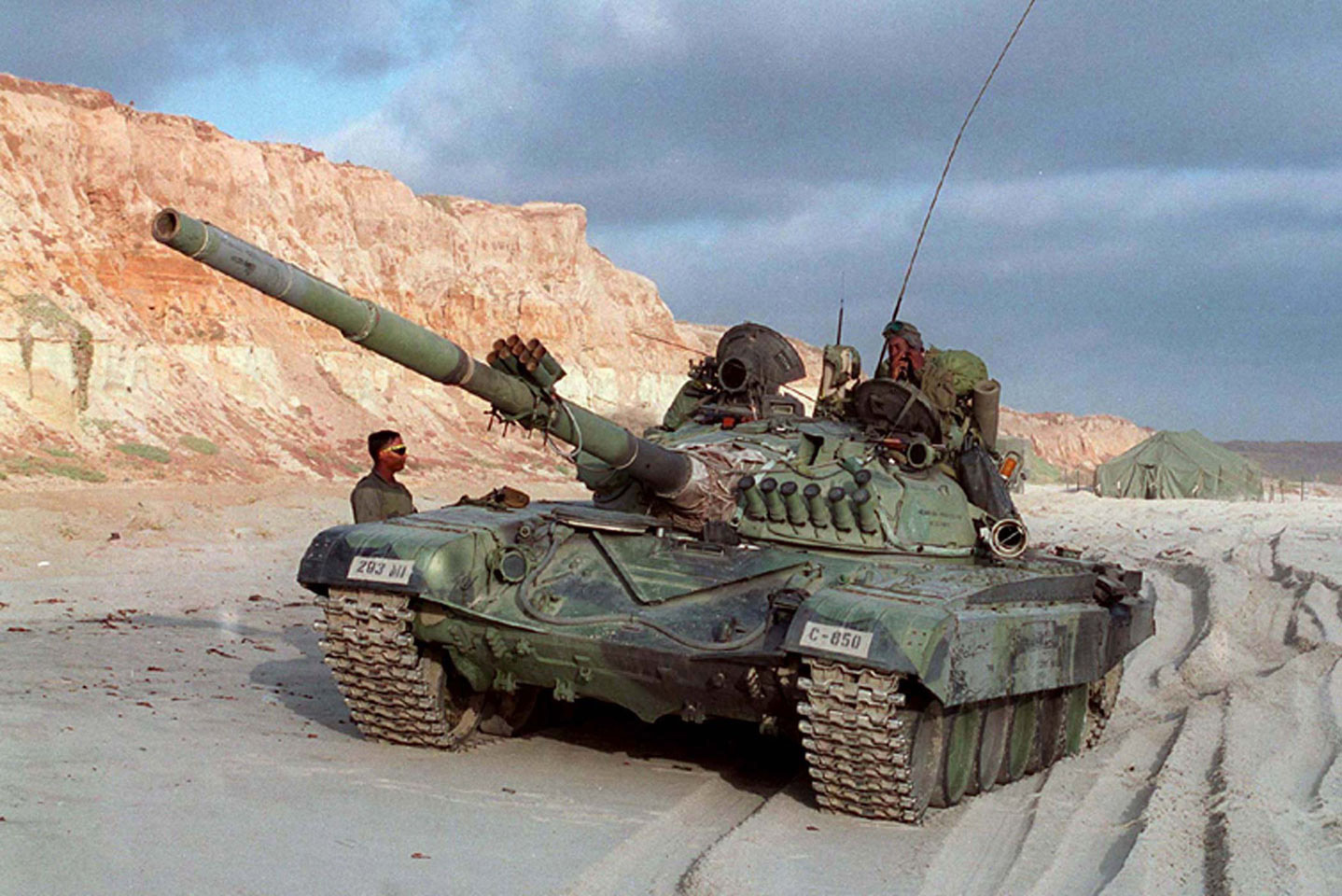
T-72M1 used by the 3rd Amphibious Assault Battalion, 1st Marine Division of US Marines at Camp Pendleton during Kernel Blitz 1997 exercise

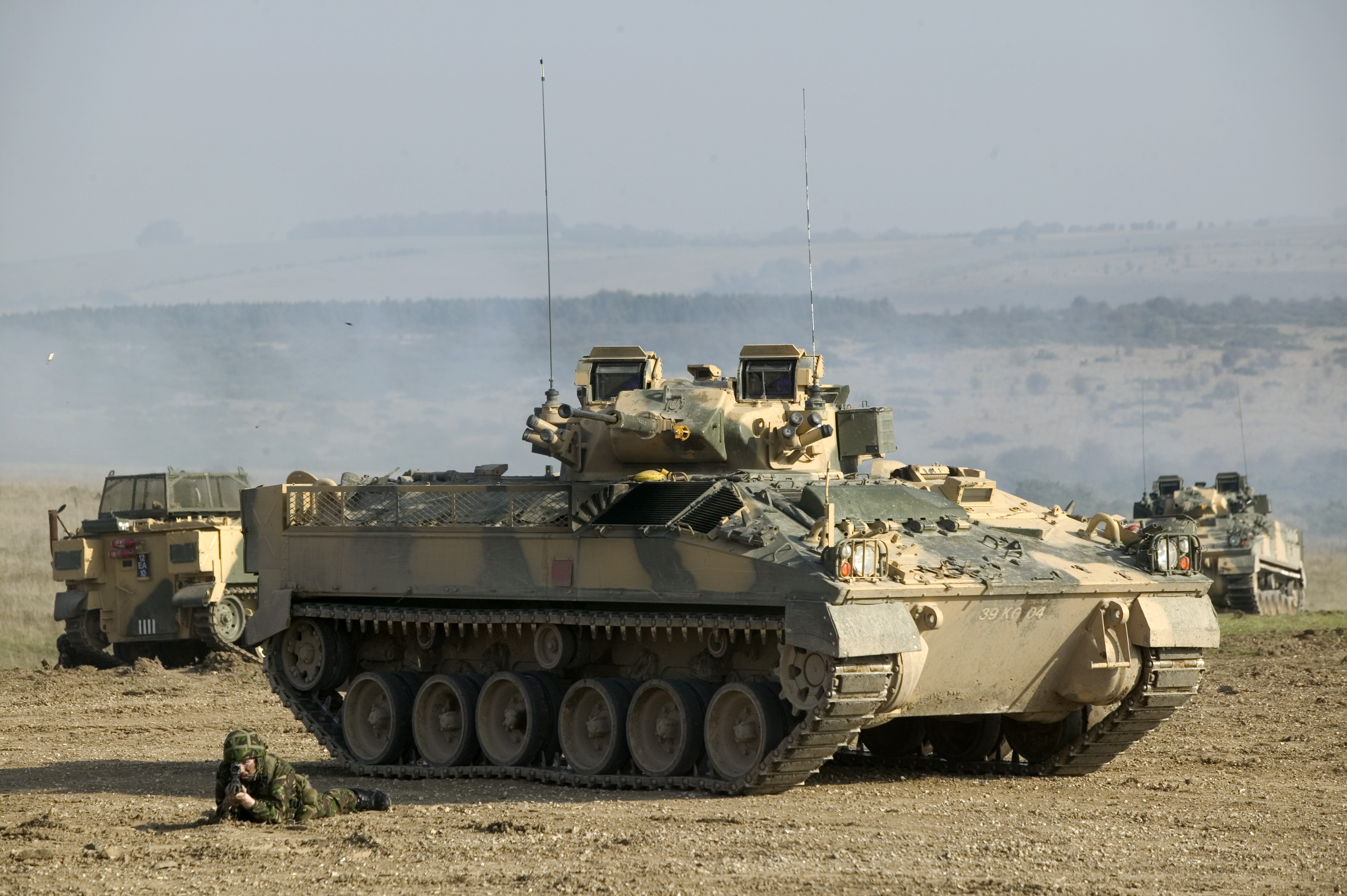
FV510 Warrior and other British vehicles in a green-and-tan paint scheme; while normally associated with BATUS, the paint scheme denotes opposing force status if used on the British mainland (as in this photograph).
