= Atropia =

Atropia may refer to:

- Atropia (fictional country), a fictional nation used by the United States Army for training exercises.
- Atropia (film), is a romantic dramedy based on the concept of the real fictional country of Atropia.
