= DATE World =

Fictional world used for US Army training

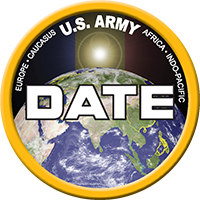
Logo for DATE World used by the U.S. Army (Note: The Australian Defence Force uses a different logo on its website.)

The Decisive Action Training Environment, or DATE World, is a fictional universe created by the U.S. Army to serve as a medium for training the U.S. Military and its allies. It is an alternate history of Earth with a similar, but distinctly different political geography. Certain areas of the world are nearly identical to real life, while others contain entirely made-up countries, each with its own detailed political, social, economic, and military structures. The reason for maintaining a complex fictional universe is said to be that "real-world countries cannot be an adversarial country".

== Purpose and usage ==
DATE World is developed and maintained by the United States Army Transformation and Training Command (T2COM) for use by the United States Armed Forces and allied countries. Individual training centers are permitted to create their own modifications to the setting, though these changes are not necessarily adopted into the official DATE World. Details on the official version of the setting are publicly accessible online through the Operational Environment Data Integration Network (ODIN) website.

According to the Army University Press, the Australian Defence Force's usage of DATE World is actually more prolific than the United States Armed Forces, followed by the New Zealand Defence Force.

The U.S. Army Simulation and Training Technology Center has also developed MOSES, an open-source piece of software based on OpenSimulator. Among other things, the program is used to run virtual simulations inside DATE World.

=== Robin Sage ===
The U.S. Army Special Forces Qualification Course includes a standardised exercise nicknamed Robin Sage. The exercise, held annually, sees students airdropping into the fictitious country of Pineland, located in real-world North Carolina. The aim of the exercise is to role-play with "local guerrilla fighters" to simulate the destabilisation and overthrow of the government. Held eight times per year, thousands of locals and U.S. military personnel play various roles in the simulation. They are also trained on how to interact with the media, being approached by the fictitious International News Network (or INN).

== In-universe geography ==
While most of DATE World is portrayed the same as real life, certain regions are modified to include entirely fictitious countries (called operational environments, or OEs). While some OEs may appear analogous to real-world nations, they are deliberately designed to present challenges in training scenarios that differ from what may be expected in their real life-counterparts.

=== Official TRADOC version ===
The official setting of DATE World, as maintained by T2COM, primarily centers around four distinct global regions: Eurasia, (Note: DATE Eurasia, also called DATE Caucasia, focuses on eastern Europe, northern Asia, and the Caucasus.) the Indo-Pacific, Europe, (Note: DATE Europe focuses on eastern Europe and Scandinavia) and Africa. (Note: DATE Africa focuses on eastern Africa) These regions collectively contain twenty-nine OEs:

- Eurasia: Ariana, Atropia, Donovia, Gorgas, Limaria, Pirtuni
- Indo-Pacific: Bagansait, Belesia, Gabal, Himaldesh, Khorathidin, North Torbia, Olvana, Patani Baru, the Puller Islands, South Torbia, Sunda Baru, Sungzon, Volcani Tura
- Europe: Arnland, Bothnia, Framland, Otso, Torrike, Donovia
- Africa: Amari, Nyumba, Kujenga, Ziwa

The Republic of Atropia is described as a corrupt pro-western dictatorship offering few civil liberties to its citizens. Because of its natural resources, such as oil and gas, it is a U.S. interest. Its fictional borders roughly overlap with the real-world Republic of Azerbaijan. It is frequently portrayed in conflict with the neighbouring Donovia. The Joint Readiness Training Center at Fort Polk, Louisiana contains twelve villages inside an area known as The Box, that represent Atropia. The buildings inside are designed in traditional Azerbaijani architecture to add realism to the simulation. Atropia has also been simulated at Fort Bragg, North Carolina; Fort Irwin, California; the Combat Maneuver Training Center in Hohenfels, Bavaria; and in the virtual MOSES project.

The Republic of Arnland is a democratic republic described as prioritizing its own independence. It is among the three OEs that altogether roughly share the borders of the real-world Kingdom of Sweden. (Note: The others are Framland and Torrike.) Most notably is its depiction by the French Armed Forces, which also introduced the OE of Mercure. (Note: Mercure is the French word for mercury.)

The United Republics of Donovia (Note: previously called Donovia-West) is described as a republic under an oligarchical dictatorship. Its borders roughly overlap with the real-world Russian Federation. Donovia has also been simulated at Fort Irwin, California; and the Joint Multinational Readiness Center in Hohenfels, Bavaria.

The Democratic People's Republic of Torbia, known as North Torbia, is a single-party socialist state described as despotic, totalitarian, and reliant on a cult of personality. South Torbia is a republic described as one of the world's most wealthy and powerful countries. Its democratic structure is weak however, and corruption is a persistent issue. Both OEs collectively overlap roughly with the real-world Republic of the Philippines. Scenarios within these OEs ranging from minor insurgencies to full-scale invasions have been simulated at Fort Polk, Louisiana; the Yakima Training Center in Washington State; and the North Vernon Municipal Airport's Contingency Operating Base Panther, an annex of Camp Atterbury-Muscatatuck. These simulations often involve North Torbia invading the South. The Australian Defence Force and the New Zealand Defence Force have also run their own Torbian simulations.

The People's Republic of Olvana is described as a communist nation. Its borders very roughly correspond to the East and South Central statistical regions of the real-world People's Republic of China. Exercise Talisman Sabre 2025, held in the real-world Commonwealth of Australia, (Note: Talisman Sabre was held, specifically, in the State of Queensland.) involved twenty-two real-world countries training by "invading" Olvana.

=== Robin Sage ===
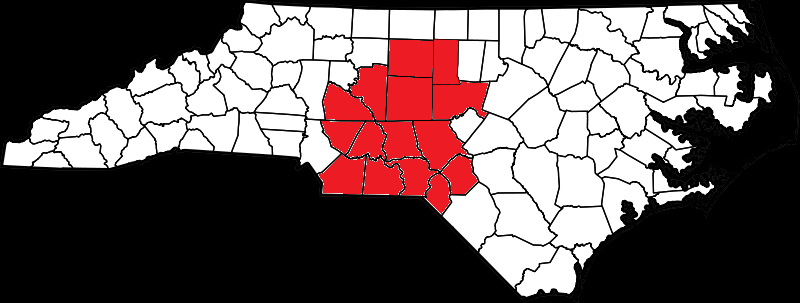
the Robin Sage training grounds (and metaphorical location of Pineland) in North Carolina, highlighted in red

The John F. Kennedy Special Warfare Center and School maintains an OE called the People's Republic of Pineland as the setting for the standardized training exercise Robin Sage. The OE is canonically located in the mid-Atlantic continent of Atlantica, though the real-world training ground is made up of ten to fifteen counties in North Carolina.

In its fictional lore, Pineland is a long-time ally of the United States. Amid the recent spread of communism throughout the region, the government has recently fallen under the control of a strongman, Jose Cuervo. (Note: The name Jose Cuervo is a joke, in reference to the tequilla brand of the same name.) Through the use of democratic backsliding, Cuervo recently carried out a coup d'état by declaring martial law, and imprisoning his political rival, Pineland Secretary of Defence Robin Hayes.

The other OEs in mainland Atlantica are the United Provinces of Atlantica (Note: previously North Atlantica) and Appalachia. In past exercises during the Cold War, they were said to be allied with the Soviet Union. Six hundred miles east is the island of Aragon, consisting of three OEs: the People's Democratic Republic of Acadia, the Republic of Cortina, and the Republic of Victoria.

=== Additional OEs ===
Fort Irwin, California operated a number of its own OEs from 1981 through 1997 that are not officially part of DATE World. Set on the fictional island of Tierra Del Diablo: the People's Democratic Republic of Krasnovia, described as an Eastern Bloc or Warsaw Pact country hostile to the U.S.; the Kingdom of Parumphia, an ally of Krasnovia; and the Republic of the Mojave, (Note: or Mojavia) a U.S. Ally. The exercise typically sees the U.S. defending Mojavia from a Krasnovian invasion. Krasnovia is described as using tactics akin to the real-world Russian Federation, "plus one". Mojavia is also simulated at 29 Palms, California, but as an adversary instead of an ally. Krasnovian civil war is topic of discussion in the book Nonstate Warfare: The Military Methods of Guerillas, Warlords, and Militias by Stephen Biddle.

The Joint Readiness Training Center also has some of its own OEs, simulated in The Box. On the fictional island of Aragon, 2123 nautical miles east of the U.S., are the Republic of Cortina, a U.S. ally; the Republic of Victoria; and the People's Democratic Republic of Atlantica, seemingly unrelated to the Robin Sage Atlantica.

MCB Quantico runs exercises in an OE called Centralia. In some iterations, the trainees are tasked with observing geopolitical activities without intervening. In another iteration, the country is three years into a civil war, and the U.S. is fighting against the insurgent Centralian Revolutionary Force and "neighbouring country" of Montanya.

The U.S. Department of State maintains an OE for training the Foreign Service — the Republic of Z. Set on the east coast of the fictional southern Pacific island of Zyxia, it is bordered by two other OEs: the Republic of X and the Republic of Y. Despite not being classified, little is publicly known of the Zyxian OEs.

The U.S. Joint Modernization Command's Network Integration Evaluation includes two middle-eastern OEs — Attica, a U.S. ally; and Ellisia, which is invading Attica. This exercise is performed at the White Sands Missile Range in New Mexico, and Fort Bliss, Texas.

== Real-world history and effects ==
The United States has a history of creating fake countries for military training. The 1941 Louisiana Maneuvers included the fictitious countries of Kotmk, (Note: an abbreviation of Kansas, Oklahoma, Texas, Missouri, Kentucky) and Almat. (Note: an abbreviation of Arkansas, Louisiana, Mississippi, Alabama, Tennessee) Having started in 1974, Robin Sage actually predates DATE World as a whole. It used to be called Erehwon, the word nowhere spelled backward. The aforementioned Republic of Z also dates back to the mid-1970s.

In 2002, three people participating in a Robin Sage exercise, two students on the "invading" side and a local paid to role-play as a supporter, were pulled over by local law enforcement. Believing the Deputy Sheriff to be in on the simulation, the students attempted to bribe him with Pineland Don, the fictional nation's currency. The details of what followed are contested, but it ended with both students being shot, one dying, and the two others getting arrested. Following this incident, law officers participating in the simulation are instructed to wear insignia identifying them as such.

After the dissolution of the Soviet Union in 1991, the U.S. army's priorities shifted away from the Cold War towards regional counterinsurgency operations. For that reason, circa 2010, TRADOC G-2 was tasked with developing a training scenario to reflect these changes. What they came up with was the Full Spectrum Training Environment (FSTE), a precursor to DATE. It included five OEs: Ariana, Atropia, Gorgas, and Minaria. DATE World as a whole was first published in 2012. All members of the international ABCANZ Armies program soon adopted DATE World for training scenarios, all agreeing to memorandums of understanding (MoU) with TRADOC.

In 2018, it was expanded to include the multiple theaters that it now has today.

In 2018, as part of a UN military mission to "liberate Atropia", the Canadian military's headquarters staff at CFB Edmonton trained directing troops on a computer simulation.

In 2023, the French Armed Forces held Exercise Orion 23, a NATO-wide training operation. This exercise involved "defending Arnland" from invasion by an OE called Mercure, a supposed stand-in for the real-world Russian Federation. Shown through an extremely low-poly map of Europe, Arnland was depicted roughly in the same location as the real-world French Republic the exercise was hosted in. Mercure was east of Arnland, and Bothnia, Framland, and Otso were on the map too.

Japan formally started the process of reaching an MoU to use DATE World in 2024. That year, the annual US-Japan training exercise Yama Sakura, which had expanded to include Australia, used DATE World.

The 2025 satire war film Atropia portrays an actor working in a village meant to simulate DATE World war games.

The biennial Exercise RIMPAC is planned to use DATE World in 2026.

=== Nations involved ===
The following list is of real-world nations involved with DATE World.

- Australia
- Belgium
- Brunei
- Canada
- Fiji
- France
- Germany
- Greece
- India
- Indonesia
- Italy
- Japan
- Malaysia
- Netherlands
- New Zealand
- Norway
- Papua New Guinea
- Philippines
- South Korea
- Singapore
- Slovenia
- Spain
- Thailand
- Tonga
- United Arab Emirates
- United Kingdom
- United States
- Vietnam

== Literature ==
- The Pretend Villages: Inside the U.S. Military Training Grounds by Christopher Sims
- Marines at War: Stories from Afghanistan and Iraq by Paolo G. Tripodi and Kelly Frushour
- Nonstate Warfare: The Military Methods of Guerillas, Warlords, and Militias by Stephen Biddle

=== DATE World documentation ===
- Decisive Action Training Environment version 2.2 — official TRADOC documentation from April 2015
- CJTF 667 OPORD 01 OPERATION STEEL SENTINEL: Version 2.0 — documentation of Operation Steel Sentinel by the Australian Defence Force
- Operation Bronze Achilles: Joint Intelligence Preparation of the Operational Environment (JIPOE) — documentation of Operation Steel Sentinel by the Australian Defence Force

== See also ==
- United States Army Special Forces selection and training § UW CULEX (Robin Sage): Phase V (4 weeks)
