= Charlet Duboc =

British journalist

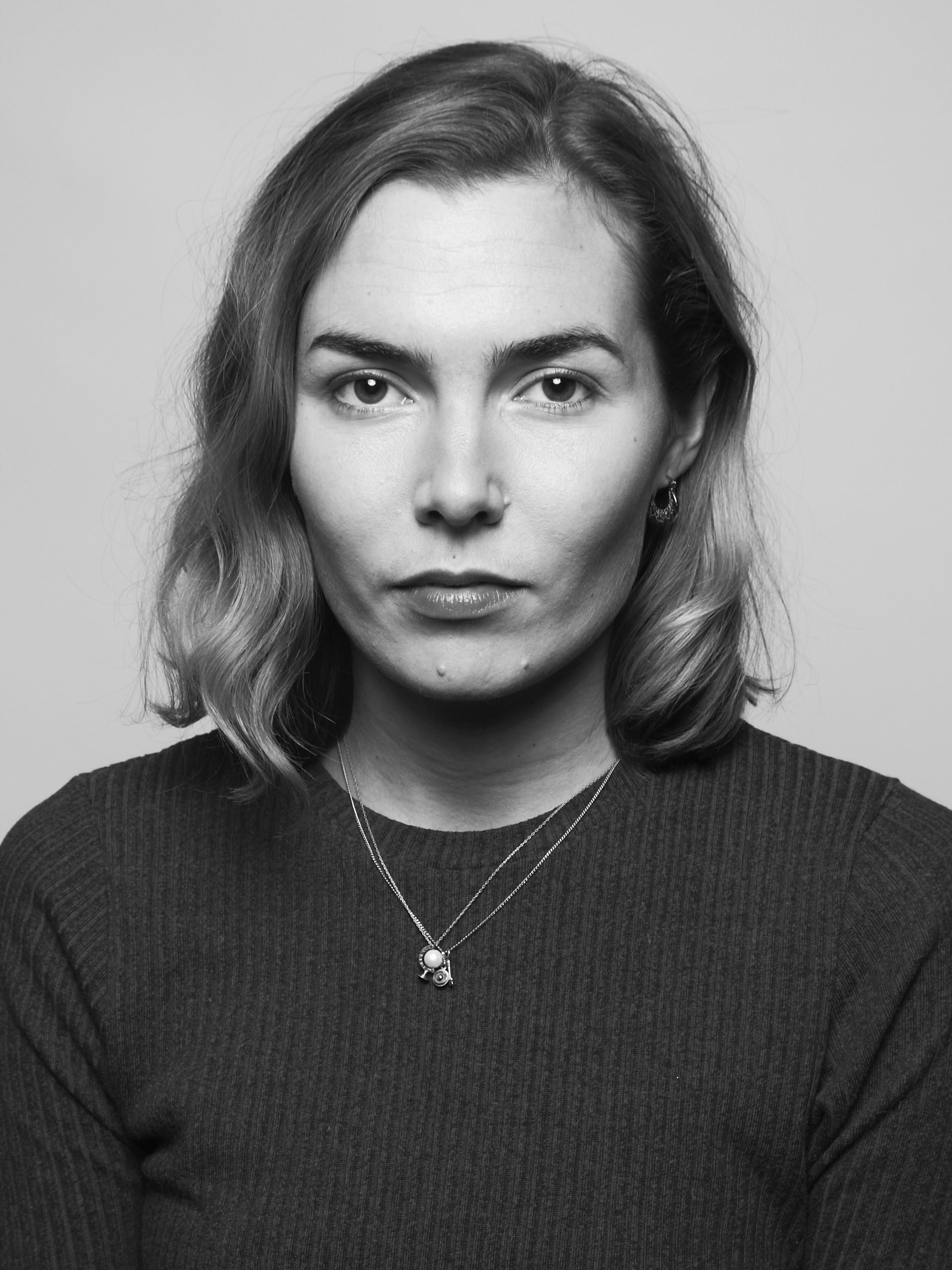
- Born: Surrey, England
- Occupations: Journalist; filmmaker
- Known for: Vice host

Charlet (Charlotte) Duboc is a British documentary filmmaker and on-screen host based in the US.

== Early life ==
Duboc was born in Surrey, United Kingdom, where she lived until the age of 17 before moving to London to pursue a BA in American Studies with Film at King's College London. Captivated by VICE magazine as a teenager, she said in a 2013 interview: "I'd even travel all the way to London to get a copy of the magazine. I'd take it home, hide it from my mum..."

== Career ==
In 2010 Duboc started at VICE Media in London as an editorial intern. During that time, she pitched the idea for documentary series 'Fashion Week Internationale' which she hosted until 2016 before stepping behind the camera, re-booting the show as 'States of Undress' for an American audience and casting Hailey Gates as host. Duboc went on to create further content in the US across Vice's digital news and TV platforms as well as streaming networks such as HBO, Hulu and Showtime. She has appeared on CNN, MSNBC, Last Week Tonight with John Oliver and has written for the Guardian and the Independent.
