= States of Undress =

- Genre: Documentary
- Directed by: Jack Newman, Jessica Kelly
- Starring: Hailey Gates
- Country of origin: United States
- Original language: English
- No. of seasons: 2

Production
- Executive producers: Charlet Duboc, Al Brown
- Cinematography: Jack Newman, Niall Kenny, Henry Lockyer, Benjie Croce
- Camera setup: Multi-camera
- Running time: 44 minutes

Original release
- Network: Viceland
- Release: March 30, 2016 – August 1, 2017

States of Undress is a show on Viceland television hosted by actress and model Hailey Gates, exploring the fashion scenes in various countries, at the same time offering an insight into the culture, history and politics of the country.

== Episodes ==
No.	Title	Original release date
1.1	"Pakistan"	March 30, 2016
Hailey Gates heads to Pakistan for Karachi Fashion Week. There she finds sanctuary from forces on the outside who are looking to eradicate the progressive culture that the event represents including Abdul Aziz Ghazi and Umme Hassan.
1.2	"Congo"	April 6, 2016
The capital city of Kinshasa in the Congo is a fashionable place and a runway for its citizens. Fashion can serve as either a means for progress or a distraction from social tensions within the country.
1.3	"Venezuela"	April 13, 2016
Hailey discovers beauty is a popular and dangerous pursuit in Venezuela, a country with a history of violence and protest.
1.4	"Russia"	April 27, 2016
In Russia, buying a fur coat is almost a rite of passage; despite the sanctions on western fashion the demand for luxury clothing continues to grow in the region.
1.5	"Palestine"	May 4, 2016
Fashion week offers Palestinians some freedom of self-expression, Hailey explores how a country seeking sovereignty defines itself through culture.
1.6	"China"	May 11, 2016
Hailey explores the massive manufacturing industry in China, which is servicing the world and shifting into greater focus on design.
2.1	"Packing Heat in Heels"	June 6, 2017
Women are becoming the largest group of gun owners and regular carriers in the US. Hailey goes shooting with a grandma, and attends a concealed-carry fashion show in Ohio.
2.2	"Clothing and Corruption in Liberia"	June 13, 2017
Hailey explores the world of Americo-Liberians who try to shake Liberia out of a cultural standstill by hosting a revolutionary event, Fashion Week Liberia.
2.3	"Beyond the Burkini in France"	June 20, 2017
Hailey heads to France to explore the rise in Islamophobia and how it's impacting how Muslim women dress and style their clothing.
2.4	"Thai Transgender Beauty Pageant"	June 27, 2017
Hailey journeys to Thailand to examine the impact of transgender models and how they are redefining fashion and speaking to a new generation. She questions if runway representation leads to social progress.
2.5	"Cholita Fashion in Bolivia"	July 11, 2017
Hailey explores the identity politics driving Bolivia through their clothing trade. She looks at rise of the indigenous cholita class.
2.6	"Couture and Conflict in Lebanon"	July 18, 2017
Hailey travels to Beirut to see the world renowned fashion in Lebanon being revolutionised by Syrian refugees, as the country is known for their talented designers and glamorous gowns.
2.7	"Urban Tribes of Mexico City"	July 25, 2017
In Mexico City, familiar subcultures, such as punk and emo, transform into warring urban tribes and Hailey goes to all corners of the city to find out why these unique identities have taken hold.
2.8	"Communism, Cam Girls and Kidnapping"	August 1, 2017
Hailey travels to Romania, in the midst of the largest protests since the fall of communism, to find out what it's like to be the first generation of women raised in the EU.

== See also ==
- List of programs broadcast by Viceland
