= Hailey Gates =

American model, actress, director and journalist

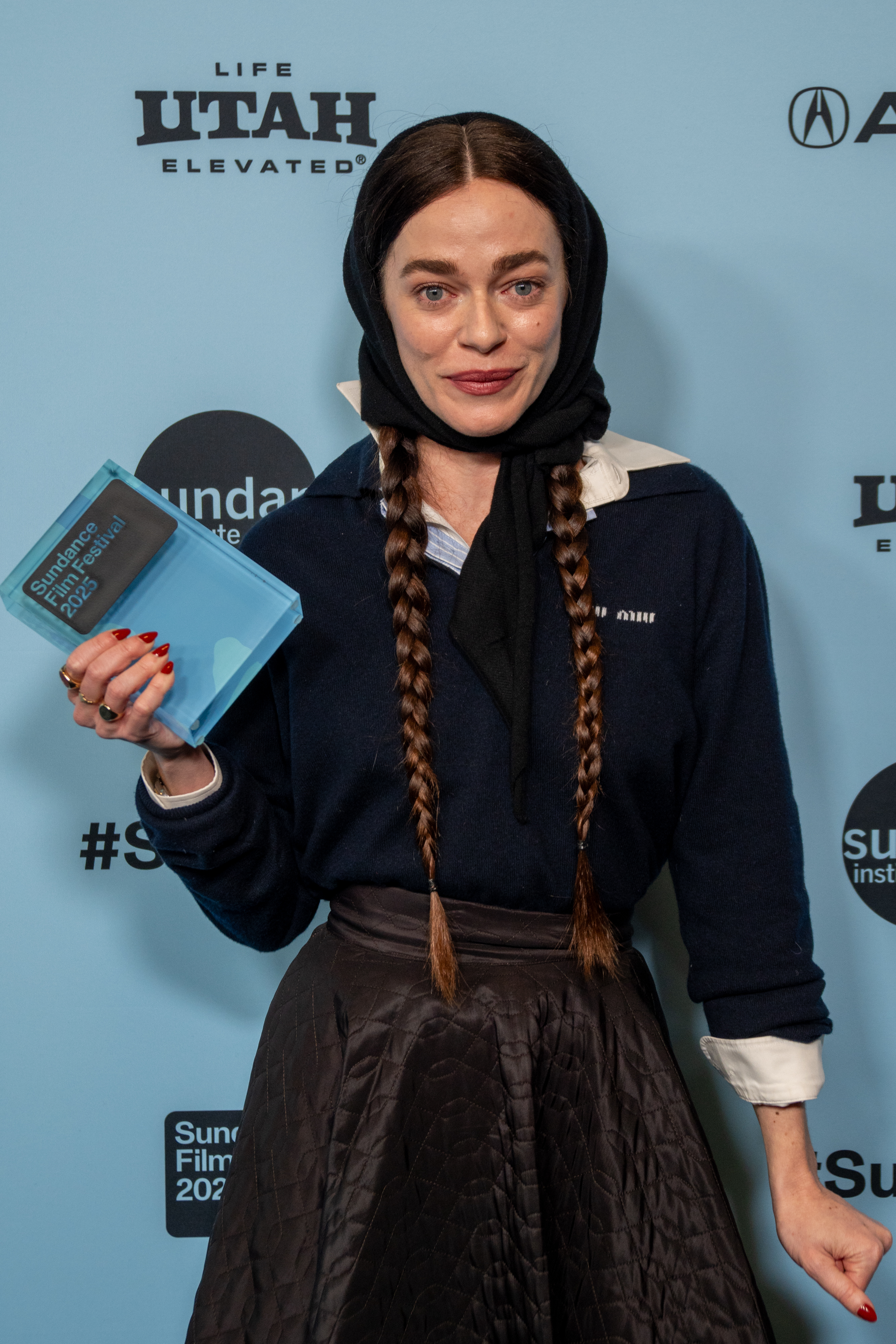
- Gates at the 2025 Sundance Film Festival
- Born: Hailey Benton Gates; 28 March 1990 (age 36); Los Angeles, California, U.S.
- Education: New York University
- Occupations: Actress; model; director
- Years active: 2012–present

Hailey Benton Gates is an American model, actress, director, and journalist. She hosted the Viceland series States of Undress.

== Early life ==
Gates grew up in the Los Angeles area, where her family has resided for seven generations. Gates' parents separated during her childhood. Gates' maternal grandmother is screenwriter Joan Tewkesbury. Her great-grandfather was the first mayor of Santa Monica.

In 2012, Gates graduated with a Bachelor of Fine Arts in experimental theater from the Tisch School of the Arts at New York University.

== Career ==
=== The Paris Review ===
Upon her graduation from New York University in 2012, Gates began working as an editor and director of advertising at The Paris Review. She left the magazine in 2015.

=== Modeling ===
Gates has starred in campaigns for Miu Miu (by Steve Meisel), Costume National, and Target. She also appeared on the July/August 2011 cover of Jalouse magazine. She is currently signed to M Model Management.

=== Acting ===
Gates appeared in Ricki and the Flash as Emily in 2015. She also co-wrote and produced A Space Program, a 2015 docudrama, with artist Tom Sachs. The film received a positive review from The New York Times.

Gates hosted Viceland's States of Undress. The investigative docu-series focuses on the political and social circumstances surrounding fashion weeks around the world. The show's second season premiered on June 6, 2017.

Gates had a small role as "drugged-out mother" in David Lynch's 2017 reboot of Twin Peaks on Showtime. In 2019, Gates appeared in the Safdie brothers' movie Uncut Gems.

Gates also appeared as Charli XCX's creative director Celeste in Aidan Zamiri's mockumentary The Moment.

=== Directing ===
In January 2019, a short film directed by Gates and starring Alia Shawkat, Shako Mako, premiered in Los Angeles. The film was produced as part of Miu Miu's Women's Tales series of shorts directed by women. In 2023, Gates wrote and directed a feature-length film Atropia with Alia Shawkat and Callum Turner among the cast.

== Personal life ==
As of May 2016, Gates resides on the Upper West Side of New York City.

== Filmography ==
=== Film ===
==== As actress ====
Year	Title	Role	Notes
2015	Ricki and the Flash	Emily	
2019	Uncut Gems	Adley's Receptionist	
2021	O Night Divine	Babette	Holiday-themed short directed by Luca Guadagnino
2024	Challengers	Helen	
2025	Marty Supreme	Trish	
2026	The Moment	Celeste	
2026	The Drama	Misha	
TBA	Untitled Takashi Miike film	TBA	Filming

==== As writer/director ====
Year	Title	Director	Writer	Notes
2015	A Space Program	No	Yes	
2019	Shako Mako	Yes	Yes	Short
2025	Atropia	Yes	Yes	

=== Television ===
Year	Title	Role	Notes
2016–2017	States of Undress	Host	14 episodes
2017	Twin Peaks: The Return	Drugged-Out Mother	3 episodes
