= Military Open Simulator Enterprise Strategy =

U.S. Army virtual world test project

Military Open Simulator Enterprise Strategy (MOSES) is a U.S. Army project evaluating the ability of OpenSimulator to provide independent and secured access to a virtual world.

MOSES is a research project of the United States Army Simulation and Training Technology Center (STTC), led by Science and Technology Manager Dr. Douglas Maxwell. STTC's Virtual World Strategic Applications team uses applications such as OpenSimulator to augment existing U.S. Army virtual trainers to add capability and flexibility during training scenarios.

MOSES' initial goals were met 4th quarter 2012, namely using open source software to:

- Provide a stable virtual environment, with
- Content portability (able to be moved to other grids),
- Low cost (no licensing fees), and
- Guidelines for use (documentation).

MOSES' effort continues on additional goals including

- Linking with other grids with secured, encrypted communications, and
- Larger scale user support.

== Timeline ==
=== 2010 ===
The Second Life Enterprise program is cancelled by Linden Lab in Spring of 2010. Significant value in the unique approach to virtual world simulation had been identified as well as investment in the platform. To ensure continuity in the research and the investment in content, a pivot was made to a compatible Open Source platform, the OpenSimulator. Support for OpenSimulator terrain was added to the RUGUD (Rapid Unified Generation of Urban Databases RUGUD) terrain database generator. Real world terrain is now available for use inside the MOSES, and by extension the OpenSimulator. This represents the first major technology transfer offering of the MOSES project to the OpenSimulator community.

=== 2011 ===
MOSES publicly debuted March 22, 2011 at the Defense GameTech Users Conference in Orlando, Florida. MOSES was made open to non-U.S. Army researchers, including enterprise, university, Air Force and Navy, to encourage sharing of content creation and testing.

=== 2013 ===
MOSES and Intel Corporation partner under Cooperative Research and Development Agreement #ARL-15-00xx. MOSES/Intel performs series of scalability experiments.

=== 2014 ===
MOSES researchers use LIDAR based scanning techniques to rapidly create actual operating environments and use them inside the MOSES platform. In cooperation with UCF/Institute for Simulation Technology, the MOSES team developed a content ingestion method to allow for actual operational areas to be scanned using LIDAR and then produce scenario output for use in a virtual world. The initial proof of concept of this workflow was to use the UCF Partnership II and Partnership III buildings and surrounding areas.

MOSES is used for the first time in a planned training exercise at the 2/124th Florida Army National Guard for a research pilot study of training effectiveness of simulation based training for a room clearing exercise.

=== 2015 ===
The Federal Consortium for Virtual Worlds was held in a completely online forum for the first time on March 6 and 7.

MOSES researchers build a photogrammetry rig for the purpose of creating realistic avatars, quickly. Cost per avatar drops dramatically.

=== 2016 ===
Dr. Douglas Maxwell calls for Open Simulator community to consider the formation of a foundation for the purpose of being an official contact and stakeholder.

== See also ==
- Military simulation
- RDECOM
- Not to be confused with Meta Operating System & Entity Shell (MOSES) early 1990s virtual reality project associated with University of Washington's Human Interface Technology Lab (HITL).
