= Atropia (film) =

American drama film

- Theatrical release poster
- Directed by: Hailey Gates
- Written by: Hailey Gates
- Produced by: Naima Abed; Émilie Georges; Luca Guadagnino; Lana Kim; Jett Steiger
- Starring: Alia Shawkat; Callum Turner; Zahra Alzubaidi; Tony Shawkat; Jane Levy; Tim Heidecker; Lola Kirke; Chloë Sevigny
- Cinematography: Eric K. Yue
- Edited by: Madeleine Gavin; Sophie Corra
- Music by: Max Whipple; Ari Balouzian; Robert Ames
- Production companies: Frenesy Film Company; Paradise City; Ways & Means; Big Creek Projects
- Distributed by: Vertical
- Release dates: January 25, 2025 (Sundance); December 12, 2025 (United States)
- Running time: 103 minutes
- Country: United States
- Language: English
- Box office: $57,520

Atropia is a 2025 American war satire film written and directed by Hailey Gates in her feature length debut, and produced by Luca Guadagnino. It stars Alia Shawkat, Callum Turner, Zahra Alzubaidi, Tony Shawkat, Jane Levy, Tim Heidecker, Lola Kirke, and Chloë Sevigny.

Atropia had its world premiere at the 2025 Sundance Film Festival on January 25, 2025, where it received mixed reviews from critics. Despite this, it won the Grand Jury Prize in the festival's U.S. Dramatic Competition. It was released by Vertical on December 12, 2025.

== Plot ==
The film follows an aspiring actress working for a military role-playing facility, posing as a fictional country known as Atropia.

== Cast ==
- Alia Shawkat as Fayruz
- Callum Turner as Abu Dice
- Zahra Alzubaidi as Noor
- Tony Shawkat as Mayor
- Jane Levy as Nancy
- Tim Heidecker as Hayden
- Lola Kirke as Candy
- Chloë Sevigny as Pina
- Phil Burgers as Lackey
- Chloe East as Medic Grimes
- Gilberto Ortiz as Private iPod
- Sal Lopez as Jerry
- Shaholly Ayers as Maria
- Gil Perez-Abraham as Private Wyatt
- Tim Blake Nelson as Mr. Speaker
- Channing Tatum as The Actor

== Production ==
Produced by Frenesy Film Company with Luca Guadagnino as producer, the film is directed by Hailey Gates in her feature length debut that was shot in July 2023. That year, the film had received Californian tax credits for production. The film is based on Gates' 2019 short film, Shako Mako, which was produced as part of Miu Miu's Women's Tales series of shorts directed by women and featured Alia Shawkat. That short followed an actress on the set of a replica foreign village on Fort Irwin National Training Center, used by the American military to train soldiers prior to combat. The cast on Atropia again includes Shawkat, with Callum Turner and Chloë Sevigny confirmed in the cast in February 2024. Tim Heidecker was announced to be part of the cast in November 2024. In January 2025, it was revealed that Channing Tatum made a cameo appearance in the film.

== Release ==
Atropia premiered on January 25, 2025 at the Sundance Film Festival, where it won the Grand Jury Prize. In October, Vertical acquired North American distribution rights to the film, giving it a theatrical release in the United States on December 12, 2025.

Atropia had its New York City premiere at The Downtown Festival on October 10, 2025. The sold out screening was followed by a conversation between Hailey Gates and filmmaker Douglas Keeve.

It also competed in New Directors Competition at the São Paulo International Film Festival and had screening on 18 October 2025.

== Reception ==
=== Critical response ===
On the review aggregator website Rotten Tomatoes, 41% of 61 critics' reviews are positive, with an average rating of 5.6/10. The website's consensus reads: "Atropia's satirical farce of a militarized industrial complex is buoyed by Alia Shawkat's committed performance to a point, but ultimately succumbs under the weight of its own pretense." Metacritic, which uses a weighted average, assigned the film a score of 53 out of 100, based on 14 critics, indicating "mixed or average" reviews.

=== Accolades ===
Award	Date of ceremony	Category	Recipient(s)	Result	Ref.
Sundance Film Festival	February 2, 2025	Grand Jury Prize Dramatic	Atropia	Won	

Awards
Preceded by In the Summers	Sundance Grand Jury Prize: U.S. Dramatic; 2025	Succeeded by
