= Atropia (fictional country) =

Fictional country created by the U.S. military

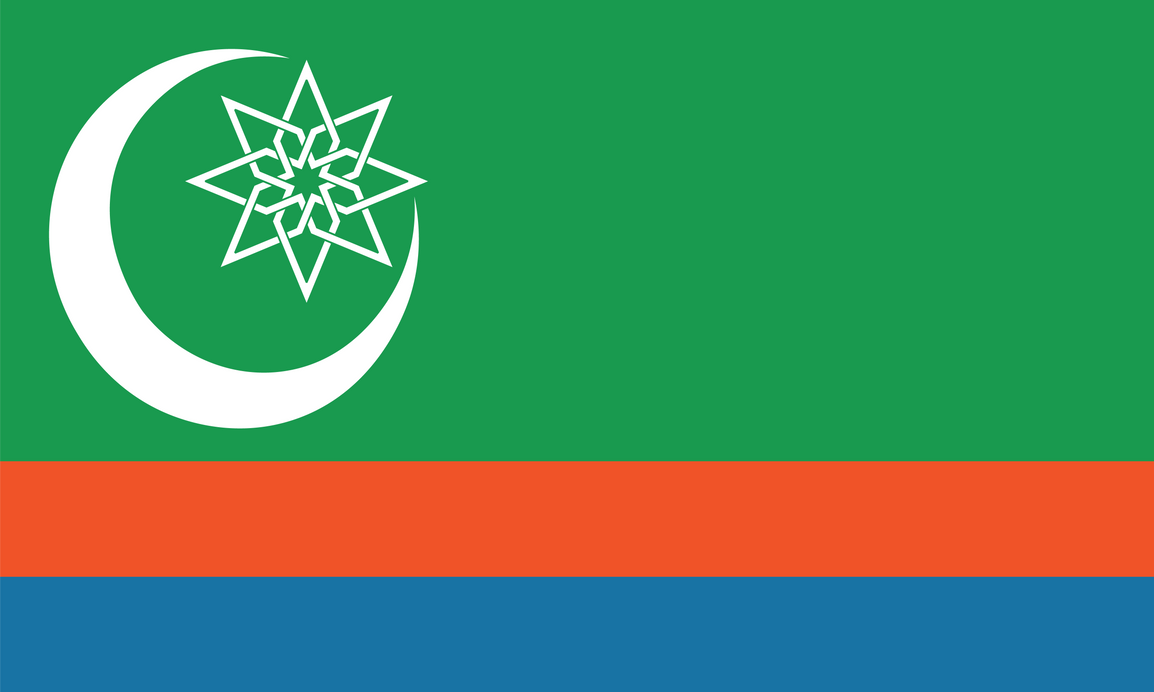
The flag of Atropia

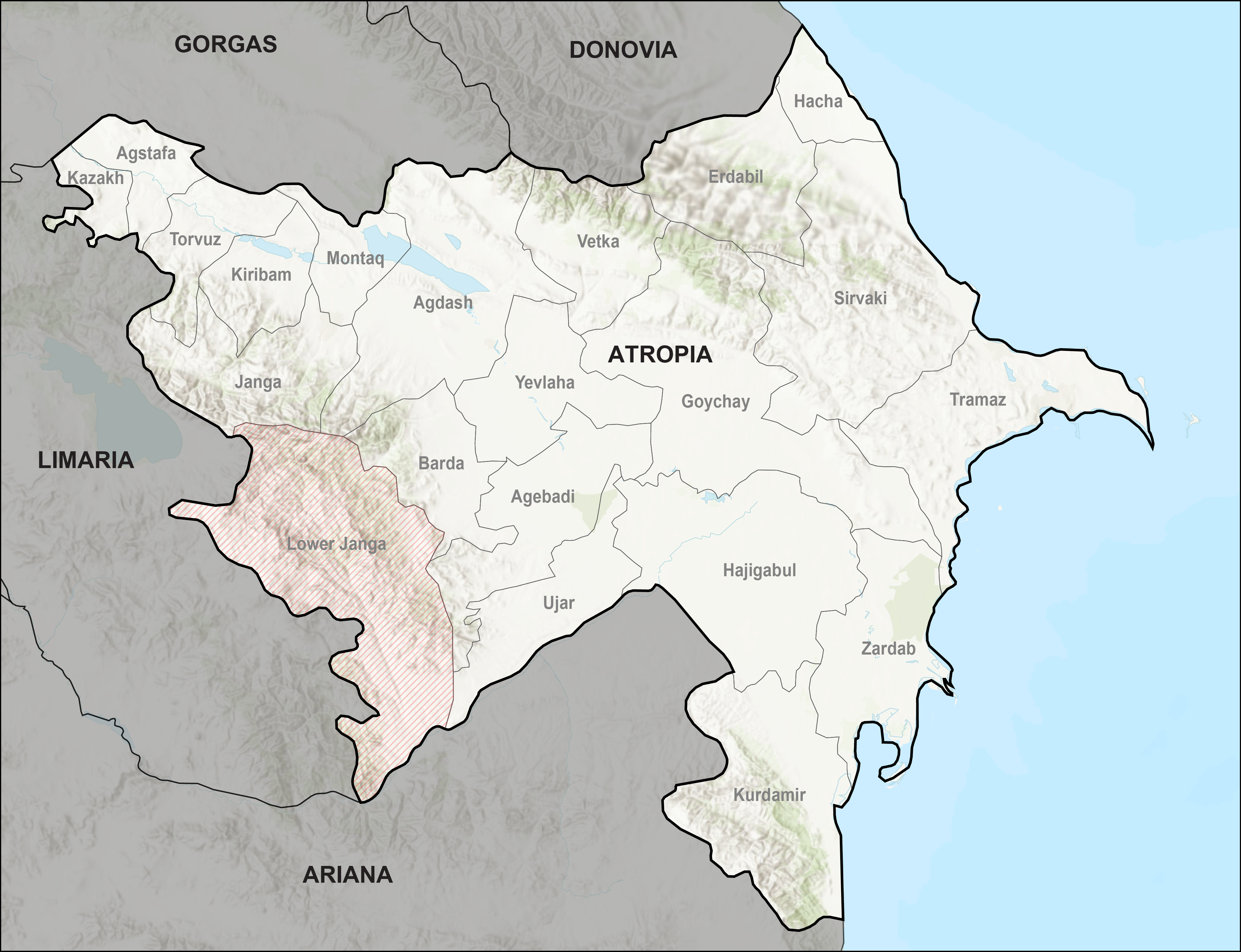
Map of Atropia

Atropia is a fictional country created by the United States Armed Forces for military exercises. Atropia is a fictional "pro-Western dictatorship" in the Caucasus where U.S. military personnel must operate in accordance with international law. It was developed in 2012 as part of the DATE World, a fictional world used by the U.S. military for training.

== History ==
Atropia was first developed in 2012 by the U.S. Army's training command. The country is supposedly located in the Caucasus, with borders that roughly coincide with Azerbaijan. Atropia's neighbors include "Limaria" modeled after Armenia, "Kemalia" after Turkey, "Donovia" after Dagestan, "Gorgas" after Georgia, and "Ariana" after Iran.

The name "Atropia" has been used for a complex of 12 mock villages built at the Fort Irwin National Training Center in California’s Mojave Desert. The movie Atropia is named after this training center.

The Atropia setting has also been used in battlefield exercises at the Joint Readiness Training Center in Fort Polk, Louisiana as well as Fort Bragg, North Carolina.

Atropia has also been used for computer-based military simulations, including one published under a Creative Commons license in 2014.

== Operational environment ==
The following is an overview of Atropia as described in the U.S. Army Training and Doctrine Command's Decisive Action Training Environment (DATE).

=== Politics ===
Atropia is described as being a "neutral, Western-leaning oligarchy." The country has very few personal freedoms, and the government rules like an autocracy. Atropia is located in the Caucasus. Corruption within the government is widespread.

=== Economy ===
Atropia's main sources of wealth come from their oil and natural gas resources.

=== Military ===
Atropia's military is separated into four main branches: army, marine corps, navy, and air force. There are also two other paramilitary branches, the national police and the border guards.

== See also ==
- Veyshnoria, fictional country made for Russo-Belarusian military exercises
