= 46th Golden Raspberry Awards =

Award ceremony for worst in film in 2025

- Awarded for: Worst in film
- Date: March 14, 2026
- Site: Los Angeles, California

Highlights
- Worst Picture: War of the Worlds
- Most awards: War of the Worlds (5)
- Most nominations: Snow White / War of the Worlds (6)

The 46th Golden Raspberry Awards, or the Razzies, honored the worst films released in 2025 on March 14, 2026. The awards are based on votes from members of the Golden Raspberry Foundation. The nominees were announced on January 21, 2026.

The nominations were selected through emailed ballots by more than 1,100 Razzie members from across the United States and approximately two dozen other countries.

== Winners and nominees ==
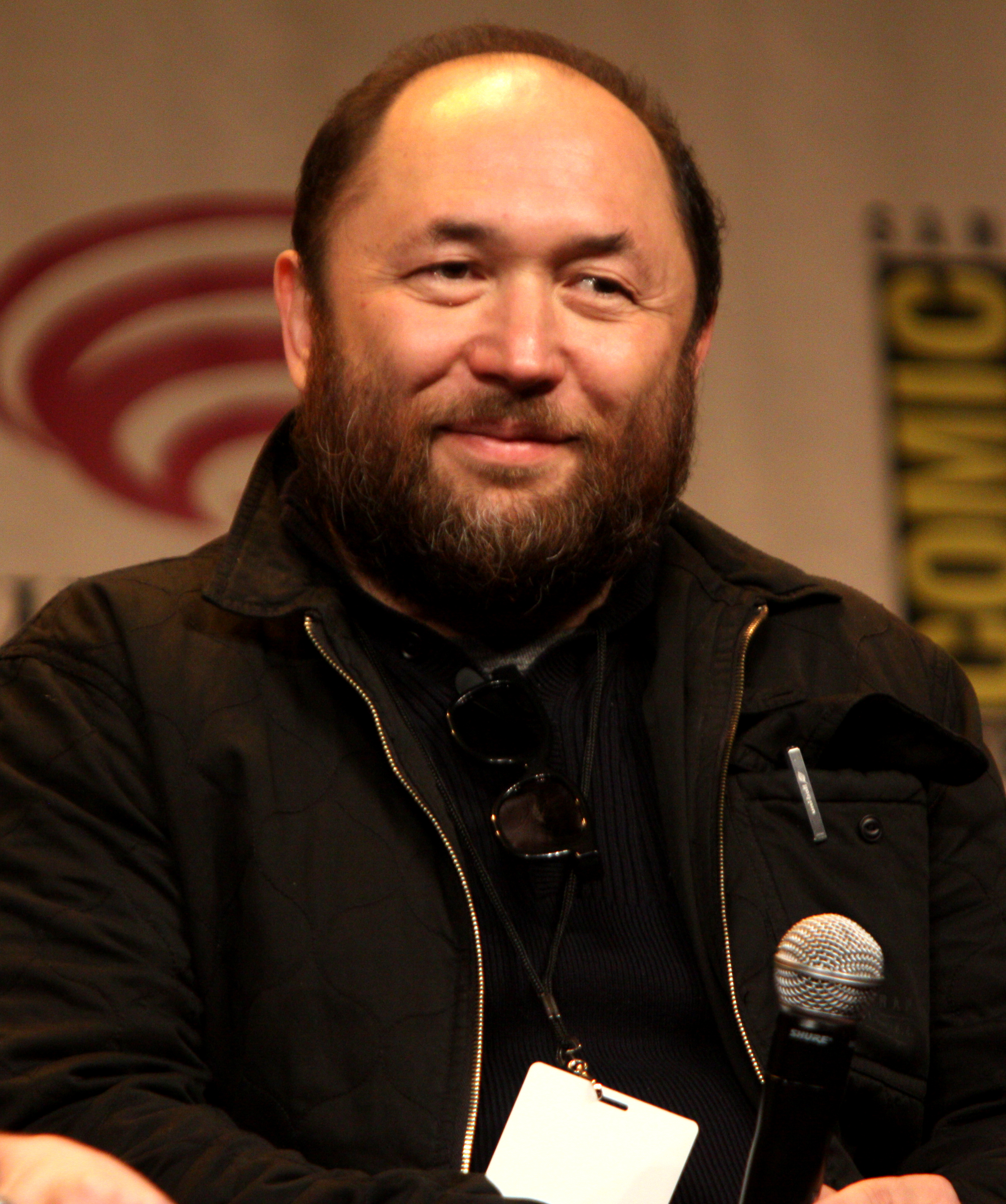
Timur Bekmambetov, Worst Picture co-winner

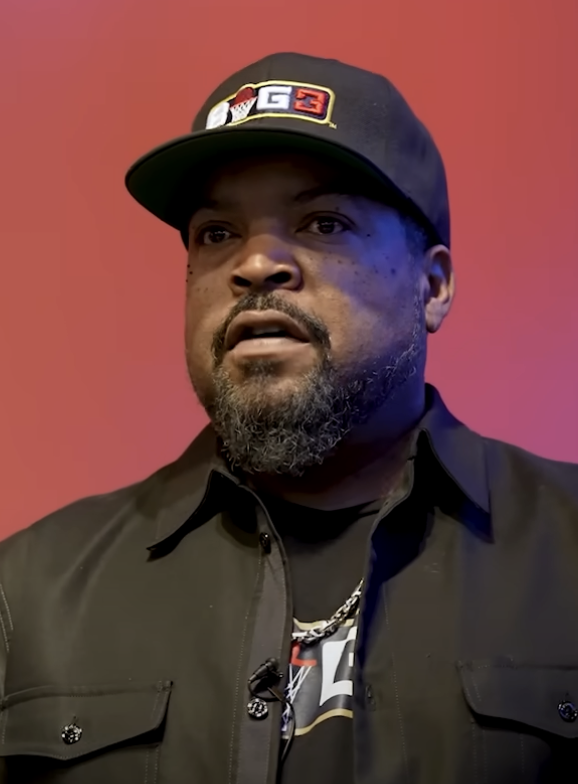
Ice Cube, Worst Actor winner

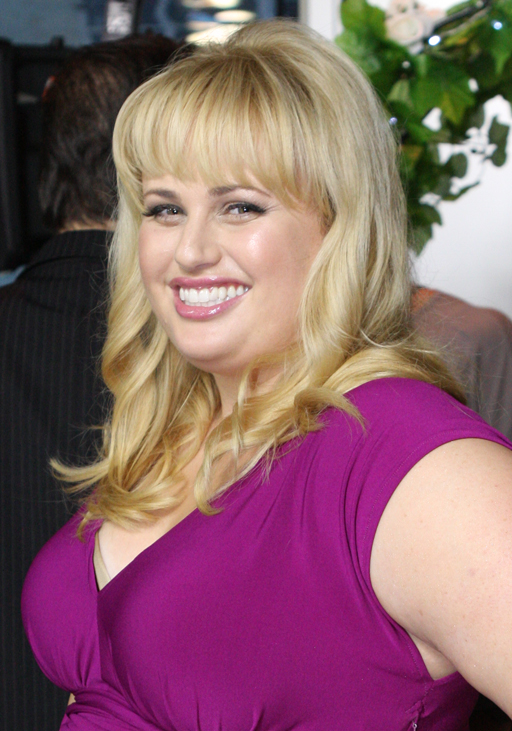
Rebel Wilson, Worst Actress winner

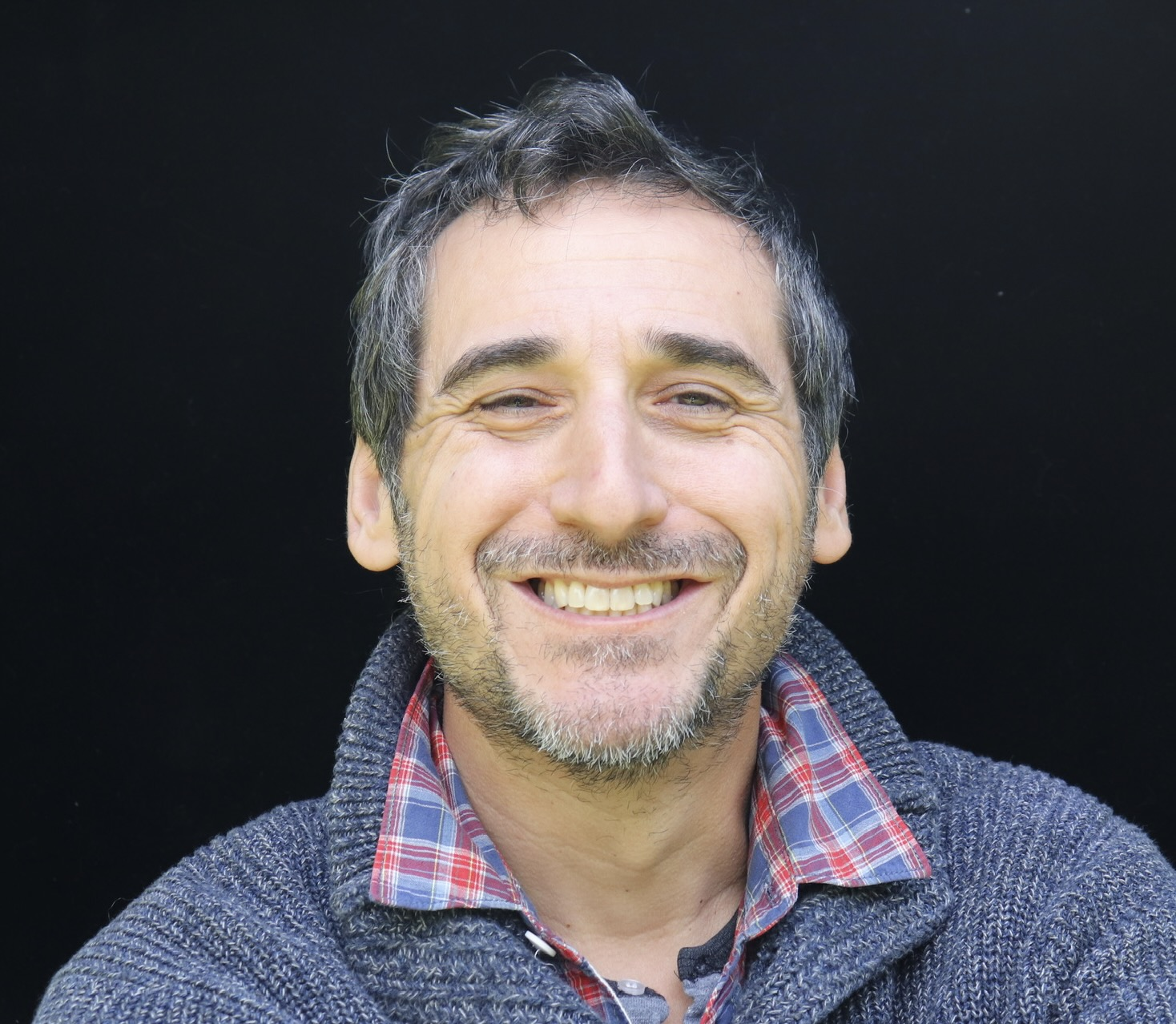
Marc Hyman, Worst Screenplay co-winner

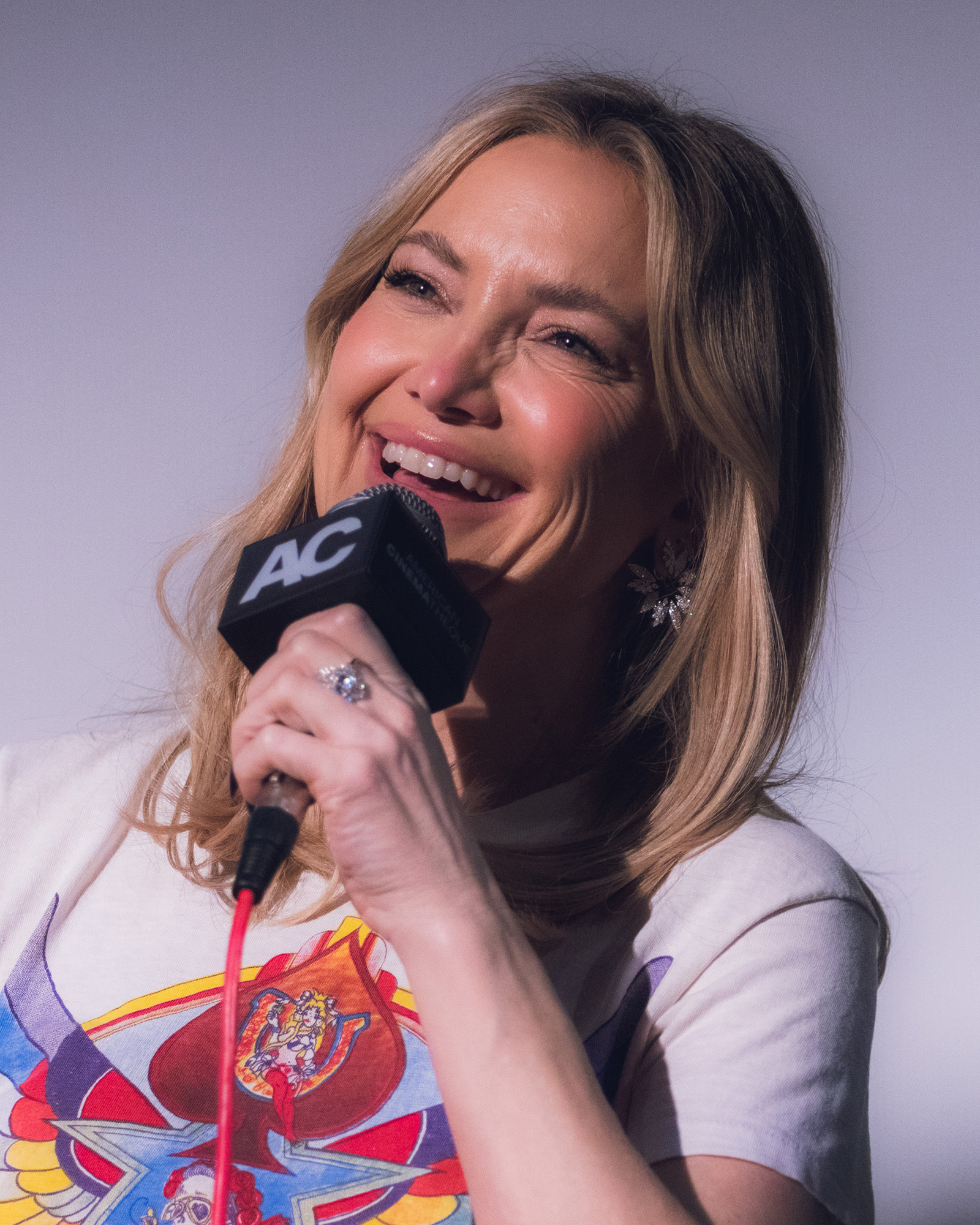
Kate Hudson, Razzie Redeemer Award winner

Worst Picture: War of the Worlds (Universal) – Patrick Aiello and Timur Bekmambetov; The Electric State (Netflix) – Russell Ackerman, Chris Castaldi, Mike Larocca, Patrick Newall, Anthony Russo, and Joe Russo; Hurry Up Tomorrow (Lionsgate) – Reza Fahim, Harrison Kreiss, Abel Tesfaye, and Kevin Turen; Snow White (Disney) – Jared LeBoff and Marc Platt; Star Trek: Section 31 (Paramount+) – Ted Miller	Worst Director: Rich Lee – War of the Worlds; Olatunde Osunsanmi – Star Trek: Section 31; The Russo Brothers – The Electric State; Trey Edward Shults – Hurry Up Tomorrow; Marc Webb – Snow White
Worst Actor: Ice Cube – War of the Worlds as Will Radford; Dave Bautista – In the Lost Lands as Boyce; Scott Eastwood – Alarum as Joe Travers / Archibald; Jared Leto – Tron: Ares as Ares; Abel "The Weeknd" Tesfaye – Hurry Up Tomorrow as Abel Tesfaye	Worst Actress: Rebel Wilson – Bride Hard as Sam; Ariana DeBose – Love Hurts as Rose Carlisle; Milla Jovovich – In the Lost Lands as Gray Alys; Natalie Portman – Fountain of Youth as Charlotte Purdue; Michelle Yeoh – Star Trek: Section 31 as Philippa Georgiou
Worst Supporting Actor: All Seven Artificial Dwarfs – Snow White; Nicolas Cage – Gunslingers as Ben; Stephen Dorff – Bride Hard as Kurt; Greg Kinnear – Off the Grid as Ranish; Sylvester Stallone – Alarum as Chester	Worst Supporting Actress: Scarlet Rose Stallone – Gunslingers as Bella; Anna Chlumsky – Bride Hard as Virginia; Ema Horvath – The Strangers – Chapter 2 as Shelly / Pin-Up Girl; Kacey Rohl – Star Trek: Section 31 as Rachel Garrett; Ísis Valverde – Alarum as Bridgette
Worst Screen Combo: All Seven Artificial Dwarfs – Snow White; James Corden & Rihanna – Smurfs; Ice Cube & His Zoom Camera – War of the Worlds; Robert De Niro & Robert De Niro (as Frank & Vito) – The Alto Knights; The Weeknd & His Colossal Ego – Hurry Up Tomorrow	Worst Remake, Rip-off or Sequel: War of the Worlds (Universal); Five Nights at Freddy's 2 (Universal); I Know What You Did Last Summer (Sony Pictures Releasing); Smurfs (Paramount); Snow White (Disney)
Worst Screenplay: War of the Worlds – screen story and screenplay by Kenny Golde and screenplay by Marc Hyman, adapting (or destroying) the classic novel by H. G. Wells; The Electric State – screenplay by Christopher Markus and Stephen McFeely (adapted from the illustrated novel by Simon Stålenhag); Hurry Up Tomorrow – screenplay by Trey Edward Shults, Abel Tesfaye, and Reza Fahim; Snow White – screenplay by Erin Cressida Wilson and a bunch of others too numerous to mention (drawing from the original fairy tale by the Brothers Grimm); Star Trek: Section 31 – screenplay by Craig Sweeny with original story concept developed by Bo Yeon Kim and Erika Lippoldt	Razzie Redeemer Award: Kate Hudson (Note: Previously won Worst Actress for Music (2021).) – Song Sung Blue

=== Films with multiple nominations ===
The following films received multiple nominations:

Films with multiple nominations
Nominations	Film
6	Snow White
6	War of the Worlds
5	Hurry Up Tomorrow
5	Star Trek: Section 31
3	Alarum
3	Bride Hard
3	The Electric State
2	Gunslingers
2	In the Lost Lands
2	Smurfs

=== Films with multiple wins ===
The following films received multiple awards:

Films with multiple awards
Wins	Film
5	War of the Worlds
2	Snow White

== Ceremony information ==
The Disney live-action remake Snow White and screenlife adaptation of War of the Worlds led the nominations with six each, followed by Hurry Up Tomorrow and Star Trek: Section 31 with five apiece.

With her Oscar nomination as one of the producers of the animated film Arco, Natalie Portman became the thirteenth individual nominated for an Oscar (Best Animated Feature) and a Razzie (Worst Actress for Fountain of Youth) in the same year.

Despite Snow White tying for the most nominations, Diego Pacheco of Collider criticized and questioned the omission of Gal Gadot (whose portrayal of the Evil Queen was widely panned by critics and viewers) (Note: Attributed to multiple references:) for Worst Supporting Actress, writing, "It's hard to deny that Gal Gadot's performance as the iconic Evil Queen is laughable at best. There are several reasons why this remake failed the original, not least of which is the fact that Disney's first-ever villain had to be played by an actress whose line delivery and demeanor feel as wooden as the spinning wheel that sent Aurora to sleep."
