= Kenny Golde =

American director, screenwriter, producer, and author

Kenny Golde (sometimes credited as "Kenneth Golde") is an American director, screenwriter, producer, and author. He is known for The Job (2003) and Uncross the Stars (2008).

== Career ==
He co-wrote the 2000 movie The Smokers, starring Dominique Swain and Busy Philipps. His directorial debut was the 2001 short TV movie Food for Thought starring Brian Chase, Emily Harrison, David Ogden Stiers, and G. Charles Wright. Early directing credits include the Chris Rock biography episode of Headliners & Legends with Matt Lauer, a 2001 TV Series documentary, and the 2001 TV Special Spotlight Health: Interview with Calvin Hill.

He worked on Intimate Portrait between 1998 and 2003, directing seven episodes (Vanessa Marcil, Joan Collins, Amy Grant, Kellie Martin, Lisa Rinna, Kelly Preston, Christie Brinkley), writing two episodes (Kelly Preston, Christie Brinkley), and producing eight (Michele Lee, Kelly Preston, Loni Anderson, Pam Grier, Christie Brinkley, Lea Thompson, Jaclyn Smith, Bonnie Hunt). Other directorial work around this time includes the 2004 television series The MANual, the 2005 documentary Bolivar: Path to Glory, and the Biography episode on Gary Coleman (2005).

He directed the 2003 movie The Job starring Daryl Hannah, Brad Renfro, Dominique Swain again, and Eric Mabius. He directed the 2008 movie Uncross the Stars starring Daniel Gillies, Barbara Hershey, Ron Perlman, and Irma P. Hall. He financed it himself after his investor, Gabe, passed away. In 2009, he directed five episodes of Life on Top.

He wrote the 2013 movie Walking with the Enemy starring Jonas Armstrong and Ben Kingsley. He has also produced many of the titles he directed and more, including Keys to Tulsa (1997), Dead Men Can't Dance (1997), Meet Wally Sparks (1997), The Maddening (1995), Walking with the Enemy (2013).

In 2020, Golde was reported to be the writer and director of the upcoming sci-fi movie Jupiter Effect, and the main screenwriter on Thirteen. He was a writer for the 2025 adaptation of War of the Worlds directed by Rich Lee and starring Eva Longoria, Ice Cube.

He is also the author of the book, The Do-It-Yourself Bailout.
