= The Intern (2000 film) =

Film by Michael Lange

Intern
- UK DVD cover
- Directed by: Michael Lange
- Written by: Caroline Doyle; Jill Kargman
- Produced by: Daniela Taplin Lundberg; Galt Niederhoffer; Ernst Etchie Stroh
- Starring: Dominique Swain; Ben Pullen; Joan Rivers; Peggy Lipton; Kathy Griffin; Billy Porter; Anna Levine; Paulina Porizkova
- Cinematography: Rodney Charters
- Edited by: Anita Brandt-Burgoyne
- Music by: Jimmy Harry
- Production companies: Given Films; Moonstone Entertainment
- Distributed by: L'Intern LLC
- Release date: January 21, 2000 (Sundance)
- Running time: 90 minutes
- Country: United States
- Language: English

Intern is a 2000 American satirical comedy film directed by Michael Lange about the shallow world of fashion magazines. It stars Dominique Swain, Joan Rivers, Peggy Lipton, Paulina Porizkova and Kathy Griffin. The film features multiple cameo appearances including Tommy Hilfiger, Kenneth Cole, Diane von Fürstenberg, Kevyn Aucoin, André Leon Talley, Samia Shoaib, and Gwyneth Paltrow.

Caroline Doyle and Jill Kargman, both of whom had stints in fashion journalism at Mademoiselle, Harper's Bazaar, and Interview magazines, wrote the screenplay. The film had its world premiere at the Sundance Film Festival on January 21, 2000.

== Plot ==
Jocelyn Bennett is an intern at the fictional New York City magazine, Skirt. Horribly mistreated, overworked, and underpaid, Jocelyn lives for Skirt, especially the photo spreads. A spy begins to hand over Skirt's spreads and story ideas to its rival glossy, Vogue. Skirt magazine finds itself in a bind and some people begin speculating who the infiltrator (everyone refers to the spy as a "yuri") might be. After some fingers begin to point at Jocelyn, she seeks to apprehend the spy and clear her name. Along the way, she meets Paul Rochester, the British deputy art director at Skirt, with whom she has much in common. When she finds herself falling in love, one thing stands in her way: Paul's supermodel girlfriend, Resin. Jocelyn continues to search for the spy but several obstacles stand in her way, including Art Director Sebastian Niedarfarb, who believes she is the spy and consistently puts Jocelyn down. However, as she begins to climb the ranks, she begins to stand out to the editors who realize her potential, though they quickly forget it. To make Paul jealous, she starts dating a photo shoot tech named Alex, though the relationship doesn't last. Jocelyn later learns that Resin is only dating Paul because he is related to Prince Charles. Soon after, the spy is apprehended. For her work, Jocelyn is made an assistant, on staff, and finally gets better treatment from her colleagues. During a party thrown by Skirt, Resin dumps Paul for another model, and Paul and Jocelyn get engaged. Two years later, the happy couple are shown on a PBS tour done by the newest intern at Skirt. Jocelyn has been made the senior photo editor at the magazine and Paul accomplished his dream of becoming a famous artist. They are set to be married in a few months.

== Cast ==
- Dominique Swain as Jocelyn Bennett
- Ben Pullen as Paul Rochester
- Leilani Bishop as Resin
- Peggy Lipton as Roxanne Rochet
- Paulina Porizkova as Chi Chi Chemise
- Billy Porter as Sebastian Niederfarb
- Kathy Griffin as Cornelia Crisp
- Anna Levine as Antoinette De la Paix
- Joan Rivers as Dolly Bellows
- Tommy Hilfiger as himself
- André Leon Talley as himself
- Diane von Fürstenberg as herself
- Kevyn Aucoin as himself
- Kenneth Cole as himself
- Gwyneth Paltrow as herself

== Reception ==
On Rotten Tomatoes, the film holds an approval rating of 38% based on reviews from 8 critics, with an average rating of 5.7/10.

While some critics praised the dialogue and writing of the film and said it contained a “few entertaining moments", others said it was "a disappointingly flat and familiar look at the glamour industry." Stephen Holden of The New York Times said, "The biggest mystery about Intern is how a film about people who are obsessed with appearances could wind up looking so hopelessly drab and tacky." Stephen MacMillan Moser of The Austin Chronicle said, "Intern isn't a particularly deep movie, but, to paraphrase Karl Lagerfeld, fashion is not the same thing as feeding the hungry and curing the ill."
