= Ozzy & Drix =

American animated television series

- Title card
- Genre: Action; Adventure; Workplace comedy Animated sitcom
- Based on: Osmosis Jones by Marc Hyman
- Developed by: Alan Burnett; Marc Hyman
- Directed by: Del Barras (season 2); Dennis Woodyard (season 2)
- Starring: Phil LaMarr; Jeff Bennett; Justin Cowden; Tasia Valenza; Alanna Ubach; Jim Cummings; Vivica A. Fox; Pat Fraley
- Narrated by: Phil LaMarr
- Theme music composer: Randall Crissman; Ed Driscoll
- Opening theme: "Ozzy & Drix", performed by Kenneth Gray
- Ending theme: "With the Cells in the Hood", performed by Kenneth Gray
- Composers: Randall Crissman; John Zuker
- Country of origin: United States
- Original language: English
- No. of seasons: 2
- No. of episodes: 26

Production
- Executive producers: Peter Farrelly; Bobby Farrelly; Zak Penn (season 2); Sander Schwartz
- Producers: Alan Burnett; Ron Myrick; Bradley Thomas
- Editor: Margaret Hou
- Running time: 22 minutes
- Production companies: Warner Bros. Family Entertainment; Conundrum Entertainment; Warner Bros. Animation (Note: Credited as Warner Bros. Television Animation from 2002 to 2003.)

Original release
- Network: Kids' WB
- Release: September 14, 2002 – July 5, 2004

Related
- Osmosis Jones

Ozzy & Drix is an American animated television series based on the 2001 film Osmosis Jones. It centers on Osmosis "Ozzy" Jones, a cheeky-chappy white blood cell, and Drix, a level-headed cold pill, who battle germs and viruses inside the body of a teenager named Hector Cruz. The series is set in a stylized version of the human body, which resembles a city where microorganisms and cells are anthropomorphic.

Produced by Conundrum Entertainment and Warner Bros. Animation, the series aired on Kids' WB for two seasons and 26 episodes from September 14, 2002 to July 5, 2004. It is the only animated spin-off spun from a film by Warner Bros. Feature Animation.

== Premise ==
At the beginning of the series, Osmosis "Ozzy" Jones (voiced by Phil LaMarr impersonating Chris Rock from the film), a white blood cell with an impulsive personality and a penchant for challenging authority, and Drix (voiced by Jeff Bennett impersonating David Hyde Pierce in the same film), a straight-laced and by-the-books cold pill, pursue a scarlet fever bacterium (voiced by Tim Curry). During the chase, the three get sucked up by a mosquito from their host body Frank DeTorre (voiced by Jeff Bennett) and are transported to the body of a 13-years old Cuban-American boy named Hector Cruz (voiced by Justin Cowden). After defeating the bacterium and settling into their new home, Ozzy and Drix are hired as private investigators, vowing to protect Hector's health and guide him through the misadventures of adolescence.

Supporting characters include Maria Amino (voiced by Tasia Valenza), a white blood cell cop who is highly skilled at fighting and also becomes a love interest for Drix; Mayor Paul Spryman (voiced by Alanna Ubach), the immature mayor of the city of Hector; Chief Gluteus (voiced by Jim Cummings), a stern muscle cell who serves as the city's police chief and Maria's superior; Ellen Patella (voiced by Vivica A. Fox), an attorney at law who helps cells find homes in Hector, and who becomes Ozzy's new love interest to replace Leah Estrogen after forever leaving her and Frank; and the Brain Cell Advisors (voiced by Pat Fraley), advisors who help Mayor Spryman run the city due to Spryman being incompetent in his job.

Recurring characters include The Mole (voiced by Jeffrey Tambor), a former secret agent who holds information on what is happening within Hector; Dander (vocal effects provided by Frank Welker), Drix's pet dog germ formed from the saliva of Hector's Saluki Uno; Christine Kolchuck (voiced by Kimberly Brooks), a friendly student who Hector has a crush on and looks out for Hector; Travis Lum (voiced by Rob Paulsen), Hector's classmate and best friend who also looks out for him; Ernst Strepfinger (voiced by Brad Garrett in season 1, Jim Cummings in season 2), a villainous germ who uses a gang of germs and viruses to carry out his dirty work; Uno (vocal effects provided by Frank Welker), Hector's dog whom he adopted in "Oh, My Dog"; and Hector's supportive parents, Mr. and Mrs. Cruz (voiced by Alanna Ubach and Joe Lala) who look after Hector's well-being.

== Production ==
Unlike the original film it was spin-off from, Ozzy & Drix was entirely animated and contained no live-action scenes. The series was also less intense and contained little adult humor compared to the film. The voices of Ozzy and Drix were recast with LaMarr replacing Chris Rock as Ozzy and Bennett replacing David Hyde Pierce as Drix. In multiple episodes, producer Ron Myrick integrated stock footage from the original film such as the human body's traffic, the inside of the mouth, and the dam bursting in the runny nose.

Ozzy, Drix, and Frank DeTorre are the only characters from the original film to return. Major characters from it such as Leah Estrogen, ex-mayor Phlegmming, the Chief of Police, Tom Colonic and well as human characters such as Shane, Bob and Mrs. Boyd are completely absent nor are they mentioned.

== Episodes ==
=== Series overview ===
Season	Episodes	Originally aired	
Season	Episodes	First aired	Last aired
1	13	September 14, 2002	March 1, 2003
2	13	August 23, 2003	July 5, 2004

=== Season 1 (2002–03) ===
No. overall	No. in season	Title	Animation Timing Directed by	Written by	Storyboard by	Original release date	Prod. code
1	1	"Home with Hector"	Ken Boyer, Becky Bristow, Richard Collado, Jung Yon Kwon, Robert Tyler	Story by : Alan Burnett and Marc Hyman; Teleplay by : Alan Burnett	Dell Barras, Ken Boyer, Dennis Woodyard	September 14, 2002	385-761-001
Set after the events of Osmosis Jones, Ozzy and Drix are transferred from Frank and into the body of a teenager named Hector Cruz. However, a mutated crustacean-like bacteria named Scarlet Fever is also transferred. Ozzy and Drix must capture him before he wreaks havoc on the City of Hector.
2	2	"Reflex"	Ken Boyer, Barbara Dourmashkin-Case, Karen Peterson, Nelson Recinos, Robert Tyler	Len Uhley	Dell Barras, Ken Boyer, Bob Camp, Shannon Denton, Ryan Woodward	September 21, 2002	385-762-002
Ozzy accidentally rams into a leg nerve with his car which ends up producing a nerve spasm that causes Hector to trip Ricky Sales, the school bully. When Ricky threatens to beat up Hector after school, Ozzy must figure out a way to help Hector defend himself, but unfortunately, he is thrown in prison after refusing to have his Private eye card confiscated by the Mayor. Ozzy then escapes prison and heads to the Cerebral Cortex to save Hector. Chief Gluteus then goes on the hunt to stop Ozzy, fearing that he will cause Hector to end up in the hospital.
3	3	"Strep-Finger"	Becky Bristow, Rich Collado, Jung Yon Kwon, Robert Tyler	Gene Grillo	Dell Barras, Ken Boyer, Shannon Denton, Ed LaRoche, Rhoydon Shishido, Keith Tucker	September 28, 2002	385-764-004
Ozzy becomes jealous of the super agent Penicillin G. who has been injected into Hector to track down a powerful germ known as Strepfinger, but takes it upon himself to finish the mission when the agent sacrifices himself to save Ozzy.
4	4	"A Lousy Haircut"	Kent Butterworth, Fred Miller, Kevin Petrilak, Robert Tyler	Joe Piscatella & Craig A. Williams	Dell Barras, Ken Boyer, Roy Burdine, Joseph Daniello, Mitchell Schauer	October 5, 2002	385-763-003
When Ozzy discovers there are lice eggs in Hector's hair from a recent haircut when a louse jumped off the barber's comb onto Hector's head, he and Drix venture onto the scalp to knock the eggs off before they hatch, only to end up running into the Louse. When Ozzy starts coagulating, Drix has to stop the lice and save Ozzy all at once.
5	5	"Oh, My Dog"	Kent Butterworth, Marlene May, Kevin Petrilak, Robert Tyler	Micah Wright	Dell Barras, Ken Boyer, Egidio Dal Chele, Larry Houston, Michael Swanigan, Dennis Woodyard	October 12, 2002	385-765-005
Drix's new pet dog, Dander, is mistaken for an allergen that is threatening the city, while, outside Hector, Mrs. Cruz thinks that it is Hector's dog causing the allergy that Hector is suffering from.
6	6	"Street Up"	Ken Boyer, Vincent Davis, Russell Mooney, Robert Tyler	Marc Gutman	Ken Boyer, Shannon Denton, Ed Fang, Dan Fausett, Roy Smith	October 19, 2002	385-766-006
Drix tries to learn how to act "street" and ends up helping a bacteria create a huge acne on Hector's face just in time for picture day.
7	7	"Gas of Doom"	Rebecca Bristow, Richard Collado, Barbara Dourmashkin-Case, Robert Tyler	Doug Langdale	Dell Barras, Ken Boyer, Shannon Denton, John Dorman, Garrett Ho, Mario Piluso, Rhoydon Shishido, Dennis Woodyard	November 9, 2002	385-768-008
Ozzy, Drix and Maria commandeer a submersible police craft into the intestines to stop a gas build-up that threatens Hector's social life and the Great White Bean appears as a result of Hector eating a bean casserole. Maria is desperate to stop the build up because one gas attack Hector had killed her father and she's determined to avenge him. However, a gang of rotaviruses captures the trio and ties them up with rope and, and they struggle to get free.
8	8	"Where There's Smoke"	Michael Gerard, Bob Nesler, Karen Peterson, Robert Tyler	Len Uhley	Dell Barras, Ken Boyer, Roy Burdine, Egidio Dal Chele, Joseph Daniello, Shannon Denton, Tec Manalac, Danny Taverna	November 16, 2002	385-767-007
Ozzy must keep the smooth-talking criminal Nick O'Teen from getting to the brain where he will cause Hector to smoke. However, Nick and his henchmen Tar, Carbon Monoxide and Butane kidnap him, the Chief and Spryman and takes over Hector's brain. Christine tries to convince Hector not to smoke.
9	9	"The Globfather"	Michael Gerard, Marlene May, Karen Peterson, Robert Tyler, Bill Wolf	Evan Gore & Heather Lombard	Dell Barras, Ken Boyer, Roy Burdine, Larry Houston, Bob Miller, Andy Schuhler, Dennis Woodyard	November 30, 2002	385-769-009
After eating a contaminated corn dog, Hector gets salmonella. Now Ozzy and Drix have to save the day and the mayor from the gangster Sal Monella.
10	10	"Ozzy Jr."	Kent Butterworth, Barbara Dourmashkin-Case, Bill Reed, Robert Tyler	Doug Langdale	Dell Barras, Ken Boyer, Shannon Denton, Bob Miller, Tom Morgan, Mitch Schauer, Dennis Woodyard	December 7, 2002	385-772-012
Ozzy thinks he's having a baby, but it turns out to be an infection from an intracellular listeria bacteria by returning villain Strepfinger. Ozzy and Drix must find a way to destroy the parasite growing within Ozzy before it spreads its infection to all of Hector. The parasite grows to monstrous proportions, before rampaging throughout the city infecting other cells along the way. It is eventually destroyed by the HPD when Drix finds out it cannot resist pastry products and tricks the bacteria into exiting Ozzy with a pie.
11	11	"Growth"	Michael Gerard, Bill Knoll, Bob Nesler, Robert Tyler	Marc Gutman	Dell Barras, Francis Barrios, Ken Boyer, Shannon Denton, Garrett Ho, Mario Piluso, Roy Smith, Dennis Woodyard	February 1, 2003	385-773-013
The Mayoral election is coming up and Spryman's opponent, a brain cell named Sylvian Fisher, is using a secret growth formula in order to cause destructive unnatural growth spurts and hurt the Mayor's image. Ozzy and Drix must stop this plan, which becomes more difficult when Sylvian takes the growth formula himself and becomes a raging and muscular monster.
12	12	"Sugar Shock"	Vincent Davis, Bob Nesler, Karen Peterson	Evan Gore & Heather Lombard	Francis Barrios, Garrett Ho, Rhoydon Shishido	February 8, 2003	385-771-011
Hector eats too much candy, attracting the French-accented leader of the carie army General Malaise. Now Ozzy and Drix, with the help of the Mole, must take on the bacterial army.
13	13	"The Dream Factory"	Ken Boyer, Phil Cummings, Vincent Davis	Gene Grillo	Dell Barras, Ken Boyer, Joe Daniello, Shannon Denton, John Fang, Garrett Ho, Bob Miller, Roy Smith, Dennis Woodyard	March 1, 2003	385-770-010
Hector has recurring nightmares after seeing a scary movie, keeping everyone in the City of Hector awake. Ozzy and Drix promptly go to the Subconscious Network, where dreams are produced, and enter Hector's nightmare in order to help him face his fear. Whatever happens to Ozzy and Drix in the dream happens for real.

=== Season 2 (2003–04) ===
No. overall	No. in season	Title	Written by	Storyboard by	Original release date	Prod. code
14	1	"An Out of Body Experience Part 1"	Doug Langdale	Bob Camp, Garrett Ho & John Fang	August 23, 2003	385-774-014
Ozzy accidentally gets transferred into Christine's body when she administered two rescue breaths on an unconscious Hector after he performed a reckless stunt off the pool's high dive to impress her. While there, Ozzy starts changing colors and acting feminine and gets arrested because they think he's a virus.
15	2	"An Out of Body Experience Part 2"	Story by : Alan Burnett and Doug Langdale; Teleplay by : Marc Gutman and Doug Langdale	Bob Camp, Garrett Ho & John Fang	August 30, 2003	385-777-017
Ozzy is still in Christine; using REM sleep (or Random Eye Movement), he calls Drix for help, which is when he learns he's gender morphing. Upon realizing a cell from a certain gender goes to a body of another gender, that cell becomes that gender, he seeks to escape. With Drix's plan, and the help of another Drixinol cold pill in Christine called "Drixeen", Ozzy returns to Hector and prevents Christine from catching pneumonia.
16	3	"Lights Out!"	Gene Grillo	John Fang & Bob Camp	September 6, 2003	385-778-018
Everyone inside Hector forgets who Ozzy and Drix are when Hector experiences a concussion, forcing them to locate the site of the concussion, so they can reboot Hector's memories before Hector crashes.
17	4	"The Conqueror Worm"	Len Uhley	John Fang & Joseph Daniello	September 13, 2003	385-775-015
Hector eats an under-cooked chorizo and gets sick to his stomach, leading him to getting two flatworms Trichinella spiralis in his body. The male worm dies, but the pregnant female survives. Ozzy, Drix and a captain must try to kill it before Hector's stomach is infected.
18	5	"Puberty Alert"	Ray DeLaurentis	Steve Daye & Bob Camp	September 20, 2003	385-780-020
Hector discovers hair growing on his chin, the testosterone gang ties up the Mayor and wreaks havoc, causing Hector to get into trouble, especially when sneaking out to an all night party in a dangerous part of town when his parents forbid it. Ozzy and Drix must stop the testosterone gang and save the Mayor.
19	6	"Tricky Ricardo"	Len Uhley	John Fang & Bob Camp	September 27, 2003	385-781-021
After getting injured on a police case, Maria is sent home to rest for the week. She decided to use this time to work on a family reunion coming up for her. Drix notices a rip on the corner of Maria's family picture. Maria doesn't seem to want to talk about it, but then her brother Ricky comes in and starts putting the puzzle pieces together. Maria and Ricky share their past with Drix which turns out as Ricky being the family troublemaker. Maria lost her trust in him so Drix decides to help Ricky get it back. He allows him to be a private eye along with Ozzy with good results and Ricky actually becomes one of the best. However, Ricky is working for Strepfinger, who plots to create a tumor out of Drix's medications, but now Ricky is reluctant to hurt Maria again.
20	7	"Auntie Histamine"	John P. McCann	Joesph Daniello & John Fang	October 4, 2003	385-779-019
Hector uses a nose spray to clear his congested nose and Drix's aunt Auntie Histamine appears. Suddenly, Hector's water levels drop and Ozzy realizes Drix's aunt is causing it, thanks to Hector's carelessness.
21	8	"A Growing Cell"	Steven Darancette	John Fang & Mitch Schauer	October 11, 2003	385-776-016
Hector is super-sizing at fast-food restaurants too much which not only makes him gain weight, but it also gives a cholesterol named Stickety Lipid, the chance to kidnap a fat cell family's child in an attempt to clog an artery. Ozzy and Drix (and the new navigational system, installed by Drix, named Backseat) must return the huge blob to his parents in time. Hector must also get in healthier shape.
22	9	"A Cold Day in Hector"	Ray DeLaurentis	Mike Dougherty & Bob Camp	October 25, 2003	385-784-024
While snowboarding with Travis, Hector crosses an off-limits area. Hector starts to freeride, but falls and rips his snowsuit. This causes a virus named Cryo to drop Hector's temperature. Ozzy and Drix were getting ready for a day at the beach, but now have to stop Cryo from making Hector die of hypothermia.
23	10	"Supplements" "Triumph of The Supplements"	Len Uhley	Mitch Schauer & Bob Camp	June 14, 2004	385-785-025
When Hector accidentally breathes in lead while helping his dad strip old paint off of a shed, the Lead Gang cause him to feel ill with lead poisoning. Drix then uses the Mayor's new control system to make Hector eat cereal so he can bring in the Supplements (Vitamin A, Vitamin B Complex, Iron, Vitamin D and Vitamin E) who ask him to be their sidekick.
24	11	"Double Dose"	Ray DeLaurentis	John Fang & Dave Smith	June 21, 2004	385-786-026
Ozzy goes into mitosis and a four-armed clone doubles from him, trying to steal the iodine that will allow Hector to grow.
25	12	"Nature Calls"	John Behnke and Rob Humphrey	Joseph Daniello, Caroline K. Hu, Renato "Joey" Otacan, Mario Piluso, Jason So & Byron Vaughns	June 28, 2004	385-782-022
Billy Blob Bile creates a detour away from the small intestine so bacteria will come to his hotel. Ozzy, Drix, and Maria, who are camping and forced to work at the hotel, must stop Bile before Hector's appendix bursts.
26	13	"Journey to the Center of the Tooth" "Cavities"	Story by : Paul Dini; Teleplay by : John P. McCann	Roy Burdine, Larry F. Houston, Scott Hudson, Dan C. Kubat, Fred Reyes & Scott Sackett	July 5, 2004	385-783-023
After Hector eats excessive sugar without brushing his teeth, he gets a cavity caused by General Malaise. Malaise plans to cause further pain when Hector goes to the dentist. During this, Drix must overcome his claustrophobia.

== Home media ==
The complete series was released on DVD on June 20, 2017, as manufactured on demand (MOD) on DVD-R and part of the Warner Archive Collection.

== Video game ==
A video game based on the series was developed by Raylight Studios and published by Midway Games for the Game Boy Advance in 2003. It is a side-scrolling platformer in which Ozzy and Drix must rescue Mayor Spryman from Strepfinger and his coalition of pathogens. The game received generally negative reviews from critics.
