= The Mangler 2 =

- DVD cover
- Directed by: Michael Hamilton-Wright
- Written by: Michael Hamilton-Wright
- Produced by: Glen Tedham
- Starring: Lance Henriksen; Chelse Swain; Philippe Bergeron; Dexter Bell; David Christensen; Jeff Doucette; Daniella Evangelista; Miles Meadows; Will Sanderson
- Cinematography: Nobert Kaluza
- Edited by: Anthony A. Lewis
- Music by: Ferocious Le Fonque
- Production companies: Banana Brothers Entertainment Inc. Barnholtz Entertainment; Mangler Productions
- Distributed by: Artisan Entertainment
- Release date: February 19, 2002
- Running time: 97 min.
- Country: Canada
- Language: English

The Mangler 2 (also known as The Mangler 2: Graduation Day) is a 2002 Canadian horror film and a direct-to-video sequel to the 1995 theatrical release The Mangler, which was based on a 1972 short story of the same name by Stephen King. It stars Lance Henriksen and Chelse Swain. While the original was about a demon-possessed industrial laundry-machine, this film places the demon in a private school's computer network, where it manifests as a destructive computer virus with some of the same abilities as a ouija board.

The film was critically panned for, among other things, its similarity to another King adaptation, The Lawnmower Man (whose producers King sued to remove his name from the marketing, given its threadbare connection to his original story), and lack of relevance to its predecessor.

== Plot ==
Joanne "Jo" Newton, a girl desperate for attention from her workaholic father, ends up going to an upper class private boarding school after she’s caught breaking into her dad's computer company. The school is getting ready to install a new security system. Jo and several others students are forced to remain behind while the others leave for Spring Break, as punishment from the school's Dean, Headmaster Bradeen (Lance Henriksen). However, Jo, with her knowledge of computers, hacks into the school's mainframe and unleashes a super virus called "Mangler 2.0" into the security system.

What nobody knows is that this virus literally has a mind of its own, and it controls everything around the school. At first, everybody thinks it is a blessing, but when the virus starts killing everyone in sight, the remaining students and staff attempt to escape from the building, which proves very difficult, as the virus is watching their every move. Bradeen is captured by the Mangler and has wires planted into his head turning him into a walking computer. With Bradeen at the virus' bidding, he is forced to go after the students.

Jo finally confronts the monster she unleashed which is now in the school's basement. Jo tricks the virus by distracting Bradeen with a non-violent program on creating new lives, featuring snowflakes. Then, she stabs him and pushes him against the supercomputer that he now no longer controls. The virus itself is destroyed as Bradeen dies. Having defeated the Mangler, Jo escapes the school with her bodyguard Paul, the chef, and her father.

Some time later, Jo goes on Spring Break in Europe. After getting a call from her father a message appears on the screen of Jo's cellphone saying "you've been mangled", implying that the virus is still alive.

== Cast ==
- Lance Henriksen as Headmaster Bradeen
- Chelse Swain as Joanne Newton
- Philippe Bergeron as Chef Lecours
- Dexter Bell as Will Walsh
- Daniella Evangelista as Emily Stone
- Miles Meadows as Corey Banks
- Will Sanderson as Dan Channa
- Jeff Doucette as Janitor Bob
- David Christensen as Paul Cody
- Ken Camroux-Taylor as Mr. Newton
- Garvin Cross as Mr. Vessey
- Brenda Campbell as Ms. Shaw
- Shawn Reis as Mr. Walsh
- David Horner as Voice of The Mangler

== Critical reception ==
The Mangler 2 received very negative reviews from critics and fans alike. It was criticized for its plot (which some see as being similar to that of The Lawnmower Man), the acting (with the exception of Henriksen's) and how it bore no relation whatsoever to the first film. AllMovie wrote: "Hardly a sequel to the Tobe Hooper version, [...] which wasn't all that good in the first place, The Mangler 2 showcases nothing but teen-horror genre shortcomings".
