= Lolita (1997 film) =

1997 film by Adrian Lyne

- Theatrical release poster
- Directed by: Adrian Lyne
- Screenplay by: Stephen Schiff
- Based on: Lolita by Vladimir Nabokov
- Produced by: Mario Kassar; Joel B. Michaels
- Starring: Jeremy Irons; Melanie Griffith; Frank Langella; Dominique Swain
- Cinematography: Howard Atherton
- Edited by: Julie Monroe; David Brenner
- Music by: Ennio Morricone
- Production company: Pathé
- Distributed by: The Samuel Goldwyn Company (United States); AMLF (France)
- Release dates: September 19, 1997 (San Sebastián); January 14, 1998 (France); July 22, 1998 (Los Angeles)
- Running time: 137 minutes
- Countries: United States; France
- Language: English
- Budget: $62 million
- Box office: $1.1 million (United States)

Lolita is a 1997 drama film directed by Adrian Lyne, written by Stephen Schiff, and starring Jeremy Irons, Dominique Swain, Melanie Griffith, and Frank Langella. The second screen adaptation of Vladimir Nabokov's 1955 novel, the film follows middle-aged professor Humber Humbert who is sexually attracted to adolescent girls he calls "nymphets". He rents a room in the house of young widow Charlotte to get closer to her 14-year-old daughter Dolores "Lo" Haze, whom he calls "Lolita". Obsessed with the girl, he eventually gains control over her after he takes her cross-country with him.

Compared to Stanley Kubrick's 1962 version, Lyne's film is more overt with many of the novel's darker elements; Kubrick chose to use suggestion and innuendo for comic purposes. Although praised by some critics for its faithfulness to Nabokov's narrative and the performances of Irons and Swain, the film received a mixed critical reception in the United States.

The film premiered at the 1997 San Sebastián International Film Festival. After struggling to secure an American distributor, Lolita premiered in the United States on the cable network Showtime on August 2, 1998, before its theatrical release on September 25 by The Samuel Goldwyn Company.

== Plot ==
In 1947, Humbert Humbert, a middle-aged European professor of English literature, travels to the United States to take a teaching position in New Hampshire. He rents a room in the home of widow Charlotte Haze, but only because he is sexually attracted to her 14-year-old daughter Dolores, whom he sees while touring the house. Obsessed with girls of approximately her age (whom he calls "nymphets"), Humbert is immediately smitten with Dolores, whom he nicknames "Lolita", and marries Charlotte only to be near her daughter.

While Lolita leaves for a summer camp, Charlotte finds Humbert's secret diary and discovers his preference for her daughter instead of her. Furious, Charlotte tells him that she is leaving him and that he can keep her home, but vows to make sure that he will never see Lolita again. She then runs out of the house, only to be hit by a car and killed. Humbert goes to the camp and eventually tells Lolita about her mother's death. Charlotte's death frees Humbert to groom Lolita. Humbert and Lolita then travel the country, staying in various motels before eventually settling in the college town of Beardsley, where Humbert takes a teaching job and Lolita begins attending Beardsley Prep School, an all-girls Catholic school.

Humbert must conceal the nature of his relationship with Lolita from everyone—strangers they encounter when traveling as well as the administration at Beardsley. He presents his relationship with Lolita to the world as a father and daughter. Over time, Lolita's increasing boredom with Humbert, combined with her growing desire for independence and realization of their relationship, fuels a constant tension that leads to a fight between them. Humbert's affection for Lolita is also rivaled by another man, playwright Clare Quilty, who has been pursuing Lolita since the beginning of the pair's travels. Lolita eventually escapes with Quilty, and Humbert's search for them is unsuccessful, especially as he does not know Quilty's name.

Three years later, Humbert receives a letter from Lolita asking for money. Humbert visits Lolita, who is now married and pregnant. Her husband, Richard, knows nothing about her past. Humbert asks her to run away with him, but she refuses. He gives her a substantial amount of money. Lolita also reveals to Humbert how Quilty actually tracked young girls and took them to Pavor Manor, his home in Parkington, to exploit them for child pornography. Quilty kicked her out of his mansion after she did not want to participate in films with other men. Lolita admits that she did not want to be with any man other than Quilty, stating, "He was the only man I was ever really crazy about".

After he visits Lolita, Humbert tracks down Quilty, who is in a drug-induced stupor, and murders him after chasing him around the mansion at gunpoint. After being chased by the police, Humbert is arrested and sent to prison for the murder. He dies in prison in November 1950 due to a coronary thrombosis, and Lolita dies the next month on Christmas Day from childbirth complications.

== Cast ==
- Jeremy Irons as Professor Humbert Humbert
  - Ben Silverstone as young Humbert
- Melanie Griffith as Charlotte Haze, Lolita's mother
- Frank Langella as Clare Quilty
- Dominique Swain as Dolores "Lolita" Haze
- Suzanne Shepherd as Miss Pratt
- Keith Reddin as Reverend Rigger
- Erin J. Dean as Mona
- Joan Glover as Miss LaBone
- Ed Grady as Dr. Melinik
- Michael Goodwin as Mr. Beale
- Angela Paton as Mrs. Holmes
- Emma Griffiths-Malin as Annabel Leigh
- Ronald Pickup as young Humbert's father
- Michael Culkin as Mr. Leigh
- Annabelle Apsion as Mrs. Leigh

== Production ==
=== Development ===
The first screen adaptation of Vladimir Nabokov's 1955 novel Lolita in 1962 was credited solely to Nabokov, although it was heavily revised by Stanley Kubrick and James Harris and was directed by Kubrick. The screenplay for the 1997 version, more faithful to the text of the novel than the earlier motion picture, is credited to Stephen Schiff, a writer for The New Yorker, Vanity Fair and other magazines. Schiff was hired to write it as his first movie script after the film's producers had rejected commissioned screenplays from the more experienced screenwriters and directors James Dearden (Fatal Attraction), Harold Pinter and David Mamet. According to Schiff:

Right from the beginning, it was clear to all of us that this movie was not a "remake" of Kubrick's film. Rather, we were out to make a new adaptation of a very great novel. Some of the filmmakers involved actually looked upon the Kubrick version as a kind of "what not to do." I had somewhat fonder memories of it than that, but I had not seen it for maybe fifteen years, and I didn't allow myself to go back to it again.

Schiff added that Kubrick's film might better have been titled Quilty, since the director had allowed the character of Clare Quilty (Peter Sellers) to "take over the movie". An early draft of the script reveals that, as in the novel, Dolores Haze (Dominique Swain) would be twelve years old at the beginning of the film. At an unknown stage, the age was changed to fourteen. To accommodate this, the story's timeline was compressed to three years instead of the novel's five, with the ending of the film taking place in 1950 instead of the original 1952. In the final film, Dolores' age (fourteen) is only clearly mentioned once, during a scene which, in the early drafts, would have taken place in 1949

=== Filming ===
Adrian Lyne states in the DVD commentary that he prefers location shooting even though it is more difficult in some respects, and that the home of Charlotte Haze (Melanie Griffith) was filmed in Wilmington, North Carolina.

== Release ==
Lolita premiered at the San Sebastián International Film Festival on September 19, 1997. It opened to the public in Italy on September 26, 1997.

In the United States, the film had a limited one-week theatrical run in Los Angeles beginning July 22, 1998. It was subsequently aired on the cable network Showtime on August 2, 1998, after very scarce promotion, and premiered at 9:00 p.m., with a brief introduction by Lyne. The following night, a Q&A with Lyne premiered along with a 16-minute making-of documentary, "The Lolita Story". Due to the difficulty in securing a distributor, the film received a limited theatrical run in the United States on September 25, 1998, in order to qualify for awards. Similarly, Lolita was met with much controversy in Australia, where it was not given a theatrical release until April 1999.

=== Home media ===
Showtime owned the film's U.S. distribution rights for five years until the contract's expiration in 2003. It was given a DVD release in the United States by Lionsgate on October 12, 1999, which was reissued in 2007.

The Australian home media distributor Imprint Films gave the film a limited edition region-free Blu-ray release on October 7, 2022.

== Reception ==
=== Box office ===
In Italy, the film grossed $676,987 from 98 screens in key Italian cities in its opening weekend, placing fourth at the Italian box office.

The film grossed $19,492 on its opening weekend in limited release in the United States, and $1,147,784 in total between the United States and Canada. against an estimated $62 million budget.

=== Critical response ===
On review aggregator Rotten Tomatoes, the film holds an approval rating of 69% based on 26 reviews, with an average rating of 7/10. The site's critical consensus reads: "If it can't quite live up to Nabokov's words, Adrian Lyne's Lolita manages to find new emotional notes in this complicated story, thanks in large part to its solid performances." Metacritic assigned the film a weighted average score of 46 out of 100, based on 17 critics, indicating "mixed or average" reviews.

James Berardinelli praised the performances of the two leads, Jeremy Irons and Swain, but he considered Griffith's performance weak, "stiff and unconvincing". He considered the film better when her character no longer appeared in it and concluded, "Lolita is not a sex film; it's about characters, relationships, and the consequences of imprudent actions. And those who seek to brand the picture as immoral have missed the point. Both Humbert and Lolita are eventually destroyed—what could be more moral? The only real controversy I can see surrounding this film is why there was ever a controversy in the first place."

The film was The New York Times' "Critics Pick" on July 31, 1998, with its critic Caryn James saying, "Rich beyond what anyone could have expected, the film repays repeated viewings...it turns Humbert's madness into art."

Commenting on differences between the novel and the film, Charles Taylor, in Salon, observes that "[f]or all of their vaunted (and, it turns out, false) fidelity to Nabokov, Lyne and Schiff have made a pretty, gauzy Lolita that replaces the book's cruelty and comedy with manufactured lyricism and mopey romanticism". Extending Taylor's observation, Keith Phipps concludes: "Lyne doesn't seem to get the novel, failing to incorporate any of Nabokov's black comedy—which is to say, Lolita's heart and soul".

=== Accolades ===
Award/association	Year	Category	Recipient(s) and nominee(s)	Result	Ref.
Chicago Film Critics Association	1999	Most Promising Actress	Dominique Swain	Nominated	
MTV Movie Awards	1999	Best Kiss	Jeremy Irons; Dominique Swain	Nominated	
National Board of Review	1998	Top Ten Films		7th place	
Online Film & Television Association	1999	Best Youth Performance	Dominique Swain	Nominated	
Young Artist Awards	1999	Best Performance by a Young Actress in a Mini-Series/Made for TV Film	Dominique Swain	Won	
YoungStar Awards	1999	Best Performance by a Young Actress in a Mini-Series/Made for TV Film	Dominique Swain	Nominated	

== Soundtrack ==
The film's soundtrack was composed by Ennio Morricone and released on the Music Box Records label. As the composer himself described the project: "With my music, I only had to follow on a high level the director's intentions to make Lolita a story of sincere and reciprocal love, even within the limits of the purity and malicious naiveté of its young subject."

All music is composed by Ennio Morricone

Lolita
No.	Title	Length
1.	"Lolita" (contains unreleased material)	4:15
2.	"Love in the Morning"	3:37
3.	"Ladies and Gentlemen of the Jury" (previously unreleased)	1:26
4.	"Take Me to Bed"	2:51
5.	"Togetherness / Lolita" (previously unreleased)	2:58
6.	"Requiescant"	2:10
7.	"Lolita on Humbert's Lap"	3:34
8.	"She had nowhere else to go"	3:19
9.	"What About Me"	1:41
10.	"Lolita" (contains unreleased material)	1:21
11.	"She had nowhere else to go" (previously unreleased)	1:56
12.	"Togetherness"	2:32
13.	"Lolita" (previously unreleased)	2:11
14.	"Quilty"	4:14
15.	"Love in the Morning" (previously unreleased)	2:01
16.	"She had nowhere else to go" (previously unreleased)	2:58
17.	"Togetherness / Lolita" (previously unreleased)	3:03
18.	"Requiescant (alternate)" (previously unreleased)	1:53
19.	"Lolita In My Arms"	1:37
20.	"She had nowhere else to go" (previously unreleased)	2:39
21.	"What About Me" (previously unreleased)	1:52
22.	"Love in the Morning" (previously unreleased)	1:36
23.	"Humbert's Diary"	2:57
24.	"Lolita" (previously unreleased)	1:15
25.	"Togetherness" (previously unreleased)	2:28
26.	"She had nowhere else to go" (previously unreleased)	3:42
27.	"Humbert on the Hillside"	1:42
28.	"Lolita" (previously unreleased)	1:30
29.	"Ladies and Gentlemen of the Jury"	2:20
30.	"Lolita (finale)"	4:07
Total length:		77:03

== Sources ==
- Black, Joel (2002). The Reality Effect: Film Culture and the Graphic Imperative. New York City, New York: Routledge. ISBN 0-415-93721-3.
- Gale, Steven H. (2003). Sharp Cut: Harold Pinter's Screenplays and the Artistic Process. Lexington, Kentucky: University Press of Kentucky. ISBN 978-0-8131-2244-1.
- Gale, Steven H., ed. (2001). The Films of Harold Pinter. Albany, New York: SUNY Press. ISBN 978-0-7914-4932-5.
- Hudgins, Christopher C. (2001). "Harold Pinter's Lolita: 'My Sin, My Soul'". In Gale, Steven H. (ed.). The Films of Harold Pinter. Albany, New York: SUNY Press. p. 123–146. ISBN 978-0-7914-4932-5.
- Hudgins, Christopher C. (2008). "Three Unpublished Harold Pinter Filmscripts: The Handmaid's Tale, The Remains of the Day, Lolita". In Gillen, Francis; Gale, Steven H. (eds.). The Pinter Review: Nobel Prize / Europe Theatre Prize Volume: 2005–2008. Tampa, Florida: University of Tampa Press. pp. 132–193. ISBN 978-1-879-85219-8.
- Schiff, Stephen (May 15, 1995). Lolita: Screenplay (Revised ed.) – via Internet Archive.
