= The Job (2003 film) =

- DVD cover
- Directed by: Kenny Golde
- Written by: Kenny Golde
- Produced by: Daniel and Marc Levin
- Starring: Daryl Hannah; Brad Renfro; Dominique Swain; Eric Mabius; Alex Rocco; Shawn Woods; Alanna Hanly
- Cinematography: Scott Kevan
- Edited by: Brian Anton
- Music by: Benjamin Newhouse
- Release date: May 16, 2003 (Cannes Film Festival)
- Running time: 83 minutes
- Country: United States
- Language: English

The Job is a 2003 American crime drama film directed and written by Kenny Golde Starring Daryl Hannah, Brad Renfro and Dominique Swain. Platform Entertainment's Dan Levin and Marc Levin produced Job, with Larry Gabriel as executive producer and Scott Sorrentino co-producing. The project was budgeted at less than $5 million.

== Plot ==
A hit woman is contracted to perform one final job before she leaves her life of cold-blooded killing behind forever. She is now faced with the challenge of dealing with carrying out the contract she accepted and her own moral values.

== Cast ==
- Daryl Hannah as Carol Jean "C.J." March
- Brad Renfro as Troy Riverside
- Dominique Swain as Emily Robin
- Eric Mabius as Rick
- Alex Rocco as Vernon Cray
- Shawn Woods as Roger Washington
- Alanna Hanly as Young C.
- Bruce Nozick as Hal
- Joseph Whipp as The Man
- Kiva Dawson as C.J.'s Mom
- Michelangelo Kowalski as Parker

== Release ==
The Job premiered at the Cannes Film Festival on May 16, 2003. However, it did not receive a theatrical release; instead, it was released straight-to-DVD on January 13, 2004, by Lionsgate Films.

== Reception ==
Ed Hulse of Video Business argues that The Job is "moderately entertaining albeit wildly improbable", and it benefits from "just enough gritty atmosphere and bloody action to sustain viewer interest", even though many character elements "don't quite jell" and the script needed tightening; still, he considered that Hannah's performance "makes her character believable", and despite uneven supporting performances the film has "enough merit to warrant a look-see".

According to OutNow, The Job starts from an appealing idea, presenting a "cool, sexy contract killer", but ultimately falls short, as "genuine suspense never quite emerges" and the plot remains "largely predictable", despite Daryl Hannah's convincing performance. The review criticizes the "almost grotesque" melodrama of some scenes and considers certain moments "utterly dispensable", while praising the interactions with former priest Rick as the film's strongest element. Regarding the DVD, OutNow finds the extras "acceptable", noting that the trailer "promises more than the film can deliver", but highlighting the cast biographies and behind-the-scenes feature as worthwhile additions.

=== Accolades ===
Award	Category	Nominee(s)	Result	Ref
Golden Trailer Awards	Trashiest	The Job	Nominated	
