= Nazis at the Center of the Earth =

2012 American science fiction war film

- Directed by: Joseph Lawson
- Written by: Paul Bales
- Produced by: David Michael Latt; David Rimawi; Paul Bales
- Starring: Dominique Swain; Jake Busey; Josh Allen; Christopher Karl Johnson
- Cinematography: Alex Yellen
- Edited by: Rob Pallatina
- Music by: Chris Ridenhour
- Distributed by: The Asylum
- Release date: April 24, 2012
- Running time: 90 minutes
- Country: United States
- Language: English

Nazis at the Center of the Earth (known as Bloodstorm in the United Kingdom) is a 2012 American direct-to-video science fiction war film produced by The Asylum that stars Dominique Swain and Jake Busey. It was released on April 24, 2012 on Blu-ray Disc and DVD.

== Plot ==
On May 10, 1945, in a secret airport near Wurtzberg, Germany, Nazi scientist Dr. Josef Mengele, along with fellow doctors and soldiers, prepare to depart to an unknown location with a mysterious package in their possession. They are soon ambushed by the Allied forces, but successfully escape.

In present day, a group of researchers in Antarctica, Dr. Paige Morgan among them, are abducted by a platoon of gas-masked soldiers wearing swastika armbands and dragged into a hidden environment in the center of the Earth. There, they discover that Dr. Josef Mengele and a group of surviving Nazi soldiers are plotting an invasion of the surface of the Earth to create a Fourth Reich.

== Cast ==
- Dominique Swain as Dr. Paige Morgan
- Jake Busey as Adrian Reistad
- Joshua Michael Allen as Lucas Moss
- Christopher Karl Johnson as Dr. Josef Mengele
- Lilan Bowden as May Yun
- Trevor Kuhn as Brian Moak
- Adam Burch as Mark Maynard
- Marlene Okner as Sije Lagesen
- Maria Pallas as Angela Magliarossa
- Andre Tenerelli as Aaron Blechman
- Abderrahim Halaimia as Rahul Jumani
- James Maxwell Young as Adolf Hitler

== Production ==
Lawson received the directorial assignment after reading the script and pitching himself as director in the fall of 2011. The film took less than four months to make. On Asylum, Lawson said "They are a low-budget film studio,[...] I knew pretty much going in that this was going to be a B movie. We had a 12-day shoot and a budget well south of $200,000."

The entire movie was storyboarded by the director shot for shot before production began in November 2011.

Locations for the film included Willow Studios in Los Angeles (underground in the Nazi bunker and Nifleheim Station), Blue Cloud Ranch in Santa Clarita (opening war night scenes and the cavern), and the Asylum Studios (hallways, labs, medical rooms, rappelling scenes and green screen virtual sets).

The film features one of the highest visual effects shot counts in an Asylum film, 379, and the effects were completed in just four weeks.

In his commentary, director Joseph J. Lawson cites as his visual influences Steven Spielberg, Peter Jackson, Sam Raimi, John Carpenter, John Landis, David Lean, J. J. Abrams and Robert Rodriguez.

== Reception ==
Critical and audience reaction to the film has been mixed with everything from "absolute garbage" to "the Citizen Kane of Asylum films".

The film was noted to be a mockbuster of the 2012 science fiction comedy Iron Sky due to common themes of remote Nazi groups surviving until the modern era. Coincidentally, Iron Sky: The Coming Race, the sequel to that film, was actually set in a fictitious center of the Earth.
