= Uncross the Stars =

2008 American comedy drama movie

- Directed by: Kenny Golde
- Written by: Ted Henning
- Starring: Daniel Gillies; Barbara Hershey; Ron Perlman
- Cinematography: Bry Thomas Sanders
- Edited by: Philip S. Miller
- Music by: Randy Miller
- Production companies: G2 Productions, Solipsist Film
- Release date: 5 April 2008
- Running time: 96 minutes
- Country: United States
- Language: English
- Budget: $1,000,000 (estimated)

Uncross the Stars is a 2008 film set in Arizona starring Daniel Gillies, Barbara Hershey, Ron Perlman, and Irma P. Hall. It was directed by Kenny Golde and written by Ted Henning.

== Plot ==
A young man called Troy (Gillies) grieving from the loss of his wife, is asked by his Aunt Hilda (Hershey) to build her a porch on her house in a desert community in Arizona, where he interacts with the colorful locals and tries to find reconciliation.

== Cast ==
- Daniel Gillies as Troy
- Barbara Hershey as Hilda
- Ron Perlman as Bobby
- Irma P. Hall as Lulu
- Pat Crawford Brown as Norma
- Linda Porter as Phyllis
- Takayo Fischer as Tina
- Jane Shayne as Mildred
- Suzanne Ford as Joyce
- Princess Lucaj as Linda
- Elizabeth Tulloch as Corrine (credited as Bitsie Tulloch)
- Jason Hillhouse as Willy
- Patrick Thomas O'Brien as Priest (credited as Patrick O'Brien)
- Franc Ross as Hack
- Paul Keith as Lawrence Hutchinson

== Reception ==
DVD Talk said it was "beautifully filmed" but overall found it "cliche(d)" and gave it a negative review. The Dove Foundation called it "a very charming movie."

== Home media ==
A DVD transfer of Uncross the Stars was released in Australia by Flashback Entertainment (Cat 33178).
