= Chelse Swain =

American actress (born 1983)

- Born: Chelse Elizabeth Ashley Swain; May 25, 1983 (age 43); Los Angeles, California, U.S.
- Occupation: Actress
- Years active: 1999–present

Chelse Elizabeth Ashley Swain (born May 25, 1983) is an American actress, best known for playing Bonnie Lisbon in the 1999 American film The Virgin Suicides. Her older sister is the actress Dominique Swain. Chelse co-starred with her sister in the film Tart.

== Filmography ==
Year	Title	Role	Notes
1999	The Virgin Suicides	Bonnie Lisbon	
2001	Tart	Heather Strum	
2002	The Mangler 2	Jo Newton	Video
2002	Judging Amy	Anna	2 episodes: "The Cook of the Money Pot" "Boston Terriers from France"
2006	Tom's Nu Heaven	Catholic School Girl	
2006	The Naked Ape	Susie	
2007	Georgia Rule	June Smith	
2007	Sands of Oblivion	Carrie	TV movie
2008	Unrequited	Nikki	Short film
2008	The Shield	Abigail	Episode: "Animal Control"
2008	Unrequited	Nikki	Short film
2012	Southern dysComfort	Michael's Daughter Mary Catherine	Short film
