= Sharkansas Women's Prison Massacre =

- Directed by: Jim Wynorski
- Written by: William Dever; Jim Wynorski; Corey Landis (additional material)
- Produced by: Rafael Diaz-Wagner; Steven Louis Goldenberg; Executive producers: Alberto Delgado Jr. Alex Nuñez
- Starring: Dominique Swain; Traci Lords
- Cinematography: David M. Rakoczy
- Edited by: Tony Randel
- Music by: Chuck Cirino
- Production company: Caluv Films
- Distributed by: CineTel Films; Syfy (TV)
- Release date: May 3, 2016
- Running time: 84 minutes
- Country: United States
- Language: English

Sharkansas Women's Prison Massacre is a 2016 American science fiction action horror film directed by Jim Wynorski and starring Dominique Swain and Traci Lords. It was released direct-to-DVD in the U.S. on May 3, 2016.

== Plot ==
Two employees for Arkansas Fracking Industries (AFI), Fred and Sam are busy detonating explosives near the Arkansas State Prison for Women when they inadvertently release a shark covered in spikes into the surrounding swamp. As five inmates, Anita, Michelle, Sarah, Shannon, and Samantha, load up in a transport vehicle, the shark kills Fred and Sam. Detectives Kendra and Adam, comb the swamps for someone and find an overturned canoe, next to some human remains. Under the canoe is a man blabbering “shark” repeatedly. The corrections officers and 5 prisoners arrive at an area of the swamp where the prisoners are required to remove tree stumps. Samantha bribes Mike to let her go wash off her arm in the nearby creek and she is eaten by the shark. Mike searches for her, finds only bloody clothes, and radios into the warden that she has escaped. Heading back to the prison, Anita's girlfriend Honey, hijacks the van and forces the two officers into the back with the others allowing Anita up front. Kendra and Adam overhear on their scanner about the hijacking. Honey and Anita stop to change vehicles and make the women change. Mike escapes into the swamp but is eaten by the shark.

The prisoners arrive at a house where Honey has killed the occupant for them to hide out temporarily. While there, the girls argue amongst themselves and Sarah goes outside to the nearby creek when the shark appears. She runs off but the shark is able to burrow through the mud and bites her leg off. She bleeds out crawling back to the house and Michelle finds her body outside. They discover her severed leg nearby with a shark's tooth embedded in it, when suddenly two geologists, Professor Orville and his assistant John, emerge from the trees saying their car was destroyed by a land shark. The geologists theorize that nearby explosions and fracking opened a “superhighway” between Earth's surface and an underground ocean, releasing a predator capable of hunting on land and in water. They try to make it to the van but the shark tunnels through the dirt forcing them back inside the house. Michelle uncovers a secret stash of assault weapons in the house and everyone takes a gun.

Outside, they discover there are several sharks now but spot a cave entrance off the back of the property. They use some of their ammunition's gunpowder to create a makeshift bomb with clothes they soak in some blood Carl volunteers. This creates a distraction for them to run to the cave. When Orville sprains his ankle, John sacrifices himself so Carl and Honey can help the professor. Detectives Kendra and Adam arrive at the cabin but are attacked by the sharks and are forced to drive off. Inside the cafe, the others hear the sharks communicating the same way as whales. They discover a shaft of daylight and resolve to use a blow up raft they have to cross it when Orville gets eaten by a shark. In pairs, they make it across the water. Honey and Anita are the last to cross and Anita decides to shoot at Carl, Shannon, and Michelle as they are nearing the shore which causes her to lose her balance and fall into the water. Sharks attack, eating her and Honey while Shannon is struck by one of Anita's bullets and killed. Carl allows Michelle to leave. The detectives, who found maps of the cave somehow online, drive up to the exit where Carl is standing and they ask about the prisoners and Carl reports them all as dead. Kendra, at this point is obsessing over "land sharks" and asks if Carl knows what they are up against and he nods. The final scene shows Honey crawling out from the water, having survived the shark attack before looking at the camera to deliver her catchphrase “crap on a cracker”.

== Cast ==
- Skye McDonald as Sarah Mason - Prisoner 366429 "Aggravated assault, armed robbery, & resisting arrest"
- Christine Nguyen as Michelle Alika - Prisoner 5678672 "Bootlegging videos & inter-state flight"
- Amy Holt as Shannon Hastings - Prisoner 9328940 "Assault & battery"
- Tabitha Marie as Samantha Pines - Prisoner 5678672 "Drug trafficking & possession" (Samantha and Michelle are introduced having the same prisoner numbers)
- Cindy Lucas as Anita Conners - Prisoner 2983747 "Prostitution & drug trafficking"
- Dominique Swain as Honey - Anita's girlfriend
- Traci Lords as Detective Kendra Patterson
- Corey Landis as Detective Adam
- John Callahan as Carl, Corrections Officer
- Serafin Falcon as Mike, Corrections Officer - his uniform badge reads "V. Ghambarai" though everyone in the film calls him "Mike"
- Chris de Christopher as Professor Orville
- Oscar de la Rosa as John Raden
- Steven Louis Goldberg as Sam - an Arkansas Fracking Institute Employee, opens a doorway to an underground ocean, eaten by shark
- Robert Hummel as Fred - an Arkansas Fracking Institute Employee, opens a doorway to an underground ocean, eaten by shark

== Production ==
Wynorski said the idea for the film came to him when he was in the shower. The movie was made at Florida's Caverns State Park, a location Wynorski enjoyed so much that he later used it for CobraGator. The film had a Kickstarter campaign to raise production funds, but at the campaign's end on September 27, 2013, it had only raised $598. In an interview, director Jim Wynorski stated his disdain for crowd funding, saying this of the Kickstarter: "I was forced to try it recently, but I knew in my heart it was going to be a useless venture… which it was".

=== Release ===
Sharkansas Women's Prison Massacre was released on DVD and Blu-ray on May 3, 2016. The Blu-Ray comes with a feature-length commentary with Jim Wynorski and actresses Cindy Lucas, and Amy Holt, where they share anecdotes from the film's production. It was distributed by Shout! Factory under their Scream! Factory brand.

== Reception ==
The B-Movie Film Vault gave the film 2.5 out of 5 stars in a review from around the film's release in 2016. The review states enthusiasm for combination of the two subgenera derived from the title, "women in prison films" and "killer shark films", although states that "unfortunately, this movie failed to meet my (not so lofty) expectations". The review goes on to say that the effects and story are lacking despite the presence of some established actors like Traci Lords and Corey Landis (whose inclusion in the movie, this reviewer concludes, serves no purpose other than to pad the total runtime) and that it could have been "a hugely entertaining exploitation flick, but it just plays things way too safe".

Cinema-Crazed.com gave the film a mostly negative review, saying "the consistent utterance of Dominique Swain’s character to herself of "Crap on a Cracker", just about sums up Jim Wynorski's latest turkey that mixes "Con Air" and "Tremors". The review also references the inclusion of Traci Lords and Corey Landis' characters provide "zero purpose to the overall arc, save for some odd moments". Despite the scattered and confusing plot, ultimately the review argues the film is "a short and sweet piece of trash with endless eye candy".

HorrorNews.net did not recommend the film in their review from 2016. The review states that Jim Wynorski was once reliable when it came to delivering "a good B-movie; pure unpretentious fun – no strings attached" however, he failed to do so with Sharkansas. They argue the film's outrageous title leads the viewer to expect "Piranha 3D, but with bigger, meaner fish", but this is sorely misleading. The review makes note of Wynorski's history in pornographic films and the inclusion of multiple adult film actresses and points out the lack of exploitative nudity (often found in prison films) and violence (with less than 6 victims) as reasons the movie doesn't live up to its title. The "worst part" was the film's open ending meaning a likely inevitable sequel.

CultureCrypt.Com provided an in depth review of the film that initially cites the film's failed Kickstarter campaign as foreshadowing for the disappointing final product. The review also acknowledges continuity errors such as Mike's name tag inexplicably reading "V. Ghambari" and describes the script as "functional, or, as functional as is required to constitute a basic movie". This review also points out the unnecessary Lords and Landis subplot that "conspicuously as well as somewhat hilariously, never intersects with the women inmates at all". The reviewer concludes that "for movies like Sharkansas Women’s Prison Massacre, a "Does It Really Matter?" or "What Do You Expect?" icon ought to be used instead of stars or a numerical rating system" but ultimately awarded it a 50/100.
