= Tart (film) =

2001 film by Christina Wayne

- Theatrical release poster
- Directed by: Christina Wayne
- Written by: Christina Wayne
- Produced by: Patrick Choi; Nile Niami
- Starring: Dominique Swain; Brad Renfro; Bijou Phillips; Nora Zehetner; Mischa Barton; Alberta Watson; Michael Murphy; Melanie Griffith
- Cinematography: Stephen Kazmierski
- Edited by: Ray Hubley
- Music by: Jeehun Hwang
- Production companies: Green Moon Productions; Interlight Pictures
- Distributed by: Lionsgate
- Release date: June 15, 2001
- Running time: 94 minutes
- Countries: United States; Canada
- Language: English
- Budget: $3.3 million

Tart is a 2001 American coming-of-age drama film written and directed by Christina Wayne and starring Dominique Swain, Brad Renfro, and Bijou Phillips. It follows a young woman at a preparatory school in 1980s New York City and her ingratiation with a group of elite peers. It was released by Lionsgate in 2001.

== Plot ==
In 1984, Catherine "Cat" Storm is a teenager attending an elite preparatory school in Manhattan. Her mother seems strict and cold, her father is absent from her life, and her little brother is a hypochondriac. Her best friend is Delilah Milford, a free-spirited delinquent whose father is a major stockholder in ShopRite.

After Delilah is expelled from school for drug possession, Cat befriends Grace Bailey, an English exchange student who helps her get in with the popular crowd. The pair begin to attend high-brow parties thrown by queen bee Peg, where a gay ephebophile named Kenny supplies the attending teenagers with cocaine. Cat doesn't participate in her friends' drug use, which many of them look down on her for, but she is defended by William Sellers, a childhood friend from dance class. She quickly grows infatuated with William for seeming so sensitive and attentive to her. Meanwhile, Delilah grows resentful of Cat for abandoning her, sending her dead flowers on her birthday.

While partying, Cat's new friends gossip about the string of jewellery thefts happening in their apartments. They also find out Delilah's father has been arrested for kidnapping, after which they mock the Milford family's dysfunctions. Cat and William skip school for a walk in the park, where William opens up about his addiction. Later, Cat tells her mother that William has asked her out to Peg's upcoming Christmas party. When William arrives to pick Cat up, he watches from the entryway as the pair argue, with Ms. Storm harshly expressing her awareness and disapproval of the boy's delinquency. Cat insists he's a good person and storms off to the party.

Peg's party is crashed by Delilah, who confronts Cat in the bathroom before defecating in the group's ice bucket and leaving. William pressures Cat into taking drugs, and feeling suffocated by her difficult home life, she goes overboard and experiences a blackout. The pair have sex, and an inebriated Cat confesses her last name is a pseudonym and her father is really Jewish.

The next day, Cat returns to her worried sick mother, who accuses her of borrowing an expensive pair of earrings without permission. This leads to another argument, and Cat is quick to storm out once more. She tries to find William, getting a glimpse of his abusive, impoverished household in the process. They meet at a local recreation center, where William is suddenly acting cruel towards Cat for seemingly no reason. While trying to blow her off, an expensive watch falls from his hoodie pocket, and Cat realizes he's the one stealing jewellery from everyone's apartments, including her mother's earrings.

Cat tries to tell Grace that William is the thief, only to get the cold shoulder from her. All of Cat's friends start ignoring her at school, and she hears from a peer named Eloise that William has been telling everyone about their intercourse at the Christmas party. Cat tries to confront Grace, who reveals that William also told everyone about her secret Jewish lineage, which makes Grace no longer want to associate with her. Suddenly ostracized, Cat starts trying to reconnect with Delilah, but can't find her anywhere.

Still avoiding her mother, Cat falls asleep in the lobby of Delilah's building. She's awoken by Eloise, who's going to The Hamptons with her family. Cat tags along after hearing Delilah will be at a party in the countryside. She successfully finds an inebriated Delilah at the beach party and apologizes for abandoning her. The two make amends, and Delilah walks to a nearby gay bar to ask Kenny for a ride back to the city. There, she witnesses Kenny pocketing all the stolen jewellery that William has sold to him. While leaving, she stumbles upon William receiving fellatio from a male drug dealer. Fretting over how much Delilah has just seen, William chases her into the woods and tries to explain himself. Things escalate until he pushes her, causing her to hit her head on a rock. Delilah screams at him and threatens to press charges, and in a panic, he beats her to death.

After Delilah's sudden disappearance, Cat is forced to return to Eloise's house alone. Delilah's corpse is found the next morning, and William is swiftly arrested. Reporters interview the students with questions about Delilah, and they all deem her "reckless" and have little to say of her. Grace and Peg continue to defend William following his incarceration. Devastated and grieving, Cat makes amends with her mother, finally realizing her family is there for her if no one else is.

== Cast ==
- Dominique Swain as Cat Storm
- Brad Renfro as William Sellers
- Bijou Phillips as Delilah Milford
- Mischa Barton as Grace Bailey
- Alberta Watson as Lily Storm
- Myles Jeffrey as Pete Storm
- Scott Thompson as Kenny
- Michael Murphy as Mike Storm
- Nora Zehetner as Peg
- Jacob Pitts as Toby Logan
- Chelse Swain as Heather Strum
- Lacey Chabert as Eloise Logan
- Melanie Griffith as Diane Milford

== Production ==
Though set in New York, the film was shot in New York City, New York and Toronto, Ontario, Canada in 1999. Anna Paquin was originally cast as Cat Storm. She dropped out of the lead role in favor of X-Men.

== Reception ==
The reviewer for AllMovie wrote that "Tart is a straightforward depiction of self-possessed, spoiled teens, is the best argument yet for getting an after-school job in the late high school years". The reviewer for PopMatters wrote that "Tart is another in a long line of unoriginal attempts to explore one girl’s desire to fit in."

The reviewer for Cinema.com wrote that "The end really isn't an ending. It makes the audience wonder, that's it. There is no real plot, focus, direction or point. It is really not worth seeing." In contrast, the reviewer for the website Through the Shattered Lens actually liked the film, even though she called it a "massively flawed film".

Robert Pardi of TV Guide gave the film a middling review, writing: "In this blast at the privileged classes, yet another young social climber discovers the bitter accuracy of F. Scott Fitzgerald's observation about the very rich: "They are different from you and me"... But this expose doesn't elicit much sympathy for characters whose big dreams amount to little more than lust for a better grade of cashmere." Contactmusic.com gave the film a negative review, writing: "Not only does the provocative title of Tart mislead us, but the packaging features a lithe Dominique Swain on its covers, her schoolgirl skirt blowing up to expose her panties... The structure of the film is nonexistent (and in other words, there's little plot to hold together a series of oddball scenes), and the acting is perfunctory -- Mischa Barton's horrendous British accent a grating exercise in poor voice coaching and a director too in love with her own material to even notice."

A review published in The Massachusetts Daily Collegian was critical of the film, noting: "Writer-director Christina Wayne has so little clue about how to make a film that none of the relationships between seems remotely understandable. Characters float in and out with little connection to each; every scene the viewer needs to reestablish who everyone is in relation to one another."

=== Accolades ===
Award	Category	Nominee(s)	Result
DVD Exclusive Awards	Best Actress	Dominique Swain	Nominated

== Home media ==
The film was released in DVD on April 23, 2002. It is also included on streaming service, Prime Video.
