= Christina Wayne =

American film director, screenwriter, and producer

Christina Wayne is an American network executive, television producer, and screenwriter. She is the managing director of MBC Studios, and has previously worked at AMC, Cineflix Studios, and Amazon Studios Throughout her career, Wayne has developed and produced various television series, including Mad Men and Breaking Bad.

== Career ==
Wayne began her career as a screenwriter working in Hollywood. Under the mentorship of producer Robert Evans, she directed music videos and wrote the E! True Hollywood Story about actress Dominique Dunne. She also wrote and directed the 2001 film Tart for Lionsgate, set in an Upper East Side private school in Manhattan.

Wayne returned to New York City in 2005 and initially joined AMC as a consultant, and later became an executive.

One of her earliest contributions at AMC was producing the miniseries Broken Trail, a western TV film starring Robert Duvall and Thomas Haden Church. The series drew 9.8 million viewers and won four Emmy awards in 2007, including Outstanding Miniseries. This was Wayne's first Emmy for producing a miniseries. She would go on to win many more Emmys for developing shows.

At AMC, she also oversaw the development and production of various shows such as Mad Men (2007), Breaking Bad (2008), and Hell on Wheels (2011), on which she worked with Endemol in the show's early developmental stages.

After her time at AMC, Wayne became the president of Cineflix Studios. One of her projects at Cineflix was Copper, a crime series set in New York during the 1860s.

Wayne served as the CEO of Assembly Entertainment from 2013 to 2019. She oversaw the development and production of television projects, including the pilot order from YouTube for It's a Man's World, a half-hour comedy addressing gender inequality in the gaming industry, written by Theresa Rebeck. Her other projects during this time included I'm Dying Up Here for Showtime, MDX, an international medical disaster thriller co-produced with Tony Krantz's Flame Ventures, and Mercury 13, an event series in collaboration with Jessica Chastain.

Wayne joined Amazon Studios in 2019, where she worked on LOL, a reboot of The Kids In The Hall, and Three Pines.

In 2023, Wayne was appointed managing director of MBC Studios, the production arm of the Middle East broadcaster MBC Group. She oversees productions in Saudi Arabia, including projects such as The Devil's Promise and Desert Warrior.

== Credits ==
Year	Title	Role	Category
1997	E! True Hollywood Story	Writer and producer	TV series
2001	Tart	Writer and director	Film
2006	Broken Trail	Executive producer	TV miniseries
2007-09	Mad Men	Network executive	TV series
2008-10	Breaking Bad	Network executive	TV series
2009	The Prisoner	Executive producer	TV miniseries
2012-13	Copper	Executive producer	TV series
2017	Will	Consulting producer	TV series
2017-18	I'm Dying Up Here	Executive producer	TV series
2018	It's a Man's World (pilot)	Executive producer	TV series
2022	The Kids in the Hall	Studio executive	TV series
2022	The Lake	Studio executive	TV series
2022	Three Pines	Studio executive	TV series
