= Heart of America (film) =

- DVD release cover
- Directed by: Uwe Boll
- Written by: Robert Dean Klein
- Story by: Uwe Boll
- Produced by: Shawn Williamson; Wolfgang Herold
- Starring: Jürgen Prochnow; María Conchita Alonso; Clint Howard; Miles Meadows; Brendan Fletcher; Lochlyn Munro; Will Sanderson; Maeve Quinlan; Patrick Muldoon; Michael Pare Elisabeth Rosen
- Cinematography: Mathias Neumann
- Edited by: David Richardson
- Music by: Reinhard Besser
- Release date: September 5, 2002 (Oldenburg International Film Festival)
- Running time: 87 minutes
- Countries: Canada; Germany
- Language: English

Heart of America (also released as Home Room) is a 2002 Canadian-German drama film directed by Uwe Boll and written by Robert Dean Klein about the events leading up to and revolving around a shooting on the final day of school. The film features an ensemble cast including Jürgen Prochnow, Michael Paré, Elisabeth Moss, Patrick Muldoon, Clint Howard, and Brendan Fletcher. The film also addresses the issue of school bullying.

== Plot ==
The last day of school contains many problems for both teachers and students of Riverside High School, and there are multiple storylines about this.

The principal, Harold Lewis, must discipline English teacher William Pratt, who has let his professional frustrations get the better of him, while guidance counselor Vanessa Jones attempts to get through to student drug dealer Wex Presley, who is ruining her students.

Meanwhile, Principal Lewis' daughter, Karen, is having trouble with her boyfriend, Tommy Bruno, outcast Dara McDermott craves drugs, a pregnant girl named Robin Walters argues with her boyfriend, Kevin Rhodes about her future options; and bully Ricky Herman begins to recognize the consequences of his actions.

Unbeknownst to these people, two bullied students and best friends Daniel Lynne and Barry Shultz are about to shoot up the school as an act of revenge against their tormentors. Barry, however, is having second thoughts, while the seething Daniel prepares to unleash his rage. Daniel decides to attack his high school on the last day, insisting that he does not care if he lives or dies, tired of constant harshness and abuse from his uncaring father, Artie and from bullies at school; Ricky among them. On the last day, Daniel carries out his plan, aided by Dara who spontaneously joins him. Daniel confronts three of his past tormentors: Paul, Ricky, and Jeff and kills them. Kevin is shot and killed when he and Robin come into the line of fire, much to Daniel's regret while Robin is spared. Meanwhile, Dara walks into her English class and kills Mr. Pratt, and Karen, who had been a rival for the attentions of Tommy. Dara is then subdued by bully Donny Pritzee and is turned over to the police. Barry walks away from the school, having bailed out on the plan, believing there are other responses to the abuse he and Daniel suffered in the past. A lone gunshot then rings out as Daniel commits suicide.

As the film ends, a reporter informs the public of the school shooting, revealing that Daniel committed suicide, and the camera turns away from the TV to show Barry's and Daniel's shocked parents watching. At Daniel's home, the phone begins to ring, but Artie cannot bring himself to pick it up. The film then ends as a voice lists off major incidents of violence perpetrated by minors.

== Cast ==
- Jürgen Prochnow as Principal Harold Lewis
- Michael Pare as William Pratt
- Patrick Muldoon as Ryan Kirkland
- Kett Turton as Daniel Lynne
- Elisabeth Moss as Robin Walters
- Maria Conchita Alonso as Vanessa Jones
- Clint Howard as Arthur "Artie" Lynne
- Brendan Fletcher as Ricky Herman
- Lochlyn Munro as the reporter
- Maeve Quinlan as Becky Schultz
- Elisabeth Rosen as Dara McDermott
- Will Sanderson as Frank Herman
- G. Michael Gray as Wex Presley
- Kevin Mundy as Tommy Bruno
- Michael Belyea as Barry Shultz
- Stephanie MacGillivray as Karen Lewis
- Alejandro Rae as Paul
- Matthew MacCaull as Donald "Donny" Pritzi
- Steve Byers as Jeff
- Miles Meadows as Kevin Rhodes
- Christopher Marvrikos as Lenny
- Chilton Crane as Helena Pratt
- Spencer Achtymichuk as James Pratt
- Lesley Ewen as Ms. Weinberg
- Birgit Stein as Mrs. Hall
- Lily Shavick as Paula
- Michaela Mann as Slow White
- Chris Jovick as Kenny
- Justin Stillwell as Joe
- Mike Savage as Dave
- Benjamin Derrick as the mailman
- Brad Loree as a man with a mask
- Brent Connolly, Richard Kahan, and John Kralt as additional students
- Nick Allen, David Ferguson, Gary Ferguson, and Dustin Brooks as "small students"

== Reception ==
=== Release ===
Heart of America has a 20% 'rotten' rating on Rotten Tomatoes based on 5 reviews.

=== Critical response ===
Richard Propes of The Independent Critic wrote in his review: "I will say, in all honesty, that if I had not seen "Elephant" prior to this film I'd have been tempted to grace this film with a C−. In some ways, it tries and does take a rather unique approach (if overwhelming) to telling the story."
