= Osmosis Jones =

2001 live-action/animated film

- Theatrical release poster
- Directed by: Bobby Farrelly (Note: Live Action segments.); Peter Farrelly; Tom Sito (Note: Animated segments.); Piet Kroon
- Written by: Marc Hyman
- Produced by: Dennis Edwards; Bobby Farrelly; Peter Farrelly; Zak Penn; Bradley Thomas
- Starring: Chris Rock; Laurence Fishburne; David Hyde Pierce; Brandy Norwood; William Shatner; Molly Shannon; Chris Elliott; Bill Murray
- Cinematography: Mark Irwin
- Edited by: Lois Freeman-Fox; Stephen Schaffer; Sam Seig
- Music by: Randy Edelman
- Production companies: Warner Bros. Feature Animation; Conundrum Entertainment
- Distributed by: Warner Bros. Pictures
- Release dates: August 7, 2001 (premiere); August 10, 2001 (United States)
- Running time: 95 minutes
- Country: United States
- Language: English
- Budget: $70 million
- Box office: $14 million

Osmosis Jones is a 2001 American live-action/animated buddy cop action comedy film directed by the Farrelly brothers (Peter and Bobby Farrelly) and written by Marc Hyman starring the voices of Chris Rock, Laurence Fishburne, David Hyde Pierce, Brandy Norwood and William Shatner, with Molly Shannon, Chris Elliott and Bill Murray in live-action roles. It combines live-action sequences directed by the Farrelly Brothers and animated ones directed by Piet Kroon and Tom Sito and follows the titular protagonist, an anthropomorphic white blood cell police officer (Rock), as he teams up with a cold pill (Pierce) to protect his unhealthy human host (Murray) from a deadly virus (Fishburne) he unintentionally contracted.

Filming for the live-action sequences took place in Plymouth, Massachusetts from April 2, 2000 to June 19, 2000. Although originally expected to be released in November 2000, it premiered on August 7, 2001 and was theatrically released three days later by Warner Bros. Pictures. It received mixed reviews from critics, who praised the worldbuilding, animation, story, and voice performances, but criticized the inconsistent tone of the live-action portions and overuse of gross-out humor. The film was also a commercial failure, grossing $14 million worldwide against a $70 million budget. Despite the poor financial response, the film garnered success on home video, followed by an animated television series Ozzy & Drix, starring Phil LaMarr and Jeff Bennett as the voices of the titular characters and aired on Kids' WB for two seasons and 26 episodes from September 14, 2002 to July 5, 2004. The film has since gained a cult following.

== Plot ==
Frank DeTorri, an unkempt zookeeper at the Sucat Memorial Zoo in Rhode Island, struggles with the loss of his late wife by overeating and foregoing basic hygiene, much to the concern and irritation of his 10-year-old daughter Shane. Inside Frank's body, white blood cell Osmosis "Ozzy" Jones is an overzealous officer for the "Frank Police Department," its immune system. Incumbent mayor Phlegmming doubles down on his junk food policies, so he could go to a food festival in Buffalo, New York, ignoring its effects on Frank's health, causing Frank to eat a filth-covered boiled egg, allowing Thrax, a deadly virus known mainly as "The Red Death," to enter his body and inflame his throat. Phlegmming instructs Frank to take a cold pill, Special Agent Drixenol "Drix" Drixobenzometaphedramine, who proceeds to disinfect the throat, covering up evidence of Thrax's arrival.

Ozzy is told to assist Drix in his investigation, much to his displeasure. Thrax assumes leadership of a gang of sweat germs and breaks down Frank's mucus dam, nearly killing the duo and inciting a runny nose. Ozzy tells Drix how he once caused Frank to vomit on Shane’s science and physical education teacher, Mrs. Boyd, at a school science fair after Frank ate a contaminated oyster which led to Frank's dismissal from his previous job and Boyd filing a restraining order against him; Frank’s brother, Bob, had gotten him his current job at the zoo and Ozzy was suspended for unnecessary force.

Ozzy and Drix visit Chill, a flu vaccine and informant, who directs them to Thrax's hideout in a germ-ridden nightclub in a large zit on Frank's forehead. Ozzy goes undercover and infiltrates Thrax's gang, where he learns that Thrax intends to masquerade as a common cold and use his knowledge of human DNA to kill Frank. When Ozzy is discovered, Drix comes to his aid, causing a brawl which culminates in the zit being popped in the chaos. Its pus lands on Boyd's lip during a meeting between her and Frank when he attempts to have the restraining order temporarily lifted so he can attend a school trip with his daughter. In response, Phlegmming closes the investigation, dismisses Ozzy from the police force and orders Drix to leave Frank’s body. Outside, Frank prepares to go to Buffalo, much to Shane's disapproval.

Unbeknownst to the duo, Thrax has survived the zit's destruction and launches a lone assault on the hypothalamus where he steals a crucial nucleotide. He then abducts Phlegmming's secretary, Leah Estrogen and flees to the mouth to escape. His actions disable the body's ability to regulate its internal temperature, and Frank develops a dangerous fever. As he is hospitalized, Ozzy convinces Drix not to leave and the duo catch up to Thrax and rescue Leah. Thrax induces Frank to sneeze him out of the mouth using pollen. Drix sends Ozzy after him and he and Thrax both land on Shane's cornea. As the duo battle, they end up on a false eyelash she is currently wearing. Ozzy tricks Thrax into getting his hand embedded in the lash and escapes just as it falls into a beaker of rubbing alcohol, killing Thrax.

As Frank's temperature surpasses 108 °F (42 °C), he goes into cardiac arrest. Ozzy rides on one of Shane’s tears back into Frank’s mouth with the stolen nucleotide, reviving him just in time. Ozzy is then welcomed back into the police force as he begins a relationship with Leah and Drix stays as Ozzy's new partner, whereas Frank commits himself to living a healthier lifestyle. Phlegmming, now removed from office and reduced to janitorial duty in the bowels, ejects himself from Frank’s body via flatulence after ignoring a notice not to trigger it.

== Cast ==
- Chris Rock as Osmosis "Ozzy" Jones, the main protagonist of the film, he's a quick-witted white blood cell with an impulsive personality.
- Laurence Fishburne as Thrax, the main antagonist of the film, he is a traveling deadly virus who intends to gain infamy by killing Frank within a record 48 hours of infection.
- David Hyde Pierce as Special Agent Drixenol "Drix" Drixobenzometaphedramine, a by-the-book cold pill who becomes Ozzy's best friend and partner.
- Brandy Norwood as Leah Estrogen, Mayor Phlegmming's secretary and Ozzy's love interest.
- Bill Murray as Francis "Frank" DeTorri, Shane's widowed father and Bob's brother, in whom the animated portions of the film take place.
- Elena Franklin as Shane DeTorri, Frank's ten-year-old daughter and Bob's niece, who is constantly irritated of his father's habits.
- William Shatner as Mayor Phlegmming, the secondary antagonist of the film, he is the arrogant, incompetent and corrupt mayor of the City of Frank.
- Chris Elliott as Bob DeTorri, Frank's brother and Shane's uncle.
- Molly Shannon as Mrs. Boyd, Shane's science and physical education teacher.
- Ron Howard as Tom Colonic, Phlegmming's rival in his incumbent mayoral election who promotes good health for Frank in his campaign.
- Joel Silver (uncredited) as the unnamed chief of the City of Frank's police department who is Ozzy's boss.
- Steve Susskind (uncredited) as Scabies, the leader of a gang of sweat germs who is murdered by Thrax.
- Danny Murphy as the zookeeper superintendent
- Jack McCullough as a zookeeper
- Jonathan Evans-Jones (uncredited) as a violinist cell who reprises his role from Titanic, whose part from said film is referenced.

Twisted Brown Trucker members Kid Rock, Kenny Olsen, Jason Krause, Joe C. (in his final posthumous performance), Stefanie Eulinberg, Jimmie "Bones" Trombly and Uncle Kracker provide the voices of the fictional band Kidney Rock.

== Production ==
Osmosis Jones went through development hell during production. The animated sequences, directed by Tom Sito and Piet Kroon, went into production as planned even being completed ahead of schedule, but acquiring both a director and a star actor for the live-action sequences took a considerable amount of time until Murray was cast as the main character of Frank and the Farrelly brothers stepped in to direct the live-action sequences. As part of their contract, the Farrelly brothers are credited as the primary directors of the film, although they did not supervise the animated portions of the film. Will Smith was reportedly interested in taking the part of Ozzy in early 1999, but in the end, his schedule would not permit it, as he was busy filming Wild Wild West (although he also turned down the role of Neo in another film that year, The Matrix, a decision Smith would later regret; the only reason Smith took the role of Jim West in Wild Wild West was because Mel Gibson left the project to work on 1994's Maverick). Osmosis Jones was originally rated PG-13 by the MPAA for "crude language" and "bodily humor" in 2000. However, Warner Bros. edited the film to make it family-friendly and the film was re-rated PG just for "bodily humor."

== Release ==
=== Marketing ===
The first trailer for Osmosis Jones was released in front of Pokémon 3: The Movie on April 6, 2001.

=== Home media ===
Osmosis Jones was released on VHS and DVD on November 13, 2001 by Warner Home Video.

== Reception ==
=== Box office ===
Osmosis Jones had its world premiere screening on August 7, 2001 at the Grauman's Egyptian Theatre before being widely released on August 10, 2001, in 2,305 theaters worldwide. Upon its original release, the film performed poorly and was the penultimate project produced by Warner Bros. Feature Animation (preceded by 1999's The Iron Giant and followed by 2003's Looney Tunes: Back in Action, both of which also failed at the box office upon their original releases). The film opened at #7 in its first opening weekend at the U.S. box office, accumulating $5,271,248 on its opening week and soon grossed $13,596,911. The film was a box office bomb, unable to recover its $70 million production budget.

=== Critical response ===
On Rotten Tomatoes, Osmosis Jones has an approval rating of 55% based on 112 reviews, with an average rating of 5.5/10. The site's critical consensus reads, "The animated portion of Osmosis is zippy and fun, but the live-action portion is lethargic." On Metacritic, the film has a weighted average score of 57 out of 100, based on 28 critics, indicating "mixed or average reviews". Audiences polled by CinemaScore gave the film an average grade of "B−" on an A+ to F scale. The film's animated sections were praised for their plot and fast pace, in contrast with the criticized live-action segments. Robert Koehler of Variety admired how the animated and live-action segments intermingled: "most extensive interplay of live-action and animation since Who Framed Roger Rabbit". Michael Atkinson of The Village Voice wrote its "genre satire" was "almost Swiftian": "disastrous physiopathological stats are fodder for glib newscasts." He thought the denouement surrendered "to the big sleep (in an amazing Ordet kind of way)", concluding "not since David Cronenberg’s Rabid has a movie used biological vulnerability to such resonant and anxious profit." NYT wrote "the film, with its effluvia-festival brand of humor, is often fun, and the rounded, blobby rendering of the characters is likable. But the picture tries too hard to be offensive to all ages. I suspect that even the littlest viewers will be too old for that spit." Roger Ebert gave the film 3 out of 4 stars and wrote: "Likely to entertain kids, who seem to like jokes about anatomical plumbing. For adults, there is the exuberance of the animation and the energy of the whole movie, which is just plain clever." The use of gross-out humor in the film's live-action sequences, as seen in most films directed by the Farrelly brothers, was widely criticized. As such, Lisa Alspector of the Chicago Reader described the film as a "cathartically disgusting adventure movie." Maitland McDonagh of TV Guide praised the film's animation and its glimpse of intelligence although did criticize the humor as being "so distasteful". Lisa Schwarzbaum of Entertainment Weekly felt that the film had a diverse premise as it "oscillates between streaky black comedy and sanitary instruction"; however the scatological themes were again pointed out. Jonathan Foreman of New York Post claimed Osmosis Jones to have generic plotting, saying that "It's no funnier than your average grade-school biology lesson and less pedagogically useful than your typical Farrelly brothers comedy." Michael Sragow of Baltimore Sun praised David Hyde Pierce's performance as Drix, claiming him to be "hilarious" and "a take-charge dose of medicine". The film also received criticism for its use of the Kid Rock song "Cool Daddy, Cool," the full version of which contains lyrics promoting statutory rape.

The film received numerous Annie Award nominations including Best Animated Feature (losing to Shrek).

== Soundtrack ==
A soundtrack containing hip hop and R&B music was released on August 7, 2001 by Atlantic Records. The soundtrack failed to chart on the Billboard 200, but Trick Daddy's single "Take It to da House" managed to chart to number 50 on the Billboard Hot 100 singles chart.

== Television series ==
Ozzy & Drix, an animated series that serves as a stand-alone continuation of the film starring Phil LaMarr and Jeff Bennett as the titular characters, aired on Kids' WB for two seasons and 26 episodes from September 14, 2002-July 5, 2004.

== See also ==
- Once Upon a Time... Life, an animated series with similar anthropomorphic representations of cells and germs.
- Cells at Work!, a Japanese manga/anime series with a similar premise.
- Inner Workings, a Disney short film set in the human body.
