= Miles Meadows =

Canadian actor

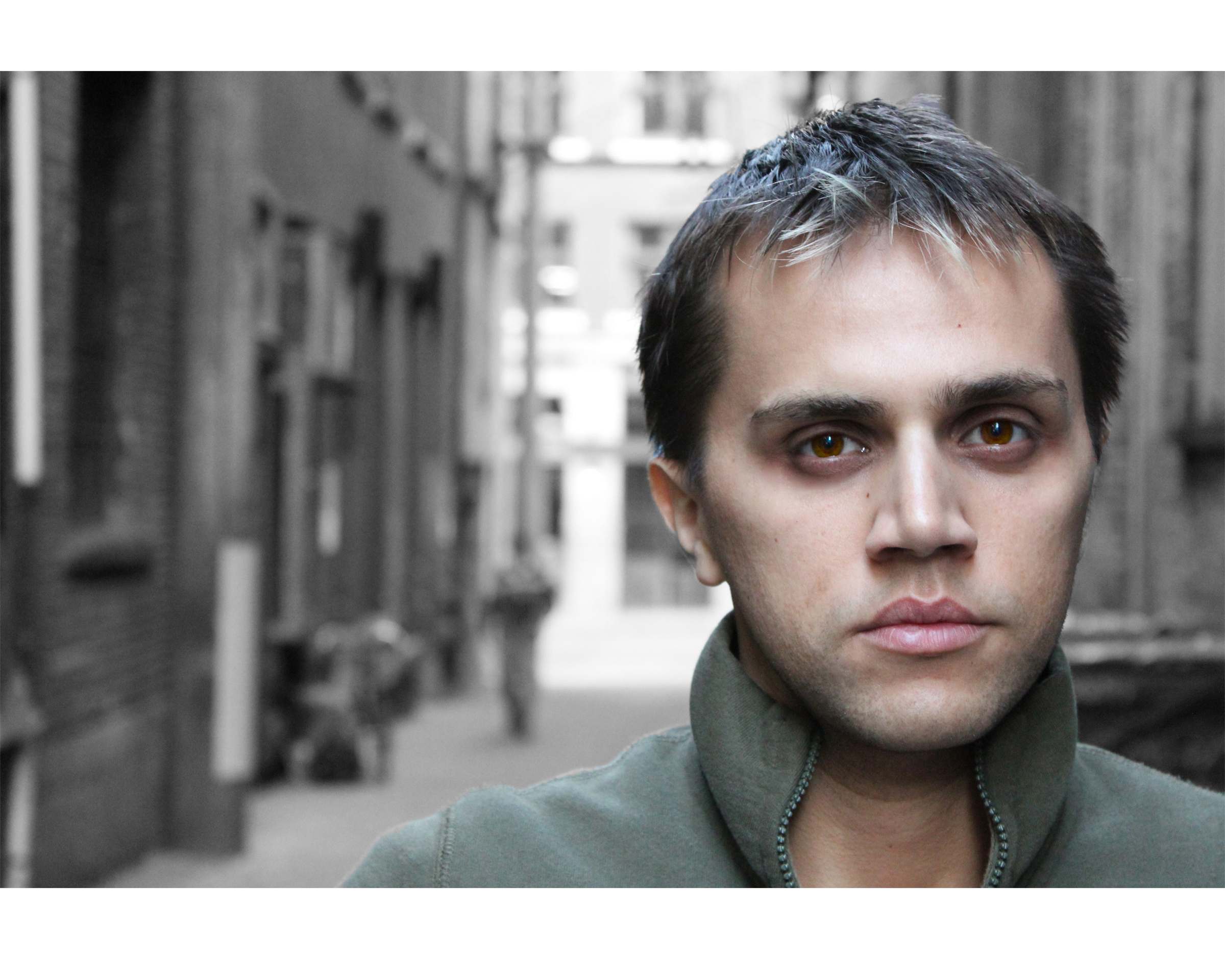
- Taken by photographer Caio Nery for the Brazilian publication 'Caras' on October 17th / 2010
- Born: Miles Harrison Meadows; Labrador City, Labrador, Newfoundland, Canada
- Occupations: Actor, Singer
- Years active: 2001–present

Miles Meadows (Born April 24) is a Canadian actor and singer. He has worked on films in Canada, the United States, and France, and has appeared in roles speaking French, (Le Petit Village), directed by Genieve Duliscouet, English, Italian and Latin, (The Strange Case Of DJ Cosmic).

== Early life ==
Meadows was born in Labrador City, Newfoundland and Labrador. He grew up in British Columbia, briefly lived in England as a child and in Los Angeles for three years. Though his home is in Vancouver British Columbia, as of 2014 Meadows resided in London, England.

== Career ==
Meadows became recognizable after roles on MTV's 2gether, multiple episodes of Showtime's The L Word and the highest-rated episode of TV series Jeremiah, "And the Ground, Sown with Salt". He performed in two Stephen King films, The Mangler 2 where "critics" compared him to a young Vince Neil and NBC's remake of Carrie where he received positive reviews.

Meadows stepped back from acting in 2007 to take care of his father, who had long been suffering from Parkinson's disease. In 2008, Meadows left performing entirely when his spouse was diagnosed with a rare form of cancer. He was with his father when he died August 9, 2009, and became a widower June 12, 2011. At the time Meadows was a medical first responder for the City Of Vancouver he carries a degree in forensics and a second in English. Following the death of his spouse Meadows, a dual Canadian and British citizen, relocated to London England where he earned his specialized licence as a train engineer for the London Underground and worked on the series Summer Lane Drive and lent his voice to various Sony Studios Games projects at Pinewood Studios. Meadows returned to Canada in 2020 to care for his Mother who fell ill during the pandemic until her death on March 8, 2023. Meadows has recently returned to commercial work and will appear in Hallmark's upcoming Valentines film An Unexpected Valentine

== Selected filmography ==
Year	Title	Role	Notes
2025	An Unexpected Valentine	New York Florist	(TV Movie)
2020	Summer Lane Drive	Delicious / Various	(TV Series Lead)
2009	The Strange Case of DJ Cosmic (short film)	DJ Junior/Johnny	(Film Lead)
2009	Fringe	Pony Tail Boy	(TV series)
2008	Le Petit Village	Felix	(Film Lead)
2007	World City Touring	Host	(Korean Travel Show)
2007	The L Word	Cooper	(Two Episodes)
2006	Noah's Arc	Autograph Seeker	(TV)
2006	Whistler (TV series)|Whistler	Druggie	(TV)
2006	Smallville	Doug	(TV)
2004	Going the Distance (2004 film)	PA	(Film)
2004	Romeo	Lance	(TV)
2003	Scary Movie 3	Frat Boy	(Film)
2002	Carrie (2002 film)	Kenny Garson	(NBC Telefilm) (Supporting Lead)
2002	Heart of America (film)	Kevin Rhodes	(Film Lead)
2002	Jeremiah	Prisoner	(Mini Series)
2002	Dark Angel	Rollins	(TV)
2002	Precisely Claire	Otis Buckshaw	(Film Lead) (Completed)
2002	Tribe of Joseph	Example	(Film Lead) (Completed)
2001	The Mangler 2	Example	(Film Lead) (Completed)
2000	2gether	Mr.Rochester	(Series)
2000	A Day in a Life	Skater	(Film)
1999	Eterne Sangui	Dancer	(Bravo Dance)
