= Totally Awesome =

- Film poster
- Written by: Neal Brennan; Michael Schur
- Directed by: Neal Brennan
- Starring: Mikey Day; Dominique Swain; James Hong; Chris Kattan
- Theme music composer: James Poyser
- Countries of origin: United States; Canada
- Original language: English

Production
- Producer: David Miner
- Cinematography: Todd Elyzen
- Editor: Edward Chin
- Running time: 99 minutes
- Production companies: 3 Arts Entertainment; VH1 Films; The Weinstein Company

Original release
- Network: VH1
- Release: November 4, 2006

Totally Awesome is a television film produced by VH1. Totally Awesome directly parodies a number of 1980s movies, including Dirty Dancing, Soul Man, Footloose, Some Kind of Wonderful, Sixteen Candles, Teen Wolf, Better Off Dead, Lucas, Pretty in Pink and The Karate Kid.

The film premiered on November 4, 2006, on VH1, and was broadcast to promote the film's DVD release on November 7.

== Plot ==
Ben Stein introduces the film as a long-lost film from the 1980s, so a lot of the jokes are now outdated in 2006.

As the Gunderson family sets out on a cross-country road trip to their new home, boyishly handsome Charlie, blossoming dancer Lori, and highly intelligent Max all have their own ideas of what life will be like in their new town. When Charlie is singled out as the least popular senior on the very first day of school, kindly outcast Billie amiably agrees to show him the ropes and provide him with an illuminating crash course in the clique system. Meanwhile, Lori is shocked to discover that dancing has been banned in her new town and the only place to cut loose is at the clandestine dance sessions held in the garage of current janitor and former dance instructor Gabriel. Immediately forbidden from attending the highly secretive shindigs, Lori stealthily sneaks out to be with the kindly Gabriel as her feelings for the dance instructor grow and the pair set into motion a clever plan to usher in a new era of dancing around town. When Charlie vows to win the heart of popular girl Kimberly by competing against her athletic boyfriend, Kipp, in the upcoming school decathlon, lovelorn Billie quietly pines for the clueless newcomer from afar as he begins a rigorous training regiment with Japanese gardener Yamagashi. As his family struggles to adjust to their new life, reclusive genius Max continues working on a highly advanced home computer that soon draws the attention of the CIA.

== Cast ==
- Mikey Day as Charlie Gunderson
- Dominique Swain as Lori Gunderson
- James Hong as Mr. Yamagashi
- Chris Kattan as Gabriel
- Trevor Heins as Max
- Nicki Clyne as Billie
- Brittany Daniel as Kimberly
- Joey Kern as Kipp Vanderhoff
- Teryl Rothery as Mrs. Gunderson
- Greg Kean as Mr. Gunderson
- Tracy Morgan as Darnell
- Tone Loc as himself
- Ben Stein as himself

== Reception ==
Heather Boerner of Common Sense Media gave it 3 out of 5 and called the "VH1 spoof awesome just for '80s teen film fans."

David Cornelius of DVD Talk wrote that the idea didn't work when it was called "Not Another Teen Movie" and again the filmmakers confuse "reference for punchline". He says the film "knows enough about its subject to come up with nifty joke ideas, but can't quite turn them into solid chuckle material" and concludes "This could have been a keen, fairly hilarious spoof, but instead it's a dry, overblown project that can't bother to follow through with its ideas."
