= Dominique Swain =

American actress and producer (born 1980)

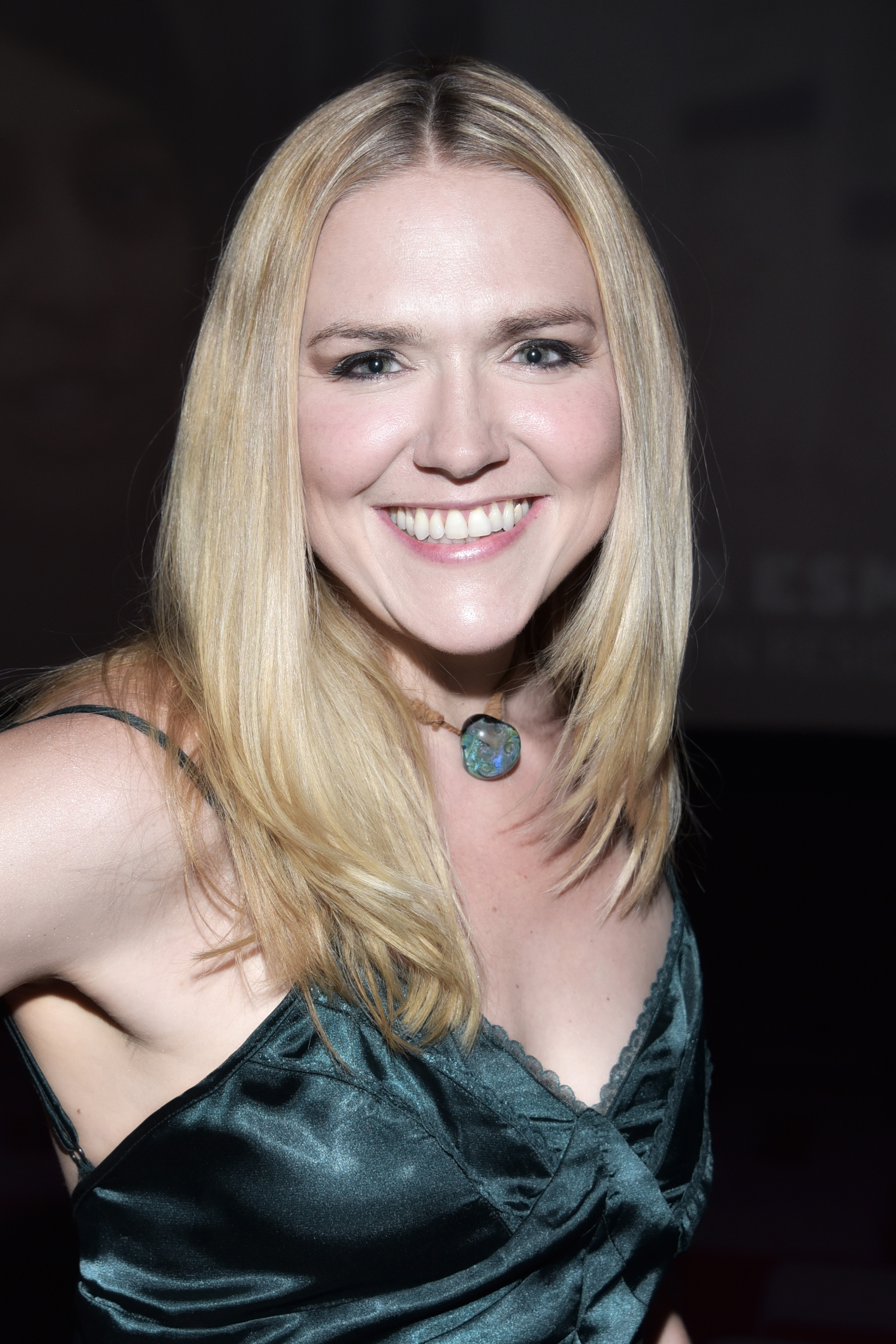
- Swain in 2017
- Born: August 12, 1980 (age 46); Los Angeles, California, U.S.
- Occupation: Actress
- Years active: 1993–present
- Relatives: Chelse Swain (sister)

Dominique Ariane Swain (born August 12, 1980) is an American actress. She first came to attention as the title character in Adrian Lyne's 1997 adaptation of Lolita, alongside a supporting role in John Woo's Face/Off also released in the same year. She worked predominantly in independent cinema throughout the late 1990s and early 2000s with credits including Girl (1998), The Intern (2000), Tart (2001), and Pumpkin (2002). Next she was in Alpha Dog (2006), Road to Nowhere (2010), and a succession of films in the action, thriller, and horror genres.

== Early life ==
Swain was born in Los Angeles, California, (Note: Some sources indicate Swain was born in Malibu, where she was raised; however, in a 2002 interview, she stated she was born in Los Angeles and delivered by her father in the family's car on the side of the Santa Monica Freeway: "Swain was born in August 1980 near the Fairfax Avenue exit on the Santa Monica Freeway. “My dad delivered me,” she shares. “The headline in the newspaper was: ‘Dad David Delivers Daughter Dominique In Datsun.’ For years, I was contemplating whether they named me Dominique just for the alliteration.”) to David and Cindy (née Fitzgerald) Swain. Her father was an electrical engineer. She is the second of three daughters; her sister, Chelse, is also an actress.

Swain was raised in Malibu and attended Malibu High School, where she was her class valedictorian.

== Career ==
=== 1997–1999: Film debut and critical acclaim ===
In 1995, at the age of 15, Swain was chosen from 2,500 girls to play the title role of Dolores "Lolita" Haze in Adrian Lyne's controversial screen adaptation of the 1955 novel, Lolita. Released in 1997, the film earned positive reviews from critics with New York Magazine calling it "superior" to the Stanley Kubrick version from 1962, and Caryn James of The New York Times writing that Swain's performance was "extraordinary," adding:

She is within sight of womanhood yet remains, definitely, a schoolgirl... Ms. Swain walks this incredibly narrow line between innocent playfulness and adult knowledge without a misstep.

Also in 1997, Swain appeared as John Travolta's rebellious teenage daughter, Jamie, in John Woo's commercially successful action thriller Face/Off, with a positive review from Entertainment Weekly highlighting her chemistry with Travolta. Next, she headlined the 1998 drama Girl, in which she portrayed a high-schooler determined to lose her virginity. Writing for Variety, critic David Stratton called it a "well-cast, modestly effective pic" with "a bright, intelligent performance" by Swain.

Speaking of finding it hard to secure roles in the wake of Lolita, a matter she attributed to typecasting, Swain later commented, "I turned down stuff specifically because of nudity, because it doesn't take a whole lot of class to yank your clothes off... I had a body double in Lolita [so] I think the goal was 'Let's see what she really looks like.' They were sending me scripts with no substance to them."

=== 2000–2006: Independent films ===
Swain had prominent roles in various independent films throughout the early 2000s—The Smokers, The Intern, Pumpkin, and New Best Friend—and worked on three occasions with Brad Renfro—Happy Campers, Tart, The Job—prior to his death. In 2006, she starred as aspiring dancer Lori Gunderson in Totally Awesome, a parody of 1980s teen movies. She played the supporting role of Susan Hartunian in Alpha Dog, the closing night film at 2006's Sundance Film Festival. A crime drama based on the murder of Nicholas Markowitz, Swain's character was inspired by Natasha Adams-Young, a key figure in the real case who was granted legal immunity in exchange for her testimony in court.

=== 2007–present: Genre films and television work ===
In 2007, Swain headlined the supernatural horror film Dead Mary, which Fangoria felt was successful in setting itself apart from other entries in the genre. Her performance in the 2010 thriller Road to Nowhere was lauded, which Kevin Thomas described as a "stylish, shimmering neo-noir" in his review for the Los Angeles Times.

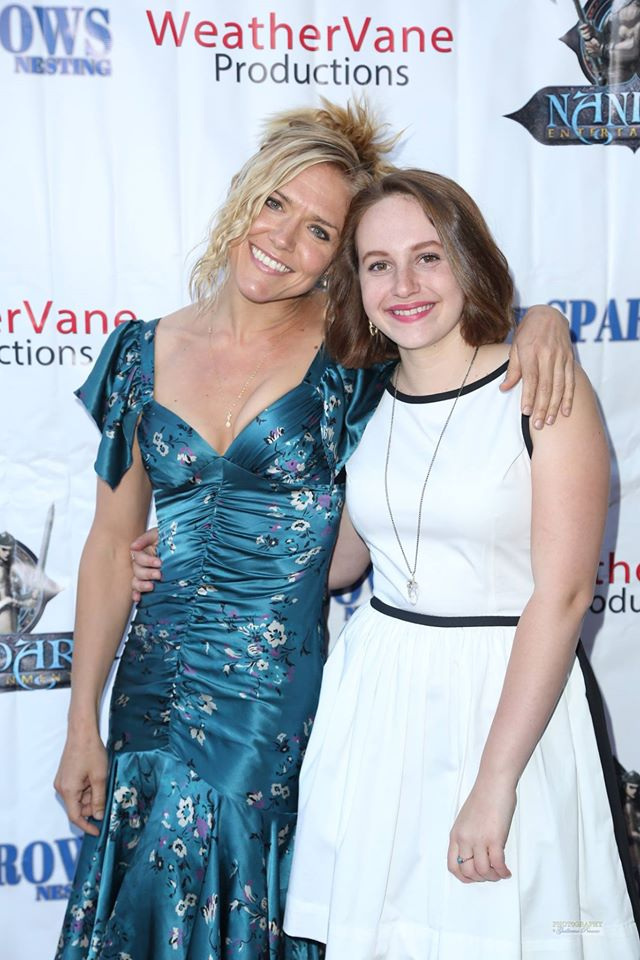
Swain (left) and Mandalynn Carlson at a screening of The Sparrows: Nesting at Raleigh Studios in Hollywood, California, April 20, 2015

After lead roles in the straight-to-video action films The Girl from the Naked Eye, Nazis at the Center of the Earth, Skin Traffik, and Sharkansas Women's Prison Massacre, Swain starred in the 2016 thriller The Wrong Roommate; her first of several appearances in The Wrong... series, an anthological group of Lifetime television films.

== Campaign ==
In 2001, at the age of 21, Swain posed nude for PETA's "I'd Rather Go Naked than Wear Fur" campaign.

== Filmography ==
=== Film ===
Film work by Dominique Swain
Year	Title	Role	Notes
1997	Face/Off	Jamie Archer	
1997	Lolita	Dolores "Lolita" Haze	
1998	Girl	Andrea Marr	
2000	Intern	Jocelyn Bennett	
2000	The Smokers	Jefferson Roth	
2001	Happy Campers	Wendy	
2001	Tart	Cat Storm	
2001	Mean People Suck	Kate	Short
2002	Pumpkin	Jeanine Kryszinsky	
2002	Dead in the Water	Gloria	
2002	New Best Friend	Sidney Barrett	
2002	Briar Patch	Inez Macbeth	
2003	As Virgins Fall	Ellen Denver	
2003	The Job	Emily Robin	
2004	The Freediver	Maggie	
2004	The Madam's Family: The Truth About the Canal Street Brothel	Monica	TV movie
2004	Out of Season	Kelly Phillips	
2005	Devour	Dakota	Video
2005	Journeyman	Dominique	
2005	The Locrian Mode	Jill	Short
2006	Alpha Dog	Susan Hartunian	
2006	All In	Ace	
2006	Totally Awesome	Lori	TV movie
2007	The Pacific and Eddy	Chelsea	
2007	White Air	Christie	
2007	Dead Mary	Kim	Video
2007	Fall Down Dead	Christie Wallace	
2008	Prairie Fever	Abigail	Video
2008	Stiletto	Nancy	
2008	Noble Things	Amber Wades	
2008	Toxic	Nadia	
2008	A Cat's Tale	Mom (voice)	Video
2008	Capers	Mercy	
2008	Borders	Ashley	Short
2009	Nightfall	Quinn	
2009	Stuntmen	Mindy Danger	
2010	Road to Nowhere	Nathalie Post	
2010	Trance	Laura	
2012	The Girl from the Naked Eye	Alissa	
2012	Nazis at the Center of the Earth	Dr. Paige Morgan	Video
2012	Private War	LCpl. Roberts	Video
2013	Blue Dream	Gena	
2014	The Knockout Game	Citizen	Short
2014	Fatal Instinct	Aly	
2014	The Lost Girls	Lucy	
2014	Boudoir	Colette	Short
2015	Sharkansas Women's Prison Massacre	Honey	TV movie
2015	The Mourning	The Suited Woman	
2015	No Deposit	Girl in Bar	
2015	Fatal Flip	Alex Saunders	TV movie
2015	Skin Traffik	Anna Peel	
2015	6 Ways to Die	Steph Garcia	
2015	Rock Story	Sammy Carlson	
2015	Embers	Woman in the Long Dress	
2015	A Horse Trail	Sydney	
2016	The Wrong Roommate	Janice Dahl	TV movie
2016	Widows	Amanda Brandt	Short
2016	The Demon in the Dark	Giganta	Short
2016	Fishes 'n Loaves: Heaven Sent	Reva Hutchins	
2016	The 6th Friend	Heather	
2016	A Doggone Christmas	Dr. Langley	
2016	A Husband for Christmas	Amanda Hess	TV movie
2017	The Matadors	Madonna	
2017	You Can't Have It	Tammy	
2017	The Fast and the Fierce	Juliette	
2017	Boone: The Bounty Hunter	Olivia	
2017	Hate Horses	Wendy Lou Perrin	
2017	You Have a Nice Flight	Ashley	
2017	The Black Room	Stacy	
2017	Photographic Memory	Elisa McAdams	Short
2017	Hexing	Alice	
2017	Spreading Darkness	Fiona Funari	
2018	Battle Drone	Alexandra Hayes	
2018	A Doggone Adventure	Amy Hill	
2018	Astro	Julie Adams	
2018	Minutes to Midnight	Chloe	
2018	The Wrong Cruise	Monica	TV movie
2018	For Jennifer	Randi	
2018	Nazi Overlord	Dr. Eris	
2018	The Wrong Teacher	Beth	TV movie
2019	1st Born	Ingrid	
2019	Rottentail	Anna Banana	
2019	Blood Craft	Hilde	
2019	The Last Big Save	Joan	
2019	2177: The San Francisco Love Hacker Crimes	Guadalupe Santana	
2019	The Wrong Mommy	Kellyanne	TV movie
2019	Eminence Hill	Gretchen	
2020	Chronicle of a Serial Killer	Kelly Smith	
2020	Girl Lost: A Hollywood Story	Beth	
2020	Meteor Moon	General Hauser	
2021	Obsessed with the Babysitter	Silvia Cartwright	TV movie
2021	The Wrong Mr. Right	Scarlett Shaw	TV movie
2022	4 Horsemen: Apocalypse	General Bridget Norris	
2022	Shadow Master	Dewitt's Mother	
2023	State of Desolation	Tina	AKA End Times
2023	Secrets at the Museum	Danielle	TV movie

=== Television ===
Television work by Dominique Swain
Year	Title	Role	Notes
2005	JAG	Lt. Eve Sorrens	Episode: "The Sixth Juror"
2006	Ghost Whisperer	Stacy Chase	Episode: "Friendly Neighborhood Ghost"
2014	Celebrity Ghost Stories	Herself	Episode: "Julie White/Roger Bart/Dominique Swain/Thomas Ian Nicholas"

=== Music videos ===
Music video work by Dominique Swain
Year	Title	Artist
1998	"Lullaby"	Shawn Mullins
2002	"We Are All Made of Stars"	Moby
2004	"Rapid Hope Loss"	Dashboard Confessional
2007	"Rockstar"	Nickelback

== Accolades ==
Award/association	Year	Category	Nominated work	Result	Ref.
Chicago Film Critics Association	1999	Most Promising Actress	Lolita	Nominated	
Downbeach Film Festival	2013	Lifesaver Achievement Award		Won	
DVD Exclusive Awards	2003	Best Actress	Tart	Nominated	
Hoboken International Film Festival	2019	Best Supporting Actress	The Last Big Save	Nominated	
MTV Movie Awards	1999	Best Kiss (with Jeremy Irons)	Lolita	Nominated	
San Diego International Film Festival	2007	Rising Star	The Pacific and Eddy	Won	
Saturn Awards	1998	Best Performance by a Younger Actress	Face/Off	Nominated	
Silver Lake Film Festival	2007	Best Actress	The Pacific and Eddy	Won	
Young Artist Awards	1999	Best Performance – Leading Young Actress	Lolita	Won	
YoungStar Awards	1999	Best Performance by a Young Actress in a Mini-Series/Made for TV Film	Lolita	Nominated	
