= Marc Hyman =

American screenwriter

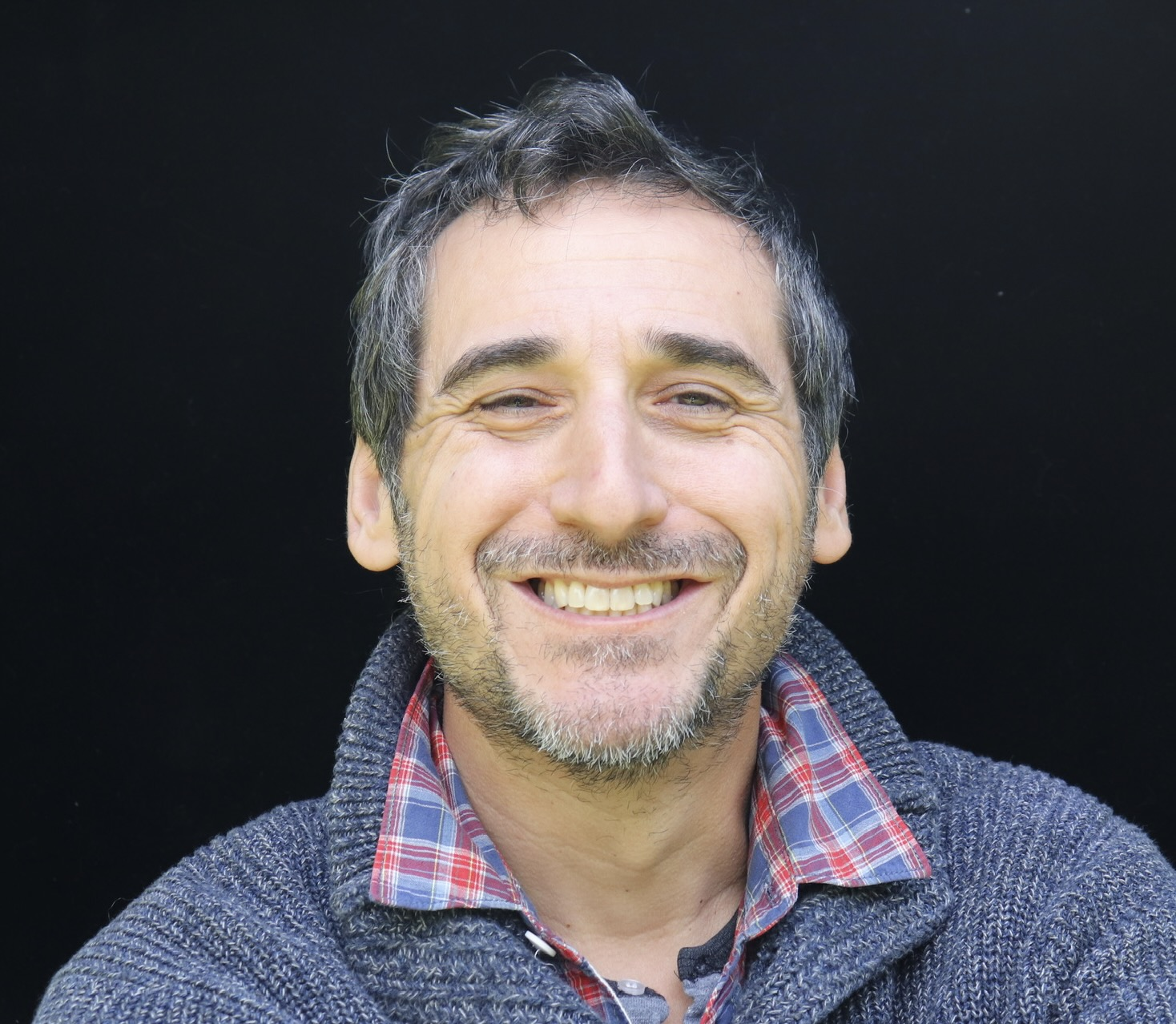
Hyman in 2020

Marc Hyman is an American screenwriter. His writing credits include Universal's Meet the Fockers, Paramount's The Perfect Score, Warner Bros.'s Osmosis Jones, Amazon MGM's 2025 remake of War of the Worlds and Open Road Films' Show Dogs. He has served as a script doctor for over 40 produced films.

== Career ==
Hyman began his career writing for television series, All That, Sweet Valley High and the short-lived Fox sitcom, Lush Life. He then moved to feature writing with Warner Bros. live-action/animated Osmosis Jones Hyman later developed the film's spin-off Ozzy & Drix.

Hyman worked with Jay Roach to develop Meet the Fockers, which was, in 2005, the highest-grossing comedy of all time.

In addition to his credited work, Hyman has rewritten scripts for films, including DreamWorks Animation's How to Train Your Dragon, Madagascar 3: Europe's Most Wanted, Penguins of Madagascar, and cult hits like Freddy Got Fingered and Disney's Bubble Boy. Throughout his career, Hyman has contributed comedy to dozens of movies including, Dodgeball: A True Underdog Story, Freaky Friday, Monsters vs. Aliens and Shrek. He has collaborated on original scripts with actors such as Keanu Reeves, Mike Myers, Ice Cube and others. In television, Hyman has written pilots for ABC, Fox, CBS and FX, including vehicles for Kelsey Grammer, Matthew McConaughey (both for the FX Network), and with Julia Roberts for ABC.

== Rewrites and polishes ==
From: IMDb Script and Continuity Department

- Rock Star (Warner Bros.)
- Me, Myself & Irene (Fox)
- The Smurfs (Sony)
- Charlotte's Web (Paramount)
- The Ringer (Fox)
- Showtime (Warner Bros.)
- Say It Isn't So (Fox)
- Rush Hour (New Line)
- Shanghai Noon (Touchstone)
- Wild Wild West (Warner Bros.)
- Shrek (DreamWorks)
- First Daughter (Fox)
- Glory Road (Disney)
- How to Train Your Dragon (DreamWorks)
- Madagascar 3: Europe's Most Wanted (DreamWorks)
- Penguins of Madagascar (DreamWorks)
- Monsters vs. Aliens (DreamWorks)
- The Ant Bully (Warner Bros.)
- Movie 43 (Relativity)
- Agent Cody Banks 2: Destination London (MGM)
- Kangaroo Jack (Warner Bros.)
- Freddy Got Fingered (Fox)
- Bubble Boy (Touchstone)
- DodgeBall: A True Underdog Story (Fox)
- Last Holliday (Paramount)
- Joe Somebody (New Regency)
- Dr. Dolittle 2 (Fox)
- Just My Luck (Fox)
- Freaky Friday (Disney)
- Ghosts of Girlfriends Past (New Line)
- The Secret Life of Walter Mitty (Fox)
- Ghostbusters (Sony)
- Yours, Mine & Ours (Paramount, MGM, & Sony)
- Transformers (Paramount)
- The Great Wall (Legendary)
- War of the Worlds (Universal)
