= The Smokers (film) =

- DVD cover
- Directed by: Christina Peters
- Written by: Christina Peters; Kenny Golde
- Story by: Christina Peters
- Produced by: Kenny Golde; Nicholas M. Loeb
- Starring: Dominique Swain; Busy Philipps; Keri Lynn Pratt; Nicholas M. Loeb; Oliver Hudson; Ryan Browning; Joel West; Thora Birch
- Cinematography: J.B. Letchinger
- Edited by: Elias Chalhub
- Music by: Geoff Levin
- Production company: International Production Company
- Distributed by: MGM Home Entertainment
- Release dates: March 5, 2000 (SBIFF); February 5, 2002 (United States)
- Running time: 96 minutes
- Country: United States
- Language: English

The Smokers is a 2000 American black comedy film directed and written by Christina Peters. It was released on DVD on February 5, 2002.

== Plot ==
Three rebellious teenage girls decide to even the score in the battle of the sexes. Looking back a few years after the events depicted, Jefferson Roth (who, along with her sisters are named after former presidents) tells the story of the last few months of her senior year at a Wisconsin boarding school when she and two girl friends, the naive Lisa and the outrageous Karen, conspire to use a pistol to turn the tables on males after a wealthy older man, with whom Karen had a one-night stand, refuses to give her his home phone number. They stage a sexual assault on David, Lisa's on-and-off boyfriend, in an effort to try to be more like their male counterparts. However, it backfires, as all three girls learn they are not able to have sex the way they feel a man can. Their unfaithfulness to their own objective is summed up in Karen's words, just prior to her tragic ending, "I wish I had a boyfriend."

== Cast ==
- Dominique Swain as Jefferson Roth
- Busy Philipps as Karen Carter
- Keri Lynn Pratt as Lisa Stockwell
- Nicholas M. Loeb as Jeremy
- Oliver Hudson as David
- Ryan Browning as Dan
- Joel West as Christopher
- Thora Birch as Lincoln Roth
- Tell Draper as Todd Manning
- Ryan Sasson as Ryan
- Jenne Zblewski as Charlotte

== Reception ==
According to aggregate review site Rotten Tomatoes, it has an audience review rating of 42%.
