= List of Thank God You're Here episodes =

The following is a list of episodes for the Australian version of the improvisational television comedy series Thank God You're Here.

== Series One (5 April 2006 – 7 June 2006) ==
=== Series One Guest stars ===
Guests include various Australian personalities, usually with a comedy/acting background.

Guest star	Known for	Appearances	Wins	Honourable Mentions	Dishonourable Mentions
Hamish Blake	Comedian, actor, Fox FM radio DJ	2	1	1	–
Fifi Box	Triple M radio host. Runner Up in the sixth season of the Australian Dancing With The Stars	5	1	–	1
Alan Brough	Actor/comedian, from Spicks and Specks and Kath & Kim	1	1	–	–
Tanya Bulmer	Actor/comedian	1	–	–	1
Robyn Butler	Radio host, actor	1	–	–	1
Santo Cilauro	Writer, comedian, performer	1	–	–	–
Bob Franklin	Actor/comedian	2	1	–	–
Kate Langbroek	Nova 100 radio host	1	–	–	–
Josh Lawson	Actor	3	–	3	–
Shaun Micallef	Comedian, actor, Vega 91.5 radio host	3	–	3	–
Matthew Newton	Actor, son of Bert Newton	1	–	–	1
Glenn Robbins	Actor/comedian	1	–	1	–
Peter Rowsthorn	Actor/comedian	4	2	1	–
Akmal Saleh	Comedian	3	1	–	2
Angus Sampson	Actor	6	2	–	–
Frank Woodley	Comedian, from Lano & Woodley	4	1	–	1
Julia Zemiro	Comedian, host of RocKwiz	2	1	–	1

=== Series One Episode overview ===
Denotes the Winner, or Joint Winner

==== Episode 1: 5 April 2006 ====
Guest star	Scenario	Placement and why
Fifi Box	With a tracksuit, was placed into an infomercial for a fitness product, a la Good Morning Australia	
Frank Woodley	With Roman warrior outfit, was sent back into Roman times, to meet his family and deliver war news to the Emperor.	Winner for sheer courage, determination and a very sneaky exit.
Angus Sampson	In full doctor outfit, was placed into the operating room, played a surgeon operating on a woman with some form of ear illness.	
Peter Rowsthorn	Placed in a Council Meeting selling the idea of a new, highly eco-unfriendly land development in Byron Bay.	
During the week	Shopping Centre Slicer Sales, Equestrian Commentary Booth, Cops Interview, Real Estate Agent	
Group scene	Featured contestants as members of a children's group, called The Wibbly Wobblies, a la The Wiggles, pitching their proposed TV show at an audition.	

==== Episode 2: 12 April 2006 ====
Guest star	Scenario	Placement and why
Matthew Newton	As a sales representative for a new alcoholic beverage called "Fresh".	Dishonourable mention for attempting to hit on one of his customers at the car yard. (During the week)
Shaun Micallef	Hosting a children's TV show, a la Play School.	Honourable mention for working with kids and stuffed animals at the same time.
Fifi Box	In a Pride and Prejudice scenario, meeting a suitor (guest star Dan O'Connor from Neighbours).	Winner as an apology for putting her in a cupboard, a car yard and a corset.
Angus Sampson	On a late night TV show (a la the Late Show with David Letterman) as a famous TV chef guest (with guest star Natalie Bassingthwaighte from Neighbours).	
During the week	Customs Officer Interview, Wine Tasting, Fashion Show Commentary Booth, Car Yard.	
Group scene	Set in a World War II POW camp, with the characters planning an escape, a la The Great Escape.	

==== Episode 3: 19 April 2006 ====
Guest star	Scenario	Placement and why
Fifi Box	Presenting a new corporate image for the Socceroos.	
Glenn Robbins	Arriving home from a cycling trip to find his wife leery of suspicious messages on the answering machine.	Honourable mention for his work with 'Kids Without Playgrounds In Their Backyards'.
Frank Woodley	As an Asian martial arts master just returned from a 10-year sojourn meditating silently in a cave.	Dishonourable mention for making the joke "Hung Sing, son of Hung Well".
Akmal Saleh	As a doctor presenting a range of pharmaceutical products on a morning talk show.	Winner for an excellent performance on debut.
During the week	Interview with Boss, Cinema Slides, Hi-Fi Sales.	
Group scene	Set in a Viking den, with each actor to demonstrate their prowess in various Viking arts.	

==== Episode 4: 26 April 2006 ====
Guest star	Scenario	Placement and why
Santo Cilauro	As a plumber paying a house visit to a lonely housewife.	
Peter Rowsthorn	As the captain of a starship (a la Star Trek).	Honourable mention for landing a spaceship single-handedly.
Robyn Butler	As an actress promoting her recent movie.	Dishonourable mention for sending back a 3-armed adopted baby.
Angus Sampson	Sacking a longtime employee of a hardware firm.	Winner for facing the surreal experience of sacking the woman he once loved, and then informing her that he was homosexual.
During the week	Cheese Waiter, Jockey Interview, Canine Trials Commentary Booth, Boat Sales.	
Group scene	Set in a church office, with all guests as Catholic priests working on ideas to increase church-going, particularly amongst children.	

==== Episode 5: 3 May 2006 ====
Guest star	Scenario	Placement and why
Akmal Saleh	As a group instructor for teaching clients customer service skills.	Dishonourable mention for stating as a petshop owner that guinea pigs could be bounced off a wall. (During the week)
Alan Brough	As a senator on the television show "Meet the Leaders", explaining his unique political standpoints, a la Meet the Press.	Winner for sending 11-year-olds into battle.^
Shaun Micallef	As a Tudor physician sent to treat the king's ailing foot.	Honourable mention for upon losing his 'pantaloons' offered the line, 'Excuse my unworthy crack'.
Julia Zemiro	As a pyjama-clad daughter attempting to cover up the party she held during her parents' absence.	Winner for trashing her parents' house and still managing to blame her sister.^
During the week	Insurance Claim, Street Reporter, Pet Shop.	
Group scene	Set in a health clinic, the members of the group each played an overweight person who had to explain why they had put on weight since their last visit.	

^ This is the first time there has ever been a tie between two winners in one night.

==== Episode 6: 10 May 2006 ====
Guest star	Scenario	Placement and why
Peter Rowsthorn	As the captain of an ailing cruise ship explaining plentiful complaints by the passengers.	Winner for being faced with a sinking ship and offering passengers free quoits.
Josh Lawson	As a man (who turns out to be married near end of scene) meeting his Internet girlfriend for the first time.	Honourable mention for speaking French with a Scottish accent.
Angus Sampson	As a man hoping to rejoin Robin Hood's Band of Merry Men.	
Julia Zemiro	As the author of self-help books, being interviewed on a radio program.	Dishonourable mention for being clearly distracted in the men's shower room (All-in).
During the week	Tarot Cards, Council Extensions, Rodeo Commentary Booth, Piano Sales.	
Group scene	As members of a TV sports panel, crossing live to Julia in the locker room at half time.	

==== Episode 7: 17 May 2006 ====
Guest star	Scenario	Placement and why
Josh Lawson	As an expert "Dog Whisperer", demonstrating ideal dog-handling techniques to a roomful of dog owners.	Honourable mention for getting licked by a dog who had, beforehand, licked its private parts.
Fifi Box	As the Minister for Planning in a local Council, discussing her "needle" exchange program, which has been built directly across the road from a primary school.	
Bob Franklin	As the leader of a revolutionary army, describing to his followers the plans for the following day's battle.	Winner for surviving a parrot attack and leading a revolution based on the philosophy, 'All Men Are Expecting Too Much'.
Frank Woodley	As the owner of a retirement estate, being interviewed on television about his unusual practices and approach to aged care.	
During the week	Job Interview, Reporter: Canberra, Gallery Curator, Tour Bus Guide.	
Group scene	As members of an Amish community, being called to the Elders to explain their sins.	

==== Episode 8: 24 May 2006 ====
Guest star	Scenario	Placement and why
Angus Sampson	As Ozzie Phil, the co-manager of an Australian Pie Company.	
Josh Lawson	As a cowboy, returning from an Indian-related mission.	Honourable mention for playing a fondue-cooking cowboy.
Tanya Bulmer	As a bride, struggling to get to the end of the speeches with her husband at the wedding reception.	Dishonourable mention for turning on her sister and breaking her vows of 'nunhoodedness'.
Hamish Blake	As "Sledge", an Australian music icon who has sold 1 billion copies of his album, being interviewed on The Late Show. He is joined by Kate Ceberano for a duet.	Winner for actually grabbing Kate Ceberano on the bottom
During the week	Stadium Announcements, School Tour.	
Group scene	As superheroes (Stacey, the 'Just Super' girl; Reptilo, who can regrow limbs; Archimedo, who knows about the displacement of water, and has a laser; and Donald, who can fix things) fighting to save the world from an asteroid sent by Darryl Eastlake Man.^	

^Note: All the heroes' names and powers, plus the villain's name were coined by the contestants. (They were asked who they were and who the villain was)

==== Episode 9: 31 May 2006 ====
Guest star	Scenario	Placement and why
Hamish Blake	As an office worker accused of racist and sexist comments.	Honourable mention for getting sacked and still managing to hit on his boss's secretary.
Bob Franklin	As a war hero coming home to his family and friends for the first time in years.	
Fifi Box	As "Tanya Mills", a spokeswoman for the company "Naughty but Nice" which sells items and clothing to spice up fun in the bedroom.	Dishonourable mention for telling us that, as a little girl, she dreamed of making adult products.
Peter Rowsthorn	As "Jeff", an Australian cricketer giving a press conference to face questions about some of his more disgraceful behaviour.	Winner for being abusive, drunk and seen cavorting with naked nurses, but still managing to score a double-century.
During the week	Childcare Centre, Reporter: Beach, Housing Estate Sales.	
Group scene	As pirates applying to be first mate on a new pirate ship.	

==== Episode 10: 7 June 2006 ====
Guest star	Scenario	Placement and why
Shaun Micallef	As a foreign affairs minister explaining his country's actions to another country, namely an ecological disaster and insulting their queen. (Your queen was so fat that she auditioned for The Biggest Loser, and was told "Sorry, no professionals").	Honourable mention for being the first Australian minister to apologise for anything.
Angus Sampson	As Roger Higginbottom, a passenger on the Titanic, showing his friends his skills with women.	Winner for his advice on picking up a woman, 'Listen, look, touch'.
Frank Woodley	As a man returning home after a day on the goldfields, and finds his mother sick.	
Kate Langbroek	As Cleopatra, returning from a trip to the Nile.	
Akmal Saleh	As a clown attempting to respond to several complaints regarding his (dangerous and unidealistic) act.	Dishonourable mention for juggling kittens, and shrinking a horse.
During the week	Big Brother.	
Group scene	A breakfast television show "Daybreak" a la "Sunrise", with each character playing a different role (anchor, news reporter, sports reporter, weatherman, traffic update, appearing respectively). Featured use of all three indoor sets and a helicopter. ^	

^While Kate Langbroek and Akmal Saleh when through the door, Shaun Micallef and Angus Sampson went to two green rooms on both sides of the set, Frank Woodley headed into a helicopter outside the studio which then took him up above the studio to do his segment.

== Series Two (6 September 2006 – 8 November 2006) ==
=== Series Two Guest stars ===
Guest star	Known for	Appearances	Wins	Honourable Mentions	Dishonourable Mentions
Stephen K Amos	Comedian	1	–	1	–
Arj Barker	Comedian	1	–	–	1
Tahir Bilgiç	Actor/comedian	2	–	1	1
Hamish Blake	Comedian, actor, radio host	3	–	–	3
Fifi Box	Triple M radio host	1	–	–	1
Alan Brough	Actor, comedian, from Spicks and Specks	1	–	1	–
Robyn Butler	Radio host, actor	1	–	–	1
Anh Do	Comedian, actor, writer	1	1	–	–
Bianca Dye	Radio host	1	–	1	–
Dailan Evans	Writer, actor, from The Wedge	1	–	–	–
Anthony Field	The Blue Wiggle	1	1	–	–
Bob Franklin	Actor/comedian	1	1	–	–
Andrew G	Radio presenter, co-host Australian Idol	1	–	–	1
Russell Gilbert	Comedian	1	–	–	1
Kate Jenkinson	Actor, from The Wedge	1	–	1	–
Jimeoin	Actor/comedian	1	1	–	–
Josh Lawson	Actor	2	1	–	1
Tony Martin	Comedian, writer, radio host	3	1	2	–
Shaun Micallef	Comedian, actor, radio host	2	1	1	–
Matthew Newton	Actor	2	1	–	1
Glenn Robbins	Actor/comedian	1	–	–	1
Peter Rowsthorn	Actor/comedian	1	–	–	1
Akmal Saleh	Comedian	1	–	–	1
Angus Sampson	Actor	1	–	–	1
Ryan Shelton	Actor, comedian, from Real Stories	1	–	–	1
Jo Stanley	Television and radio personality	2	–	1	1
Merrick Watts	Comedian, radio host	1	1	–	–
Cal Wilson	Comedian, radio host	2	1	1	–
Frank Woodley	Comedian, from Lano and Woodley	1	–	–	1
Julia Zemiro	Comedian, RocKwiz Hostess	2	–	1	1

=== Series Two Episode overview ===
Denotes the Winner, or Joint Winner

==== Episode 1: 6 September 2006 ====
Guest star	Scenario	Placement and why
Hamish Blake	As a 1950s boy picking up a girl for a first date, who is confronted by her father, a Senator (presumably a United States one).	Dishonourable mention for calling his date a special little pink pig.
Anh Do	As a chef in a restaurant that serves poor quality food and drink who is confronted by angry diners (one of which being a 'professional' food critic).	Winner for his timely health warning, "Don't go to the toilet when it's cold - it damages your bits."
Cal Wilson	As a game show co-hostess. TV Jackpot (a la Temptation)	Honourable mention for introducing nudity to a TV game show.
Tony Martin	Hip music/entertainment talk show guest.	Honourable mention for his Lady Jennifer of Hawkins quest (All-in).
During the week	Auction, Dentist.	
Group scene	Medieval knights reporting to King Arthur to discuss their separate adventures, and to learn their next adventure.	

==== Episode 2: 13 September 2006 ====
Guest star	Scenario	Placement and why
Shaun Micallef	As the leader of an expedition climbing Mount Everest, planning their way up the summit.	Winner for giving scouts tattoos (All-in)
Dailan Evans	As a film reviewer for the fictional program Screen who recently attended the Australian Foreign Film Festival.	
Bianca Dye	A travel agent employee who helps a couple decide on a cruise, while an angry customer calls up to complain about his service.	Honourable mention for turning I.T.A. into I Trust Arse
Josh Lawson	As a philanthropist who returns from a journey in the Amazon.	Dishonourable mention for comparing the queen to a dog.
During the week	Nursing Home, Drive Thru.	
Group scene	Scouts meeting to discuss how to generate more interest in the organisation.	

==== Episode 3: 20 September 2006 ====
Guest star	Scenario	Placement and why
Julia Zemiro	As a school captain brought before the principal for not respecting school values.	Honourable mention for helping Year 9 girls with muffin tops.
Matthew Newton	As a driver who crashed his car into an apartment.^	Winner for turning a learner's plate into a legend's plate.
Russell Gilbert	As 'Lieutenant Starbuck', the star of a cancelled sci-fi show at a convention.	Dishonourable mention for demonstrating a self-toileting suit on national TV.
Ryan Shelton	As a dancer on a reality TV dance contest show.	Dishonourable mention for stabbing his dance partner with an umbrella.
During the week	Mechanic, Totally Wild: Flight Simulator.	
Group scene	As a group of guest stars and presenters on a charity 'telethon': 'The Grow Well Telethon'.+	

^ Contrary to popular belief, this was not the first time a member of the ensemble cast did not say "Thank God you're here" at the start of the scene. Lines similar (but not identical) to the title of the show have been used in scenes before, such as "Thank the Lord you're here" and "Thank the gods you're here". However, this was the first time the guest entered the scene without using one of the trademark blue wooden doors. Instead, Matthew Newton was escorted around the back of the set by host Shane Bourne, and he entered through a curtain (which, when viewed from the front, made him look like he was emerging from the car which was half-embedded in the wall of the set). The first words spoken were, "Thank God you're alive!"

+ For this final scene, Ryan Shelton was placed elsewhere (presumably out the back or to the side in the studio) with four kids who looked around 4–5 years old.

==== Episode 4: 27 September 2006 ====
Guest star	Scenario	Placement and why
Bob Franklin	As a husband at a marriage counselling centre.	Winner for playing a husband with a terrific love life that his wife wasn't involved in.
Angus Sampson	As 'Davo', a radio personality & co-host for the 'Breakfast Bunch 97.6'	Dishonourable mention for holding a competition featuring the prize of a schooner of ouzo.
Fifi Box	As a party performer dressed in a fairy costume at a child's birthday party.	Dishonourable mention for eating her own performing duck.
Tahir Bilgiç	As a headmaster of a private school addressing an audience at Parent Information night.	Honourable mention for his school philosophy - "Today's students, tomorrow's gangs".
During the week	Centrelink Interview, Siege.	
Group scene	The manager at a fast-food outlet 'Big Big Burgers' asks questions to the four staff members about the way they act toward customers.	

==== Episode 5: 4 October 2006 ====
Guest star	Scenario	Placement and why
Akmal Saleh	A television psychic who can see on the 'other side'.	Dishonourable mention for playing an over-excited psychic out to raise money for his home extension.
Hamish Blake	A pharmaceutical doctor who has to explain the new range of products for his pharmacy, Pharmo-Klein.	Dishonourable mention for his line - "No more gas, it's a flact."
Anthony Field	A karate sensei teaching karate.	Winner for devising a martial art called I-can't-do and for throwing in a Wiggles move.
Kate Jenkinson	The seductive governess of a Baron's children.	Honourable mention for going from a convent to a kebab shop to a transgender governess all in a corset.
During the week	Diving Commentator, Lighthouse Tour Guide.	
Group scene	A sports show, where Blake and Field are commentators, and Jenkinson and Saleh as reporters.	

==== Episode 6: 11 October 2006 ====
Guest star	Scenario	Placement and why
Josh Lawson	Fire Brigade officer being questioned about the bush fires. ^	Winner for localising a bushfire to the bush and for saving a house with staples.
Alan Brough	Army Sergeant in the trenches.	Honourable mention for introducing summer frocks into the trenches.
Andrew G	Sports coach listening to complaints from parents of children in his team.	Dishonourable mention for taking 11-year-olds on the Kokoda track.
Jo Stanley	A mother in her bedroom with husband and children.	Dishonourable mention for insisting that her son scores on schoolies week.
During the week	Taxi Inspector Interview, Totally Wild: Zoo Vet.	
Group Scene	The four stars are nuns being addressed by mother superior.	

^ The first time that a Guest Performer says the line "Thank God You're Here". Josh Lawson knocked on the door as he was about to walk through and then when entering he quipped "Thank god you're here, I was knocking for hours."

==== Episode 7: 18 October 2006 ====
Guest star	Scenario	Placement and why
Tahir Bilgiç	An irresponsible husband, arriving home late and dealing with his wife.	Dishonourable mention for telling his wife that while walking down the aisle all he could think was "Why me?"
Tony Martin	A city's superhero, Flashman, called by city officials to review his position.†	Honourable mention for raising punctuality to the level of a superpower.
Cal Wilson	As Miss Caicos, a Miss Universe 2007 contestant.	Winner for playing a beauty queen whose goals included learning to spell 'science' and getting rid of Miss China.
Arj Barker	As an irresponsible housemate, explaining his actions to his peeved housemates.	Dishonourable mention for being a Pakistani Swedish American whose sole contribution to household cleaning was emptying the trash on his computer.
During the week	Celebrity Chef, 'Picnic At Hanging Rock 2', featuring Australian personalities Jane Hall and Andy Lee.	
Group Scene	Former cast-members of 'A Town In The Valley', a la Family Ties being interviewed on a 'Where Are They Now'-type show.	

^ Featured Australian personalities Alan Fletcher (Neighbours' Dr Karl), Kimberley Davies and Matt Welsh on the Miss Universe judging panel. This episode was also advertised as an 'international episode' that would feature a Turk, a yank, and two kiwis.

† Tony Martin went through the regular door but, had to be let in through a window by the ensemble cast members in the scene.

==== Episode 8: 25 October 2006 ====
Guest star	Scenario	Placement and why
Peter Rowsthorn	A senator on a political talk-back show a la Meet the Press.	Dishonourable mention for trying to solve global warming with air-conditioners.
Jimeoin	An Egyptologist discovering an ancient burial chamber.^	Winner for suffering a curse that dooms you to not being able to think of a curse.
Robyn Butler	A 38-year-old daughter being confronted by her parents because she is still living at home.	Dishonourable mention for refusing to marry a crown prince because he lacked 20/20 vision.
Stephen K. Amos	An animator pitching a new children's movie 'Snake and friends'.	Honourable mention for managing to argue that a snake snuff movie was actually about childhood obesity.
During the week	Stock Market Report, A Current Affair Report.	
Group Scene	A group of Greenpeace-type activists, getting chided at for their poor rallying efforts.	

^ Jimeoin had to go around the side and crawl through to the scene.

==== Episode 9: 1 November 2006 ====
Guest star	Scenario	Placement and why
Glenn Robbins	A department store Santa Claus having to respond to a disgruntled manager, due to several crying children.	Dishonourable mention for playing a cigar smoking Santa who arrived without pants on, on the back of a push bike... but only once a year.
Matthew Newton	An aeroplane pilot who has crashed in a tropical setting, being questioned by the passengers. ^	Dishonourable mention for playing a drunk pilot whose only advice to passengers was 'hang onto each other's hair'.
Jo Stanley	A singer having an interview with Rolling Stone Magazine.†	Honourable mention for playing a train spotting pop star who couldn't sing.
Merrick Watts	A teacher holding parent-teacher interviews with two parents, concerned about his teaching.	Winner for getting his students to cook, clean, iron and wash his car.
During the week	Lotto, Burke's Backyard.	
Group Scene	Coverage of Election 2006, with Glenn Robbins and Merrick Watts playing expert panellists, and Jo Stanley and Matthew Newton were crossed to as the Labor and Liberal candidates.	

^ Once again, Matthew Newton was led around to the back of the centre set, and started the scene coming down the emergency slide to appear like coming from the plane wreckage.

† Featured special appearance by Australian Idol judge Mark Holden.

==== Episode 10: 8 November 2006 ====
Guest star	Scenario	Placement and why
Shaun Micallef	As a bushwalker stranded and being rescued by a search party member.	Honourable mention for surviving on leaves and compost inside the stomach of an accommodating bear.
Julia Zemiro	As 'Annie Blake', the subject of a 'That Was Your Life' show, a la This Is Your Life. ^	Dishonourable mention for accusing Greg Evans of groping her.
Tony Martin	The chief of a police terrorism force who forcibly enter a suspect's house and interrogate the suspects.†	Winner for spearheading the war on terrorism while dealing with explosions, dogs and out of place brass bands.
Hamish Blake	As a grandfather visiting his family on his 85th birthday.	Dishonourable mention for playing a man who stole his friend's war medals and tried to hit on his own daughter.
Frank Woodley	As a captain of a ship a la Master and Commander.~	Dishonourable mention for playing a naval captain who abandoned his ship by running into the audience.
During the week	Contestants participating in a Challenge and Tribal Council on Celebrity Island (parody of Survivor.)	
Group Scene	As a network team covering a major horse racing event, presumably the 2006 Melbourne Cup.	

^ Instead of opening the door, Julia went behind the set and was asked to wait for the doors to be slide open to look alike a "This Is Your Life" entrance. Featured special appearances by Play School presenter Simon Burke as the host and former Perfect Match host Greg Evans.

† Instead of opening the door, an ensemble cast member dressed as a SWAT officer smashes the door for Tony.

~ Instead of opening the door, Frank climbed through a tunnel leading to the doors under the helm of the ship.

== Series Three (11 July 2007 – 26 September 2007) ==
=== Series Three guest stars ===
Guest star	Known for	Appearances	Wins	Honourable Mentions	Dishonourable Mentions
Arj Barker	Comedian	1	1	–	–
Carl Barron	Comedian	1	–	1	–
Hamish Blake	Comedian, actor, radio host	3	1	1	1
Fifi Box	Radio host	1	–	1	–
Sean Choolburra	Comedian	1	–	1	–
Stephen Curry	Actor/comedian	2	–	1	1
Anh Do	Comedian	2	–	1	1
Bob Franklin	Actor/comedian	1	1	–	–
Peter Helliar	Comedian	2	–	2	–
Dave Hughes	Comedian, radio host	2	1	–	1
Eddie Ifft	Comedian	1	–	–	1
Kate Jenkinson	Actor, from The Wedge	1	–	–	1
Kate Langbroek	Comedian, actor, radio host	1	1	–	–
Josh Lawson	Actor	2	1	–	1
Tony Martin	Comedian, actor, radio host	2	–	–	2
Shaun Micallef	Comedian, radio host	2	1	1	–
Julia Morris	Comedian	1	–	1	–
Ross Noble	Comedian	1	1	–	–
Peter Rowsthorn	Comedian	1	–	1	–
Akmal Saleh	Comedian	1	–	1	–
Angus Sampson	Actor	1	–	1	–
Nish Selvadurai	Comedian	2	–	–	1
Ryan Shelton	Comedian, from Real Stories	1	–	1	–
Matt Tilley	Comedian, radio host	1	–	–	1
Merrick Watts	Comedian, radio host	3	1	–	1
Cal Wilson	Comedian, radio host	3	1	1	1
Rebel Wilson	Comedian, radio host	2	1	1	–
Frank Woodley	Comedian	1	–	1	–
Julia Zemiro	Comedian, television host	2	1	–	–

=== Series Three Episode overview ===
Denotes the Winner, or Joint Winner

==== Episode 1: 11 July 2007 ====
Guest star	Scenario	Placement and why
Peter Helliar	Steve, a co-host for a 70s music show titled The Go Show (a la Countdown).	Honourable mention for introducing the word 'yo' into the English language 20 years before it was actually used.
Stephen Curry	A fashion designer being interviewed on daytime talk show The Helen Darby Show (a la The Ellen DeGeneres Show).	Honourable mention for his anti-fake-fur stance.
Cal Wilson	A nanny who is being questioned by the parents of the children she is looking after.	Dishonourable mention for teaching kids to vote on Australian Idol on a stolen mobile phone.
Josh Lawson	An alien who landed in the Gold Coast hinterlands for various reasons. ^	Winner for crossing the galaxy in a spaceship powered entirely by a Nokia charger.
During the week	Parkside Waters, Theatre Auditions	
Group Scene	As astronauts who have just landed back on Earth (except for one) who attend a NASA Press Conference to discuss their mission.	

^ Instead of opening the door, Lawson was led to the back of the set to climb through a gap in the wall which led to the door of a spaceship.

==== Episode 2: 18 July 2007 ====
Guest star	Scenario	Placement and why
Merrick Watts	A high-roller poker player who confronts his aggressive fellow players.	Honourable mention for getting rid of his Aston Martin with cream.
Kate Langbroek	A flirty cheerleader auditioning to be a part of a football team's cheerleading squad.	Winner because they made her wear Lycra.
Nish Selvadurai	An ignorant inventor on the show The Inventors (a la The New Inventors), presenting his "Funtabulator" which seems to do nothing.	Honourable mention for the profound and simple maxim "Every good invention has a dial"
Hamish Blake	A school student confronted by his parents after a driving violation.	Honourable mention for thanking his mother for breast milk.
During the week	Lift, Japanese TV: Wildlife Officer.	
Group Scene	Four women (one an ensemble) involved in heated discussions on the daytime women's talk show The Couch (a la the ill-fated The Catch Up), with special guest 'Dr. Paul' (Nish) talking about his job as a plastic surgeon.^	

^ Hamish Blake and Merrick Watts were in drag for this scene.

==== Episode 3: 25 July 2007 ====
Guest star	Scenario	Placement and why
Tony Martin	A director showcasing his latest play, Don, to a group of investors.¹	Dishonourable mention for casting Karl Stefanovic as Sir Donald Bradman.
Eddie Ifft	A country/western singing sensation is interviewed on a talk-show called "The Tonight Show."²	Dishonourable mention for leaving a horse on the 14th floor of a hotel.
Julia Morris	A shopaholic questioned by her angry husband about her "efforts" to save money.	Honourable mention for playing a shopaholic so troubled she needs 12 bags to put her lipsticks in.
Shaun Micallef	A 1920s British gent meets his friends at a picnic and is surprised by his new fiancé.³	Winner despite the fact that he ate his way through the entire props budget.
During the week	Canine Pro, Sports Star Retires.	
Group Scene	A group of performers (Ifft as a clown, Micallef as a magician, Morris as a burlesque act and Martin as a ventriloquist) on a cruise ship are questioned about their recent poor performances.	

¹ This scene also featured Nikki Webster as one of the characters.

² Instead of going through the door, Eddie was led backstage by a cast member dressed as a stagehand and entered through an entryway, to make it look like he was appearing onto the set.

³ Before entering, Shaun tried pulling host Shane Bourne into the scene rather forcibly. Shane would bring this up again in Episode 11, when Shaun made his next appearance.

==== Episode 4: 1 August 2007 ====
Guest star	Scenario	Placement and why
Akmal Saleh	As a profiler working for the police department after several murders.	Honourable mention for the Il Carbonara weather effect (Group Scene).
Dave Hughes	As an obnoxious Olympic athlete who visits a school as a guest speaker.	Winner for an excellent first-time performance in a highly flammable tracksuit.
Rebel Wilson	As a deceitful woman visiting her husband in jail.	Honourable mention for attempting a handstand on national TV (Group Scene).
Josh Lawson	As a businessman launching his new budget airline Jetplus (a la Jetstar).	Dishonourable mention for yet again fondling an ensemble cast member (Group Scene).
During the week	Family Plus, Boss Addresses Workers	
Group Scene	A group of citizens on a television program called Globe Aid (a la Cool Aid) – Saleh as a macroclimatologist, Wilson as a media personality, Hughes as a farmer and Lawson as the patriarch of a highly sustainable family.	

==== Episode 5: 8 August 2007 ====
Guest star	Scenario	Placement and why
Frank Woodley	As a Boarding Kennel owner, explaining to a couple why he has lost their cat.	Honourable mention for attempting to juggle a cat.
Ross Noble	As an Elf King who has returned from an adventure (a la The Lord of the Rings).	Winner for being sent back to Middle Earth and still managing to get a Who Wants To Be A Millionaire? reference in.
Matt Tilley	As a cosmetic surgeon advertising his new treatment, Moxybrasion.	Dishonourable mention for turning Pauline Hanson into a man.
Julia Zemiro	As a lovelorn doctor having an affair with her boyfriend's colleague.	Dishonourable mention for failing to use the word 'stat'.
During the week	MegaSlim, Cafe 16	
Group Scene	As a bobsledding team of athletes returning from a test run with bad results.^	

^ Instead of entering through the door, the performers entered through the back on a bobsleigh which glided into the set.

==== Episode 6: 15 August 2007 ====
Guest star	Scenario	Placement and why
Merrick Watts	As an Ambassador of Australia meeting the leader of an Asian country.	Winner for hugging a foreign minister and giving him a pair of "ugh gloves".
Fifi Box	As a magazine editor who is being confronted by her superiors over the magazine's direction.	Honourable mention for exposing Princess Mary's secret fear of trees.
Bob Franklin	As a WWII English Air force officer briefing his pilots of a proposed attack in Germany.	Winner for somehow ending a military briefing by using the word 'baboons'.
Nish Selvadurai	As an actor accepting an AFI award.^	Dishonourable mention for accepting an AFI award and a ribbon he thought was a bra.
During the week	Regal Towers, Japanese TV: Harbour Chopper Tours.	
Group Scene	As workers on the backyard renovation show Better Backyards (a la Backyard Blitz) – Watts as the handyman, Box as the horticulturist, Franklin as the recycling specialist and Nish as the electrician.	

^ Instead of walking through the door, Nish had to sit down at a table by the stage with his ensemble partner, to appear as though they were at the awards show.

==== Episode 7: 22 August 2007 ====
Guest star	Scenario	Placement and why
Tony Martin	As a scout leader questioned over his dubious scouting activities.	Dishonourable mention for introducing a badge for up-skirting into the scouts ("that would be worn next to the tea-bagging badge").
Cal Wilson	As a commentator for a Royal Wedding.	Winner for taking us to a Royal Wedding that involved a runway wig, an exploding corgi and reading from Harry Potter 7.
Carl Barron	An explorer lost in the Australian outback (modelled on the Burke and Wills journey). ^	Honourable mention for leading an expedition during which men were encouraged to sing, dance and grab each other.
Stephen Curry	The CEO of a large corporation holding their AGM.	Dishonourable mention for starting a company dedicated to the eradication of fat kids from Australia.
During the week	Metro Insurance, Totally Wild: Horse Trainer.	
Group Scene	Employees of an unsuccessful ghost train at a carnival – Martin as a skeleton, Wilson as a witch, Curry as a bear and Barron as a vampire.	

^ Instead of walking through the door, Barron had to walk through the back to appear as if he had come through the bush.

Note: Due to the Australian Idol 2007 semi-finals, no new episode was screened on 29 August 2007 in the next scheduled week.

==== Episode 8: 5 September 2007 ====
Guest star	Scenario	Placement and why
Dave Hughes	As a holiday resort manager with unhappy "honeymooners".	Dishonourable mention for telling a honeymooning couple to go and put sand down their undies.
Kate Jenkinson	As a daughter, confronted by her parents about her spending too much time with boys. ^	Dishonourable mention for convincing her parents that 'D' in a French assignment stands for 'Dis-en-cong-vleu-bleu-mont'.
Anh Do	As the designer of a new car, the "El Pronto".	Honourable mention for designing an Asian people-mover powered by fast-food.
Hamish Blake	As a professor on K'Pow, a children's science TV show.	Winner for coming up with Newton's third law of attraction 'B = D + D'.
During the week	Western TAFE, Weekenders Winery.	
Group Scene	As guests on a news and current affairs show talking about the "success" of the war on terror – Hughes as a weaponry specialist, Blake as an author and social commentator, Jenkinson as a reporter and Do as a radio host.	

^ Kate entered via the back of the set to look as though she had come up some stairs within her house. This scene also featured Mick Molloy as a performer.

==== Episode 9: 12 September 2007 ====
Guest star	Scenario	Placement and why
Peter Helliar	A customer service officer for a car rental company.	Honourable mention for maintaining a character and a head tilt throughout the scene.
Rebel Wilson	A tourist in an Italian Cafe having lunch with two attractive Italian men.	Winner for portraying a backpacker whose main idea of culture was the gelati store.
Ryan Shelton	As a film director on a movie review show discussing his Saw-style horror films.	Honourable mention for dealing with a picky film critic by chucking popcorn at him.
Peter Rowsthorn	As a Flash Gordon-inspired hero held captive by a super-villain.^	Honourable mention for brilliant use of stomach muscles.
During the week	Motor Central, Skysat News.	
Group Scene	Subjects in a medieval King's court – Helliar as a peasant, Wilson as a fair maiden, Shelton as a court jester and Rowsthorn as a knight.	

^ Instead of walking through the door, Peter was restrained and was wheeled in the scene by a cast member dressed as a henchman.

==== Episode 10: 19 September 2007 ====
Guest star	Scenario	Placement and why
Cal Wilson	A guest staying at a Health Retreat being questioned by the staff.	Honourable mention for coining the phrase 'Let the bok choy run free'.
Arj Barker	A contestant in the 'hotseat' on a game show titled Making Millions (a la Who Wants to Be a Millionaire?).	Winner for 'gesticulating' an elephant and playing for US$800 000.
Sean Choolburra	As a manager of a children's play centre. ^	Honourable mention for starting a scene by landing on a button and then agreeing not to sue.
Merrick Watts	As a hoon on trial in court for being caught in possession of a large amount of stolen goods.	Dishonourable mention for lying to a court about 11 TVs, 2 girlfriends and a relationship with our PM.
During the week	Vita Boost, School Assembly.	
Group Scene	Reporters covering the first day of the 2007 ASEAP Games.³	

^ Instead of walking through the door, Sean entered via a children's tube slide which he slid down on into the set. Tom Gleisner said he would give Sean bonus points if he exited the scene the same way he entered - back up the tube. Shane Bourne told Sean to go ahead, but Sean said "after you", resulting in Shane climbing up the tube as well. This is one of the very rare times Shane gets involved with the set.

³ Featured Matt Welsh as a guest performer.

==== Episode 11: 26 September 2007 ====
Guest star	Scenario	Placement and why
Anh Do	As Andrew, the latest evictee from the Big Brother House being interviewed.^	Dishonourable mention for playing a firefighter raising money for little kiddies by robbing other little kiddies (Group Scene).
Hamish Blake	As a newly-wed spending time with his wife on their honeymoon at a caravan park.	Dishonourable mention for vowing to try to be faithful and for spending his honeymoon in the same caravan as his parents, separated only by a flexible floral sheet.
Angus Sampson	As 'Bob', a presenter on a Hi-5-type children's show.	Honourable mention for not only putting up with a vinyl jacket, but also for managing to rhyme diseases with nieces.
Julia Zemiro	A widowed cattle station owner being wooed by a gentleman suitor.	Winner for doing her own bird sound effects.
Shaun Micallef	As the Scarlet Pimpernel, in a meeting with his English colleagues.	Honourable mention for introducing iTunes to the 18th century.
During the week	SCU – Serious Crimes Unit.	
Group Scene	Presenters on a Christmas carols special: Carols in the Park (a la Carols in the Domain)³ – Blake and Zemiro as the co-hosts of the presentation, Sampson as a drunk Santa Claus, Do as a questionable fireman and Micallef as an even more questionable doctor.	

^ - Anh emerged from behind the studio audience and walked on stage via a catwalk, similar to the evicted housemates on the Big Brother Australia Eviction Shows.

³ - Featured The Veronicas as guest performers

== Series Four (29 April 2009 – 8 July 2009) ==
=== Series Four Guest stars ===
Guest star	Known for	Appearances	Wins	Honourable Mentions	Dishonourable Mentions
Franklyn Ajaye	Comedian, actor	1	–	1	–
Arj Barker	Comedian	1	–	1	–
Carl Barron	Comedian	1	1	–	–
Hamish Blake	Comedian, actor, Fox FM radio host	2	1	1	–
Alan Brough	Actor, comedian, from Spicks and Specks	1	–	1	–
Rob Carlton	Comedian, actor Chandon Pictures & The Hollowmen	1	–	1	–
Rhys Darby	Actor	1	–	1	–
Anh Do	Comedian, actor, writer	1	–	1	–
Bob Franklin	Actor	1	–	–	1
Heath Franklin	Comedian	1	–	–	1
Tom Gleeson	Radio host	1	–	–	1
Adam Hills	Comedian, television presenter	1	–	1	–
Dave Hughes	Comedian, Nova 100 radio host	1	–	1	–
Colin Lane	Comedian	2	1	–	1
Kate Langbroek	Comedian, actor, radio host	1	–	1	–
Josh Lawson	Actor, comedian, TGYH veteran	2	1	1	–
Josie Long	UK Comedian, actor Skins	2	1	1	–
Tony Martin	Comedian	1	–	–	1
Jordan Raskopoulos	Comedian, actor	1	1	–	–
Peter Rowsthorn	Actor, comedian	1	–	–	1
Angus Sampson	Actor, comedian	3	1	2	–
Akmal Saleh	Comedian	1	–	–	1
Toby Truslove	Actor	2	–	1	1
Felicity Ward	Comedian, radio presenter	2	–	2^	–
Merrick Watts	Comedian	3	2	1	–
Cal Wilson	Comedian, radio host	2	1	–	1
Rebel Wilson	Comedian, actor	2	–	2	–
Julia Zemiro	Comedian	2	1	1	–

^ An "Extra-Honourable" mention (Episode 7).

=== Series Four Episode overview ===
Denotes the Winner, or Joint Winner

==== Episode 1: 29 April 2009 ====
Guest star	Scenario	Placement and why
Merrick Watts	As the site supervisor of a building under construction, convincing WorkSafe inspectors why his site should not be shut down.	Honourable mention for justifying that a worker is wearing crocs on the grounds that a beach may fall on him.
Colin Lane	As an employee of a wildlife sanctuary visiting a school classroom, teaching students about Australian animals, along with a co-worker for support.	Winner because he was in drag (All-in).
Cal Wilson	As the great-granddaughter of Percy Little, presenting a eulogy at Percy's funeral, along with her brother.	Dishonourable mention for leaving her great-grandfather in a shed for 12 years.
Rhys Darby	As Captain Midnight, trying to hold up a travelling party, with horse in tow, in "early day" times.^	Honourable mention for his highwayman pickup line, 'Wow, look at you'.
During the week	Motorstop, Cable TV Channels	
Group scene	As pregnant women (Cal, Colin), a partner (Rhys) and an obstetrician (Merrick) participating in a birthing class.	

^ Instead of walking through the door, Rhys had to walk through the back to appear as if he had come out of the misty darkness.

==== Episode 2: 6 May 2009 ====
Guest star	Scenario	Placement and why
Hamish Blake	As a knight which has returned from a five-year quest, only to confront his king and wife.^	Honourable mention for naming his horse 'Boris' and for putting up with a haircut for no apparent reason.
Josie Long	As a pop star attending a high-profile event, being interviewed by reporters on the red carpet.†	Winner despite her belief that knives never hurt anyone.
Peter Rowsthorn	As a staff member of a camping store, helping explorers purchase new products.~§	Dishonourable mention for putting 20 sherpas in an 8-man tent.
Rob Carlton	As a doctor, informing the worried grandchildren of the status of their dying grandmother.#	Honourable mention for trying to revive a patient by raising her legs 3 feet and turning on a fan.
During the week	Nullgesic, Aussie Fishing Adventures	
Group scene	As reporters (Rob, Hamish), a working class father (Peter) and an international reporter (Josie) appearing on the political analysis television show Question Time.≈	

^ Instead of walking through the door, Hamish came through the back, a castle hallway adjacent to a dungeon, while riding his horse.
† Instead of walking through the door, Josie came through the back, as to appear as if she had hopped out of the door of a limousine.
~ Featured Damien Fleming as a guest performer.
§ After walking through the door, Peter followed a hidden corridor to the back of set to appear as if emerging from inside a tent.
# After walking through the door, Rob had to walk down a hidden corridor which then lead to hospital style double-hinged doors which he walked through.
≈ Josie's segment was done in front of a green-screen. Peter's segment was done from the front yard of a real house opposite the Melbourne Showgrounds entrance gate.
Rob's scenario was actually filmed 2nd, and Josie's was filmed 4th. The segment order was switched in the broadcast show.

==== Episode 3: 13 May 2009 ====
Guest star	Scenario	Placement and why
Angus Sampson	As a hotel concierge who is trying to explain his hotel's poor service to a couple of long-serving customers.^	Honourable mention for blaming a sinking penthouse on rising damp.
Dave Hughes	As a ventriloquist being interviewed on Late Night Live with his puppet, Eddy.†	Honourable mention for playing two characters: a blue emu and a slightly bluer children's entertainer.
Jordan Raskopoulos	As a Roman soldier known for his wise advice who decided to defeat Julius Caesar.	Winner for plotting to kill Caesar with a wedgie.
Rebel Wilson	As the fiancé of the Swedish prince who is trying to impress his parents, the King and Queen.	Honourable mention for counting from 1 to 5 in Swedish and for doing the worm.
During the week	MaxiChat, Movie Interview	
Group scene	As the cast of an extreme motocross arena show trying to explain their poor performance to the promoter.~	

^ Instead of walking through the door, Angus followed a hidden corridor to the back of the set to appear as if emerging from an elevator.
† Featured Melissa Tkautz as a guest performer.
~ Instead of walking through the door, Dave entered later in the scene from the back of the set, riding a miniature motocross bike.

==== Episode 4: 20 May 2009 ====
Guest star	Scenario	Placement and why
Julia Zemiro	As a 50's tomboy at a train station catching up with her friends (a thinly veiled spoof of The Famous Five) after her trip.^	Honourable mention for portraying a child adventurer too fond of jubes and swimming naked.
Carl Barron	As a Formula One race car driver getting criticised about his recent performances both on and off the track.†	Winner despite putting himself in danger of drinking his own body-weight in champagne (All-in).
Bob Franklin	As Colin, a board member of the State and National Bank, discussing the termination of an employee's position at the bank.	Dishonourable mention for threatening to have a tea-lady put down for drinking too much water.
Tom Gleeson	As the Prime Minister of Australia, arriving at an unnamed Pacific Island nation to give a special announcement.	Dishonourable mention for telling a President that he valued their country's easy women.
During the week	Love List Phone	
Group scene	As members of the bridal party in a wedding, all expected to make speeches – Zemiro as the bride, Barron as the groom, Franklin as the best man and Gleeson as the maid of honour.	

^ Instead of walking through the door, Julia followed a hidden corridor to the back of the set to appear as if she was disembarking from a train.
† Instead of walking through the door, Carl got behind the wheel of a mock Formula One racing car, which was then guided onto the set.
~ Instead of walking through the door, Tom followed a hidden corridor to the back of the set to appear as if he was disembarking from an Air Force cargo aircraft.

==== Episode 5: 27 May 2009 ====
Guest star	Scenario	Placement and why
Tony Martin	As the owner of a mining company visiting his employees down in the mine.^	Dishonourable mention for threatening mine-workers with a visit from Human Nature.
Cal Wilson	As a clairvoyant whose clients were a family that had lost their father and husband.	Winner for throwing in an accent and for putting up with a scarf.
Franklyn Ajaye	As a recently un-retired professional boxer, promoting an upcoming title bout.	Honourable mention for playing a boxer helping troubled youth to be more troubled.
Merrick Watts	As a budget airline captain, explaining a travel delay to his passengers.	Honourable mention for blaming a plane delay on hitting a taxi on the runway.
During the week	Kevington Grammar	
Group scene	As employees of a nightclub, trying to explain their incompetence to the owner - Martin as the bouncer, Wilson as the doorgirl, Ajaye as the DJ and Watts as the bartender.	

^ Instead of walking through the door, Tony followed a hidden corridor to the back of the set to appear as if climbing down a ladder from the ground level to the mine.

==== Episode 6: 10 June 2009 ====
Guest star	Scenario	Placement and why
Kate Langbroek	As a late-night talk show guest talking about her recent marriage to an elderly rich man.	Honourable mention for playing a Brisbane party girl with lovely merignes who brought a pensioner to his knees.
Angus Sampson	As a big game hunter and owner of a private island, who in "evil genius" fashion had been planning to organize a hunt where the targets were passengers from a boat his henchmen had capsized.	Winner for playing a psychopathic, hay fever–affected hunter facing up to the fact that his island doesn't have EFTPOS.
Toby Truslove	As an exchange student returning from Germany (via Phuket).	Dishonourable mention for portraying an exchange student who came back and gave his girlfriend dirty laundry and aftershave.
Heath Franklin	As an elite athlete responding to complaints about his training.	Dishonourable mention for playing an athlete whose main aim was drinking and getting caught on YouTube.
During the week	Cityside Waters	
Group scene	As a group of activity organizers for a tropical resort – Langbroek as the food specialist, Truslove as the clown, Sampson as the activity specialist and Franklin as the eco-manager.	

==== Episode 7: 17 June 2009 ====
Guest star	Scenario	Placement and why
Arj Barker	As a cult leader educating his followers (the unnamed cult in question apparently greatly influenced by Hinduism).	Honourable mention for playing a cult leader who wrote the book of demandments 'on the john'.
Josh Lawson	As a Submarine Captain who is explaining of their approaching fate, they are surrounded by German Submarines.^	Winner despite breaking a prop and sending naval recruitment back 20 years.
Felicity Ward	As a Wife of a criminal escaping the law, under investigation by the police.	Extra-honourable mention for the excuse, "Why is the sniffer-dog going crazy in the backyard?" "We fertilise with Pal."
Josie Long	As a Soap Opera star on set & filming the next episode.	Honourable mention for playing a soapie star allergic to being shot.
During the week	A Wedding Day featuring the Groom (Lawson), the bride (Long), Bride's best friend (Ward) & the best man (Barker)	
Group scene	As employees of an airline called JetPlus, they are running through everything.	

^ Instead of walking through the door, Josh followed a hidden corridor to the back of the set to appear as if climbing down a ladder in the submarine, then stepping over the raised entrance & began the scenario.

- This is the first episode ever to feature more than one female guest.

==== Episode 8: 24/25 June 2009 ====
Note: This episode aired on 24 June in Melbourne, Adelaide and Perth. It aired on 25 June 2009 in Sydney and Brisbane.

Guest star	Scenario	Placement and why
Anh Do	As Policeman Pete, a character on a children's show called "Playstreet".^	Honourable mention for playing an overweight policeman who tried to hit on a tree.
Julia Zemiro	As a sailor, speaking at her ex school about her solo trips around the world.	Winner for sailing around the world twice to raise money for middle-aged virgins.
Colin Lane	As a one armed captain of a British Man'o'war.	Dishonourable mention for playing a prop-destroying captain.
Adam Hills	As the supervisor of the construction of a new luxury apartment building, answering questions from investors.	Honourable mention for attempting to build a penthouse brothel.
During the week	Kool Deodorant	
Group scene	A post-game presentation ceremony at a sporting event, featuring broadcasters (one being Colin), the winning captain (Adam), his wife in hospital (Julia), and the corporate sponsor presenting the winner's trophy (Anh).	

^ - Anh had to enter through a back door due to the size of his costume.

==== Episode 9: 1 July 2009 ====
Guest star	Scenario	Placement and why
Akmal Saleh	As a prisoner up at his 14th parole hearing.	Dishonourable mention for trying to escape prison disguised as Ned Kelly.
Alan Brough	A count looking to join the Three Musketeers.	Honourable mention for willing to turn his back on wine, women and rather weird bird calls.
Merrick Watts	Part of an 80s trio now a duo looking to make a comeback.	Winner for putting up with a mullet, singing and weaving in a Phil Collins joke.
Rebel Wilson	Pensioner visited by her children about her worrying state of affairs.	Honourable mention for her fondness for sponge baths.
During the week	Carnival Family Restaurants	
Group scene	Employees of a colonial scene theme park – Saleh as a blacksmith, Brough as the Music Man, Watts as a police constable and Wilson as the sweet shop attendant.	

==== Episode 10: 8 July 2009 ====
Guest star	Scenario	Placement and why
Felicity Ward	As an aviator at a media conference	Honourable mention for demonstrating a mid-air wee.
Hamish Blake	As a contestant on a dating show, similar to The Bachelor	Winner for having a dream girl who had a face, didn't talk and could complete a tax return.
Josh Lawson	As a vampire meeting his girlfriend's parents	Honourable mention for the line, "I want to marry your daughter, and when she dies, I'll pick another daughter."
Angus Sampson	As a police officer at a law drafting conference, presenting a brand new initiative	Honourable mention for the season's most honest answer - "What do koalas have to do with cops?" "I'll be buggered if I know."
Toby Truslove	As the lieutenant of a space exploration capsule	Honourable mention for battling aliens and a rather dodgy door.
During the week	Breakin' Free	
Group scene	'Showbiz Squares' game show scenario: Sampson as the contestant; Blake, Truslove and Ward as the celebrities and Lawson as a show case model.	

== Series Five (2 August 2023 – 27 September 2023) ==
=== Series Five Guest stars ===
Guest star	Known for	Appearances	Wins	Honourable Mentions	Dishonourable Mentions
Hamish Blake	Comedian, actor, radio host	1	–	–	–
Melanie Bracewell	Actor/Comedian	1	–	–	1
Mark Bonanno	Actor/comedian	1	–	–	–
Michelle Brasier	Comedian, actor and writer	1	–	1	–
Fifi Box	Fox FM radio host	1	–	1	–
Urzila Carlson	Comedian	2	–	1	1
Aaron Chen	Comedian	2	–	1	1
Joel Creasey	Comedian, television presenter, Nova 100 radio host	1	–	–	1
Kitty Flanagan	Comedian, actor, writer	1	–	–	–
Virginia Gay	Actor, writer, director	1	1	–	–
Geraldine Hickey	Comedian	1	–	–	–
Emma Holland	Comedian	2	1	–	1
He Huang	Comedian	1	–	1	–
Lloyd Langford	Comedian	2	1	1	–
Luke McGregor	Comedian, actor, writer	1	–	–	–
Frankie McNair	Comedian	1	1	–	–
Guy Montgomery	Comedian	2	1	–	1
Julia Morris	Comedian, television host, actor	1	–	1	–
Rhys Nicholson	Comedian, television personality	1	1	–	–
Ross Noble	Comedian	1	–	–	–
Ray O'Leary	Comedian, writer	1	–	–	1
Marty Sheargold	Comedian, Triple M radio host	2	1	–	1
Dane Simpson	Comedian	1	–	1	–
Danielle Walker	Actor/comedian	1	–	1	–
Julia Zemiro	Comedian, television host	2	1	1	–

=== Series Five Episode overview ===
Denotes the Winner, or Joint Winner

==== Episode 1: 2 August 2023 ====
Guest judge: Glenn Robbins

Guest star	Scenario	Placement and why
Aaron Chen	As a firefighter visiting a school classroom during fire awareness week to teach students about fire safety.	Dishonourable mention for starting more fires than he could ever put out.
Julia Zemiro	As a wife at an airport border control being questioned about her trip to Bali and South America.	Winner and discouragement award for swallowing four watches, of which one was implied to have been given to guest judge Glenn as a "little present".
Urzila Carlson	As a Victorian lady meeting a suitor, the Earl of Sandwich, who faces advances from the suitor's brother.	Honourable mention for surviving an 18th-century threesome.
Mark Bonanno	As a technology entrepreneur and activist being interviewed on a late-night talk show "Tonights Show" (a la The Tonight Show). (Note: Featured Ryan Moloney (Neighbours' Toadie) as a guest performer.)	Encouragement award for being Elon Musk but without a rocket.
Group scene	A talent show "Aussie Star Search" (a la Australia's Got Talent) (Note: Featured Todd McKenney as a guest performer.) – Bonanno and Zemiro as judges, Carlson as a contestant's mother with fellow family members and Chen as a ventriloquist being interviewed backstage (Note: Instead of walking through the door, Mark and Julia sat on a panel within the studio audience, alongside guest performer Todd McKenney.)	

==== Episode 2: 9 August 2023 ====
Guest judge: Judith Lucy

Guest star	Scenario	Placement and why
Lloyd Langford	As a colonel giving his unit their final briefing before raiding a Mexican drug lord.	Winner for managing to use the word "Imodium" in his scene.
Geraldine Hickey	As a 40-year old fast food chicken restaurant worker living in her parents' home, returning to a confrontation in her room.	
Luke McGregor	As a medieval general in a council planning for an uprising (a la Game Of Thrones).	
Fifi Box	As the leader of a cell block of female prison inmates who is being introduced to a new inmate (a la Wentworth).	Honourable mention for being the nicest bully ever.
Group scene	An election night television broadcast called "Australia Decides" – McGregor as a co-host, Hickey as an election analyst expert, Langford and Box as candidates being interviewed	

==== Episode 3: 23 August 2023 ====
Guest judge: Tony Martin

Guest star	Scenario	Placement and why
Danielle Walker	As a co-host of a tropical island-themed dating show, called "Seduction Cove".	Honourable mention for making the dating show so effective.
Guy Montgomery	As the designer of a new phone, called the "ProVid TR40".	Dishonourable mention for making a phone which had the main feature of looking "exactly like all the other phones".
Virginia Gay	As a rebellious midwife nun being confronted by her fellow sisters for disobeying the order's vows.	Winner for cycling into a maternity ward, carrying a pregnant woman and making up a song.
Aaron Chen	As the store manager of a jewellery store, helping a sheikh choose a gift for his wife.	Honourable mention for demonstrating incredible martial arts skills and an extraordinary Danish accent.
Group scene	Members of a Danish rock band announcing their reunion at a media conference.	

- Note: The episode airdate was delayed for one week, from 16 August to 23 August 2023, due to the FIFA Women's World Cup semi-finals.

==== Episode 4: 30 August 2023 ====
Guest judge: Josh Lawson

Guest star	Scenario	Placement and why
He Huang	As a television infomercial doctor and founder of a skin care company called "Quint-essence", selling anti-aging cream, massage guns and bio-beds.	Honourable mention for lending a massage gun to guest judge Josh during the ad break.
Ross Noble	As an astronaut participating in a television interview, prior to boarding their spacecraft to dock at the International Space Station.	Discouragement award for bringing zero-gravity unicycling into outer-space.
Emma Holland	As an early 19th-century woman in ripped clothing from a poor family, who returns home after visiting the doctor for her sick father, before the colony's Governor and a soldier walk in.	Winner and dishonourable mention for turning roadkill into a scarf.
Hamish Blake	As a team member of a pitch for a new sport to a television network executive panel, called "Big Bash Croquet", similarly named to the Big Bash League.	Encouragement award for refraining from "front-patting" a female colleague.
Group scene	The reunion episode of the country dating show "Love on the Land" (a la The Farmer Wants a Wife) – Holland as the relationship expert, Blake and Noble as farmers, Huang as a contestant	

==== Episode 5: 6 September 2023 ====
Guest judge: Peter Helliar

Guest star	Scenario	Placement and why
Ray O'Leary	As a Spanish matador preparing for a bullfight.	Discouragement award for planning to take his bull out with a bazooka.
Michelle Brasier	As a patisserie employee undergoing their first annual performance review.	"Rising Star" award with the patisserie's loss being comedy's gain.
Marty Sheargold	As a children's television presenter of "Kid's Corner" (a la Play School). (Note: Instead of walking through the door, Marty came through the back instead and followed a hidden corridor to enter the set through a tiny children's-sized door.)	Winner and "Descending Star" reward for descending into the black soul of an unlikely Wiggle.
Julia Morris	As a detective, wearing a flapper dress, solving a murder in the 1920s (a la Miss Fisher's Murder Mysteries).	Encouragement award for a glorious performance and being a legend.
Group scene	Television broadcast of the funeral of a viscount, a member of the British extended royal family – Brasier as the royal correspondent, Sheargold as a friend being interviewed, Morris as the viscount's personal assistant being interviewed and O'Leary as a reporter within the funeral procession crowd	

==== Episode 6: 13 September 2023 ====
Guest judge: Colin Lane

Guest star	Scenario	Placement and why
Frankie McNair	As a speaker at a speech night of a prestigious high school, presenting her valedictorian address alongside two co-captains.	Winner for slotting into the character of a bully very naturally.
Lloyd Langford	As part of a couple holidaying in Far North Queensland, returning their damaged hire car two days late.	Honourable mention for driving from Cooktown to Broome without a license.
Julia Zemiro	As a French duchess in a corset and dress, sharing the secret to being the "most desirable woman in Europe" whilst rejecting suitors, before being asked by her duke husband why she remains childless, when it is revealed the duchess has cheated on him with an Italian suitor. (Note: Instead of walking through the door, Julia came through the back instead, where she had to ride a forklift up to the top of the set to enter from the top of a staircase.)	Honourable mention for dreaming of a forklift centuries before it was invented.
Joel Creasey	As a contestant in the elimination round of a cooking show, called "Kompetition Kitchen" (a la MasterChef Australia), revealing his dishes to the judges. (Note: Featured Poh Ling Yeow as a guest performer.)	Dishonourable mention for looking on the bright side and thinking that scores of "4", "3" and "3" was "433".
Group scene	Dressed in all black, as a group of criminals preparing for a heist of a museum's annual ball, specifically of a pearl necklace being worn by a Sammarinese princess.	

==== Episode 7: 20 September 2023 ====
Guest judge: Adam Hills

Guest star	Scenario	Placement and why
Melanie Bracewell	As a misbehaving princess being confronted by her advisors. (Note: Instead of walking through the door, Melanie came through the back instead, to enter the set though climbing through a window.)	Dishonourable mention for being a potty-mouthed princess dressed in Portmans.
Rhys Nicholson	As a Roman general named Iberius, returning from a loss at war and meeting the Emperor and his wife. (Note: Instead of walking through the door, Rhys came through the back instead and entered on a horse-drawn chariot.)	Winner for bringing both Airbnb and helmet hair to Roman times.
Dane Simpson	As a zookeeper co-hosting a school group's animal presentation at "Ozzie Wildlife Centre & Zoo".	Honourable mention for being the first person to be both woke and inappropriate, by introducing both koala porn and gender being a concept.
Urzila Carlson	As Simone, a contestant in a jungle-based reality series, returning to camp late from a food trial group challenge before being eliminated in an eviction ceremony (a la I'm a Celebrity...Get Me Out of Here!). (Note: Instead of walking through the door, Urzila came through the back instead, with two ensemble cast members dressed as contestants in red shirts and khaki pants, to appear as though they were returning from a challenge though walking through some bushes.) (Note: Featured Grant Denyer as a guest performer.)	Dishonourable mention for stating that she had done charity work for children with "sticky-outy ears".
Group scene	A breakfast show called "Mornings" – Bracewell as a co-host, Carlson as a finance expert, Nicholson as a television doctor and Simpson as a roaming weatherman visiting a country town	

==== Episode 8: 27 September 2023 ====
Guest judges: Glenn Robbins & Tom Gleisner

Guest star	Scenario	Placement and why
Kitty Flanagan	As a resort manager dealing with customers complaining about their room. (Note: Featured a walk-on cameo by ensemble director and former ensemble cast member Ed Kavalee.)	The "Best Entrance" Award, for kicking down the door and hugging the host.
Marty Sheargold	As a sex therapist who is promoting his new book on a morning panel show, "Morning Chat" (a la Studio 10 and Loose Women).	The "Most Dubious Advice" Award, for saying "It's okay to stray on a Saturday night".
Emma Holland	As an amateur entrepreneur hoping to receive investment in a new product, Luminoskin (a la Shark Tank).	The "That's Never Happened" Award, for slapping an ensemble member.
Guy Montgomery	As a 1930s bar owner who starts to make a deal to sell his bar, while charming a love interest (a la Casablanca). (Note: Featured a cameo by Miguel Maestre.)	Winner and the "Let's Hope the Kids are in Bed" Award, for naming his bar after his first wet dream.
Group scene	An alien spaceship led by the first officer (Montgomery) and captain (Flanagan), trying to stop the villain (Sheargold), with the help of a fighter pilot (Holland).	

== Series Six (14 August 2024 – 16 October 2024) ==
=== Series Six Guest stars ===
Guest star	Known for	Appearances	Wins	Honourable Mentions	Dishonourable Mentions
Ivan Aristeguieta	Comedian	1	–	–	–
Hamish Blake	Comedian, actor, radio host	2	–	–	–
Melanie Bracewell	Comedian, actor	2	1	–	–
Michelle Brasier	Comedian, actor and writer	1	–	–	–
Urzila Carlson	Comedian, actor	2	–	–	–
Aaron Chen	Comedian, actor	1	1	–	–
Zoë Coombs Marr	Comedian, actor	1	–	–	–
Gillian Cosgriff	Comedian	1	–	–	–
Anne Edmonds	Comedian, actor	2	1	–	–
Virginia Gay	Actor, writer and director	1	–	–	–
Geraldine Hickey	Comedian	1	–	–	-
Emma Holland	Comedian	2	1	–	–
Lloyd Langford	Comedian, writer	2	–	–	–
Bron Lewis	Comedian	1	1	–	–
Ting Lim	Comedian	1	–	–	–
Tommy Little	Comedian, actor and radio host	1	–	–	–
Luke McGregor	Comedian, actor, writer	1	–	–	–
Frankie McNair	Comedian	1	–	–	–
Guy Montgomery	Comedian	3	1	–	–
Anisa Nandaula	Comedian	1	–	–	–
Rhys Nicholson	Comedian, actor	1	1	–	–
Ross Noble	Comedian, actor	1	–	–	–
Ray O'Leary	Comedian, actor	1	1	–	–
Nina Oyama	Comedian, actor and writer	1	–	–	–
Sam Pang	Comedian, actor and writer	2	1	–	–
Chris Parker	Comedian, actor and writer	1	1	–	–
Peter Rowsthorn	Comedian, actor and writer	1	–	–	–
Marty Sheargold	Comedian, radio host	1	–	–	–
Takashi Wakasugi	Comedian	1	–	–	–
Felicity Ward	Comedian, writer	1	–	–	–
Merrick Watts	Comedian, radio/television personality	1	–	–	–
Susie Youssef	Comedian, actor and writer	1	–	–	–

=== Series Six Episode overview ===
Denotes the Winner, or Joint Winner

==== Episode 1: 14 August 2024 ====
746,000 nationwide viewers
Guest judge: Adam Hills

Guest star	Scenario	Placement and why
Frankie McNair	As a doctor checking up on her patients in a hospital ward. (Note: Glenn Robbins makes a guest appearance as Russell Coight from All Aussie Adventures.)	Hills gave McNair a piece of paper with Russell Coight's phone number after breaking character and screaming when he appeared in the scenario.
Sam Pang	As an English highwayman who returns to his favorite pub after a heist.	Hills gave Pang "the Gun" for "leaving (the gun) in the carpark".
Anne Edmonds	As a 1910s nanny as she meets her employer and his children.	Winner, after Hills asked the audience sitting around him who their favourite performance was, all said Edmonds. Hills also gave her the "Working with Children Check" award, after her performance in the scenario.
Hamish Blake	As a mountaineer who is giving a talk to a group of children about his climb of Mount Everest.	Hills gave Blake the "Woodchopping Badge", as he felt "he needed less wood".
Group scene	Cast of a lifestyle TV show Better Living (a la The Living Room) with Blake as a gardening expert, McNair as a pet specialist, Edmonds as a tradeswoman and Pang as a chef.	

==== Episode 2: 21 August 2024 ====
598,000 nationwide viewers
Guest judge: Julia Morris

Guest star	Scenario	Placement and why
Geraldine Hickey	As a guide, who is taking a group of people camping in the outback.	Mention for a unique explanation of how to use a shovel.
Guy Montgomery	As a James Bond-type villain who plans to drill into the earth's core.	Winner, for making Morris jealous of his performance in his scenario calling it "silky-smooth".
Melanie Bracewell	As a children's performer being confronted by her angry co-workers.	Mention for her versatility in playing a children's performer and the Aunty in the group scene.
Ross Noble	As a leader of an expedition in Antarctica.	Mention for having a room full of applause for his performance when he entered the scenario and didn't say a word.
Group scene	As part of The Famous Five-like scenario which Hickey and Montgomery as children who goes on adventures during the holiday break. Bracewell plays their aunt and Noble is a policeman, who informs them about the activities of smugglers.	

==== Episode 3: 28 August 2024 ====
590,000 nationwide viewers
Guest judge: Tony Martin

Guest star	Scenario	Placement and why
Merrick Watts	As a husband hosting a family BBQ.	Mention for playing a man who got married in his mother-in-law's wedding dress.
Michelle Brasier	As a 16th-century countess attending a meeting with King Henry VIII.	Mention for singing and dancing and because she "fed the king a strawberry".
Emma Holland	As a contestant on a TV quiz show Smart Seat (a la Millionaire Hot Seat).	Mention for telling a pair of quiz show hosts "I hate you too".
Rhys Nicholson	As a construction site manager being confronted by unhappy clients, asking questions about their new house. (Note: Featured a cameo from former The Block contestants Mitch Edwards & Mark McKie.)	Winner, for creating one of the strangest characters ever seen (group scene). A mention for adding "rotten salmon to the Dulux colour chart".
Group scene	With Nicholson as the “Relationship Expert” and the others as participants of the reality TV show Married in a Minute, which they marry and live with a total stranger (a la Married at First Sight).	

==== Episode 4: 4 September 2024 ====
585,000 nationwide viewers
Guest judge: Wendy Harmer

Guest star	Scenario	Placement and why
Aaron Chen	As a pilot calming down restless passengers while their flight is caught in a holding pattern.	Winner for making a joke about gingivitis during the group scene. Honourable mention for creating a 1000 year old pilot.
Gillian Cosgriff	As a spiritual healer who is challenged in court for selling dodgy wellness products and misinformed practices.	Honourable mention for sharing the stage with an alpaca called Menora.
Luke McGregor	As an army captain who is a prisoner of war trying to escape with the help of the French.	Dishonourable mention for attempting to escape from his own scenario.
Urzila Carlson	As a nun who is the principal of a private school, justifying her expensive purchases, and unusual methods of teaching and discipline.	Honourable mention for being a rapping nun with the motto "Big Bitches 4 Real".
Group scene	As a team of equestrian professionals who are being reprimanded after an awful competition.	

==== Episode 5: 11 September 2024 ====
596,000 nationwide viewers
Guest judge: Colin Lane

Guest star	Scenario	Placement and why
Susie Youssef	As a housemate who is told off for excessive power usage and unhealthy eating habits by her environmentally and health-conscious housemates.	Mention for "being in the shower since 1982" and saying to Gay during the group scene "You packed your personality in that suitcase".
Ray O'Leary	As a fighter pilot returning to train future fighter pilots (a la Top Gun: Maverick).	Winner and mention for sending out a mayday because he "had more than 7 kilos of luggage."
Virginia Gay	As a nun who is on trial for witchcraft.	Mention for taking a 17th-century church hall and weaving Lil Nas X into it.
Lloyd Langford	As explorer Marco Polo, returning from his adventures.	Mention for introducing the rest of the world to Chicken salt.
Group scene	An elimination episode of the TV show "Hook-up Cove" (a la Love Island). Langford was a host, O'Leary, Youssef and Gay were contestants, the latter arriving mid-scene as a previously eliminated "second chance" contestant.	

==== Episode 6: 18 September 2024 ====
Guest judge: Lawrence Mooney

Guest star	Scenario	Placement and why
Tommy Little	As a Spartan soldier returning from war with the Athenians during ancient Greece.	Extra points for being modest and crossing his legs when sitting on the pillar.
Emma Holland	As a woman in the 1950s on her honeymoon in Rome with her rich, much older husband when she is swept off her feet by a young, handsome Italian man.	Winner for using a bread roll as a serviette.
Zoë Coombs Marr	As the captain of a women's cricket team taking them on a camping trip during a torrential storm.	Extra points for the fear on her face when she saw the children come out of the caravan.
Marty Sheargold	As an inappropriate Santa Claus undergoing a performance review.	Extra points for "convincing children that there really is a special part of Christmas" and forgetting the children's names.
Group scene	A conservative news program called "Sunday Standoff" (a la Sky News Australia), with Coombs Marr as a journalist, Little as a senator, Sheargold as a podcast host being interviewed and Holland as a protester.	

==== Episode 7: 25 September 2024 ====
Guest judge: Peter Helliar

Guest star	Scenario	Placement and why
Takashi Wakasugi	As an executive chef answering questions from guests about the menu on offer.	Encouragement award for the line "no meal is complete without oranges".
Melanie Bracewell	As a woman who finds out she won a reality survival competition show (a la Alone) after surviving 157 days in the wilderness.	Winner for turning a pile of bones into sex toys. Honourable mention for beginning the scenario with no actors in the scene with her while somehow pregnant.
Ting Lim	As an au pair being reprimanded of her irresponsible conduct by the mother and father of the household.	Dishonourable mention for sending a golden retriever to Dan Murphy's to get her beers.
Guy Montgomery	As a cop in 1970s Los Angeles trying to stop his demotion to office-based work after forgetting to find evidence for his case (a la Starsky & Hutch).	Discouragement award for getting into a dick-measuring contest while fighting for his job.
Group scene	A New Year's Eve broadcast, with Lim and Montgomery on the hosts panel, Bracewell as a reporter in Kiribati and Wakasugi hosting his own party in Adelaide.	

==== Episode 8: 2 October 2024 ====
Guest judge: Stephen Curry

Guest star	Scenario	Placement and why
Nina Oyama	As a cruise ship tour guide in Greece giving instructions and the daily schedule to the passengers.	Dishonourable mention for telling members of her tour-group to "dig a hole and stay there".
Chris Parker	As a 12th-century Viking being given an ultimatum on his recent activities.	Winner for playing a Viking, desperate to connect with his softer side.
Anne Edmonds	As a self-help influencer on a morning TV program (a la Studio 10 and The View) discussing their podcast and book 'Live, Laugh, Love'.	Bravery award for playing a psychotic self-help author with a passion for yoga and doing the downward dog towards the audience.
Peter Rowsthorn	As a renowned Italian painter who meets a king that wants a new architectural feature in their church.	Honourable mention for creating an Italian painter with a French accent who almost, literally, set himself on fire.
Group scene	A group of children's performers being told off by off-stage staff after a terrible show. Oyama was a bee; Parker, a pirate; Edmonds, a police officer; and Rowsthorn, a kangaroo.	

==== Episode 9: 9 October 2024 ====
Guest judge: Magda Szubanski

Guest star	Scenario	Placement and why
Ivan Aristeguieta	As a pilot who is going to fly around across the world in his homemade plane, being interviewed on TV.	Mention for an introduction to Tito who doubles as buoyancy device and a third member of a truffle.
Bron Lewis	As a doctor during the Second War of Scottish Independence.	Mention for giving an accent and doing some highlander breakdancing. Winner for selling cars and having a Cert III from Tafe.
Lloyd Langford	As a detective investigating a murder in the woods.	Mention for playing a British detective and for using the phrase "hairy areola".
Felicity Ward	As the leader of a fox hunting club asking questions from the club's members.	Mention for playing a foxy fox hunting lady and the first person to almost give out their phone number.
Group scene	Set in the 19th century during the gold rush with Langford as a miner, Lewis as a scantily clad woman who is entertaining the miners, Aristeguieta as a commissioner and Ward as a bushranger.	

==== Episode 10: 16 October 2024 ====
Guest judge: Shane Jacobson

Guest star	Scenario	Placement and why
Sam Pang	As Lord Babblington, a bachelor attending a party. (Note: Featured a cameo from former cast member and Pang's fellow Have You Been Paying Attention? co-star Ed Kavalee.)	Mention for putting down his horses while still somehow being able to ride away from the scene. Winner for calling for his own buzzer halfway through his scenario.
Guy Montgomery	As an elderly man being questioned by a social worker about his health.	Mention for creating a senior citizen who can out run a peregrine falcon.
Urzila Carlson	As a recently widowed queen being confronted by her people. (Note: Featured a cameo from former resident judge Tom Gleisner.)	Mention for being a queen who told her royal gardener that he looked like "a gnome who gone off".
Anisa Nandaula	As a cruise ship crew member being questioned by the captain.	Mention for playing a deck hand who believed that she could find poor people directly below her.
Hamish Blake	As the wizard Merlin, attending to a request from Lady Guinevere.	Mention for answering the riddle "What is closed when it's open, open when it's closed?" with 7-Eleven.
Group scene	A morning news program called Daybreak News which is reporting on a flood disaster; with Carlson as a presenter, Montgomery as a meteorologist, Pang as the deputy director of Disaster Services, Nandaula as a pop star, and Blake as the owner of a pub.	
