= Thank God You're Here (disambiguation) =

Thank God You're Here is an Australian television improvised comedy program.

Thank God You're Here may also refer to:

- Dieu merci!, French language television program based on above
- Thank God You're Here (American TV series), American television program based on above
- Thank God You're Here (British TV series), British television program based on above

== See also ==
- Thank Goodness You're Here!, 2024 comedy adventure game
