= Thank God You're Here =

Australian improvised comedy television program

- Created by: Working Dog Productions
- Presented by: Shane Bourne; Celia Pacquola
- Judges: Tom Gleisner; Various guest judges
- Opening theme: "Come Anytime" by Hoodoo Gurus
- Country of origin: Australia
- Original language: English
- No. of seasons: 6
- No. of episodes: 59 (list of episodes)

Production
- Executive producers: Santo Cilauro; Tom Gleisner; Michael Hirsh; Rob Sitch
- Production locations: Global Television Studios, Nunawading, Victoria (2006–2007); Melbourne Showgrounds, Flemington, Victoria (2009; 2023–)
- Running time: 60 minutes (including commercials)
- Production company: Working Dog Productions

Original release
- Network: Network 10
- Release: 5 April 2006 – 26 September 2007
- Network: Seven Network
- Release: 29 April – 8 July 2009
- Network: Network 10
- Release: 2 August 2023 – 16 October 2024

Thank God You're Here is an Australian television improvised comedy program created by Working Dog Productions, which premiered on 5 April 2006 on Network 10, where it aired for the first three and from the fifth season onwards; the fourth season aired on the Seven Network.

Each episode involves performers walking through a door into an unknown situation, greeted by the line "Thank God you're here!". They then have to improvise their way through the scene. At the end of each episode a winner is announced. It was the most successful new show in Australia of 2006, attracting an average of 1.7 million viewers after the first few episodes.

The show was originally hosted by Shane Bourne and judged by Tom Gleisner. After a fourteen year hiatus, it was revived for a fifth series, hosted by Celia Pacquola and featuring a guest judge each episode. The format is sold for recreation in a number of countries. The sixth series of the show aired in 2024. The series won’t screen in 2025 due to production fatigue.

== Synopsis ==
Each contestant is dressed in appropriate costume, has some brief banter with the host, and is then invited to "walk through the blue door" onto a hidden set. They are greeted by the ensemble cast, in character, with the line "Thank God you're here!", and must then attempt to improvise their role in the scene. Typically they will be asked in-character questions by the ensemble cast and challenged to provide information about the scene, including the names of characters or objects.

At least twice during each episode (to cover set-up and costuming for the live audience), footage is shown of each of the four participants performing a challenge, often on location, which was filmed earlier in the week. These include a commentary booth where the contestants have to comment on an unfamiliar subject, an office where they are being interviewed or interrogated (by police, customs officials, etc.), showing customers things for sale (cars, boats, pianos, houses, etc.), or advertisements (e.g. slimming products, housing developments, etc.). The other characters in these scenes are generally played by members of the ensemble cast. The third series also introduced an additional segment in which Gleisner highlights a "real life" Thank God You're Here-style situation, such as the infamous Guy Goma BBC interview and frequently, that of politicians forced to improvise answers under pressure.

Finally, when all the contestants have played in a scene by themselves, all four enter a final scene together for the "all-in group challenge". At the end of the show, the judge declares a winner; this choice is entirely at the judge's discretion, and is largely arbitrary. Honorable and dishonorable mentions are also given, usually to contestants who do not win so that the judge can comment on their performances. The winner receives a trophy in the shape of the programme's blue door logo.

There are variations on the standard setup: occasionally the greeting will be slightly changed to better suit the setting (e.g. "Thank the gods you're here!" for a scene featuring Vikings or "Thank God you're alive" in a scene featuring a car accident), and often an alternative entrance will be built into the set. These are often used for comic effect, as in the aforementioned car accident scenario where the contestant (Matthew Newton) climbed through the back of the set and emerged from the door of a wrecked car embedded in the wall of a second-storey flat.

=== First revived series ===
The fourth season introduced a different segment, where Gleisner points out that he believes an Australian cricket player is able to endorse anything, and presents a falsified advertisement where a retired Australian cricketer (Damien Fleming) attempts to endorse an also falsified company of a completely random field (such as a French restaurant or sewage processing plant). Running gags in these segments include the cricketer comparing selecting such a company with his medium pace bowling, the use of "jargon" which actually is completely made-up, comparing the reliability (or other value) with his own bowling style, and a man named "Steve" who is called upon to agree with this previous statement ("bit like my bowling, eh, Steve?")

=== Second revived series ===
Since series 5, the format of the show has been tweaked slightly as the performers no longer participate in any "during in the week" scenes, which were in previous seasons filmed on-location with the ensemble cast. In addition, the role of judge which was originated by Tom Gleisner, is now fulfilled by a rotating special guest judge each week, whose remarks after each performance are more brief.

== Ensemble cast ==
Although their parts are thoroughly scripted, the actors who interact with the guest stars in each scenario are drawn from an ensemble of experienced improvisational actors.

Improvisation experience is preferred so that the cast can react appropriately and immediately to the improvisations of the guest stars, though in most cases this improvisation is limited. This ensemble was also used in many of the mid-week assignments, fulfilling the roles of customers or members of the public with whom the guests must interact in a real-life setting.

The following are regular ensemble cast members who have appeared on the show:

- Amy Ruffle (series 5–)
- Andrew Bayly (series 1–4)
- Barney Pollock (series 5–)
- Ben Anderson (series 2–4)
- Ben Russell (series 5–)
- Carlo Ritchie (series 5–)
- Daniel Cordeaux (series 1–4)
- Ed Kavalee (series 1–4, series 5– as ensemble director)
- Heidi Arena
- Isabella Dunwill (series 2)
- Jake Lonergan (series 5–)
- Jason Geary (series 5–)
- Macie Daniel (series 5–)
- Nicola Parry
- Pedro Cooray (series 5–)
- Rebekah Foord (series 1–3)
- Riley Nottingham (series 5–)
- Rob Lloyd (series 6–)
- Roz Hammond (series 3–4)
- Simon Dowling (series 1–4)
- Simon Russell (series 2–4)
- Tiana Hogben (series 5–)

Several special guests have also appeared, either playing themselves or as part of the ensemble cast for a scene. Special guests have included Damien Fleming, Dan O'Connor, Melissa Tkautz Natalie Bassingthwaighte, Kate Ceberano, Alan Fletcher, Kimberley Davies, Matt Welsh, Mark Holden, Ryan Moloney, Simon Burke, Greg Evans, Nikki Webster, Mick Molloy, Todd McKenney, Poh Ling Yeow, Grant Denyer, Miguel Maestre and The Veronicas. Other guests including Jane Hall, Andy Lee and Don Burke have appeared as mock presenters in the locational challenges.

== Appearances ==
Contestant	Appearances	Show wins
Hamish Blake	13	3
Angus Sampson	11	3
Julia Zemiro	10	3
Josh Lawson	9	3
Merrick Watts	8	3
Peter Rowsthorn	8	2
Fifi Box	8	1
Cal Wilson	7	3
Shaun Micallef	7	2
Frank Woodley	6	1
Akmal Saleh	6	1
Tony Martin	6	1
Bob Franklin	5	3
Guy Montgomery	5	2
Emma Holland	4	2
Rebel Wilson	4	1
Anh Do	4	1
Lloyd Langford	4	1
Urzila Carlson	4	0
Matthew Newton	3	1
Dave Hughes	3	1
Arj Barker	3	1
Kate Langbroek	3	1
Alan Brough	3	1
Ross Noble	3	1
Aaron Chen	3	1
Marty Sheargold	3	1
Melanie Bracewell	3	1
Felicity Ward	3	0
Rhys Nicholson	2	2
Colin Lane	2	1
Carl Barron	2	1
Josie Long	2	1
Frankie McNair	2	1
Ray O'Leary	2	1
Virginia Gay	2	1
Anne Edmonds	2	1
Sam Pang	2	1
Glenn Robbins	2	0
Robyn Butler	2	0
Ryan Shelton	2	0
Tahir Bilgiç	2	0
Kate Jenkinson	2	0
Jo Stanley	2	0
Peter Helliar	2	0
Stephen Curry	2	0
Nish	2	0
Toby Truslove	2	0
Julia Morris	2	0
Geraldine Hickey	2	0
Michelle Brasier	2	0
Luke McGregor	2	0
Anthony Field	1	1
Jimeoin	1	1
Jordan Raskopoulos	1	1
Chris Parker	1	1
Bron Lewis	1	1
Santo Cilauro	1	0
Tanya Bulmer	1	0
Dalian Evans	1	0
Bianca Dye	1	0
Russell Gilbert	1	0
Andrew Günsberg	1	0
Stephen K Amos	1	0
Eddie Ifft	1	0
Matt Tilley	1	0
Sean Choolburra	1	0
Adam Hills	1	0
Franklyn Ajaye	1	0
Heath Franklin	1	0
Rhys Darby	1	0
Rob Carlton	1	0
Tom Gleeson	1	0
Mark Bonanno	1	0
Danielle Walker	1	0
He Huang	1	0
Joel Creasey	1	0
Dane Simpson	1	0
Kitty Flanagan	1	0
Gillian Cosgriff	1	0
Susie Youssef	1	0
Tommy Little	1	0
Zoë Coombs Marr	1	0
Takashi Wakasugi	1	0
Ting Lim	1	0
Nina Oyama	1	0
Ivan Aristeguieta	1	0
Anisa Nandaula	1	0

== Episodes ==
Series	Episodes	Originally released			Host	Viewers	Rank
Series	Episodes	First released	Last released	Network	Host	Viewers	Rank
1	10	5 April 2006	7 June 2006	Network Ten	Shane Bourne	1,729,000	#2
2	10	6 September 2006	8 November 2006	Network Ten	Shane Bourne	1,773,000	#1
3	11	11 July 2007	26 September 2007	Network Ten	Shane Bourne	1,860,000	#2
4	10	29 April 2009	8 July 2009	Seven Network	Shane Bourne	1,516,000	#1
5	8	2 August 2023	27 September 2023	Network 10	Celia Pacquola	TBA	TBA
6	10	12 August 2024	16 October 2024	Network 10	Celia Pacquola	TBA	TBA

== Show promotion ==
Host Shane Bourne and judge Tom Gleisner appeared on Rove Live on 11 April 2006, to promote the show after the first episode had screened. After an interview with Rove McManus, they participated in a game McManus called Where The Bloody Hell Have You Been, a play on words of the Australian tourism campaign, "So Where The Bloody Hell Are You?". In this game they had to perform, without preparation, a situation involving a funeral, and the reading of an improvised eulogy, following exactly the same format as Thank God You're Here.

== Music ==
The main theme is "Come Anytime" by Hoodoo Gurus. A piece used throughout the interludes of the first season of the show is "Don't You Know Who I Am", performed by Small Mercies.

In the second season, new music was also used in addition to the main themes:

- "Reminder" by Kisschasy
- "Pellet Gun" by Small Mercies

In the third season, more new music was used in addition to the main themes:

- "Everlasting" by Horsell Common
- "Beautiful Disguise" by Tokenview

== Production and broadcast schedule ==
=== First Network 10 iteration (2006–2007) ===
The final episode of Season One, in which the actor Angus Sampson won, had 2.13 million viewers nationally.

The second series of the show ran from 6 September to 8 November 2006, at a 7:30 pm AEST timeslot. The ratings for the second season place the show in the top three shows watched in Australia boosting the ratings of follow-up show House on the network and placing the show up with ratings juggernaut Border Security: Australia's Front Line which broadcasts on the Seven Network. Thank God You're Here received an average of two million viewers every week. For the last episode of 2006 (8 November), had received ratings of 1.85 million viewers nationally.

The first episode of Series Three was filmed on 21 June 2007. Guests for this episode included Stephen Curry, Josh Lawson, Peter Helliar and Cal Wilson. Series Three had begun at the same 7:30 pm time slot on Wednesday 11 July 2007.

=== Seven Network iteration (2009) ===
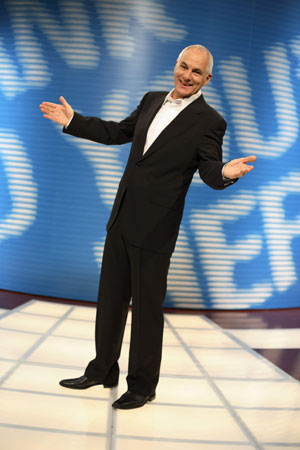
Host Shane Bourne at the show's Melbourne Showgrounds set in 2009

In late 2008, it was announced that a revival of the show would be made which would air on the Seven Network instead of Network Ten. With Global Television Studios in Nunawading getting ready to shut down, Series 4 started filming at Melbourne Showgrounds in Flemington, in the shed normally used as the Poultry Pavilion. With the move from Nunawading also came a move from Global to Cutting Edge as the broadcast provider. Shooting started on Thursday 19 March 2009, in front of a live studio audience of 500 people. At the recording of episode 2 on 26 March, Tom Gleisner told the audience they could not find an available studio big enough for all their sets and large studio audience, so started looking at other types of venues, and found what they needed at the showgrounds. Portable buildings were set up outside the pavilion for use as offices, dressing rooms and other production amenities. Another vacant pavilion was used to house the audience before taping. The new venue was an issue for audio, as there was no soundproofing, so the nearby railway line often interfered with scenes, and Gleisner remarked that if it had rained, they would have been "stuffed".

=== Second Network 10 iteration (2023–present) ===
In April 2023, Network 10 confirmed that a fifth series had been commissioned as a second revival of the show. Celia Pacquola was announced as the host and it was revealed that the series would feature weekly guest judges, a new ensemble cast and a "new generation" of special guests. The second revival was also filmed at the Melbourne Showgrounds.

== Awards ==
Year	Award	Category	Result	Ref.
2007	TV Week Logies	Most Popular Light Entertainment Program	Nominated	
2007	TV Week Logies	Most Outstanding Comedy Program	Won	
2008	TV Week Logies	Most Outstanding Comedy Program	Nominated	
2008	TV Week Logies	Most Popular Light Entertainment Program	Nominated	
2010	TV Week Logies	Most Outstanding Light Entertainment	Nominated	
2025	TV Week Logies	Best Competition Reality Program	Nominated	

== Release ==
=== Home media ===
All series of the show have been released on DVD in Australia. Season 1 was released on 8 November 2006, Season 2 was released on 23 August 2007, Season 3 was released on 28 November 2007 and Season 4 was released on 5 November 2009.

Thank God You're Here — The Complete Series One
Set details	Special features
10 Episodes; 51 Scenarios; 3 Disc Set; 16:9 Aspect Ratio; Subtitles: English for the hearing impaired; English audio (Dolby Digital 2.0 and 5.1)	Behind the scenes documentary; Unscreened highlights; Vintage Frank Woodley performance from the pilot; Hard copy Thank God You're Here game built into the DVD cover
Release dates
Region 4
8 November 2006

Thank God You're Here — The Complete Series Two
Set details	Special features
10 Episodes; 51 Scenarios; 3 Disc Set; 16:9 Aspect Ratio; Subtitles: English for the hearing impaired; Audio: English (Dolby Digital 2.0 and 5.1) & English narration for the sight impaired.	No special features are included.
Release dates
Region 4
23 August 2007

Thank God You're Here — The Complete Series Three
Set details	Special features
11 Episodes; 56 Scenarios; 3 Disc Set; 16:9 Aspect Ratio; Subtitles: English for the hearing impaired; English audio (Dolby Digital 2.0 and 5.1)	No special features are included.
Release dates
Region 4
28 November 2007

Thank God You're Here — The Complete Series One, Two & Three
Set details	Special features
31 Episodes; 158 Scenarios; 9 Disc Set; 16:9 Aspect Ratio; Subtitles: English for the hearing impaired; English audio (Dolby Digital 2.0 and 5.1)	As per Series One release.
Release dates
Region 4
28 November 2007

Thank God You're Here — The Complete Series Four
Set details	Special features
10 Episodes; 51 Scenarios; 3 Disc Set; 16:9 Aspect Ratio; Subtitles: English for the hearing impaired; English audio (Dolby Digital 2.0 and 5.1)	Uncut, extended scenarios from during the week.
Release dates
Region 4
5 November 2009

=== Streaming ===
All series were released on Network 10's catch-up service 10Play in June and July 2020.

== Board game ==
In early December 2009, the "Thank God You're Here" board game was released. It contains 70 different scenarios which can be acted out in the home, in a similar format to the show. The board game is being distributed in selected stores only, including What's New.

== International versions ==
The format has been sold to Fremantle for worldwide distribution and has subsequently been sold for creation in 18 countries including the United States. International versions are required to use the same sketch premises used on the original Australian version and if one wants to alter one of their episodes in some way, such as taping a Christmas-themed episode, they must go through Fremantle for permission to do so.

Country	Name	Host	Channel	Language	Premiere	Judge
Australia (original version)	Thank God You're Here	Shane Bourne (2006–2009); Celia Pacquola (2023–)	Network 10	English	5 April 2006; 2 August 2023 (second revival)	Tom Gleisner (2006–2009)
Australia (original version)	Thank God You're Here	Shane Bourne (2006–2009); Celia Pacquola (2023–)	Seven Network	English	29 April 2009 (first revival)	Tom Gleisner (2006–2009)
Armenia	3 պատ (3 Walls)	Garik Papoyan, Felix Khachatryan	Armenia TV	Armenian	2009–2010	
Azerbaijan	Haradasan bu vaxtacan? (Where Are You at This Time?)	Turane Huseynli	İctimai Television	Azerbaijani	6 October 2019	Orkhan Fikretoglu (2019-2020); Vado Korovin (2021-2022)
Belgium	GodzijDank (Thank God)	Matthias Coppens	vtm	Dutch	16 March 2007	
Canada; Quebec	Dieu merci! (Thank God!)	Éric Salvail	TVA	French	27 September 2007	Gaston Lepage
China	谢天谢地你来啦 (Thank God You're Here)	Cui Yongyuan	CCTV-1	Chinese	October 2011	
Czech Republic	Konečně jsi tady (Finally You Are Here)	Josef Carda	TV Prima	Czech	4 March 2007	
Denmark	Gu' ske lov du kom (Thank God You Come)	Mads Vangsø	TV3	Danish	30 September 2006	Sebastian Dorset, Hella Joof; Søs Egelind, Sidse Babett Knudsen (Series 3)
Estonia	Jumal tänatud, et sa siin oled! (Thank God You're Here!)	Andrus Vaarik	Kanal 2	Estonian	6 October 2007	Eino Baskin
France	Enfin te Voilà ! (Finally You're Here!)	Ariane Massenet	Comédie+	French	2013	
Germany	Gott sei dank ... dass Sie da sind! (Thank God... That You Are Here!)	Knacki Deuser	ProSieben	German	30 November 2006	
Indonesia	Akhirnya Datang Juga (Finally You Come)	Winky Wiryawan; Narji; Olga Syahputra	Trans TV	Indonesian	21 October 2007	Didi Petet; Parto Patrio; Desy Ratnasari
Indonesia	Akhirnya Datang Juga (Finally You Come)	Boy William; Indra Bekti	MNCTV	Indonesian	21 May 2011	Desy Ratnasari; Jaja Miharja; Jojon
Indonesia	Akhirnya Datang Juga (Finally You Come)	Winky Wiryawan	GTV	Indonesian	26 February 2024	Abdel Achrian; Denny Chandra
Indonesia	Ini Dia! (Here It Is!)	Kevin Julio; Surya Insomnia	NET.	Indonesian	10 December 2016	Denny Chandra; Dwi Sasono; Ferry Salim; Arie Untung
Israel	Tov Shebata (Thank God)	Moni Moshonov	Arutz 10	Hebrew	5 June 2007	Tomer Sharon
Italy	Grazie Al Cielo Sei Qui! (Thank God You're Here!)	Leonardo Manera	La7	Italian	22 March 2009	
Lithuania	Ačiū Dievui, atėjai (Thank God You Came)	Egidijus Sipavičius	TV3	Lithuanian	1 September 2007	Arkadijus Vinokuras
Mongolia	Бурхны авралаар чи ирлээ (Thank God You're Here!)	Turbat Barhuu	Edutainment TV	Mongolian	3 May 2020	P.Erdenezaan, Ch.Delgertsetseg
Netherlands	Gelukkig Je Bent Er (Thank God You're Here!)	Carlo Boszhard	RTL 4	Dutch	September 2006	
Portugal	Ainda Bem Que Apareceste (I'm Glad You Came)	Virgílio Castelo	RTP1	Portuguese	October 2008	Nilton
Russia	Слава Богу, ты пришёл! (Thank God You Came)	Mikhail Shats, Igor Vernik (2018)	STS	Russian	24 September 2006	Andrey Urgant, Sergei Svetlakov (2018)
Spain	Por Fin Has Llegado (You've Finally Arrived)	Josema Yuste	TVE1	Spanish	14 September 2007	David Fernandez
Sweden	Tack Gode Gud (Thank God)	David Hellenius	TV4	Swedish	21 March 2007	
Turkey	Bak Hele Bak (Look At It)	Emre Altuğ	TRT 1	Turkish	13 January 2015	Rasim Öztekin
United Kingdom	Thank God You're Here	Paul Merton	ITV 1	English	12 January 2008	
United States	Thank God You're Here	David Alan Grier	NBC	English	9 April 2007	Dave Foley
Vietnam	Ơn giời cậu đây rồi! (Thank Goodness You're Here)	Xuân Bắc (2014-2020); Trấn Thành (2014-2020, some episodes); Trường Giang (2018, some episodes); Đại Nghĩa (2022)	VTV3	Vietnamese	11 October 2014	Hoài Linh (2014 - 2018); None (2019 - 2022)

- The original Australian version entered repeat broadcast on 13 January 2015 on Foxtel's Comedy Channel.
- The Czech version of the show, "Konečně jsi tady" was first aired on TV Prima on 4 March 2007. The show was later put on hold to change it to better suit the Czech viewers.
- The Dutch version, "Gelukkig Je Bent Er" broadcast its first episode on RTL 4 in late September 2006, followed by "Gu' ske lov du kom" on Danish TV3 a few days later.
- The German version, "Gott sei Dank... dass Sie da sind!", piloted in July 2006, premiered on 30 November 2006, in primetime on German channel ProSieben, produced by local Fremantle daughter Grundy LE, but managed only to attract a small audience. It was cancelled after 6 episodes.
- The Russian version of the show, "Slava Bogu, ty prishyol" was first aired on STS channel on 24 September 2006. Five seasons with the last shown in 2010 spring have been produced. The premiere of the updated show was held 26 October 2018 at 22:00
- The Swedish version, "Tack gode Gud" was first aired on TV4 on 21 March 2007. It follows the same format as the Australian version and regularly uses similar scenarios.
- The American version was picked up by NBC after a pilot was shot on 9 November 2006, overseen by Rob Sitch, who flew to Los Angeles. It was hosted by American actor and comedian David Alan Grier and judged by Canadian actor and comedian Dave Foley. The program premiered on 9 April 2007 with two back-to-back episodes (including the pilot). It followed the Australian format closely, with the additional quirks of the guests swearing they had not seen the sets or costumes at the start of the show, and host Grier appearing in a cameo for one scenario each episode. Though it managed to attract some fairly high-profile guests, including Tom Green, Fran Drescher and Wayne Knight (who appeared twice), NBC announced it had cancelled the show after just seven episodes on 14 May 2007.
- The British version premiered on 12 January 2008 on ITV. The show was made by Talkback Thames, a FremantleMedia company. Paul Merton was both the host and also featured in his scenes. Hamish Blake appeared on the first two episodes.
- The Vietnamese version from season 6 does not have a true judge – the host also takes charge of pressing the buzzer to end the scene. Instead, audiences in the studio are the ones who make the decisions by voting for contestants after each of the scenes has finished. In addition, during the first 7 seasons, Trấn Thành or Trường Giang may work as the substitute host in case Xuân Bắc is unavailable due to scheduling congestions.

== See also ==
- Very Important People - An American show on the streaming channel Dropout, in which comedians are dressed in character and improvise their way through a fake interview.
