= Rebel Wilson =

Australian actress (born 1980)

- Wilson in 2026
- Born: Melanie Elizabeth Bownds; 2 March 1980 (age 46); Sydney, New South Wales, Australia
- Education: University of New South Wales; Australian Theatre for Young People
- Occupations: Actress; comedian; producer
- Years active: 2002–present
- Spouse: Ramona Agruma (m. 2024)
- Children: 2

Rebel Melanie Elizabeth Wilson (born Melanie Elizabeth Bownds, 2 March 1980) (Note: According to the Australian Electoral Roll, she was born Melanie Elizabeth Bownds. In later years she adopted "Rebel"–a childhood nickname–as her first name and changed her surname to Wilson. She retained her first two given names as middle names.) is an Australian actress, comedian and producer. After graduating from the Australian Theatre for Young People in 2003, Wilson began appearing in the SBS comedy series Pizza (2003–2007) and later appeared in the sketch comedy show The Wedge (2006–2007). She wrote, produced and starred in the musical comedy series Bogan Pride (2008). Shortly after moving to the United States, Wilson appeared in the comedy films Bridesmaids and A Few Best Men, both in 2011.

In 2012, Wilson appeared in the comedy films What to Expect When You're Expecting, Struck by Lightning, and Bachelorette. Wilson wrote and starred in Super Fun Night (2013), a television sitcom that aired for one season on ABC. She gained wider recognition for her role in the musical comedy Pitch Perfect film series (2012–2017).

In 2019, Wilson had her first lead roles in the comedies Isn't It Romantic and The Hustle, and also had a supporting role in the comedy drama Jojo Rabbit. In 2022, she starred in the Netflix comedy film Senior Year, also serving as a producer.

== Early life and education ==
Rebel Melanie Elizabeth Wilson was born on 2 March 1980 in Sydney, New South Wales, Australia. Her parents are professional dog handlers, dog show judges and breeders. (Note: Attributed to multiple references:) Wilson grew up in the suburbs of Kenthurst, Parramatta and Castle Hill. She attended the independent Tara Anglican School for Girls as a boarder. (Note: Attributed to multiple references:) She completed her Higher School Certificate in 1997, achieving a ranking of 99.3, including second place in the state in Food Technology. Wilson joined the debating team and a teacher encouraged her to enter Tournament of Minds, which she credits for helping her come out of her shell. Wilson worked at a cinema in Castle Hill in her younger years, but quit after patrons recognised her after the showing of her first movie, Fat Pizza.

Wilson is the eldest of four children, with sisters Liberty and Annaleise (who uses the name "Annachi") and a brother, who uses the name "Ryot". (Note: Attributed to multiple references:) Liberty and Ryot appeared on the first season of The Amazing Race Australia in 2011, where they were the first team eliminated. Wilson has stated that, according to her grandmother, her great-aunt was Lillian Disney, who was married to Walt Disney until his death in 1966. Wilson stood by this belief in court, despite there being no evidence to support the claim; it continues to be disputed by genealogist Dale Sheridan.

Wilson's first career choice was mathematics. She told The Sydney Morning Herald, "I was very academic at high school and was always good with numbers." She attended the University of New South Wales, graduating in 2009 with Bachelor of Arts (Theatre and Performance Studies) and Bachelor of Laws degrees. She planned to be a lawyer, but decided against corporate life and went to the United States to act. A former Rotary International youth ambassador for Australia, she was based in South Africa for one year, where she contracted malaria. She has spoken of malaria-induced hallucinations, where she saw herself as an actress who had won an Oscar, convincing her to pursue an acting career.

== Career ==
=== 2002–2010: early work ===
Wilson studied at the Australian Theatre for Young People (ATYP). In 2003, she moved to New York after winning the ATYP International scholarship, which was funded by Nicole Kidman. While in New York, Wilson trained with The Second City. She appeared with the Sydney Theatre Company and performed at the Melbourne International Comedy Festival. She first came to the public's attention in 2002 with her stage musical The Westie Monologues, which she wrote, starred in and produced in Sydney. Her follow-up stage productions, which she wrote, produced and starred in include Spunks and Confessions of an Exchange Student.

In Australia, Wilson is also known for her roles as Toula on the SBS comedy series Pizza and as various characters including Lucy, Fat Mandi and Karla Bangs on the sketch comedy series The Wedge. She played an Australian Idol mad schoolgirl in a series of Telstra advertisements shown during Australian Idol from 2004 to 2005. She also had roles in the feature films Fat Pizza (2003) and Ghost Rider (2007).

In 2008, Wilson created, wrote, produced and starred in the musical comedy series Bogan Pride on SBS One and also starred in the improvisational Nine Network series Monster House. In 2009 Wilson won the Tropfest Best Actress award for her role in the film Bargain. She has made appearances on the improvisational comedy show Thank God You're Here and the comedy game show Talkin' 'Bout Your Generation. She performed stand-up on the television special The Breast Darn Show In Town and guest starred in the Seven Network drama City Homicide and performed improv at the Upright Citizens Brigade in Los Angeles.

=== 2010–present: transition to Hollywood ===
Not content with her small role in Ghost Rider, Wilson moved to the United States in January 2010 and signed to talent and literary agents William Morris Endeavor. Wilson's next film role came in the Judd Apatow film, Bridesmaids, in which she played Brynn, the sister of Matt Lucas' character. The role was written especially for her. Wilson then appeared in the CBS sitcom Rules of Engagement and on the Comedy Central series, Workaholics.

She co-hosted the 2010 ARIA Music Awards and performed at the inaugural Variety's Power of Comedy event in Los Angeles with Lucas and Russell Brand. In early 2011, Wilson filmed A Few Best Men at Fox Studios Australia. She also filmed a role in Small Apartments. Wilson was named one of Variety magazine's "Top Ten Comics to Watch for 2011". In 2012, Wilson had a role in the ensemble comedy What to Expect When You're Expecting, as Janice, and co-starred in the indie film Struck By Lightning.

In August 2011, Borys Kit of The Hollywood Reporter reported that Wilson had replaced Casey Wilson in Bachelorette. In 2012, Wilson voiced a character in Ice Age: Continental Drift and played Fat Amy in Pitch Perfect. For the latter role, she received critical acclaim and earned various award nominations, including Best Supporting Actress from the San Diego Film Critics Society and Best Actress in a Comedy from the Broadcast Film Critics Association. She won the MTV Movie Award for Best Actor in a Movie and shared the Best Musical Moment award with her Pitch Perfect co-stars. Wilson was also nominated for MTV Movie Award for Best Performance. Wilson later won the Choice Movie Actress: Comedy award for Pitch Perfect at the 2013 Teen Choice Awards. She had also been nominated for Choice Comedian at the 2013 Teen Choice Awards.

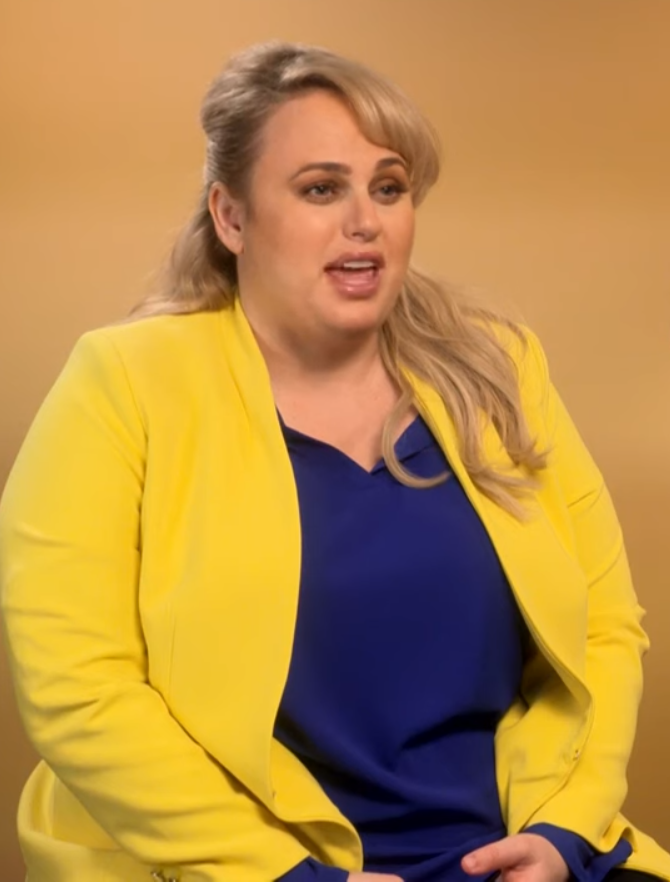
Wilson in 2019

In January 2012, Michael Ausiello of TVLine announced that Wilson would be writing and starring in Super Fun Night, a comedy that follows three friends on a quest to have fun every Friday night. The pilot was picked up by CBS and Conan O'Brien became one of the executive producers. The pilot was later turned down by CBS, but the ABC network picked up the project. A series was ordered and the show began broadcasting in October 2013. The series was cancelled after one season. Wilson played Robin Peck in Michael Bay's Pain & Gain (2013). She hosted the 2013 MTV Movie Awards on 14 April 2013.

In March 2014, the American satellite television network Dish Network launched a marketing campaign for its Hopper DVR featuring Wilson as the voice of the eponymous animated kangaroo. Wilson reprised her role in the sequels Pitch Perfect 2 (2015) and Pitch Perfect 3 (2017). She also made a cameo in the television comedy Pompidou. Wilson joined the voice cast for Kung Fu Panda 3; however, in September 2015, she was replaced with Kate Hudson.

Wilson next appeared in the ensemble comedy How to Be Single, released in February 2016. Nigel M. Smith of The Guardian wrote, "Wilson is the standout, nailing every pratfall she's dealt, but How to Be Single doesn't make strong use of her character." Wilson also appeared in the action comedy Grimsby. On 14 February 2016, Wilson presented the nominations for the Best Supporting Actor category at the 69th British Academy Film Awards. Wilson is one of sixty celebrities who make a cameo in Absolutely Fabulous: The Movie.

Wilson appeared as Ursula, the sea witch, in an all-star concert version of The Little Mermaid at the Hollywood Bowl on 3 June 4 June, and 6 June 2016. She made her West End debut in the musical Guys and Dolls in the role of Miss Adelaide from 28 June to 21 August 2016. She received positive reviews. In 2018, it was announced that Wilson was to produce and star in a feature film adaptation of the Image Comics comic book Crowded. Wilson played LeFou in a production of Beauty and the Beast: Live in Concert at the Hollywood Bowl on 25–26 May 2018. She also appeared on the cover of Vogue Australia for the first time.

Wilson starred in two 2019 comedies. The first, Isn't It Romantic, was released in February, and is about a woman (Wilson) who wakes up in a literal romantic comedy, despite the character's hate for the genre; the film is Wilson's first solo lead role and her first ever producer credit. In May, Wilson starred alongside Anne Hathaway in The Hustle, a female-centred remake of the 1988 comedy film Dirty Rotten Scoundrels. Wilson also co-produced the latter film. Wilson plays twins Doreen and Dolores Bognor in Australian drama series Les Norton. Towards the end of 2019, Wilson played Fraulein Rahm in Taika Waititi's dark comedy drama Jojo Rabbit, and Jennyanydots in the musical film Cats.

Wilson hosted the dog styling competition Pooch Perfect for Seven Network. The show features professional dog stylists competing over a number of challenges for a $100,000 prize. She also hosted the ABC's version of Pooch Perfect in the United States, which was cancelled after one season. Wilson stars in the Netflix comedy film Senior Year, released in May 2022. She plays a woman who, after waking from a 20-year coma, returns to high school to earn the prom queen crown she feels she deserves.

In September 2022, Wilson appeared in her first non-comedy film role in The Almond and the Seahorse, which is an adaptation of Kaite O'Reilly's stage play of the same name. Wilson made her directorial debut with 'The Deb, a musical comedy film set in the Australian outback. It is based on Hannah Reilly's 2022 theatre production, which sees "lovable farm girl and high school outcast" Taylah, who hopes the upcoming Debutante Ball will help change how her peers see her, but her plans are disrupted by the arrival of her cousin Maeve from the city. Production began in September 2023.

In September 2025, Wilson appeared in the Bi-ray music video "Butterfly (Narrative Version)" directed by Japanese rock star Yoshiki.

== Personal life ==
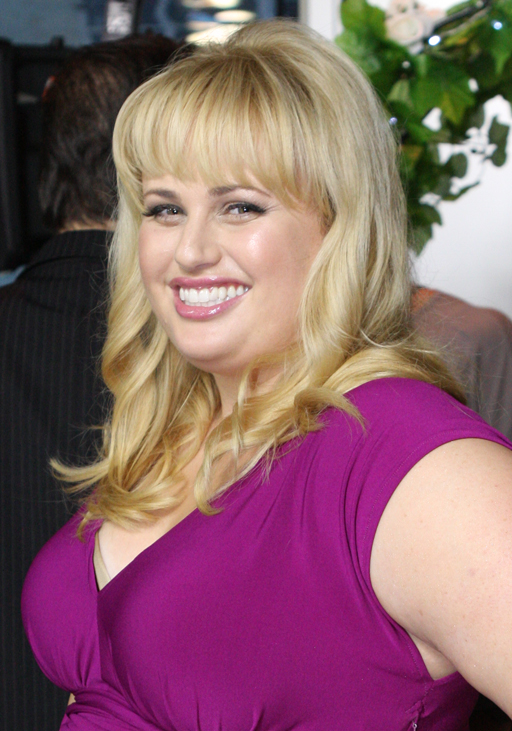
Wilson in 2012

In 2013, Wilson created a plus-size T-shirt collection named after her "Fat Mandi" character in The Wedge featuring images of donuts and cupcakes. In 2017, Wilson launched a plus-sized clothing range called Rebel Wilson x Angels on the heels of a collaboration with Torrid.

Wilson and her Bridesmaids co-star, English actor Matt Lucas, lived together in West Hollywood, from September 2012 until 2015.

In July 2015, Wilson stated her support for stricter American gun laws following the 2015 Lafayette shooting, stating, "I don't like getting political but America you really have to follow Australia's example in gun laws. I don't remember a mass shooting in Australia since they overhauled the gun laws. It seems like every week in America there's a shooting. I just want people to be safe, especially people that are doing one of my favorite things in the world—going out to the movies to have fun."

In 2014, Wilson paid $3.75 million for her Sydney harbourside home. The 1900s freestanding Victorian house underwent $900,000 of renovations. Wilson also settled on a Balmain investment apartment, a conversion of a historic mansion. The New York-inspired terrace home took three years to complete. Wilson paid $1.88 million off the plan in 2015 for the two-bedroom apartment.

Wilson is a fan of the Los Angeles Rams of the National Football League.

As her 40th birthday approached, Wilson made the decision to freeze her eggs, which spurred on her effort to make healthy life changes. She has polyendocrine metabolic ovarian syndrome, and suffers from emotional eating due to pressures of fame. In November 2022, she announced on Instagram the birth of her first child, a daughter born via surrogacy.

Wilson publicly came out as being in a same-sex relationship on Instagram in June 2022, revealing her relationship with Ramona Agruma while posting on Instagram, "I thought I was searching for a Disney Prince… but maybe what I really needed all this time was a Disney Princess." She chose to announce her relationship with Agruma to pre-empt an article by Andrew Hornery of The Sydney Morning Herald that would have outed her. While Herald editor Bevan Shields initially defended Hornery in the face of widespread backlash, denying they were outing her, Hornery later admitted to having made mistakes, and the original article was deleted. In a tweet on 19 February 2023, Wilson confirmed her engagement to Agruma. The couple married in Italy on 28 September 2024 and again in Australia on 29 December 2024. In December 2025, the couple announced that they are expecting another daughter. The birth of the couple's second child was announced on Wilson's Instagram account on 4 May 2026.

=== Weight ===
An advocate for body positivity, Wilson has been a role model for larger women. "There's a lot of pressure on women, especially younger women, to conform to the thin body image," she told the Associated Press. "Not everyone can be that way and no one should be ashamed of how they look or suffer bullying and other forms of abuse because of their size and shape."

Throughout her career, Wilson has been known for her plus-sized figure and would often play to it in her acting work with characters such as "Fat Amy," a character in the movie Pitch Perfect. In a 2013 interview with Hunger Magazine, Wilson stated: "As long as I look like this, I'm going to make fat jokes. All comedians have to use their physicality, so I use my size." Wilson said that her agency signed her almost on the spot because they had nobody on their books like her.

Wilson felt lucky to have her body type and stated that people in the industry would tell her not to lose weight. "For me, I think it's about being comfortable in your own skin. I never want to be too unhealthy, because that's bad. You just want to be comfortable with who you are at whatever size", she said. In 2016, Wilson said that she felt bigger girls did better in comedy because they are easier to laugh at and used that to her advantage.

In July 2011, Wilson became a spokesperson for weight loss and nutrition company Jenny Craig in Australia. In January 2012, Wilson told The Daily Telegraph that she had lost 10 kilograms (22 lb) since signing up to the program. In February 2013, she confirmed that she had ended her agreement with Jenny Craig the previous year.

Wilson asserted that the producers of Pitch Perfect had refused to let her lose any more weight during filming, as her contract stated that she must stay the same size. She said that once her film commitments were over, she would start her diet again to reach her target weight of 80 kilograms (180 lb).

In her 2020 "year of health", Wilson made it her mission to lose 60 pounds (27 kg) and did so by November 2020. Wilson stated that she has always been confident in how she looked, but now feels "super confident".

=== Public profile ===
==== Disputed biography ====
In May 2015, Australian magazine Woman's Day published a story claiming that Wilson had been misleading about her birth name, age, and upbringing. Wilson had previously said in interviews that she was raised by dog-training "bogan" parents in the ghetto of Sydney, spent a year in Zimbabwe, climbed into a cage with a leopard, and got caught in a shoot-out and then struck down by a severe strain of malaria from a mosquito in Mozambique where, from her intensive care bed, she envisioned herself winning an Oscar and rapping her acceptance speech.

Her age was also incorrectly given as 29, when it was actually 35, which she later admitted was something she chose not to correct. Woman's Day called all of this into question and claimed that Wilson had, on the contrary, a "very normal, upper-middle-class upbringing" and "added a touch of 'fantasy' to the life she led before becoming a household name". The story was picked up by several other publications including The Sydney Morning Herald, People magazine, the Chicago Tribune and The Huffington Post.

Most notably, Wilson's true birth date was confirmed through business records filed with the Australian Securities & Investments Commission, which were obtained by The Sydney Morning Herald, and her birth name of Melanie was confirmed. Following the appeal, Wilson continued to stand by her claim that she is related to Walt Disney by marriage, despite having no evidence to support this. Following this incident, Wilson was "sacked from two DreamWorks animations" and "missed out on movie roles during 2015 and 2016".

==== Memoir ====
Wilson's memoir, Rebel Rising, was published in April 2024. It garnered attention for her recounting of discomfort on the set of Grimsby, including Sacha Baron Cohen's alleged requests for nudity and inappropriate behavior during a sex scene, which she refused. Baron Cohen has denied these claims through a spokesperson. Following this episode, publication was pushed back and significant portions of the chapter associated with this incident were redacted for the UK due to legislation regarding factual accuracy and libel.

==== Lawsuits ====
On 16 May 2016, Wilson said print and online articles in Woman's Day, the Australian Women's Weekly, NW and OK! magazines made her out to be a serial liar. According to a defamation writ filed in the Supreme Court of Victoria, Wilson said her reputation and credit had suffered and she had been humiliated and embarrassed. She also sued for special damages, claiming she missed out on roles and others were terminated because of the articles. Wilson was represented by Matthew Collins QC. On 15 June 2017, a six-person jury ruled in Wilson's favour, finding that publisher Bauer Media Group had indeed wrongly painted the actress as a serial liar, and that publishing the articles was likely to have caused harm to her career.

On 13 September 2017, Wilson was awarded approximately A$4,500,000 in damages; sources conflict on the exact amount. Wilson's lawyer Richard Leder said: "Today's verdict is a significant record—it's about four times the highest previous verdict in a defamation case in Australia." In June 2017, Wilson tweeted: "Any dollars I receive will go to charity, scholarships or invested into the Aussie film industry to provide jobs."

Bauer Media appealed the amount of the damages. On 14 June 2018, Bauer Media won its appeal; the damages were reduced to $600,000, and Wilson was ordered to repay more than A$4,000,000 of the initial settlement. She also had to cover 80% of what Bauer spent on its appeal. Wilson announced her intention to appeal against the decision, and lodged an appeal with the High Court on 11 July 2018. The High Court refused the application on 16 November 2018.

Wilson was subject to a defamation suit at the Federal Court of Australia in Sydney in April 2026, lodged by Charlotte MacInnes, an actor who appeared in Wilson's film The Deb. In Instagram posts in 2024 and 2025, Wilson alleged that the actor had accused a producer of harassment but then withdrawn the accusation in exchange for career benefits. The case was dismissed with Australia Federal Court Justice Elisabeth Raper ordering that Wilson's costs be repaid by MacInnes.

Wilson was involved in a 2024 legal dispute with The Deb producer Amanda Guest after Wilson publicly accused Ghost and other producers of financial misconduct and inappropriate conduct during production. Guest sued Wilson for defamation and Wilson countersued for embezzlement, breach of contract, and sexual misconduct. In August 2026, court filings submitted by Ghost’s attorneys included text messages and emails that showed Wilson had authorized and paid for anonymous websites attacking Ghost’s reputation.

== Filmography ==
=== Film ===
Year	Title	Role	Notes
2003	Fat Pizza	Toula	
2007	Ghost Rider	Girl in Alley	
2009	Bargain!	Linda	Short film
2011	Bridesmaids	Brynn	
2011	A Few Best Men	Daphne Ramme	
2012	Bachelorette	Becky Archer	
2012	Small Apartments	Rocky	
2012	Struck by Lightning	Malerie Baggs	
2012	What to Expect When You're Expecting	Janice	
2012	Ice Age: Continental Drift	Raz	Voice
2012	Pitch Perfect	Fat Amy	
2013	Pain & Gain	Robin Peck	
2014	Night at the Museum: Secret of the Tomb	Tilly	
2015	Pitch Perfect 2	Fat Amy	
2015	Panda Paws	Mei Mei	Voice; lines overdubbed by Kate Hudson
2016	Kung Fu Panda 3	Mei Mei	Voice; lines overdubbed by Kate Hudson
2016	How to Be Single	Robin	
2016	Grimsby	Dawn Grobham	
2016	Absolutely Fabulous: The Movie	Flight Attendant	Cameo
2017	Pitch Perfect 3	Fat Amy	
2019	Isn't It Romantic	Natalie	Also producer
2019	The Hustle	Penny Rust	Also producer
2019	Jojo Rabbit	Fraulein Rahm	
2019	Cats	Jennyanydots	
2022	Senior Year	Stephanie Conway	Also producer
2022	The Almond and the Seahorse	Sarah	
2024	The Deb	Janette	Also director, producer, and writer
2024	Jack in Time for Christmas	Herself	British Christmas comedy special
2025	Juliet & Romeo	Lady Capulet	
2025	Bride Hard	Sam	
2025	Tinsel Town	Jill	
2026	Girl Group	Tassie Young	Also director, producer, and writer

=== Television ===
Year	Title	Role	Notes
2003–2007	Pizza	Toula	Recurring cast; Seasons 3–5, Pizza World and Pizza World Record
2006–2007	The Wedge	Various characters	Series regular; 47 episodes
2007–2009	Thank God You're Here	Herself/Various characters	Episodes: "3.04", "3.09", "4.03" & "4.09"
2008	Bogan Pride	Jennie Cragg	Series regular; 6 episodes
2008	Monster House	Penelope Webb	Series regular; 10 episodes
2009	Talkin' 'Bout Your Generation	Generation Y Guest	Episode: "Series 1, Episode 3"
2009	City Homicide	Sarah Gilbert	Episode: "Dead Weight"
2009	The Breast Darn Show in Town	Herself	Comedy gala
2010	Rules of Engagement	Sara	Episode: "Les-bro"
2011	Workaholics	Big Money Hustla	Episode: "Straight Up Juggahos"
2013	Can of Worms	Herself	Episode: "Season 3, Episode 2"
2013	2013 MTV Movie Awards	Host	
2013–2014	Super Fun Night	Kimmie Boubier	Creator, Lead role; 17 episodes
2015	Pompidou	Fancy Dress Contestant	Episode: "Hoarder"
2016	The Big Music Quiz	Herself	Episodes 2 & 8
2016	Travel Man	Herself	Episode: Christmas Special
2019	Les Norton	Doreen Bogner and Dolores Bogner	Series regular
2020	Pooch Perfect	Host	8 episodes
2020	Celebrity IOU	Herself	Episode: "Rebel Wilson's Surprise Outdoor Oasis"
2020	LOL: Last One Laughing Australia	Host	6 episodes
2021	Who Wants to Be a Millionaire?	Herself	Episode: "In The Hot Seat: Rebel Wilson & Amanda Peet"
2024–2025	The Tiny Chef Show	Announcer	10 episodes

=== Video games ===
Year	Title	Role	Notes
2012	Ice Age: Continental Drift – Arctic Games	Raz	Voice

=== Stage credits ===
Year	Title	Role	Notes
2016	The Little Mermaid	Ursula	3–6 June, The Hollywood Bowl
2016	Guys and Dolls	Adelaide	28 June – 21 August, West End
2018	Beauty and the Beast	LeFou	25–26 May, The Hollywood Bowl

== Soundtrack appearances ==
- Pitch Perfect (2012)
- Pitch Perfect 2 (2015)
- Pitch Perfect 3 (2017)
- Isn't It Romantic (2019)
- Cats: Highlights from the Motion Picture Soundtrack (2019)

== Awards and nominations ==
Year	Award	Category	Work	Result
2009	Tropfest	Best Actress	Bargain!	Won
2012	San Diego Film Critics Society	Best Supporting Actress	Pitch Perfect	Nominated
2013	Critics' Choice Awards	Best Actress in a Comedy	Pitch Perfect	Nominated
2013	MTV Movie Awards	Best Breakthrough Performance	Pitch Perfect	Won
2013	MTV Movie Awards	Best Musical Moment	Pitch Perfect	Won
2013	MTV Movie Awards	Best Female Performance	Pitch Perfect	Nominated
2013	Teen Choice Awards	Choice Movie Actress: Comedy	Pitch Perfect	Won
2013	Teen Choice Awards	Choice Movie: Hissy Fit (shared with Anna Camp, Hana Mae Lee and Brittany Snow)	Pitch Perfect	Nominated
2013	Teen Choice Awards	Choice Comedian	—N/a	Nominated
2014	Young Hollywood Awards	Cuz You're Funny	—N/a	Nominated
2017	People's Choice Awards	Favorite Comedic Movie Actress	How to Be Single	Nominated
2019	Teen Choice Awards	Choice Comedy Movie Actress	Isn't It Romantic	Nominated
2020	Screen Actors Guild Awards	Outstanding Performance by a Cast in a Motion Picture	Jojo Rabbit	Nominated
2020	Golden Raspberry Awards	Worst Actress	The Hustle	Nominated
2020	Golden Raspberry Awards	Worst Supporting Actress	Cats	Won
2026	Golden Raspberry Awards	Worst Actress	Bride Hard	Won

- The BBC included her on a list of "100 inspiring and influential women from around the world for 2021".
