= Manny Lewis =

- Directed by: Anthony Mir
- Written by: Carl Barron; Anthony Mir
- Produced by: Martin Fabinyi
- Starring: Carl Barron; Leeanna Walsman; Roy Billing; Damien Garvey
- Production companies: Beyond Screen Production; A-List Entertainment; Seven Network
- Distributed by: StudioCanal
- Release date: 12 March 2015
- Country: Australia
- Language: English

Manny Lewis is a 2015 Australian comedy-drama film starring Carl Barron.

== Cast ==
- Carl Barron as Manny Lewis
- Leeanna Walsman as Maria
- Roy Billing as Lyle
- Damien Garvey
- Simon Westaway as Joel Hillman

== Background ==
Barron said the film was semi-autobiographical:

I wanted to do a story about my life on the road for the past 20 years and show people the other side of stand-up comedy, the side without all the laughter and all the isolation of being a comedian. It is also a bit of a love story and about trying to connect to someone. When you are performing you connect to thousands, but do you ever really connect to one?... Manny Lewis is just a well-known comic who ... has trouble holding down a relationship. Everyone has a trouble trying to connect to people. There is a bit of me in there, how much of me I will leave up to the audience to decide.

== Plot ==
Lewis is a successful stand-up comedian, living alone in a luxury Sydney apartment. Bored and lonely, he begins a series of chaste night-time conversations, as "Thomas", with "Christine" a hostess on a phone sex service and, a few days later, meets Maria, who rents a flat above his favorite coffee shop. They begin hanging out together, somehow failing to recognise each other as "Thomas" and "Christine".

They fall in love, then break up when he resists her suggestion they go swimming together. He confronts his father about brutal treatment he received as a child. He is arrested for brawling; the resultant publicity embarrasses his agent, who is on the verge of arranging an American contract.

In the last scene he reconciles with his father, walks away from the contract, and is reunited with Maria – they dive into the harbour together.

== Reception ==
On Rotten Tomatoes, the film has an aggregated score of 22% based on 2 positive and 7 negative critic reviews.
