= Thank God You're Here (British TV series) =

British television series

- Genre: Improvisational comedy
- Presented by: Paul Merton
- Country of origin: United Kingdom
- Original language: English
- No. of series: 1
- No. of episodes: 6

Production
- Production location: The London Studios
- Running time: 60 minutes (inc. adverts)
- Production company: Talkback Thames

Original release
- Network: ITV
- Release: 12 January – 16 February 2008

Related
- Thank God You're Here

Thank God You're Here is an improvisational comedy game show based on the original Australian show of the same name. In the show, four guests are placed into a scene they have no knowledge about and have to improvise. The series is hosted by Paul Merton, who also acts as judge and performs his own improvised scene.

== Production ==
The UK pilot, made for ITV by Talkback Thames, was announced in mid-2007. The pilot was recorded on 12 November 2007 at The London Studios, with Merton as the show's host (with him also featuring in a one-off improvisational scene of his own). The series started airing on 12 January 2008 on ITV. The show delivered below-average ratings for ITV in its timeslot.

== Episodes ==
Denotes the Winner

=== Pilot ===
The celebrity guests were Clive Anderson, Phil Nichol, Kirsten O'Brien and John Thomson, all of whom also played in a group scene at the end of the show. Backstage interviews with each guest after their scene were conducted by Olivia Lee. However, in the series no such interviews take place.
=== Episode 1: 12 January 2008 ===
Guest star	Scenario	Total viewers	Audience share
Hamish Blake	Car mechanic returning home to be confronted by his multiple wives.	2.9m	12%
Fern Britton	Medium attempting to contact the dead.	2.9m	12%
Ben Miller	Star Trek-like spaceship captain returning to his ship.	2.9m	12%
John Thomson	A Member of Parliament appearing on a chat show discussing his last year in politics.	2.9m	12%
Warm Ups	Jockeys talking at a stewards enquiry / People at a Dating service	2.9m	12%
Paul Merton	A secret agent returning to headquarters after a mission in Geneva.	2.9m	12%
Group scene	Four nuns discussing what they will give up for lent and praying to God.	2.9m	12%
=== Episode 2: 19 January 2008 ===
Clive Anderson	A flight Wing Commander discussing an upcoming bombing mission with his fellow pilots.	2.7m	12%
Hamish Blake	A recently deceased tennis player trying to talk his way into heaven.	2.7m	12%
Sally Lindsay	A shopaholic confronted by her husband about her huge credit card bills.	2.7m	12%
Michael McIntyre	The captain of a cruise liner confronted by angry passengers.	2.7m	12%
Warm Ups	News readers discussing the Stock Market / Being questioned at a police station for speeding	2.7m	12%
Paul Merton	A butler discussing his job performance with his upper-class employees.	2.7m	12%
Group scene	Four fast-food outlet staff members in a team meeting. Clive could not fit through the door, due to a burger costume he was wearing	2.7m	12%
=== Episode 3: 26 January 2008 ===
Marcus Brigstocke	A surgeon examining a seizure patient	1.9m	10%
Lee Mack	A bronze-medalist Olympic athlete visiting a class of schoolchildren	1.9m	10%
Jennie McAlpine	A 19th Century daughter meeting with an upper-class gentleman	1.9m	10%
Phil Nichol	An estranged cowboy returning to the local tavern	1.9m	10%
Warm Ups	A dentist working on a child patient with his mother / An employee having discussion with boss	1.9m	10%
Paul Merton	A clown who had given a bad performance in the circus	1.9m	10%
Group scene	Four criminals planning to steal a priceless painting from a castle	1.9m	10%
=== Episode 4: 2 February 2008 ===
James Corden	A morning radio show host with issues	2.3m	11%
Vernon Kay	A dog whisperer instructing a class of owners	2.3m	11%
Phil Nichol	A scientist on a children's television show	2.3m	11%
Kirsten O'Brien	A girl who threw a party while her parents were away	2.3m	11%
Warm Ups	TV chef being interviewed / Nursery school teacher being questioned by inspector	2.3m	11%
Paul Merton	A golf-playing husband at marriage counseling	2.3m	11%
Group scene	A bobsleigh team debrief	2.3m	11%
=== Episode 5: 9 February 2008 ===
Rufus Hound	A joyrider who has just crashed into someone's living room	1.9m	10%
Lee Mack	Police inspector discussing a serial killer	1.9m	10%
Richard Wilson	A toff on a picnic	1.9m	10%
Claudia Winkleman	A boarding school girl having a chat with her headmistress	1.9m	10%
Warm Ups	Cheese Waiters / Owners of a Nursing Home in a Documentary Interview	1.9m	10%
Paul Merton	Team leader in a snow expedition	1.9m	10%
Group scene	All are obese and discussing their weight gains at a group meeting	1.9m	10%
=== Episode 6: 16 February 2008 ===
Guest star	Scenario		
Marcus Brigstocke	A cricketer speaking at a press conference		
Steve Furst	A student being confronted by angry housemates.		
Rufus Hound	A newly-wed on a honeymoon at a caravan park.		
John Thomson	A Roman general reporting to the Emperor.		
Warm Ups	Negotiating with a suicidal man / Visiting their Dying Grandfather.		
Paul Merton	An upper-class gentleman on board the Titanic.		
Group scene	A super hero meeting.		

== Ensemble Cast ==
- Tara Flynn
- Cicely Giddings
- Nick Haverson
- Rufus Jones
- Richard Katz
- Dan Mersh
- Aimee Parkes
