= Takashi Wakasugi =

Australian comedian

- 若杉 昂志
- Born: July 19, 1989 (age 37); Japan
- Education: Doshisha University
- Occupation: Comedian
- Years active: 2019–present

Takashi "Waka" Wakasugi (born 1989 Japanese: 若杉 昂志, Hepburn: Wakasugi Takashi) is a Japanese comedian who performs in both Australia and Japan.

Wakasugi attended Doshisha University in Japan. During his studies there in 2012, Wakasugi studied abroad at the University of New South Wales in Sydney, Australia, where he first performed stand-up in English. Having previously worked for a time as a backpacking farmworker across Australia, Wakasugi moved to Australia in 2019, where his love of comedy and desire to further practice English resulted in him deciding to pursue stand-up full-time.

In 2021, Wakasugi presented his stand-up show Farm Backpacker (Subclass 417) at the Melbourne International Comedy Festival (MICF). His show Stay Home Stay, about his experience in Perth during the COVID-19 pandemic, premiered in 2022. At the 2023 MICF, Wakasugi won the Director's Choice Award for his show Japanese Worry.

Wakasugi presented Japanese Aussie at the 2024 MICF, and he performed his show Welcome to Japan at the New Zealand International Comedy Festival in 2023 and at Edinburgh Fringe in 2024. In 2025, Wakasugi staged Comedy Samurai in Perth and at the Edinburgh Fringe Festival.

In 2018, Wakasugi was a guest on Tonightly with Tom Ballard, and he was a performer on Thank God You're Here in 2024. Wakasugi also appeared on the fourth season of Taskmaster Australia, broadcast in 2025, where he placed second. He appeared as himself on episodes of The Cheap Seats, Guy Montgomery's Guy Mont-Spelling Bee, and The Cook Up with Adam Liaw in 2025.
