= Thank God You're Here (American TV series) =

2007 American comedy TV series

- Genre: Improvisation comedy
- Created by: Working Dog Productions
- Directed by: Ron de Moraes
- Presented by: David Alan Grier
- Starring: Nyima Funk; Maribeth Monroe; Brian Palermo; Chris Tallman
- Judges: Dave Foley
- Announcer: Joe Cipriano
- Opening theme: "Come Anytime" by Hoodoo Gurus
- Country of origin: United States
- Original language: English
- No. of seasons: 1
- No. of episodes: 7

Production
- Executive producers: Fax Bahr; Cécile Frot-Coutaz; Adam Small
- Producer: David Alan Grier
- Production locations: Los Angeles, California
- Running time: 60 minutes
- Production companies: Working Dog Productions; Bahr–Small Productions; FremantleMedia North America

Original release
- Network: NBC
- Release: April 9 – May 14, 2007

Related
- Original Australian version of Thank God You're Here

Thank God You're Here is a partially improvised comedy television program, based on the Australian TV show, broadcast by NBC. The show was hosted by David Alan Grier and presided over by judge Dave Foley. The pilot was shot on November 9, 2006, and NBC initially ordered six episodes. The show debuted with a two-hour, double-episode premiere on April 9, 2007. It was produced by FremantleMedia North America, with Cécile Frot-Coutaz, CEO of Fremantle, Fax Bahr, and Adam Small as executive producers.

The show aired on Mondays for its first two weeks. It was moved to Wednesdays on April 18, 2007.

On May 14, 2007, after the initial order of 7 episodes aired, the series was cancelled by NBC.

== Summary ==
Thank God You're Here showcased the improvisational skills of a group of four actors each week, as they walked into a live sketch without having seen a script for it. The only clue the actors had as to the content of the sketch, and the role they would be playing within the sketch, was their costume.

Upon entering the sketch, the actors were greeted with "Thank God you're here!" from another actor in the sketch. Outside of the principal actor, all actors in the sketch had a script which they more or less followed, depending on the improvisations. Sketches had no set ending point — instead, they went on until the judge (Foley) stopped them with a buzzer. Also, in each episode one of the skits would feature David Alan Grier in a surprise cameo.

At the end of the show, the judge chose a winner from among the four actor contestants. The winner was awarded a trophy. Unlike the Australian version, no honorable or dishonorable mentions were chosen.

== Cast ==
- David Alan Grier — Host
- Dave Foley — Judge
- Nyima Funk - Ensemble
- Maribeth Monroe – Ensemble
- Brian Palermo – Ensemble
- Chris Tallman – Ensemble

== List of episodes ==
Key: Denotes the winner

=== Episodes 1 & 2: April 9, 2007 ===
Guest star	Scenario
Wayne Knight	Morning TV show guest pushing a supplement to vitamins
Bryan Cranston	A British rock star late for a meeting with an executive
Joel McHale	An Egyptian archaeologist exploring a newly discovered tomb
Jennifer Coolidge	A contestant in "Ms. Constellation" beauty pageant
Warm-ups	Going through customs / A cop on the news
Group scene	A collection of superheroes who must save Las Vegas
David's Cameo	As a judge in Jennifer Coolidge's skit

Guest star	Scenario
Mo'Nique	A TV game show co-host
Kevin Nealon	A famous high-altitude guide/rescuer
Richard Kind	A radio Foley artist
Edie McClurg	A wife at a marriage counselor's office
Warm-ups	Taxi drivers undergoing examination / Apply for a job
Group scene	Knights of the Round Table meet and go in search of Guinevere
David's Cameo	As Edie McClurg's secret lover

=== Episode 3: April 16, 2007 ===
Guest star	Scenario
Jason Alexander	The captain in a Star Trek parody
Brian Posehn	A 1950s jock (geek) meeting his date's father before their date
Jane Lynch	A woman explaining to her parents about a party she held while they were away from home
Harland Williams	An explorer returning to a British museum with his latest find
Warm-ups	Car salesmen to an 18-year-old girl and her father / daycare owners
Group scene	Pirates meet their captain to become the new first mate
David's Cameo	As a guest who overstayed at Jane Lynch's party

=== Episode 4: April 18, 2007 ===
Guest star	Scenario
Chelsea Handler	A newlywed bride giving a toast with the groom
George Takei	A surgeon
Shannon Elizabeth	Advertising executive pitching a new vodka drink
Tom Green	A leery plumber seduced by a married woman
Warm-ups	Unemployment interview / Cook for a new restaurant on a morning show
Group scene	Vikings meeting with chief to decide who the new chief will be
David's Cameo	As a doctor asking George Takei for medical advice

=== Episode 5: May 2, 2007 ===
Guest star	Scenario
Tom Arnold	A chef in an altercation with customers
Angela Kinsey	A celebrity being interviewed on a late night talk show
Fran Drescher	Real estate agent pitching a new design on a beach resort
Fred Willard	A journeyman meeting Robin Hood and his Merry Men
Warm-ups	People in a dating service / Directors of The Godfather: Part IV
Group scene	Obese members of a health center
David's Cameo	As a protester in Fran Drescher's skit

=== Episode 6: May 9, 2007 ===
Guest star	Scenario
Kurtwood Smith	A Captain fielding complaints from passengers on his cruise ship that is about to sink
Ana Gasteyer	A comic book heroine at a fan convention
Paul Rodriguez	A medieval doctor
Nicole Sullivan	A teacher giving a parent/teacher conference
Warm-ups	Drivers pulled over by the cops / Workers getting fired from their job
Group scene	Members of a children's group, called The Wibbly Wobblies, à la The Wiggles, pitching their proposed TV show at an audition. Actors are dressed up as a clown, bobbie, a dinosaur, and a flower.
David's Cameo	As a nerd in Ana Gasteyer's comic book convention

=== Episode 7: May 16, 2007 ===
Guest star	Scenario
Bill Bellamy	Promoting his workout equipment
Wayne Knight	A Roman general reporting to the emperor
Wendie Malick	A bad cheerleader is called to the principal's office; Jerry Springer's appearance occurred here
Eddie Kaye Thomas	An illegal drag racer crashes into an apartment. (this scene and Joel McHale's scene were the only scenes in which the person does not go through the door.)
Warm-ups	Jockeys interviewed after losing a race / Directors of a terrible nursing home
Group scene	Fast food workers getting a pep talk; everyone is in common uniforms except for Wayne Knight, who is dressed as a giant cheeseburger (because of this, Wayne had trouble getting through the door.)
David's Cameo	A passenger in Eddie Kaye Thomas' car

Notes: This episode featured an appearance by Jerry Springer and was originally supposed to feature Alanis Morissette, who ended up pulling out.
