= Carl Barron =

Australian comedian

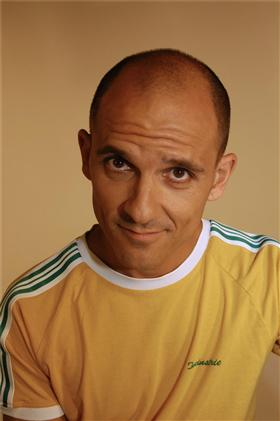
- Carl Barron in 2012
- Born: 11 June 1964 (age 62); Longreach, Queensland, Australia

Comedy career
- Years active: 1993–present
- Genres: Observational humour; word play
- Website: Official website

Carl Barron (born 11 June 1964) is an Australian theatre and television comedian. His style is based on observational humour.

== Life and career ==
He was born in Longreach, Queensland, the son of a sheep shearer, and formerly worked as a grease trap pumper. Barron has released five DVDs, entitled Carl Barron LIVE!, Carl Barron: Whatever Comes Next, Carl Barron: Walking Down The Street, Carl Barron: A One Ended Stick and Carl Barron: Drinking With A Fork. In November 2010 a box set entitled "All The Stuff I've Done So Far" was released, which included the first three previous titles, plus a documentary and outtakes. In 1993 he was voted 'Pumper of the Year' and 'Best Up and Coming Talent' and has since made many TV appearances in commercials and on TV shows such as Rove and Thank God You're Here.

Barron made his first television appearance on the NRL Footy Show on 17 April 1997.

He has regularly sold-out shows at the Melbourne International Comedy Festival. Barron has been very successful in Australia with the DVD release of Carl Barron LIVE! going four times platinum, making it the most successful Australian comedy DVD in Australian history. He has appeared in Good News Week, Out of the Question, Thank God You're Here and several episodes of Rove.

== Film ==
Barron co-wrote and starred in the 2015 Australian film Manny Lewis, playing the title character based on himself.

== Video albums ==
Title	Details	Certification
Carl Barron LIVE!	Released: 2003; Label: Acmec Records	ARIA: 14× Platinum
Carl Barron: Whatever Comes Next	Released: 2005; Label: Acmec Records	ARIA: 2× Platinum
Carl Barron: Walking Down the Street	Released: 2009; Label: Beyond Home Entertainment	ARIA: 7× Platinum
Carl Barron: All The Stuff I've Done So Far	Released: 2010; Label: Beyond Home Entertainment; Note: 3x DVD + My Doco and Unseen Stand-up	ARIA: 4× Platinum
Carl Barron: A One Ended Stick	Released: 2013; Label: Beyond Home Entertainment	ARIA: Platinum
Carl Barron: Wompoo Street	Released: November 2014; Label: Beyond Home Entertainment	
Carl Barron: Drinking With a Fork	Released: November 2018; Label: Universal Sony Pictures Entertainment	
Carl Barron: Skating Rink For Flies	Released: December 2023; Label: Bounty Films	

== Awards and nominations ==
=== ARIA Music Awards ===
The ARIA Music Awards are a set of annual ceremonies presented by Australian Recording Industry Association (ARIA), which recognise excellence, innovation, and achievement across all genres of the music of Australia. They commenced in 1987.

Year	Nominee / work	Award	Result	Ref.
2006	Whatever Comes Next	Best Comedy Release	Nominated	
2019	Drinking with a Fork	Best Comedy Release	Nominated	
