= Alan Brough =

New Zealand actor, television and radio host and comedian

- Born: 1967 (age 58–59); Hāwera, New Zealand
- Occupations: Comedian; television presenter; author; radio host
- Known for: Spicks and Specks

Alan Brough (/broʊ/; born 1967) is a New Zealand actor, television and radio host and comedian based in Australia. He is best known for his role as a team captain on Spicks and Specks, which he has been on consistently since its inception in 2005.

== Early life ==
Brough worked as an actor in Wellington and Auckland, mainly in live theatre. He also appeared in a series of butter commercials as a drag queen called Marge.

== Career ==
In 1993, Brough appeared in the New Zealand sitcom Melody Rules (widely regarded as a poor programme, being described as "cringeworthy"). In 1995, Brough moved to Australia, where he worked on Kath & Kim as well as in films including The Craic, The Nugget and Bad Eggs. He also appeared on a national radio show on Triple M called Tough Love.

In 2008, he was appointed as host of the Sunday morning program on 774 ABC Melbourne and across Victoria, replacing Helen Razer. He remained in the position for three years until 2011. Brough had a supporting role in the 2012 Australian comedy Any Questions for Ben?, created by Working Dog Productions. That year, Brough performed the role of Baron Bomburst in the Australian production of Chitty Chitty Bang Bang.

Brough has also written junior fiction, he released the novel Charlie And The War Against The Grannies in 2016, which was successful enough to warrant a sequel the following year. His work on these novels has been compared to that of Andy Griffiths, and David Walliams.

== Personal life ==
Brough has been with his partner, theatrical agent Helen Townshend, since 1991. They have a daughter, Daisy, born in 2011.
