= The Price We Pay (2022 film) =

- Directed by: Ryuhei Kitamura
- Written by: Christopher Jolley
- Produced by: Andre Relis; Todd Lundbohm; Robert Dean; Bill Kelman
- Starring: Emile Hirsch; Gigi Zumbado; Tyler Sanders; Tanner Zagarino; Amazon Eve; Vernon Wells; Stephen Dorff
- Cinematography: Matthias Schubert
- Edited by: Shohei Kitajima
- Music by: Aldo Shllaku
- Production companies: VMI Worldwide; 828 Media Capital; Buffalo 8
- Distributed by: Lionsgate
- Release dates: August 28, 2022 (FrightFest 2022); January 10, 2023 (VOD)
- Running time: 86 minutes
- Country: United States
- Language: English

The Price We Pay is a 2022 American horror film directed by Ryuhei Kitamura and starring Emile Hirsch, Gigi Zumbado, Tyler Sanders, Tanner Zagarino, Amazon Eve with Vernon Wells and Stephen Dorff. The film follows a gang of robbers (Hirsch, Zagarino and Dorff) and their hostage (Zumbado) who decide to take shelter in a farmhouse after their car breaks down, unaware of the terrifying horrors awaiting them inside. The film was released on video on demand on January 10, 2023, and in select theaters on January 13, 2023.

== Plot ==
After turning a trick, a sex worker is abandoned at a lonely gas station far from town. After she has looked through the wallet that she has stolen from the john, someone shoots her with a tranquilizer dart and abducts her.

Grace is in the middle of negotiating with a pawn shop owner over payments she is unable to make when the pawn shop is robbed by Alex, Cody, and Alex's brother Shane. The owner shoots Shane in the leg and is shot dead himself. The getaway driver hears the gunshots and flees. Alex and Cody get a worker to open the safe, then trigger-happy Alex shoots the worker. Grace, having witnessed these murders, is forced by the three robbers to drive them away, but her car breaks down so robber Cody and Grace pretend to be on their way to visit relatives and convince a young farmhand named Danny to let them wait a few hours in his farmhouse for Cody's supposed brother.

After Cody removes the bullet from Shane's leg, Alex becomes suspicious and investigates what Danny is doing. He discovers a secret dungeon just as Danny's doctor grandfather and the towering Jodi return home. The kidnapped sex worker awakens in the basement and begins to exit but spooks Alex, who shoots her. As he is looking at the body, Jodi captures him. The doctor shoots Cody, Shane and Grace with tranquilizer darts as Danny pleads with them not to hurt Grace because she is not one of them. Alex wakes up on an operating table next to Shane, who is awake and in distress because his organs are exposed. The doctor removes Shane's heart, explaining how his daughter was hurt by evil men like them and explaining that his granddaughter Jodi's beautiful smile was disfigured and is now covered by a bandage. He explains that Alex has ruined their catch for the night by killing her and that Alex's organs have been ruined from drug use but that his eyes are still healthy and valuable on the black market. The doctor then cuts out his eyes.

In another room, Grace begs Danny to help her escape, but Danny merely tells her that her death will not be painful, connecting an IV bag to the cannula in the vein in her arm before leaving. Cody wakes up in the same room and manages to shift his operating table closer to hers to break the IV line going into her arm as Jodi comes in and takes him to the operating room, where Alex's eyes have been removed. The doctor has no further use for Alex and lets Jodi take him to another room to play, where she releases the straps holding him down and hands him a switchblade. He attempts to attack her but she easily overcomes him and slits his throat.

As the doctor cuts open Cody to remove his organs, Danny slides the tray of medical tools closer to Grace so that she can grab a scalpel and cut the straps holding her down. She attacks the doctor, who falls onto and is bitten by Cody. Grace smashes open a canister of compressed gas, which flies into the doctor's head and pushes him into the wall, bursting his head into pieces. Jodi returns but Danny locks her out of the room. Together Danny and Grace staple Cody back shut. Cody tells Danny to help Grace escape and that he will buy them some time, then gets Grace to inject him with adrenaline. Grace and Danny escape into a passageway between the walls as Jodi returns and quickly kills Cody after a brief fight. Jodi reaches through the wall and grabs Grace, who shoots her, causing her to drop her electrified bat. Danny grabs the bat and sticks it in Jodi's stomach, causing her to drop to the floor as they escape up a ladder. When Jodi tries to follow, they pour a dissolving solution from one of the nearby barrels over her. The disfigured Jodi continues to chase them, but is shot with multiple tranquilizer darts by Danny. Enraged, Jodi tries to kill Danny, but Grace wraps barbed wire from the nearby fence around her face and Danny turns on a machine to tighten the wire as she screams, "Brother!" Grace plunges a scythe into Jodi's stomach and the barbed wire tears Jodi's head from her body.

Grace and Danny get into the doctor's truck and Danny asks, "Where do we go from here?" Grace replies, "No idea. Wanna find out?" Then the two survivors drive away from the farmhouse.

== Cast ==
- Emile Hirsch as Alex
- Stephen Dorff as Cody
- Gigi Zumbado as Grace
- Vernon Wells as The Doctor
- Tyler Sanders as Danny
- Tanner Zagarino as Shane
- Amazon Eve as Jodi
- Sabina Mach as Carly
- Jesse Kinser as John
- Heath Hensley as Mr. Fuller
- Nature Trammer as Mckenzi
- Chelsea Hunter as News Broadcaster
- Takaaki Hirakawa as Cashier
- Nick Check as Pawn Shop Worker
- Christopher Robleto-Harvey as Harvey (as Christopher Robleto)
- Eleanor Burke as Carly (voice)

== Production ==
Filming wrapped in Las Cruces, New Mexico in September 2021.

The film is dedicated to the memory of Tyler Sanders (2004-2022).

== Reception ==
Joel Harley of Starburst awarded the film three stars.

Film critic Kim Newman wrote that while the film is "not very good", it "keeps on swinging, offering non-stop eyekicks, excitement and gross-out".
