= DMV (TV series) =

American comedy series (2025–2026)

- Genre: Sitcom; Workplace comedy
- Created by: Dana Klein
- Based on: The short story "Chicken-Flavored and Lemon-Scented" by Katherine Heiny
- Starring: Harriet Dyer; Tony Cavalero; Molly Kearney; Alex Tarrant; Gigi Zumbado; Tim Meadows
- Music by: Gabriel Mann
- Country of origin: United States
- Original language: English
- No. of seasons: 1
- No. of episodes: 20

Production
- Executive producers: Dana Klein; Matt Kuhn; Aaron Kaplan; Robyn Meisinger; Wendi Trilling; Trent O'Donnell
- Producers: Irene Litinsky; Loïc Bernard
- Production locations: Montreal, Canada
- Cinematography: Barry Russell
- Editors: Arthur Tarnowski; Baun Mah; David Di Francesco; Paul Winestock
- Camera setup: Single-camera
- Running time: 21–23 minutes
- Production companies: Liscolaide Productions; OAOA; Anonymous Content; TrillTV; Kapital Entertainment; CBS Studios

Original release
- Network: CBS
- Release: October 13, 2025 – May 11, 2026

DMV is an American workplace comedy television series created by Dana Klein that premiered on CBS on October 13, 2025. In March 2026, the series was canceled after one season. The series finale aired on May 11, 2026.

== Premise ==
The show follows the workers at the East Hollywood DMV. Collette, a driving instructor, tackles workplace problems, romance, and interpersonal connections with her coworkers. The show is a fictional account of the DMV, but makes the jokes that most people have when going to renew licenses and forms.

== Cast and characters ==
=== Main ===
- Harriet Dyer as Colette, a driving examiner at the East Hollywood branch of the California Department of Motor Vehicles (DMV) who has a big heart, but is not great with boundaries. She harbors a crush on Noa.
- Tony Cavalero as Vic, a DMV driving examiner and former bouncer. An avid gym-goer, generally dim-witted, and is a misogynist.
- Molly Kearney as Barbara, the recently promoted California DMV East Hollywood branch manager who is very optimistic and well-intentioned
- Alex Tarrant as Noa, a recently hired DMV employee originally from New Zealand
- Gigi Zumbado as Ceci, a photographer at the DMV. She is selfish, arrogant, and fixes many problems at the DMV.
- Tim Meadows as Gregg, a DMV driving examiner who used to be an English teacher. He often makes jokes about how he cannot stand to go home to his wife.

=== Recurring ===
- Jessica Camacho as Surfer Mary, Noa's laid-back love interest whom he meets during a driving test
- Samantha Helt as Hot Kristen, Colette's attractive co-worker

=== Special guest stars ===
- Mark Feuerstein as Brent, a man who gets upset when he can't use an expired passport to get a Real ID driver's license
- Randall Park as Beau Young, the California DMV North Hollywood branch manager
- Leslie Jones as Sally, the California DMV director's executive assistant in Sacramento "Big Sac"
- Thomas Lennon as Howie
- Zoe Lister-Jones as Dr Jacobs
- Anna Camp as Robin

== Production ==
=== Development ===
On August 5, 2024, DMV was given a pilot order by CBS. The pilot was written by Dana Klein and directed by Trent O'Donnell, and was filmed in Montreal, Canada in November 2024. Klein also executive produced the project alongside O'Donnell, Aaron Kaplan, Wendi Trilling, and Robyn Meisinger. On April 22, 2025, DMV was picked to series by CBS. Production companies involved producing the series are Anonymous Content, CBS Studios, Kapital Entertainment, and TrillTV. The series is based on a short story by Katherine Heiny. Filming for the series began on July 28, 2025, in Montreal. In September 2025, DMV received a full season order of 20 episodes. On March 27, 2026, CBS canceled the series after one season.

=== Casting ===
In September 2024, Tim Meadows, Harriet Dyer, and Molly Kearney were cast to star. On November 1, 2024, Alex Tarrant, Tony Cavalero, and Gigi Zumbado joined the main cast. On October 20, 2025, Jessica Camacho was cast in a recurring capacity.

== Episodes ==
No.	Title	Directed by	Written by	Original release date	U.S. viewers (millions)
1	"Pilot"	Trent O'Donnell	Dana Klein	October 13, 2025	3.93
Colette, a big-hearted driving examiner, begins her day at the East Hollywood DMV branch, where nothing goes according to plan. While balancing the teasing of coworkers Gregg, a grumpy former English teacher; Vic, a former bouncer; and Ceci, who is obsessed with photography and laminating, she manages her crush on her coworker Noa. Barbara, the new branch manager, struggles to keep things under control as consultants stop by to figure out how to cut costs and decide whether this branch or four other local Hollywood branches should be shut down.
2	"Stay In Your Lane"	Trent O'Donnell	Dana Klein & Matt Kuhn	October 20, 2025	3.31
On a hot day in East Hollywood, the DMV staff struggles with a broken air conditioner. Colette worries that Noa might leave next after a new hire quits because of the overwhelmingness and demand, known as "Wash out Wednesday" to the staff. She is determined to keep him around, so she ignores what Gregg and Vic warn and changes the AC herself, which causes a power outage. At the same time, Noa's driving test brings him face-to-face with someone from his past, which makes things more difficult for Colette. Barb is still reporting to "Big Sac" as the decision whether their branch or four other local Hollywood branches should be shut down remains in question.
3	"Easy Pass"	Trent O'Donnell	Ira Ungerleider	October 27, 2025	2.84
When Colette finally gives her coworker, Noa, his driving test, she struggles to stay professional even though she has feelings for him. Meanwhile, Ceci helps Barb get ready for her official portrait as the branch's new manager. As Colette opens up to Noa, she learns he may have used their friendship to get ahead.
4	"Don't Kill the Job"	Trent O'Donnell	Sam Laybourne	November 3, 2025	3.02
When Colette unexpectedly encounters an old friend while working at the DMV, she chooses to act more like a customer than an employee to avoid embarrassment, enlisting the help of her coworkers to carry out her plan. Meanwhile, Gregg take Noa under his wing to teach him the unspoken strategies of navigating the slow-moving rhythms of DMV work.
5	"Stick Shift"	Trent O'Donnell	Keith Heisler	November 10, 2025	2.98
Ceci accuses Colette of performing acts of kindness solely for recognition and credit, prompting Colette to try and prove her sincerity by anonymously giving Noa a carefully chosen gift, which unexpectedly causes disastrous results for him.
6	"Blindspot"	Christine Gernon	Sasha Stroman	November 17, 2025	2.93
Colette is heartbroken to learn that her crush, Noa, is dating someone else, and Ceci encourages her to take action using magic-driven ways. Meanwhile, Barb launches an investigation into who is defacing the DMV's property with inappropriate drawings.
7	"There Is No I in DMV"	Christine Gernon	Joshua Corey & Brian Kratz	November 24, 2025	2.81
e printer at the DMV doesn't work. Barb decides to visit another LA DMV to see how they run and takes Collette, Noa, and Vic. While there, Collette and Vic steal their printer. Barb gets into arguments with the manager of the location. Noa tries to get his license done but keeps getting transferred between windows. In the end, they give the printer back, and realize they only have good wait times because the location transfers people to other windows to keep them at a 3-5 minute completion time.
8	"Splash Fountain"	Katie Locke O'Brien	Miles Woods	December 1, 2025	3.12
Barb tells everyone they got a refund from when the AC broke. Collette becomes texting buddies with Barb and starts to regret it immediately. Vic and Noa bond over being bros. Gregg gets onto a call with the help desk about his forever broken chair and becomes best friends with the AI assistant. Collette and Barb get trapped in a self-driving car for hours. Everyone want a new coffee maker.
9	"The Next Window"	Katie Locke O'Brien	Matt Kuhn	December 8, 2025	3.05
Noa breaks up with Mary. Barb wants to take some of the team to Sacramento to see the DMV director open up their holiday card and put it on the tree.
10	"Hot Gurlz"	Robert Cohen	Nora Nolan	February 23, 2026	2.74
Collette wants more girl friends, so she tries to befriend Ceci and get into the Hot Gurlz group chat. She goes on a date with Ceci's cousin, who is a repairman, but instantly regrets asking him out because he is shorter than her. Ceci adds her to the group chat. On the second date she tries to be obnoxious to blow him off, but he blows her off because she has weird feet. In the end everyone is good and Ceci lets Collette stay on the group chat.
11	"Power Shift"	Robert Cohen	Kristen Zublin	March 2, 2026	2.89
Barb's ankle is healed so she gets her boot off. The DMV will be piloting a new AI license photography robot, which basically replaces Ceci's job. Ceci and Barb decide to swap jobs for the day to make her feel better. Ceci does a great job as a manager, so Barb sabotages her. In the end, they switch back and as they're trying to destroy the robot, it falls and breaks Barb's foot again. WNBA star Renee Montgomery visits the DMV and Vic claims he could beat her in a game. Colette challenges him and sets up a game between the two.
12	"The Fourth Wheel"	Santiago Limón	Ira Ungerleider	March 9, 2026	2.87
Barb hires a new driving instructor, (played by Anna Camp), who is the niece of the President of the DMV. Quickly, she reveals she is trying to take Collette's place. Also, Noa finds out that Ceci is dating the man who made him miserable in previous episodes. He finds that their relationship is horribly toxic, but helps them stay together anyway. Barb ends up firing the new girl and gets a call from the president thanking her for firing his niece. This episode also features people playing poker with expired licenses.
13	"Test Drive"	Rob Cohen	Sasha Stroman	March 16, 2026	2.86
It is Teen Outreach Day, Barb wants good press, so they're getting a bunch of teenagers on their road tests. Collette tries to find out why Gregg left teaching. Barb gets Ceci to star in her promotion video for DMV-TV. Vic and Noa are convinced that one of the teenagers is Vic's son.
14	"Payday"	Robert Cohen	Nora Nolan	March 23, 2026	2.99
Payday at the DMV only happens once a month, so everyone needs a side hustle to get them through the month. Barb doesn't do side hustles but end up falling for an MLM that sells gloves. Vic builds and delivers furniture and ropes Noa into helping him. Gregg discovers Noa is rich and doesn't actually need any side hustle. Barb convinces Collette and Ceci to join in the MLM, and they discover the gloves cause irritation and lesions to their hands. Payday finally occurs and everyone starts blowing their money on things again.
15	"Gilbert"	Santiago Limón	Miles Woods	March 30, 2026	2.74
Collette gives a driving test to Howard (played by Thomas Lennon), who rescues animals. Vic's 12-year old best friend moves away and he is lonely, so Gregg and Collette set him up to get a dog from Howard. Barb's foot is still healing and Ceci blames herself for it breaking, so she tries to repay her debt by getting Noa, the person with the slowest ATP, to be faster. Howard has very thorough tests to see if Vic is capable of owning a dog. Ceci tries to make Noa less hot so he can be faster, in the end she puts Paula at the window next to him to improve his time. After some self-sabotage, Vic passes Howard's tests and adopts his new dog, Gilbert.
16	"Fresh Ink"	Natalia Anderson	Keith Heisler	April 13, 2026	2.78
Barb is the only Hollywood DMV manager who hasn't been featured in the 10&2 magazine. Gregg and Vic start a competition to get more positive reviews online, with the loser having to get a tattoo of Barb. Collette gets a teen reporter to interview Barb.
17	"Drive-ory Tower"	Natalia Anderson	Ananya Menon	April 20, 2026	2.71
Vic is in a battle with a crow in the parking lot, which ends up slicing his ear. Collette learns that people working at the counters call her position DEBs (Driving Examiner Babies). To prove she's not a Deb, Collette works at the counters for a day and fails miserably. Barb convinces a customer (played by Zoe Lister-Jones), who's a doctor, to do a driving test with Vic and examine his ear. The crow keeps winning against Vic.
18	"Abuela"	Natalia Anderson	Sam Laybourne	April 27, 2026	N/A
The office does a group exercise of trying to get from a sitting position to standing without using their hands, and Gregg gets stuck on the floor for hours. Vic brings his dog, Gilbert, to work and Barb doesn’t get along with the dog. Ceci’s abuela needs to take a driving test and goes with Collette on the test to purposely make her fail. Noa tries to help Gregg off the floor. Beau Young, from the NoHo DMV, comes to psych out Barb before her dinner with the consultants.
19	"Car-lette"	Natalia Anderson	Joshua Corey & Brian Kratz	May 4, 2026	N/A
Colette needs repairs to her car for it to get registered again but she doesn’t have $3000. Barb tries to tell everyone what to do if a robbery occurs, when no one listens she decides to stage a robbery as the robber. Vic runs away and is no longer seen as the tough guy, so he gets Noa to fake-rob the DMV again but Barb stops him before Vic can prove he’s tough. Gregg exchanges Colette’s car for another after hers falls apart and they have a touching moment saying goodbye to the car.
20	"Impact Will Be Felt"	Natalia Anderson	Dana Klein & Matt Kuhn	May 11, 2026	N/A
The consultants choose in two days. Noa passes his driver’s test and they throw a party after work and Collette finally kisses Noa. People prepare for the worst and fix-up their résumés and we learn Vic never finished high school. Colette realizes there’s no chemistry with Noa after the bad kiss and Ceci helps her see how much she’s grown since starting to work at the DMV. Barb finds out Ray Henderson is embezzling money from the pensions. The consultants accidentally hit Barb with their car and decide to keep the branch open and shut down the North Hollywood branch. Ray gets fired and the new head of the DMV is Beau Young.

== Broadcast ==
DMV premiered on CBS on October 13, 2025. The series finale aired on May 11, 2026.

The series was acquired by ITV in the United Kingdom – subtitled DMV: Department of Motor Vehicles – with the first ten episodes available on its streaming platform ITVX from April 16, 2026, and the remaining ten added by early June; the series was broadcast on ITV1, with the first episode receiving a primetime broadcast that night, and the remaining episodes shown inconsistently in the following weeks in an overnight slot.

== Reception ==
=== Critical response ===
On the review aggregator website Rotten Tomatoes, the series holds an approval rating of 65% based on 17 reviews. The website's critics consensus reads, "While DMV still has some kinks to work out before it passes inspection, it's already a lot more fun than visiting the genuine article." Metacritic, which uses a weighted average, gave a score of 53 out of 100 based on 11 critics, indicating "mixed or average".

=== Ratings ===
Viewership and ratings per episode of DMV
No.	Title	Air date	Rating/share (18–49)	Viewers (millions)	DVR (18–49)	DVR viewers (millions)	Total (18–49)	Total viewers (millions)	Ref.
1	"Pilot"	October 13, 2025	0.3/3	3.93	0.1	1.15	0.4	5.08	
2	"Stay In Your Lane"	October 20, 2025	0.3/3	3.31	0.1	0.77	0.4	4.27	
3	"Easy Pass"	October 27, 2025	0.2/2	2.84	0.1	0.84	0.4	3.68	
4	"Don't Kill the Job"	November 3, 2025	0.3/3	3.02	0.1	0.74	0.4	3.76	
5	"Stick Shift"	November 10, 2025	0.2/3	2.98	0.1	0.75	0.3	3.73	
6	"Blindspot"	November 17, 2025	0.2/3	2.93	—N/a	—N/a	—N/a	—N/a	
7	"There Is No I in DMV"	November 24, 2025	0.2/3	2.81	—N/a	—N/a	—N/a	—N/a	
8	"Splash Fountain"	December 1, 2025	0.2/ 3	3.12	—N/a	—N/a	—N/a	—N/a	
9	"The Next Window"	December 8, 2025	0.2/3	3.05	—N/a	—N/a	—N/a	—N/a	
10	"Hot Gurlz"	February 23, 2026	0.2/3	2.74	—N/a	—N/a	—N/a	—N/a	
11	"Power Shift"	March 2, 2026	0.3/3	2.89	—N/a	—N/a	—N/a	—N/a	
12	"The Fourth Wheel"	March 9, 2026	0.3/3	2.87	—N/a	—N/a	—N/a	—N/a	
13	"Test Drive"	March 16, 2026	0.3/3	2.86	—N/a	—N/a	—N/a	—N/a	
14	"Payday"	March 23, 2026	0.3/4	2.99	—N/a	—N/a	—N/a	—N/a	
15	"Gilbert"	March 30, 2026	0.2/3	2.74	—N/a	—N/a	—N/a	—N/a	
16	"Fresh Ink"	April 13, 2026	0.2/3	2.78	—N/a	—N/a	—N/a	—N/a	
17	"Drive-ory Tower"	April 20, 2026	0.2/2	2.71	—N/a	—N/a	—N/a	—N/a	
