= Stephen Dorff =

American actor

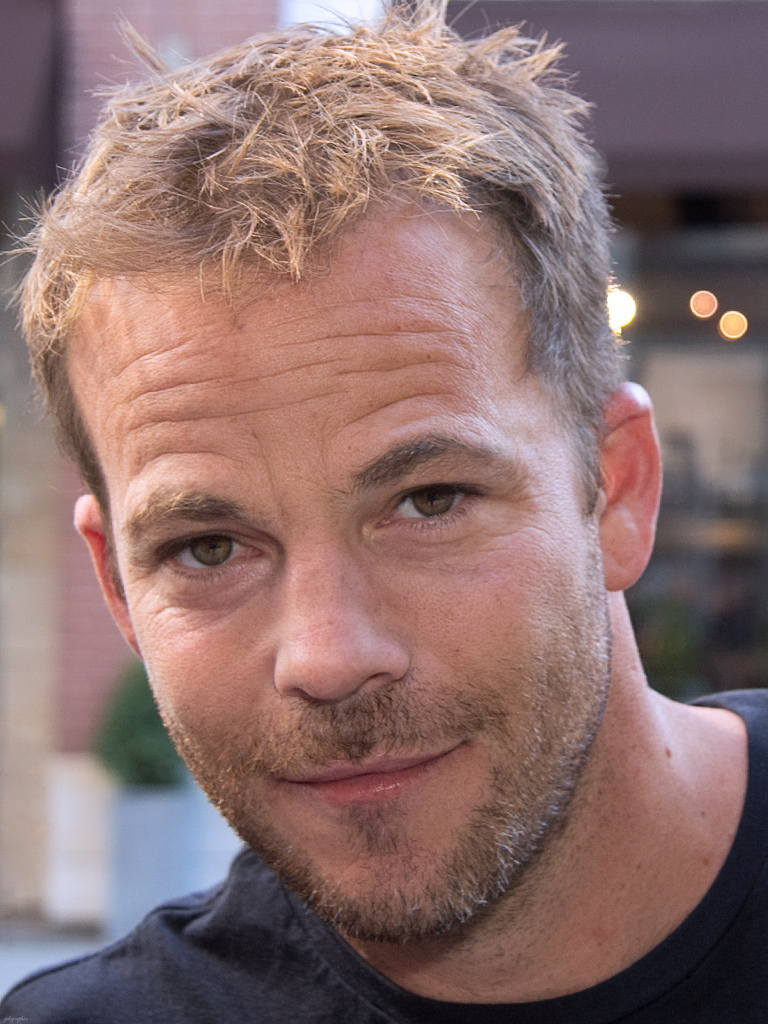
- Dorff in 2012
- Born: Stephen Hartley Dorff Jr. July 29, 1973 (age 53); Atlanta, Georgia, U.S.
- Other name: Brad Matlock
- Occupation: Actor
- Years active: 1985–present
- Father: Steve Dorff

Stephen Hartley Dorff Jr. (born July 29, 1973) is an American actor. Starting his film career as a child appearing in the cult horror film The Gate (1987), Dorff first rose to prominence playing Peter Philip Kennith Keith (nicknamed "PK") in The Power of One (1992) and later as Stuart Sutcliffe in Backbeat (1994) and then gained further mainstream attention for portraying Deacon Frost in Blade (1998). Other notable lead roles include the titular character in John Waters' Cecil B. Demented (2000) and Johnny Marco in Sofia Coppola's Somewhere (2010).

Supporting roles include Candy Darling in I Shot Andy Warhol (1996), Detective Scott Strauss World Trade Center (2006), Homer Van Meter in Public Enemies (2009), Stavros in Immortals (2011), Joseph Kuklinski in The Iceman (2012) and Ketchum in Old Henry (2021). He is also known for portraying Roland West in the third season of HBO's crime drama anthology series True Detective (2019).

== Early life ==
Dorff was born in Atlanta, Georgia, the son of Nancy and Steve Dorff, who is a composer and music producer. His father is Jewish, and his mother was Catholic, and Dorff has stated that he was "brought up half-Jewish." Dorff's brother Andrew (1976–2016) was a country music songwriter. He was raised in Los Angeles, where his father worked, and began acting as a child, appearing in commercials for Kraft and Mattel. Dorff attended several private schools.

== Career ==
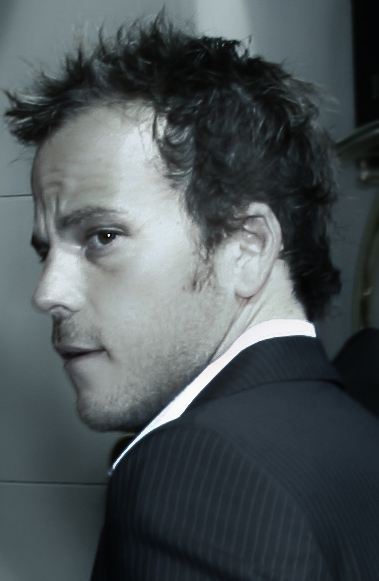
Dorff at the 2008 Toronto International Film Festival.

Dorff started acting in the late 1980s, landing a few minor roles before being cast as the star of The Gate (1987), a horror film about a boy who, along with a friend, discovers a hole in his back yard that is a gateway to hell. The film was a moderate box office success. He made guest appearances in television programs such as Diff'rent Strokes, Family Ties, Blossom, Roseanne, and Married... with Children. He appeared in the television movies In Love and War, I Know My First Name is Steven and What a Dummy. In 1990, he landed a leading role opposite Patty Duke in the TV movie Always Remember I Love You. In 1992, he starred in The Power of One opposite Sir John Gielgud, Morgan Freeman, and Daniel Craig. In 1993, director Marty Callner hired him to star alongside teen idol Alicia Silverstone in the music video "Cryin'" by American rock band Aerosmith. He had a leading role as the love interest of Reese Witherspoon's character in S.F.W. (1994). In 1994, Dorff starred in the Iain Softley film Backbeat as the "fifth Beatle" Stuart Sutcliffe during the early days of the Beatles' existence as a group. Dorff's performance was critically acclaimed, with Paul McCartney remarking that while he was disappointed with some aspects of the film, "I was quite taken, however, with Stephen Dorff's astonishing performance as Stu."

In 1996, he starred in the movie Space Truckers and as Candy Darling in I Shot Andy Warhol, a film about Valerie Solanas, the woman infamous for attempting to assassinate pop art icon Andy Warhol. In 1997 he appeared as the protagonist of Blood and Wine alongside an all-star cast. He was one of the first actors to act in the first digitally downloadable movie, SightSound.com's Quantum Project, also starring John Cleese. He played the protagonist, XIII, of a live action TV series of the comic/video game of XIII. He is known for his part as the evil vampire Deacon Frost in the Marvel Comics superhero horror film, Blade (1998). In 1999 he starred opposite Susan Sarandon in Earthly Possessions. He played Dale Massie in the 2003 thriller Cold Creek Manor, alongside Dennis Quaid and Sharon Stone. In 2004, Dorff starred in the music video for "Everytime" by Britney Spears, playing Spears' boyfriend. He appeared in the 2009 films Public Enemies and Black Water Transit.

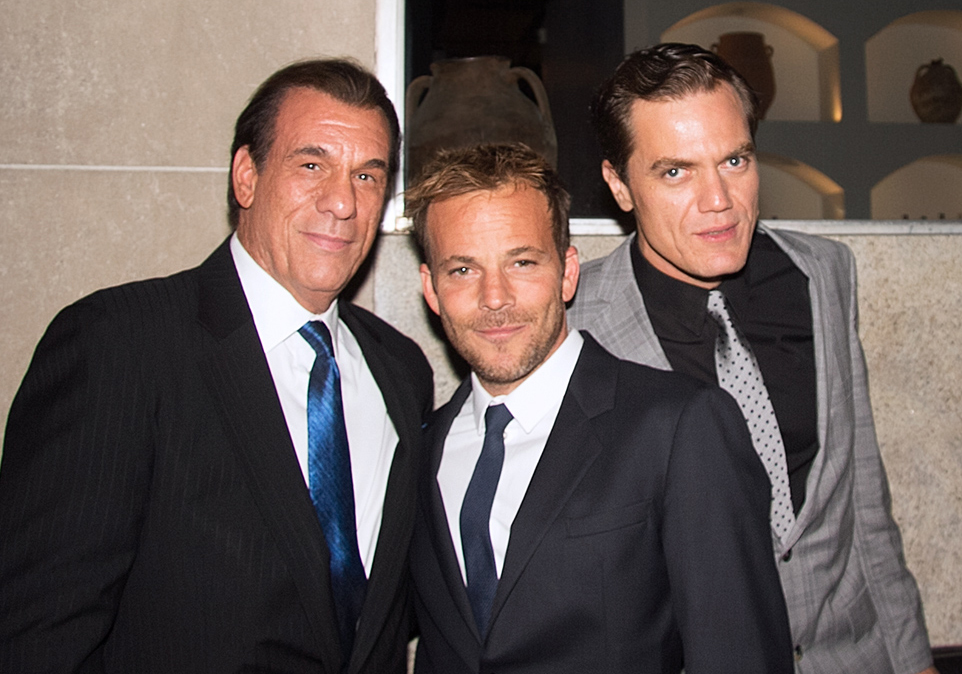
Dorff (center) with Robert Davi and Michael Shannon at the 2012 Toronto International Film Festival

In 2010, he starred in the drama Somewhere opposite Elle Fanning, directed by Sofia Coppola. He described what landing the role meant to him after the loss of his mother as "It almost felt like a savior, this movie, because I felt like it helped me ... I was real empty inside so this was an incredible thing that made me smile."

Dorff appeared as porn star Dick Shadow in the sex industry comedy Bucky Larson: Born to Be a Star, a film produced by Adam Sandler, who also co-wrote the screenplay. Dorff has appeared in television and print advertisements for blu eCigs, an electronic cigarette company. Dorff also starred in The Motel Life opposite Emile Hirsch, Dakota Fanning and Kris Kristofferson and in the crime drama film Officer Down. In 2013, he was a guest of honor on 6th Off Plus Camera In 2017, he played obsessed Texas Ranger Hal Hartman in the Texas Chain Saw Massacre prequel Leatherface. Dorff starred as Detective Roland West in Season 3 of HBO's series True Detective.

== Filmography ==
=== Film ===
Year	Title	Role	Notes
1987	The Gate	Glen	
1992	The Power of One	Peter Phillip "P.K." Kenneth-Keith (age 18)	
1992	Rescue Me	Fraser Sweeney	
1993	An Ambush of Ghosts	George Betts	
1993	Judgment Night	John Wyatt	
1994	Backbeat	Stuart Sutcliffe	
1994	S.F.W.	Cliff Spab	
1995	One Hundred and One Nights	Un Acteur Muet à Hollywood	Cameo
1995	Innocent Lies	Jeremy Graves	
1995	Reckless	Tom Jr.	
1996	I Shot Andy Warhol	Candy Darling	
1996	Blood and Wine	Jason	
1996	Space Truckers	Mike Pucci	
1997	City of Industry	Skip Kovich	
1998	Blade	Deacon Frost	
1999	Entropy	Jake Walsh	
2000	Quantum Project	Paul Pentcho	Short film
2000	Cecil B. Demented	Sinclair / Cecil B. Demented	
2002	Deuces Wild	Leon Anthony	
2002	Steal	"Slim"	
2002	FeardotCom	Detective Mike Reilly	
2003	Den of Lions	Mike Varga	Direct-to-video
2003	Cold Creek Manor	Dale Massie	
2005	Alone in the Dark	Commander Richard Burke	
2005	Tennis, Anyone...?	T.C. Jackson	
2005	Shadowboxer	Clayton Mayfield	
2006	World Trade Center	Detective Scott Strauss	
2006	.45	Reilly	
2007	Botched	Ritchie Donovan	
2007	The Passage	Luke	
2008	Felon	Wade Porter	Direct-to-video; also executive producer
2009	Black Water Transit	Nicky	Unreleased
2009	Public Enemies	Homer Van Meter	
2010	Somewhere	Johnny Marco	
2011	Bucky Larson: Born to Be a Star	Dick Shadow	
2011	Carjacked	Roy	
2011	Immortals	Stavros	
2012	Rites of Passage	Professor Nash	
2012	The Motel Life	Jerry Lee Flannigan	
2012	Brake	Jeremy Reins	Also executive producer
2012	Zaytoun	Yoni	Also executive producer
2012	Tomorrow You're Gone	Charlie Rankin	
2012	The Iceman	Joseph Kuklinski	
2013	Officer Down	Detective David "Cal" Callahan	
2014	Heatstroke	Paul O'Malley	
2015	American Hero	Melvin	
2015	The Debt	Oliver	
2016	Albion: The Enchanted Stallion	Connor	
2017	Leatherface	Ranger Hal Hartman	
2017	Sex Guaranteed	Hank	
2017	Wheeler	Wheeler	Also writer and executive producer
2017	Jackals	Jimmy Levine	
2018	Life Boat	The Counsellor	
2018	Don't Go	Ben Slater	Also executive producer
2019	I'll Find You	General Huber	
2020	Embattled	Cash "The Slayer" Boykins	
2021	Kid 90	Himself	Documentary
2021	Old Henry	Ketchum	
2021	Traveling Light	Todd	
2022	Paradise City	Robbie Cole	
2022	The Price We Pay	Cody	
2023	Divinity	Jaxxon Pierce	
2023	Blood for Dust	Gus	
2023	Dead Man's Hand	Clarence Bishop	
2023	Mob Land	Clayton Minor	
2023	King of Killers	Robert Xane	
2024	Clear Cut	Ike	
2024	The Trainer	TBA	
2025	Gunslingers	Thomas Keller	
2025	Bride Hard	Kurt	
2026	Vampires of the Velvet Lounge	Randall / Ramsey	
2026	Permanent Damage	LL	
TBA	Lear Rex	Poor Tom	Post-production
TBA	What the F*ck Is My Password	TBA	Filming

=== Television ===
Year	Title	Role	Notes
1985	The New Leave It to Beaver	Tony	Episode: "The Gladiators"
1985	Diff'rent Strokes	Scott	Episode: "Sam Adopts a Grandparent"
1987	In Love and War	Stan Stockdale (age 9)	Television film
1988	Family Ties	Martin	Episode: Read It and Weep: Part 1
1988	Mutts	Eric Gillman	Television film
1988	Hiroshima Maiden	Johnny Bennett	Television film
1988	The Absent-Minded Professor	Curtis	Television film
1988	Quiet Victory: The Charlie Wedemeyer Story	Older Kale Wedemeyer	Television film
1989	Empty Nest	Billy (age 14)	Episode: "A Life in the Day"
1989	Married... with Children	Boz	Episode: "The Dateless Amigo"
1989	I Know My First Name Is Steven	Pete	Television film
1989	Do You Know the Muffin Man?	Sandy Dollison	Television film
1989	Roseanne	Jimmy Meltrigger	3 episodes
1990	Father Dowling Mysteries	Mark Oskowski	Episode: "The Sanctuary Mystery"
1990	A Son's Promise	Charles O'Kelley	Television film
1990	The Outsiders	Bobby Dean	Episode: "The Stork Club"
1990	Always Remember I Love You	Robert Mendham	Television film
1990–1991	What a Dummy	Tucker Brannigan	24 episodes
1991	Blossom	Bobby	Episode: "My Sister's Keeper"
1999	Earthly Possessions	Jake Simms Jr.	Television film
2002	Fastlane	Dallas Roberts	Episode: "Gone Native"
2006	Covert One: The Hades Factor	Jonathan Smith	Miniseries
2008	Skip Tracer	Skip King	Pilot
2008	XIII: The Conspiracy	XIII / Steven Rowland / Ross Tanner	Miniseries
2017	Star	Brody Dean	9 episodes
2019	True Detective	Roland West	8 episodes
2020	Deputy	Sheriff Bill Hollister	13 episodes
2023–2025	The Righteous Gemstones	Vance Simkins	8 episodes

=== Music videos ===
Year	Title	Role	Artist
1993	"Cryin'"	Boyfriend	Aerosmith
2000	"Rollin'"	Himself	Limp Bizkit
2004	"Everytime"	Boyfriend	Britney Spears

=== Video game ===
Year	Title	Voice role
2005	Far Cry Instincts	Jack Carver
