= Bride Hard =

2025 film by Simon West

- Theatrical release poster
- Directed by: Simon West
- Screenplay by: Shaina Steinberg
- Story by: CeCe Pleasants Adams; Shaina Steinberg
- Produced by: Max Osswald; Jason Ross Jallet; Joel David Moore; Colleen Camp; Cassian Elwes
- Starring: Rebel Wilson; Anna Camp; Anna Chlumsky; Da'Vine Joy Randolph; Gigi Zumbado; Stephen Dorff; Justin Hartley
- Cinematography: Alan Caudillo
- Edited by: Andrew MacRitchie
- Music by: Ryan Shore
- Production companies: Balcony 9; Elevated
- Distributed by: Magenta Light Studios
- Release date: June 20, 2025
- Running time: 105 minutes
- Country: United States
- Language: English
- Budget: $20 million
- Box office: $2.1 million

Bride Hard is a 2025 American action comedy film directed by Simon West and written by Shaina Steinberg, from a story by Steinberg and CeCe Pleasants. It stars Rebel Wilson, Anna Camp, Anna Chlumsky, Da'Vine Joy Randolph, Gigi Zumbado, Stephen Dorff, and Justin Hartley. The film grossed $2.1 million against a $20 million budget and received negative reviews from critics.

== Plot ==
Maid of honor Sam organizes a bachelorette party in Paris for her childhood best friend Betsy. Unbeknownst to the others, Sam is a secret agent, having arranged the trip to intercept a rogue bioweapon, but her disappearance from the party leads Betsy to drunkenly name her fiancé's sister Virginia as maid of honor instead.

Sam's handler Nadine urges her to attend the wedding anyway, and she arrives in Savannah, Georgia for the festivities, meeting Betsy's fiancé Ryan Caldwell and his wealthy family at their private island estate. Ostracized from the bridal party, Sam flirts with the best man Chris, much to Virginia's jealousy. Before the ceremony begins, Sam's attempt to comfort Betsy backfires, and she slips away after Betsy suggests they have grown apart as friends.

The wedding is taken hostage by a team of mercenaries led by Kurt, who demands access to the Caldwells' vault, which is keyed to the family's wedding rings. Ryan is shot in the leg when it is revealed that Chris, the son of the Caldwells' jailed former business partner, is in league with Kurt. Sam evades capture, subduing several mercenaries and Chris before being assumed dead, but Betsy spots her fighting her way to the kitchen. Convincing Kurt to let her find food for the hostages, Betsy reunites with Sam, who has taken Ryan's ring from Chris.

Betsy returns to the hostages and they overpower the guards, escaping through the house's secret passages to a nearby train depot, while Sam creates a distraction and is captured. Unlocking the vault, the mercenaries steal a fortune in gold bars and an incriminating hard drive, which Chris believes will exonerate his father. Before Kurt can execute them, Sam flees with Chris to the family's distillery, where the mercenaries leave them to boil alive inside a whiskey still, but the bridal party returns to rescue them.

Firing on the mercenaries with the estate's antique cannon, Sam and Betsy give chase across the grounds in a hovercraft, pursued by Chris. Sam fights off the mercenaries and throws Kurt overboard, while Chris demands the hard drive at gunpoint, but Sam and Betsy jump to safety as he crashes in a fiery explosion. Having realized Sam was in danger, Nadine arrives with a rescue team, capturing Kurt and his men.

At the train depot, Betsy marries Ryan in an impromptu ceremony, but they are interrupted by a badly burned Chris, who has Kurt's detonator for explosives planted throughout the house. He is disarmed by a sympathetic Sam, who explains that the hard drive proves his father was working for the mercenaries' criminal employers. Catching the wedding bouquet, Sam accidentally hits the detonator, destroying the Caldwell mansion. Virginia returns the maid of honor role to Sam, who makes a heartfelt toast to Betsy and their friendship, and swears the party to secrecy about her life as a secret agent.

== Cast ==
- Rebel Wilson as Sam
- Anna Camp as Betsy
- Stephen Dorff as Kurt
- Justin Hartley as Chris
- Anna Chlumsky as Virginia
- Da'Vine Joy Randolph as Lydia
- Sherry Cola as Nadine
- Gigi Zumbado as Zoe
- Michael O'Neill as Frank
- Sam Huntington as Ryan
- Colleen Camp as Diane
- Craig Anton as Mark
- Jeff Chase as Magnus
- Mark Valley as Edgar

== Production ==
On May 9, 2023, it was reported that Rebel Wilson would star in the action comedy film Bride Hard, directed by Simon West. The screenplay was written by Shaina Steinberg, based on a story by Steinberg and CeCe Pleasants Adams. Joel David Moore, Max Osswald, Cassian Elwes and Colleen Camp are producing. In August, it was reported that Anna Camp, Justin Hartley, Da'Vine Joy Randolph, Anna Chlumsky, Stephen Dorff, Gigi Zumbado, Sam Huntington, Sherry Cola, and Michael O'Neill had joined the cast.

The film received an interim agreement from SAG-AFTRA due to the union's strike at the time.

Principal photography began in July 2023 in Savannah, Georgia and wrapped in August. While filming a fight scene, Wilson was accidentally struck in the face with the butt of a gun, requiring stitches.

=== Music ===
The score for the film was composed by Ryan Shore. The theme song "Butterfly" was written and composed for the film by Yoshiki and performed by Bi-ray.

== Release ==
In September 2023, Signature Entertainment acquired the distribution rights for the film in the United Kingdom and Ireland. In January 2025, Magenta Light Studios acquired the U.S. distribution rights, with a wide theatrical release planned for later in the year. The film was released on June 20, 2025.

== Reception ==
On the review aggregator website Rotten Tomatoes, 14% of 50 critics' reviews are positive, with an average rating of 3.1/10. The website's consensus reads: "Nobody's catching this bouquet." Metacritic, which uses a weighted average, assigned the film a score of 23 out of 100, based on 13 critics, indicating "generally unfavorable" reviews. Audiences polled by CinemaScore gave the film an average grade of "B-" on an A+ to F scale.

William Bibbiani of TheWrap wrote, "It's abrasively hard to watch. It's not just that the jokes fall flat, it's that the film looks like a pile of celluloid got chopped up randomly and reassembled in what the editor could only assume was the correct order, because the script mysteriously vanished."

Mark Kennedy of the Associated Press wrote, "Take your average wedding flick, shotgun a hostage situation into it and add some anarchic energy from Rebel Wilson and you get Bride Hard, which is a movie, for better or for worse. In this case, much, much worse."

=== Accolades ===
Accolades received by Bride Hard
Award	Date of ceremony	Category	Recipient(s)	Result	Ref.
Golden Raspberry Awards	March 14, 2026	Worst Actress	Rebel Wilson	Won	
Golden Raspberry Awards	March 14, 2026	Worst Supporting Actor	Stephen Dorff	Nominated	
Golden Raspberry Awards	March 14, 2026	Worst Supporting Actress	Anna Chlumsky	Nominated	
