= Officer Down =

- Directed by: Brian A. Miller
- Written by: John Chase
- Starring: Stephen Dorff; Dominic Purcell; David Boreanaz; AnnaLynne McCord; Soulja Boy; Stephen Lang; James Woods; Walton Goggins; Tommy Flanagan; Oleg Taktarov; Elisabeth Röhm
- Edited by: Bob Mori
- Music by: Jerome Dillon
- Release date: January 18, 2013
- Running time: 99 minutes
- Country: United States
- Language: English
- Box office: $1,463 (US)

Officer Down is a 2013 American action film directed by Brian A. Miller. Stephen Dorff plays a corrupt cop who seeks redemption.

== Plot ==
Police detective David 'Cal' Callahan (Stephen Dorff) takes down a rapist cop but his boss Captain Verona (James Woods) cuts a deal to sweep the embarrassing situation under the rug. Cal is still haunted by a traffic stop where he was almost killed.

== Cast ==
- Stephen Dorff as Detective David Callahan
- Dominic Purcell as Royce Walker
- David Boreanaz as Detective Les Scanlon
- Bree Michael Warner as Detective Brogan
- Brette Taylor as Assistant District Attorney Loughlin
- AnnaLynne McCord as Zhanna Dronova
- Zoran Radanovich as Ivan Zavulon / Sergei Dronov
- Soulja Boy Tell 'Em as Rudy
- Jas Anderson as Ellis Dracut
- Stephen Lang as Lieutenant Jake LaRussa
- James Woods as Captain John Verona
- Elisabeth Röhm as Alexandra Callahan
- Walton Goggins as Detective Nick Logue / Angel
- Laura Harris as Ellen Logue
- Tommy Flanagan as Father Reddy
- Oleg Taktarov as Oleg Emelyanenko
- Johnny Messner as McAlister
- Kamaliya as Katya
- Bea Miller as Lanie Callahan
- Marisa Pierinias as Monica Logue
- A.K. Debris as James
- Misha Kuznetsov as Sergei Dronov

== Development ==
The film was first announced on May 3, 2011. Filming began later that week in Connecticut. The film's screenplay was written by John Chase and it is directed by Brian A Miller. Locations where the movie was filmed include Roberto's Restaurant on State St, Fairfield Ave and inside a new apartment complex also located on Fairfield Ave, in Bridgeport CT. The first images from the set were revealed on May 6, 2011.

At the 2012 Cannes Film Festival, it was announced that the film would be distributed by Anchor Bay. The film's official poster was also revealed at the Cannes Film Festival.

== Release ==
Anchor Bay gave it a limited release on January 18, 2013, and it grossed $1,463 in the US.

== Reception ==
Mark Olsen of the Los Angeles Times called it "an overstuffed story that comes off not as layered but rather as an unfocused jumble".
