= Amazon Eve =

American actress

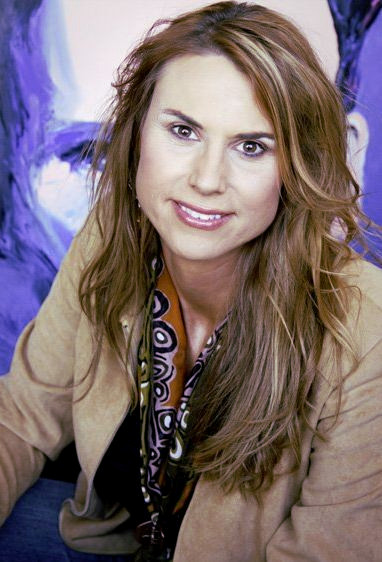
- Ervin in 2012
- Born: February 23, 1979 (age 47); Turlock, California, U.S.
- Occupations: Model; fitness trainer; actress
- Years active: 2011–present
- Modeling information
- Height: 6 ft 8 in (2.03 m)
- Hair color: Red
- Eye color: Hazel
- Agency: Artist International

Erika Ervin (born February 23, 1979), known professionally as Amazon Eve, is an American model, fitness trainer, and actress. She has appeared on the cover of Australian magazine Zoo Weekly and played a regular character on American Horror Story: Freak Show and in a small role in American Horror Story: Apocalypse. She stands 6 feet 8 inches (2.03 m) tall.

== Early life and education ==
Ervin was born in Turlock, California, and by age 14 was 5 feet 11 inches (1.80 m). She grew 9 inches (23 cm) taller over the next four years. Around age 25, she underwent gender-affirming surgery. Ervin attended college in the San Francisco Bay Area and studied theater arts and business management.

== Career ==
Ervin ventured to obtain roles as an actress but gave up on the idea when she was constantly offered roles as an alien or monster. Later she studied law and exercise physiology. Tired of the office life that she had pursued and unhappy with her weight, she joined a gym but strove for an unrealistic size 0 physique that almost resulted in ending her life. Eventually she developed a healthier body image and began to view herself as a super-sized version of Super Woman and became a personal trainer devoted to instilling realistic expectations for herself and her clients. She tours the world participating in height comparison photo shoots and regular modeling jobs and posts her tour on her website.

In 2011, she was crowned the World's Tallest Professional Model by Guinness World Records.

=== Appearances ===
In the September 2013 issue of Harper's Bazaar, Carine Roitfeld, former editor-in-chief of Vogue Paris, wrote an article, "Carine Roitfeld's 'Singular Beauties'", with photographs by Karl Lagerfeld. The article includes 25 models and is "an homage to the diversity of women". Among the models are Scarlett Johansson, Carmen Dell'Orefice (82 years old), Gabourey Sidibe, and Ervin, who is paired with 5'9" Xiao Wen. There is also a video about the making of the article in which Xiao Wen and Ervin appear.

== Personal life ==
Ervin underwent gender-affirming surgery in 2004. In interviews, Ervin has talked about the problems of being a tall woman. Other topics she has addressed include her troubles growing up dealing with teasing in high school, family problems and her modeling experience.

== Filmography ==
=== Film ===
Year	Title	Role	Notes
2011	Google Maps is Watching You	—N/a	Short film
2017	Whitney's Wedding	—N/a	Short film
2017	Falling South	—N/a	Short film
2018	Chimera	Dita Gruze	
2022	The Price We Pay	Jodi	

=== Television ===
Year	Title	Role	Notes
2013	Family Tools	Tall Client Lady	Episode: "Pilot"
2013	Hemlock Grove	Shelley Godfrey	5 episodes
2014–2015	American Horror Story: Freak Show	Amazon Eve	13 episodes
2018	Agents of S.H.I.E.L.D.	Lady Karaba	Episode: "Fun & Games"
2018	American Horror Story: Apocalypse	The Fist	3 episodes
