= SightSound =

- Industry: Intellectual Property & Audio / Video eCommerce
- Founded: 1995; 31 years ago
- Headquarters: Pittsburgh, USA
- Key people: Arthur R. Hair & Scott C. Sander (founders)
- Website: http://www.sightsound.com/

SightSound Technologies is an intellectual property company focused on licensing its portfolio of domestic and international patents. SightSound Technologies has been issued 50 patents.

== History ==
SightSound Technologies began in the mid-1980s when company founder Arthur R. Hair invented a method and system for the electronic sale of digital audio and video recordings. In 1995, Mr. Hair and Scott C. Sander founded SightSound Technologies to commercialize Hair’s invention. On March 2, 1993, Arthur Hair was issued his first patent, "Method for Transmitting a Desired Digital Video or Audio Signal."

On August 18, 1995, SightSound Technologies signed the first distribution deal with a recording artist to sell music on the internet as file downloads: The Gathering Field sold their debut album on SightSound.com.

On October 7, 1997, Arthur Hair receives his second patent, "System for Transmitting Desired Digital Video or Audio Signals."

On April 13, 1999, SightSound Technologies sold Darren Aronofsky's Pi as a pay-per-view download, making it the first ever film to be sold as a download on the Internet. On April 18, 2000, SightSound Technologies announced an agreement with Miramax to distribute twelve of its films for download via Miramax's websites.

On May 5, 2000, SightSound releases Quantum Project, the first celebrity-driven movie created to be distributed solely through the internet. Quantum Project stars Stephen Dorff, Fay Masterson and John Cleese.
