= Gigi Zumbado =

American actress

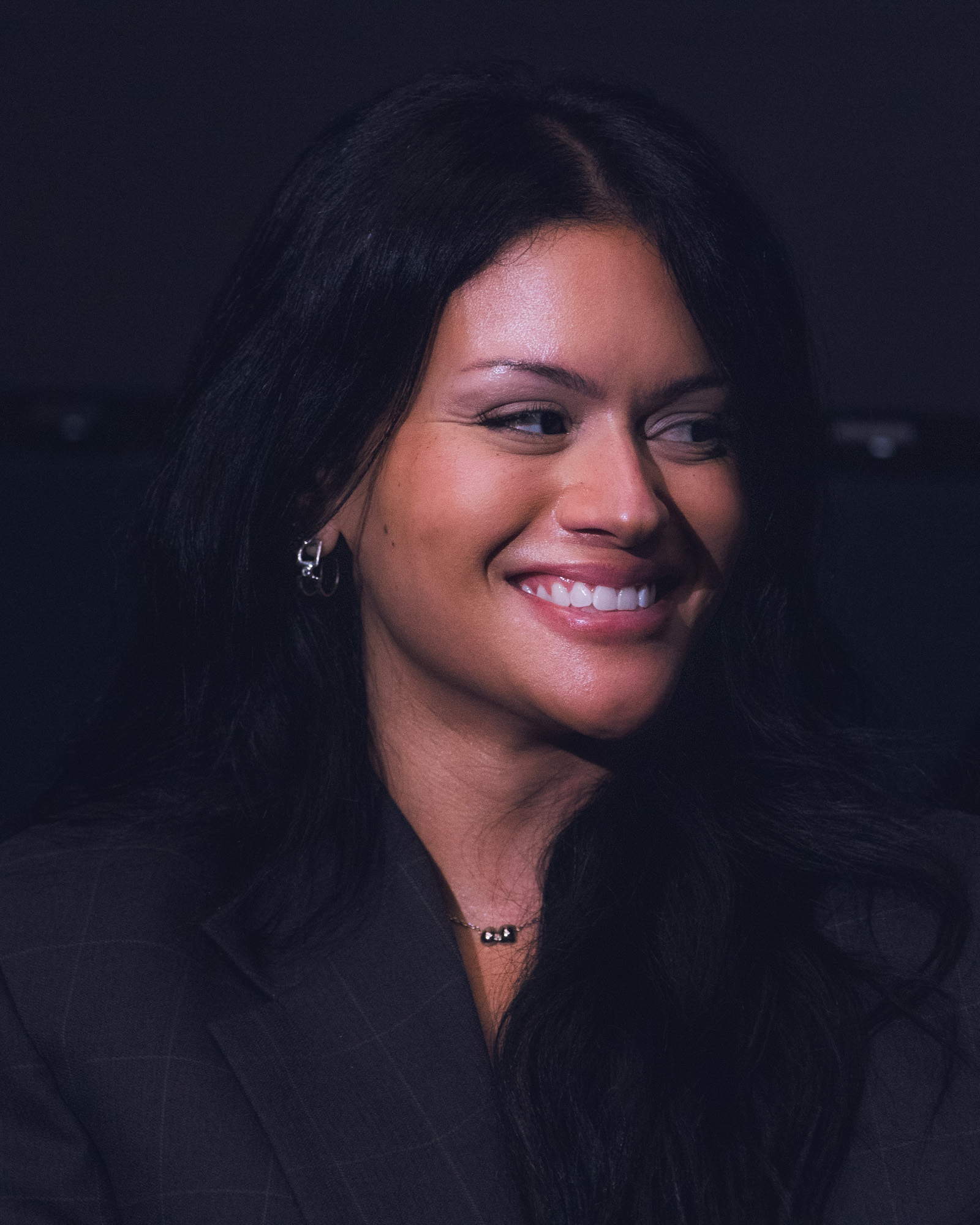
- Zumbado in 2025
- Born: Miami, Florida, U.S.
- Education: Florida Atlantic University
- Occupation: Actress
- Years active: 2014–present
- Relatives: Carmela Zumbado (sister); Marisela Zumbado (sister)

Gigi Zumbado is an American actress. She is best known for her roles as Tammy Ocampo in Epix's comedy drama series Bridge and Tunnel and as Abril Rodas in ABC's drama series The Rookie.

== Early life and education ==
Zumbado is a first-generation Cuban American and was born and raised in Miami, Florida. She is the daughter of Emmy Award-winning photojournalist Tony Zumbado and Lilliam Zumbado. She is the youngest of three siblings; her older sisters, Carmela and Marisela, are also actresses. Zumbado attended Florida Atlantic University, where she graduated with a Bachelor's degree in music.

== Career ==
Zumbado has appeared in episodes of Scream, Graceland and Criminal Minds.

Zumbado has held recurring roles in Fox's procedural drama 9-1-1, in which she played the role of Officer Diane Stafford. She also held a recurring role in The Rookie, playing villainous Abril Rodas. She would reprise her role as Abril Rodas in spin-off show The Rookie: Feds.

In 2021, Zumbado landed a leading role in Epix's comedy drama series Bridge and Tunnel, playing the role of Tammy Ocampo. In 2022, she co-starred in the American horror film The Price We Pay, directed by Ryuhei Kitamura.

In 2025, Zumbado starred as Monica in romantic comedy slasher film Heart Eyes, alongside Mason Gooding and Olivia Holt.

In September 2025, Zumbado appeared in the Bi-ray music video "Butterfly (Narrative Version)" directed by Japanese rock star Yoshiki.

== Filmography ==
=== Television ===
| Year | Title | Role | Notes |
|---|---|---|---|
| 2014 | Graceland | Girl | 2 episodes |
| 2016 | Scream | Darlene | 1 episode |
| 2017 | The Boonies | Karsen | |
| 2018 | Criminal Minds | Olivia Taveras | 1 episode |
| 2020–2021 | 9-1-1 | Officer Diane Stafford | 3 episodes |
| 2021 | Fantasy Island | Alma | 1 episode |
| 2021–2022 | Bridge and Tunnel | Tammy Ocampo | 11 episodes |
| 2021–2023 | The Rookie | Abril Rodas | 3 episodes |
| 2022 | Promised Land | Nati Rojas | 3 episodes |
| 2023 | The Rookie: Feds | Abril Rodas | 1 episode |
| 2024 | Hightown | Emma | 3 episodes |
| 2024 | Doctor Odyssey | Amelia | 1 episode |
| 2025–2026 | DMV | Ceci | Main Cast |
| 2026 | The Lincoln Lawyer | Grace | |

=== Film ===
| Year | Title | Role | Notes |
|---|---|---|---|
| 2015 | Pitch Perfect 2 | The Cantasticos | |
| 2018 | A Night to Regret | Sara | |
| 2019 | Gothic Harvest | Young Blanche Boudine | |
| 2019 | Tone-Deaf | Frankie | |
| 2020 | Run Sweetheart Run | Michelle | |
| 2023 | The Price We Pay | Grace | |
| 2024 | The Real Bros of Simi Valley: The Movie | Hannah | |
| 2025 | Heart Eyes | Monica | |
| 2025 | Idiotka | Amalie | |
| 2025 | Bride Hard | Zoe | |
| TBA | Tumor † | | Post-production |
