= Tyler Sanders =

American actor (2004–2022)

- Born: February 25, 2004
- Died: June 16, 2022 (aged 18); Los Angeles, California, U.S.
- Occupation: Actor
- Years active: 2015–2022

Tyler Sanders (February 25, 2004 – June 16, 2022) was an American child actor.

== Life and career ==
Sanders began acting when he was 10 years old. In 2017, he booked his first TV role as the younger version of Jake Otto in Fear the Walking Dead. Later, his role was achieved to fame such as Just Add Magic: Mystery City, for which he was nominated for the Daytime Emmy Award for Outstanding Principal Performance in a Children's Program in 2021. His final performance was in an episode of 9-1-1: Lone Star that aired on April 18, 2022.

== Death ==
Sanders died at his home in Los Angeles on June 16, 2022, at the age of 18, following an accidental fentanyl overdose.

The 2022 film The Price We Pay, in which he played the role of Danny, premiered at FrightFest 2022 on August 26, 2022, and was dedicated to his memory.

== Filmography ==
Film
Year	Work	Role	Notes
2015	Little Socrates	Meletus	Short film
2016	The Radical	Jason	Short film
2017	Jimmy the Hall Monitor	Jimmy	Short film
2017	Gordon and Milo	Milo	Short film
2017	Chris	Shane	Short film
2017	Jack	Michael	Short film
2019	The Reliant	Eli	—N/a
2020	Milk Teeth	Charlie	Short film
2020	A Shot in the Dark	Cole	Short film
2022	The Price We Pay	Danny	Posthumous release
2022	Shock!	Tony	Short film, posthumous release

Television
Year	Work	Role	Notes
2015	JLW Academy	Himself	—N/a
2017	Fear the Walking Dead	Young Jake Otto	—N/a
2017	What About Barb?	Siggy	TV movie
2018	The Rookie	Logan Hawke	Episode: "The Hawke"
2019	Just Add Magic	Leo	Episode: "New Protectors"
2020	Escaping My Stalker	Ronny	TV movie
2020	Just Add Magic: Mystery City	Leo	Main role
2022	9-1-1: Lone Star	Brian	Final role

== Nominations ==
Award	Date of ceremony	Title	Status
Daytime Emmy Award	June 25, 2021	Just Add Magic: Mystery City	Nominated
