= Colleen Camp =

American actress and film producer (born 1953)

- Camp in 2026
- Born: Colleen Celeste Camp; June 7, 1953 (age 73); San Francisco, California, U.S.
- Occupations: Actress; film producer
- Years active: 1973–present
- Known for: The Swinging Cheerleaders; Apocalypse Now
- Spouse: John Goldwyn (m. 1986; div. 2001)
- Children: 1

Colleen Celeste Camp (born June 7, 1953) is an American character actress and producer. After appearing in several bit parts, she had a leading role in the comedy The Swinging Cheerleaders (1974), followed by roles in two installments of the Police Academy series. Camp had supporting roles in Lady of the House (1978), Apocalypse Now (1979), and The Seduction (1982), after which she played Julie Richman (Deborah Foreman)’s mother Sarah in Valley Girl (1983) and the maid Yvette in the comedy film Clue (1985).

Camp has continued to have minor and supporting roles in various independent and studio films, including Die Hard with a Vengeance (1995), Election (1999), Factory Girl (2006), Palo Alto (2013), American Hustle (2013), and The House with a Clock in Its Walls (2018).

== Early life ==
Colleen Camp was born in San Francisco, California. She has two brothers, Don and Glenn. She moved to the San Fernando Valley at a young age and attended John H. Francis Polytechnic High School and Los Angeles Valley College.

== Career ==
To help pay for college, Camp trained macaws at Busch Gardens on weeknights, weekends, and then during summers performing for crowds of up to 2,000 in six shows a day, six days a week. Aspiring to be an actress, Camp took private acting and singing lessons. She was noticed by a talent agent for her hour-long Busch Gardens television special featuring her and her birds, and hired for national-television commercials for Gallo wine and Touch of Sweden hand lotion. This exposure led to small television parts in shows such as Marcus Welby, M.D., Happy Days, and Love, American Style, as well as a six-episode stint on the miniseries Rich Man, Poor Man.

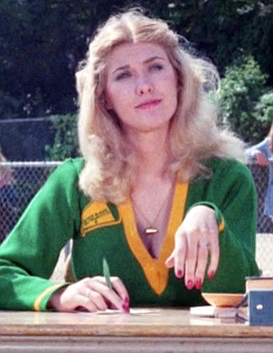
Camp in The Swinging Cheerleaders (1974)

Camp landed small early roles in films like Funny Lady with Barbra Streisand and James Caan, and Smile with Bruce Dern and Barbara Feldon in 1975. She also appeared in the Bruce Lee movie Game of Death (1978) as his character Billy Lo's girlfriend, Ann Morris, the young aspiring singer (her scenes were shot with a lookalike as Lee had died before she became involved) performing the film's love theme "Will This Be The Song I'll Be Singing Tomorrow". Camp went on to portray a Playmate in Francis Coppola's 1979 film Apocalypse Now (followed by an actual pictorial in the October 1979 Playboy), though most of her footage was cut from the initial theatrical release. She would later feature more prominently in Coppola's Redux cut. She was also the first actress to play Kristin Shepard, the sister of Linda Gray's character Sue Ellen Ewing, in the primetime soap opera Dallas in 1979. Mary Crosby later replaced Camp in this role.

Camp worked steadily in film comedies like Peter Bogdanovich's 1981 comedy They All Laughed, 1983's Valley Girl, 1985's Clue, and the 1994 Michael J. Fox comedy Greedy. She played police officers in two of the Police Academy films and in Die Hard with a Vengeance. Camp was nominated twice for the Worst Supporting Actress Golden Raspberry Award – first, in 1982, for The Seduction, and then, in 1993, for Sliver. In 1999, she had a small part as character Tracy Flick's overbearing mother Judith in the film Election, with Reese Witherspoon as Tracy. She appeared in the episode "Simple Explanation" of House in 2009.

In 2013, she appeared in a supporting role in David O. Russell's American Hustle The following year, Camp co-produced a Broadway production of Love Letters and in 2015 she co-produced and appeared in Eli Roth's thriller Knock Knock — a remake of Death Game (1977, filmed 1974), which she'd acted in.

In September 2025, Camp appeared in the Bi-ray music video "Butterfly (Narrative Version)" directed by Japanese rock star Yoshiki.

== Personal life ==
In the late 1970s, Camp dated Dean Tavoularis, whom she met in the Philippines while filming Apocalypse Now. In 1986, she married John Goldwyn, a Paramount executive; they later divorced in 2001.

In November 2020, Camp's engagement to 34-year-old Garrett Moore, son of photographer Derry Moore, 12th Earl of Drogheda, was announced. However, they never married, and Camp later described the pairing as "a joke that went too far".

== Filmography ==
=== Film ===
Year	Title	Role	Notes
1973	Battle for the Planet of the Apes	Julie	Uncredited
1974	The Last Porno Flick		Also known as: Those Mad, Mad Moviemakers
1974	The Swinging Cheerleaders	Mary Ann Putnam	
1975	Funny Lady	Billy's Girl	
1975	Smile	Connie	
1976	Ebony, Ivory & Jade	Ginger Douglas	
1976	The Gumball Rally	Franco's Date	
1976	Amelia Earhart	Starlet	
1977	Death Game	Donna	
1977	Love and the Midnight Auto Supply	Billie Jean	
1978	Game of Death	Ann Morris	
1978	Lady of the House	Rosette	
1978	Cat in the Cage	Gilda Riener	
1979	Apocalypse Now	Playmate	
1980	Cloud Dancer	Cindy	
1981	They All Laughed	Christy Miller	
1982	The Seduction	Robin Dunlap	
1982	Deadly Games	Randy	
1983	Valley Girl	Sarah Richman	
1983	Smokey and the Bandit Part 3	Dusty Trails	
1983	Trial by Terror		
1984	The City Girl	Rose	Also associate producer
1984	Joy of Sex	Liz Sampson	
1984	The Rosebud Beach Hotel	Tracy King	
1985	Police Academy 2: Their First Assignment	Sgt. Kathleen Kirkland	
1985	Doin' Time	Nancy Catlett	
1985	D.A.R.Y.L.	Elaine Fox	
1985	Clue	Yvette	
1986	Screwball Academy	Liberty Jean	Straight-to-video
1987	Police Academy 4: Citizens on Patrol	Mrs. Kirkland-Tackleberry	
1987	Walk Like a Man	Rhonda Shand	
1988	Illegally Yours	Molly Gilbert	
1988	Track 29	Arlanda	
1989	Wicked Stepmother	Jenny Fisher	
1990	My Blue Heaven	Dr. Margaret Snow Coopersmith	
1992	Wayne's World	Mrs. Vanderhoff	
1992	The Vagrant	Judy Dansig	
1992	Unbecoming Age	Deborah	
1993	Sliver	Judy Marks	
1993	Last Action Hero	Ratcliff	
1993	Naked in New York	Auditioner	
1994	Greedy	Patti McTeague-Alt	
1995	Die Hard with a Vengeance	Connie Kowalski	
1995	The Baby-Sitters Club	Maureen McGill	
1995	Three Wishes	Neighbor's Wife	
1996	House Arrest	Mrs. Burtis	
1996	The Associate	Detective Jones	
1996	The Lone Star Letters	Deulah Pooch	
1997	The Ice Storm	Dr. Pasmier	
1997	Plump Fiction	Viv	
1997	Speed 2: Cruise Control	Debbie	
1999	Election	Judith R. Flick	
1999	Love Stinks	Monica Harris	
1999	Goosed	Jane	
1999	Jazz Night	Marge Winslow	
2000	Loser	Homeless Woman	
2001	Someone Like You...	Realtor	
2001	An American Rhapsody	Dottie	Also co-producer
2001	Rat Race	Rainbow House Nurse	
2002	Joshua	Joan Casey	
2002	Second to Die	Cynthia Evans	
2002	Trapped	Joan Evans	
2004	Who's Your Daddy?	Beverly Hughes	
2004	L.A. Twister	Judith	
2004	In Good Company	Receptionist	
2005	Rumor Has It...	Pasadenan Wife	
2006	Material Girls	Charlene	
2006	Running with Scissors	Joan	
2006	Factory Girl	Mrs. Whitley	
2007	Noise	Mrs. Broomell	
2008	Four Christmases	Aunt Donna	
2009	Winter of Frozen Dreams	Mrs. Davies	
2009	Cirque du Freak: The Vampire's Assistant	Mrs. Shan	
2009	Porky's Pimpin' Pee Wee	Helen Morris	
2010	Burning Palms	Barbara Barish	
2010	Psych:9	Beth	
2011	Balls to the Wall	Maureen	
2011	Hollywood & Wine	Judge Head	
2011	Love, Wedding, Marriage	Ethel	
2011	Homecoming	Cathy	
2012	A Glimpse Inside the Mind of Charles Swan III	Karen	
2013	Palo Alto	Sally	
2013	American Hustle	Brenda	
2014	Chicanery	Regina Moon	
2014	She's Funny That Way	Cece	Also associate producer
2015	Knock Knock	Vivian	Also co-producer
2015	Grandma	Bonobo Customer	
2015	Joy	Lori	
2016	Always Shine	Sandra	
2017	An Imperfect Murder	Elaine Lockman	
2017	The Truth About Lies	May	Also co-producer
2018	The House with a Clock in Its Walls	Mrs. Hanchett	
2019	Above Suspicion	Jolene's Customer	Also producer
2020	Spenser Confidential	Betty	
2020	Mainstream	Judy	
2021	Violet	Connie Campos	
2022	9 Bullets	Drew	
2022	Father Stu	Motel Receptionist	Also executive producer
2022	Monstrous	Mrs. Langtree	Also executive producer
2022	Amsterdam	Eva Ott	
2022	5-25-77	Janet Johnson	
2023	Back on the Strip	Rita	
2024	The Deliverance	Doctor Hoffsteder	
2024	The Trainer	Will's Mom	
2024	All Happy Families	Lila	
2025	Bride Hard	Diane	Also producer
2025	Borderline		Executive producer
2026	The Saviors	Mrs. Harrison	
2026	Club Kid	Evelyn	
2026	Street Smart	Real Estate Agent	
2026	Madden	Mrs. Simmons	
2027	Stiletto		Completed
TBA	The Decline of Fucking Western Civilization		Filming

=== Television ===
Year	Title	Role	Notes
1973	Marcus Welby, M.D.	Betty Adams	1 episode
1973	Love, American Style	Jane / Diane	2 episodes
1975	Happy Days	Rose	1 episode
1976	Harry O	Karen Bremmer	1 episode
1976	Doc		1 episode
1976	The Secrets of Isis	Wynn	1 episode
1976	Starsky & Hutch	Bobette	1 episode
1976–1977	Rich Man, Poor Man—Book II	Vicki St. John	6 episodes
1976	Man from Atlantis	Amanda	1 episode
1979	Dallas	Kristin Shepard	2 episodes
1981	The Dukes of Hazzard	Bonnie Lane	1 episode
1982	WKRP in Cincinnati	Herself	1 episode
1984	Magnum, P.I.	Valerie Cane	1 episode
1985	Tales from the Darkside	Connie Squires	1 episode
1987–1988	Murder, She Wrote	Dody Rogers / Dep. Marigold Feeney	2 episodes
1988	Addicted to His Love	Ellie Snyder	Television film
1990	Tales from the Crypt	Mrs. Mildred Korman	1 episode
1991	Thirtysomething	Deborah Branchflower Diggs	1 episode
1991	Backfield in Motion	Laurie	Television film
1993	For Their Own Good	Chris	Television film
1993–1996	Roseanne	Jill / Dawn / Secretary	3 episodes
1994	Tom	Kara Wilhoit	12 episodes
1996	The Right to Remain Silent	Mrs. Buford Lowry	Television film
1996	Suddenly	Jude	Television film
2000	Bar Hopping	Chick with Ax to Grind	Television film
2001	How to Make a Monster	Faye Clayton	Television film; also producer
2005	Mystery Woman: Mystery Weekend	Maura Hobbs	Television film
2006	Dead and Deader	Mrs. Wisteria	Television film
2006–2007	The Minor Accomplishments of Jackie Woodman	Angela Birnbaum	4 episodes
2007	Entourage	Marjorie	2 episodes
2009	House	Charlotte	1 episode
2012	Waffle Hut	Carla	Television film
2013	Mob City	Woman in Restaurant	2 episodes
2014	Rake	Judge Yvonne Ritsema	1 episode
2015	American Dad!	Dr. Temperance "Bones" Brennan (voice)	1 episode
2016	Aquarius		3 episodes
2017	Signed, Sealed, and Delivered: Home Again	Sunny Haywith	Television film
2018	Andi Mack	Cookie	1 episode
2019	Sherman's Showcase	Herself	1 episode
2020	The Twilight Zone	Chantal Stargazer	1 episode
2024	Matlock	Sherlene	1 episode
2026	Euphoria	LA Nights Director	4 episodes
