= Tanner Zagarino =

American actor (born 1998)

- Born: 1998 (age 27–28); Los Angeles, California
- Known for: actor

Tanner Zagarino (born 1998) is an American actor, model, and former wrestler. He is best known for his role as Redbird in The Summer I Turned Pretty, and is also known as Shane in The Price We Pay and as Dylan in Shrinking. He has been cast in The Land.

== Biography ==
He was born in Los Angeles but raised in New York. His father is Frank Zagarino. He attended Mattituck High School, where he was a high school wrestler and was awarded in invitationals, ultimately winning the New York state Wrestling Competition in 2017. He continued as a wrestler at the University of Pittsburgh. He was also an influencer: by 2015, he had over 500,000 followers.

He appeared in Alli Simpson's "Notice Me" music video in 2013. As a model, he collaborated with Old Navy and Aeropostale, and was signed to Wilhelmina Models.

He has described one of his inspirations as an actor to be I Love You, Man. In 2020, he appeared in made-for-TV slasher movie Pool Boy Nightmare as the main antagonist, where he was described as having "effective and melodramatic insanity" by The Farsighted. He has also appeared in The Real Bros of Simi Valley: The Movie, 9-1-1: Lone Star, The Price We Pay, Aftermath, and Shrinking. In The Price We Pay, he played one of the leads, Shane, and in Shrinking, he played love interest Dylan.

He gained attention after appearing as "frat bro" character Redbird in Season 3 of The Summer I Turned Pretty, where he was described as adding "unexpected depth and complexity to the role" by Instinct. He has described his role as "bringing... a lot more fun" and helping main character Jeremiah Fisher let loose. Despite the character being straight in the book trilogy, in the show Redbird is bisexual. During the show release, fans speculated about an in-show relationship between Redbird and Fisher, a theory described as "viral" by Capital UK, but this was ultimately not the case.

In May 2026, Zagarino signed with Creative Artists Agency.

He has been cast in The Land, an upcoming sports drama series on Hulu by Dan Fogelman. He will be in a lead role; he is believed to play the elder son of Christopher Meloni's character.
