= The Land (TV series) =

Upcoming American family sports drama series

- Genre: Sports drama; Family drama
- Created by: Dan Fogelman
- Starring: Christopher Meloni; William H. Macy; Mandy Moore; Chloe Bennet; Chace Crawford; Sam Corlett; Tanner Zagarino
- Country of origin: United States
- Original language: English

Production
- Executive producers: Dan Fogelman; Jess Rosenthal; David Ellison; Jesse Sisgold; Jason T. Reed
- Production companies: Rhode Island Ave. Productions; Skydance Sports; NFL Films; 20th Television

Original release
- Network: Hulu

The Land is an upcoming American sports drama television series created by Dan Fogelman, and starring Christopher Meloni, William H. Macy, and Mandy Moore. The series is set to premiere on Hulu on February 15, 2027.

== Premise ==
The series follows a fictional version of the Cleveland Browns of the NFL, while also exploring a generational family component.

== Cast ==
=== Main ===
- Christopher Meloni as Cleveland Browns head coach Danny Roarke
- William H. Macy as Hank Durkin
- Mandy Moore as Lauren Durkin
- Chloe Bennet
- Chace Crawford
- Sam Corlett as rookie Browns quarterback Connor Roarke
- Tanner Zagarino

=== Recurring ===
- Omar Epps
- Michael McGrady
- Calahan Skogman
- Thomas Q. Jones
- Bridget Moynahan
- Benjamin Bratt

== Episodes ==
No.	Title	Directed by	Written by	Original release date
1	"Pilot"	TBA	Dan Fogelman	February 15, 2027
2	TBA	TBA	Jason Wilborn	February 15, 2027
3	"Monday Night Football"	David Boyd	Yasmin Almanaseer	TBA
4	"GoodBye Week"	Jessica Yu	Dana Calvo & Bradley Kaaya Jr.	TBA
5	"Land of Dysfunction"	David Boyd	Kevin Falls & Joshua Kelley	TBA
6	"Elevation"	Paris Barclay	Chinaka Hodge	TBA
7	TBA	TBA	Taylor Hamra	TBA
8	TBA	TBA	Justin Adler	TBA
9	TBA	TBA	Dana Calvo & Kevin Falls	TBA
10	TBA	TBA	Justin Adler & Alyson Lo	TBA

== Production ==
=== Development ===
In October 2024, Hulu commissioned the series, with Dan Fogelman set as creator and writer. While the series had no title, it was described as "a sprawling drama set inside the world of the NFL with a generational family component." Fogelman and Jess Rosenthal would executive produces via their production company, Rhode Island Ave. Productions. David Ellison, Jesse Sisgold, and Jason T. Reed would also executive produce through Skydance Sports, with NFL Films and 20th Television as other production companies. In January 2026, the series was officially titled The Land, with the setting taking place in Cleveland.

In September 2026, it was reported that the American football player Joshua Kelley joined the series as a writer in February 2025.

=== Casting ===
In July 2025, Christopher Meloni joined the series in a lead role, playing the head coach of an unnamed team. The following month, William H. Macy and Mandy Moore joined the series, with Moore reuniting with Fogelman after working with him in This Is Us.

In September 2025, Sam Corlett, Tanner Zagarino, Chloe Bennet, and Chace Crawford joined as series regulars.

In November 2025, Omar Epps, Michael McGrady, Calahan Skogman and Thomas Q. Jones joined the series in recurring roles. In March 2026, Bridget Moynahan and Benjamin Bratt were cast in recurring roles.

=== Filming ===
The series qualified for California's Film and TV Tax Credit Program. It was reported that the series got "the largest allocation" with nearly $43 million.

Filming for the series began on October 23, 2025. Scenes were filmed at the 2026 NFL draft in Pittsburgh.

== Release ==
In October 2026, Hulu announced that the series was scheduled to premiere on February 15, 2027.
