= Tumor (film) =

Upcoming film based on a graphic novel

- Directed by: Will Bridges
- Screenplay by: Cameron Alexander
- Based on: Tumor by Joshua Hale Fialkov and Noel Tuazon
- Produced by: Daniela Taplin Lundberg; Christopher Leggett
- Starring: Sam Rockwell; Maisy Stella; Esai Morales; Chris Messina; Michael Peña; Gigi Zumbado
- Production companies: Stay Gold Features; Delirio Films; Ryder Picture Company; 1846 Studios; Midnight Road Entertainment
- Country: United States
- Language: English

Tumor is an upcoming American psychological crime thriller film directed by Will Bridges, and based on the graphic novel of the same name by Joshua Hale Fialkov and Noel Tuazon. It stars Sam Rockwell, Maisy Stella, Esai Morales, Chris Messina, Michael Peña, and Gigi Zumbado.

== Premise ==
A private investigator suffering from a brain tumor is hired by a wealthy businessman to find his missing daughter.

== Cast ==
- Sam Rockwell as Frank Armstrong, a private investigator
- Maisy Stella as Evelyn, the missing daughter of Gibson
- Esai Morales as Gibson, a wealthy businessman and father of Evelyn
- Chris Messina
- Michael Peña
- Gigi Zumbado

== Production ==
The original graphic novel was first released to Kindle in 2009 before being published in February 2010. In October 2010, the film was announced to be in development at Red Crown Productions, a production company owned by Daniel Crown and Daniela Taplin Lundberg. They would team up with Barry Josephson to produce the film, while Samuel Bayer was attached to direct. No further development was made on this iteration.

In October 2025, a new version was proposed at AFM, with US sales handled by UTA Independent Film Group and WME Independent and international sales handled by AGC International. The film would be written and directed by Will Bridges, with Sam Rockwell and Maisy Stella starring. Taplin Lundberg would continue involvement, now producing through her new company Stay Gold Features. Filming took place in Los Angeles between February 17 to March 25, 2026. In April 2026, production had officially wrapped.
