= Bi-ray =

Japanese girl group

Be-ray
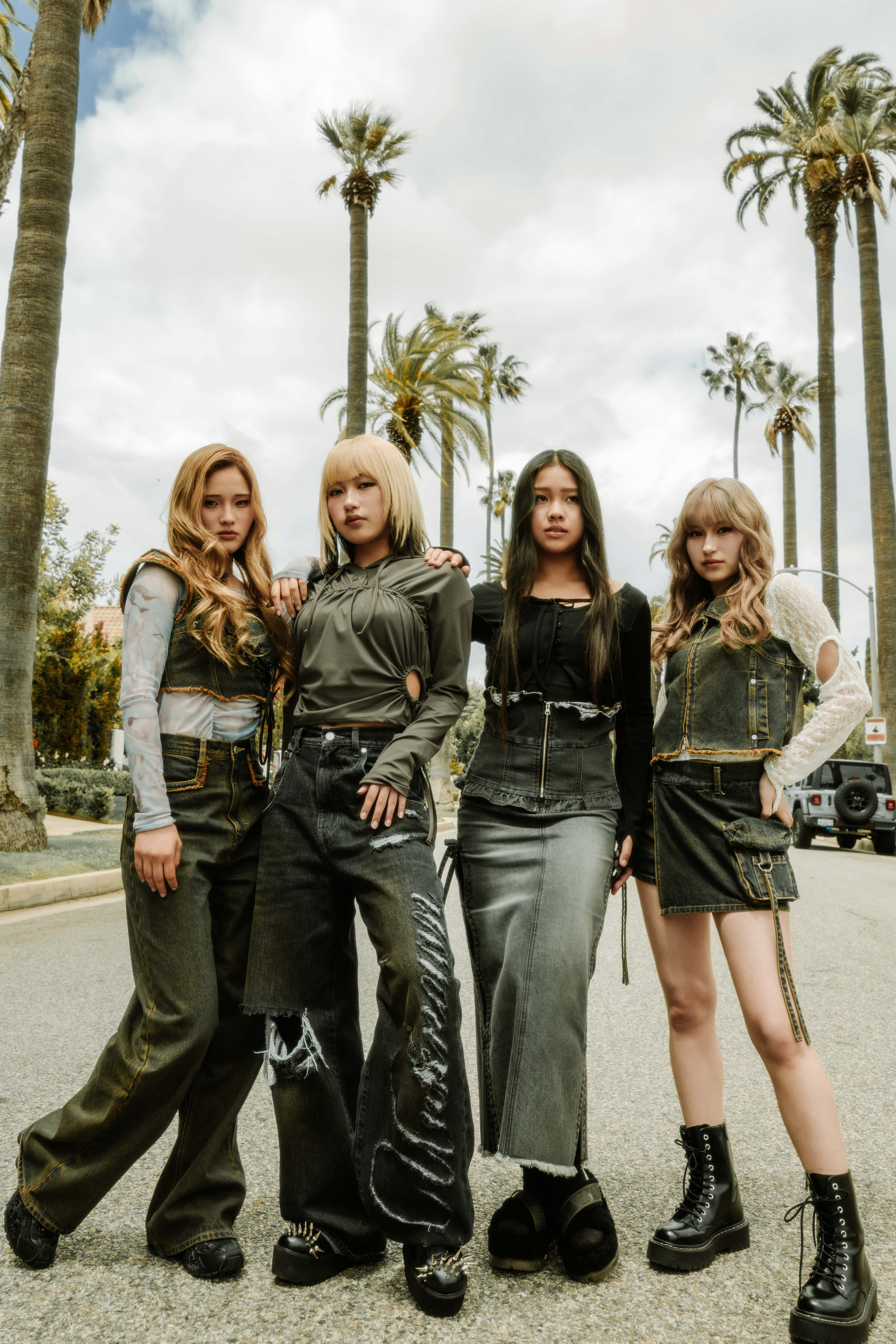
- Be-ray in Los Angeles, 2025

Background information
- Label: Melodee
- Members: Emi; Hinata; Cocomi; Michelle
- Website: be-ray-official.jp

Be-ray, formerly known as Bi–ray (stylized in Japanese as 美麗-Bi-ray-), is a four-member Japanese girl group produced by Yoshiki. The four-octave group was formed in 2024 with members Emi, Hinata, Cocomi, and Michelle.

== History ==
In 2023, the four members of Bi-ray - Cocomi, Emi, Michelle, and Hinata - competed in Nippon Television's "Kashō-ō (The Singing King)". Japanese rock star Yoshiki, who was a special judge for the program, decided to mentor the performers.

On July 6, 2024, Bi-ray made its first public appearance on Nippon Television's "The Music Day", performing a short version of the song "Butterfly", written and produced by Yoshiki.

In September 2024, the group performed at Yoshiki's annual dinner show event in Tokyo. In December, they performed on Nippon Television's "King of Singing - All Japan Singing Championship".

In May 2025, Bi-ray performed the U.S. national anthem at Dodger Stadium in Los Angeles.

In June 2025, "Butterfly" was announced as the group's first digital single and as the theme song for the film Bride Hard. The song reached #1 on the iTunes Pop, Recochoku, and Mora charts in Japan, and the music video, co-directed by Yoshiki, was released on June 20. On August 30, the group appeared at Yoshiki's sold-out "Evening/Breakfast with Yoshiki 2025 in Tokyo Japan Kurenai" and performed their next single, "Your Jealousy".

In September 2025, Bi-ray released the "Butterfly (Narrative Version)" music video directed by Yoshiki, which featured on-screen appearances by Rebel Wilson, Anna Camp, Colleen Camp, Gigi Zumbado, Da'Vine Joy Randolf, and Yoshiki. On the same day, the "Butterfly - Acoustic Version" digital single was released.

On October 16, 2025, Bi-ray was awarded the Next Generation Rising Star Award by the Japan America Society of Southern California. On March 4, 2026, the group released their second single, "Let You Go". The song's music video featured actors Yumia Fujisaki and Manato Sakamoto.

They announced the group's change of name to "Be–ray" on June 10, 2026, through their official site.

== Discography ==
=== Singles ===
Title	Details	Ranking	Details
"Butterfly"	Release date: June 20, 2025; Labels: Melodee Music (International); Avex (Japan); Format: digital single	#1 iTunes Japan Pop chart, Recochoku, Mora	Theme song for the film Bride Hard
"Butterfly - Acoustic Version"	Release date: September 5, 2025; Labels: Melodee Music (International); Avex (Japan); Format: digital single		Music video directed by Yoshiki
"Let You Go"	Release date: March 4, 2026; Label: Avex; Format: digital single		

== Members ==
- Emi (age 16)
- Hinata (age 15)
- Cocomi (age 14)
- Michelle (age 14)
