= Bridge and Tunnel (TV series) =

American comedy drama television series

- Genre: Comedy drama
- Created by: Edward Burns
- Written by: Edward Burns
- Directed by: Edward Burns
- Starring: Sam Vartholomeos; Caitlin Stasey; Gigi Zumbado; JanLuis Castellanos; Brian Muller; Edward Burns; Isabella Farrell; Erica Hernandez; Barrett Wilbert Weed
- Country of origin: United States
- Original language: English
- No. of seasons: 2
- No. of episodes: 12

Production
- Executive producers: Edward Burns; Aaron Lubin; Lori Keith Douglas; Michael Wright; Nancy Cotton
- Producer: Vincent Morano (season 2)
- Running time: 27–34 minutes
- Production companies: Marlboro Road Gang Productions; Epix Studios

Original release
- Network: Epix
- Release: January 24, 2021 – August 14, 2022

Bridge and Tunnel is an American comedy drama television series written, directed and produced by Edward Burns for Epix. The first season consists of 6 episodes and premiered on January 24, 2021. In July 2021, the series was renewed for a second season. In September 2022, the series was canceled after two seasons.

== Premise ==
Set in the early 1980s among the working class of Long Island, New York, six childhood friends have just graduated from college and are stepping out into the real world while also trying to hang on to the familiarity of their hometown and remaining years of their youth.

== Cast ==
- Sam Vartholomeos as Jimmy Farrell
- Caitlin Stasey as Jill Shore
- Gigi Zumbado as Tammy Ocampo
- JanLuis Castellanos as Mikey Diaz
- Brian Muller as Nick 'Pags' Pagnetti
- Edward Burns as Artie Farrell
- Isabella Farrell as Stacey Ross
- Erica Hernandez as Genie Farrell
- Barrett Wilbert Weed as Lizzie Pagnetti
- Rebecca Gibel as Kitty Farrell

== Episodes ==
=== Series overview ===
Season	Episodes	Originally released	
Season	Episodes	First released	Last released
1	6	January 24, 2021	February 28, 2021
2	6	July 17, 2022	August 14, 2022

=== Season 1 (2021) ===
No. overall	No. in season	Title	Directed by	Written by	Original release date
1	1	"The Graduates"	Edward Burns	Edward Burns	January 24, 2021
2	2	"Making up for Lost Time"	Edward Burns	Edward Burns	January 31, 2021
3	3	"A Perfect Couple"	Edward Burns	Edward Burns	February 7, 2021
4	4	"Just Friends"	Edward Burns	Edward Burns	February 14, 2021
5	5	"Today Is Your Birthday"	Edward Burns	Edward Burns	February 21, 2021
6	6	"The Swan Song"	Edward Burns	Edward Burns	February 28, 2021

=== Season 2 (2022) ===
No. overall	No. in season	Title	Directed by	Written by	Original release date
7	1	"Back Together Again"	Edward Burns	Edward Burns	July 10, 2022
8	2	"Breaking Up Is Hard To Do"	Edward Burns	Edward Burns	July 17, 2022
9	3	"She’s Gone"	Edward Burns	Edward Burns	July 24, 2022
10	4	"Dance the Night Away"	Edward Burns	Edward Burns	July 31, 2022
11	5	"Bloodshot Eyes"	Edward Burns	Edward Burns	August 7, 2022
12	6	"The Promise Land Six"	Edward Burns	Edward Burns	August 14, 2022

== Production ==
=== Development ===
On October 15, 2020, it was announced that Epix had given the production (originally titled Gibson Station) a series order for a first season consisting of six episodes. The series premiere on January 24, 2021. On July 14, 2021, Epix renewed the series for a second season. On September 28, 2022, Epix canceled the series after two seasons.

=== Casting ===
In October 2020 it was announced that the ensemble cast would include Sam Vartholomeos, Caitlin Stasey, Gigi Zumbado, JanLuis Castellanos, Brian Muller and Isabella Farrell. On December 2, 2020, Barrett Wilbert Weed joined the cast in a recurring role. On December 14, 2020, it was announced that Erica Hernandez had joined the cast in a recurring role.

== Reception ==
Writing for the AV Club, Danette Chavez gave the show a C rating, stating: "Bridge And Tunnel is stuck in neutral, hesitant to let its characters let go of a past that hardly seems worth revisiting."

The show holds a 29% on Rotten Tomatoes and a 52% on Metacritic, indicating mixed or average reviews.
