= Katherine Heiny =

American writer

- Katherine Heiny in 2017
- Born: 1968 (58 years)
- Education: University of Kansas
- Alma mater: Columbia University
- Occupation: Writer
- Notable work: Single, Carefree, Mellow; Standard Deviation; Early Morning Riser; Games and Rituals
- Spouse: Ian McCredie
- Children: 2
- Website: https://katherineheiny.com/

Katherine Heiny (born 1968) is an American writer. She has written two novels, Standard Deviation and Early Morning Riser, along with two books of short stories, essays and long-form journalism.

== Biography ==
Heiny was born in 1968 and is the youngest of three children. Her father was a chemical engineer and her mother was a chemist. She grew up in Midland, Michigan. She gained a degree in English from the University of Kansas, and then attended Columbia University and attained master's degrees in poetry and fiction.

Her Scottish husband, Ian McCredie, is a former MI6 agent and they have two sons. "He helps me with whatever I’m plotting," she said of her husband, "He’s really good at thinking about secrets and motives." Ben Macintyre's 2026 book Redwood describes how McCredie, then a young M16 agent, was dispatched to Tehran in 1981 where he recruited KGB officer Vladimir Kuzichkin who was willing to work as a double agent.

Heiny has lived in London and The Hague, and now lives in Maryland, United States.

== Career ==
In 1992, when she was 25, Heiny's short story 'How to Give the Wrong Impression' was published in The New Yorker after having been rejected 30 times. To support herself, she became a ghostwriter of around 25 YA novels, including for the Sweet Valley High series (as Francine Pascal) and for the Making Out series (as Katherine Applegate), before stopping writing to raise her family.

Heiny’s first short story collection, Single, Carefree, Mellow, was published in 2015. She was compared with writers Nora Ephron, John Cheever and Lorrie Moore.

Her first novel, Standard Deviation, published in 2017, is about a New York couple and their autistic ten-year-old son, and what happens when the husband’s ex-wife comes back on the scene. The novel is described as a comedy of manners rather than being plot-driven. Kirkus Reviews said the novel explores marriage, fidelity, friendship and parenting, and describes it as: “An amusingly engaging take on long-term marriage with a lovably loopy character at its center.”

Her second novel, Early Morning Riser, published in 2021, features a teacher who moves to a small town, and her relationships over two decades. It was described by The Spectator as a laidback meditation on everyday life featuring the female protagonist’s interior world: “raucously funny, but what sustains it is an ability to flip seamlessly from farce to tender emotional reckonings”.

Her second short story collection, Games and Rituals, was published in 2023. It was described in The Guardian as “highly crafted stories of quiet suburban despair that are also genuinely funny”.

Heiny has commented: “I just like to write about sex and relationships, and that ends up being about infidelity a lot”. She says she takes inspiration from comic encounters with strangers.

Heiny's fiction has been published in The New Yorker, The Atlantic, Ploughshares, Glimmer Train, and other places. She also writes essays and long-form journalism.

== Works ==
=== Novels ===
- Standard Deviation, London : 4th Estate (2017)
- Early Morning Riser, London : 4th Estate (2021)

=== Story collections ===
- Single, Carefree, Mellow, New York : Alfred A. Knopf (2015)
- Games and Rituals, London : 4th Estate (2023)
