= Vernon Wells =

Vernon Wells may refer to:

- Vernon Wells (baseball) (born 1978), American baseball player
- Vernon Wells (actor) (born 1945), Australian actor
- Vernon Wells (Neighbours), a character on the soap opera Neighbours
