= List of Australian films of 2016 =

This is a list of Australian films released in 2016.

== 2016 ==
Title	Director	Cast (subject of documentary)	Genre	Notes	Release date
Alex & Eve	Peter Andrikidis	Andrea Demetriades, Richard Brancatisano	Comedy, romance		22 October
Arrowhead	Jesse O'Brien	Dan Mor, Aleisha Rose Groth	Sci-fi		10 June
Backtrack	Michael Petroni	Adrien Brody, Sam Neill, Robin McLeavy	Mystery, thriller		16 June
Boys in the Trees	Nicholas Verso	Toby Wallace, Gulliver McGrath, Mitzi Ruhlmann, Justin Holborow	Fantasy, drama		20 October
The Daughter	Simon Stone	Geoffrey Rush, Miranda Otto, Odessa Young	Drama	Based on the play The Wild Duck by Henrik Ibsen	17 March
Down Under	Abe Forsythe	Lincoln Younes, Rahel Romahn, Michael Denkha	Comedy		11 August
Downriver	Grant Scicluna	Reef Ireland, Kerry Fox, Robert Taylor	Drama		16 June
Emo the Musical	Neil Triffett	Benson Jack Anthony, Jordan Hare	Musical, comedy		1 August
Girl Asleep	Rosemary Myers	Bethany Whitmore, Harrison Feldman, Matthew Whittet	Drama		
Goldstone	Ivan Sen	David Wenham, Aaron Pedersen, Jacki Weaver	Thriller	Sequel to Mystery Road	8 June
Hacksaw Ridge	Mel Gibson	Andrew Garfield, Sam Worthington	Biographical war film		4 September
Joe Cinque's Consolation	Sotiris Dounoukos	Maggie Naouri, Jerome Meyer	Drama, true crime		30 July
The Legend of Ben Hall	Matthew Holmes	Jack Martin, Jamie Coffa, William Lee	Drama, action	Based on the true story of bushranger Ben Hall	5 December
Lion	Garth Davis	Rooney Mara, Nicole Kidman, Dev Patel, David Wenham	Drama	Based on the book A Long Way Home by Saroo Brierley	25 November
Looking for Grace	Sue Brooks	Radha Mitchell, Richard Roxburgh, Odessa Young	Drama		26 January
A Month of Sundays	Matthew Saville	Anthony LaPaglia, John Clarke, Julia Blake	Comedy		28 April
Nowhere Boys: The Book of Shadows	David Caesar	Rahart Adams, Dougie Baldwin, Joel Lok, Matt Testro	Sci-fi, fantasy	Based on the television series Nowhere Boys by Tony Ayers	1 January
Pawno	Paul Ireland	John Brumpton, Maeve Dermody, Kerry Armstrong	Drama, romance		21 April
Red Billabong	Luke Sparke	Dan Ewing, Tim Pocock, Jessica Green	Thriller	Pinnacle Films	25 August
Red Dog: True Blue	Kriv Stenders	Jason Isaacs, Levi Miller	Family	Prequel to Red Dog, Woss Group Film Productions	26 December
Restoration	Stuart Willis	Craig McLachlan, Grant Cartwright, Stephen Carracher, Nadia Townsend, Rosie Lourde	Sci-fi, thriller	Midnight Snack Productions	8 September
Scare Campaign	Cameron & Colin Cairns	Meegan Warner, Ian Meadows, Olivia DeJonge	Horror		26 November
Servant or Slave	Steven McGregor	Rita Wenberg, Rita Wright, Violet West, Valerie Linow, Adelaide Wenberg	Documentary	No Coincidence Media	1 August
Sheborg Massacre	Daniel Armstrong	Daisy Masterman, Whitney Duff, Emma-Louise Wilson	Neo-pulp		10 January
Sherpa	Jennifer Peedom	Documentary about the work done by Sherpas as mountain guides on Everest	Documentary		31 March
Spin Out	Tim Ferguson, Marc Gracie	Xavier Samuel, Morgan Griffin, Eddie Baroo	Romance, comedy		15 September
Teenage Kicks	Craig Boreham	Miles Szanto, Daniel Webber, Shari Sebbens, Charlotte Best	Drama		11 June
Top Knot Detective	Aaron McCann & Dominic Pearce	Masa Yamaguchi, Toshi Okuzaki	Mockumentary, comedy		28 September
