= Nicola Parry =

Australian actress

Nicola Parry is an Australian actress who is best known for her roles in the hit comedies Thank God You're Here, The Hollowmen and Swift and Shift Couriers. She is an alumna of the London Academy of Music and Dramatic Art. She also appeared as a regular cast member of The Time of Our Lives in the ABC1 miniseries Sleuth 101, and on the Australian TV comedy show How Not To Behave.

== Filmography ==
Year	Title	Role	Notes	Ref
2023	Wellmania	Diane	2 episodes	
2021	Born to Spy	Ms Kelly	1 episode	
2020	Teenage Rangers	Smoothie Time Manager		
2019	Frayed	Diane	2 episodes	
2019	Part-time Private Eyes	Alex	TV series	
2018	Street Smart	Detective Delaney	TV Series	
2017	Resting Pitch Face	June	TV series	
2017	The Letdown	Mum	TV Series	
2016-2018	Rake	Ellie Stepper	2 episodes	
2016	Here Come the Habibs	Karen	1 Episode	
2015	How Not to Behave	Ensemble Cast	15 episodes	
2013-2014	The Time of Our Lives	Andrea	6 episodes	
2012	The Mystery of a Hansom Cab	Julia Featherweight	TV movie	
2012	Any Questions for Ben?	Make-up Girl	Film	
2011	Some Say Love	Various	TV Series	
2010	The Librarians	Beverly	2 episodes	
2010	Sleuth 101	Ally/Stacy	Mini-Series, 2 episodes	
2008	Swift and Shift Couriers	Karen Smythe	12 episodes	
2008	The Hollowmen	Holly	12 episodes	
2006-2009, 2023-	Thank God You're Here	Ensemble Cast	TV series	
