= Tarnation =

Tarnation may refer to:

- A Minced oath for damnation, associated with Cowboy stock characters
- Tarnation (band), a San Francisco-based alt-country-goth band
- Tarnation (2003 film), a 2003 documentary film by Jonathan Caouette
- Tarnation (2017 film), a 2017 Australian horror film by Daniel Armstrong
