= Daniel Armstrong =

Daniel Armstrong may refer to:

- Daniel Armstrong (film director) (born 1971), Australian film director
- Daniel W. Armstrong (born 1949), American analytical chemist
- Daniel Armstrong (footballer, born 1997), Scottish footballer for Kilmarnock
- Daniel Armstrong (footballer, born 2005), Finnish footballer for Atalanta
- Dan Armstrong (1934–2004), American guitarist, luthier, and session musician
