= Sleuth 101 =

Australian television program

- Created by: Anthony Watt; Bruce Kane
- Written by: Anthony Watt; Brendan Luno
- Directed by: Jon Olb
- Presented by: Cal Wilson
- Country of origin: Australia
- No. of seasons: 1
- No. of episodes: 8

Production
- Running time: approx 30 minutes

Original release
- Network: ABC1
- Release: 12 February – 11 April 2010

Sleuth 101 is an Australian comedy "improvisatory whodunit game show" television series, broadcast on ABC1 in 2010.

== Synopsis ==
The series revolved around a murder-mystery to be solved by a celebrity guest detective. Each episode featured a guest detective (usually a comedian), four suspects, a crime scene, evidence and witness accounts – just like real detective work. The show was hosted by comedian Cal Wilson, who occasionally gave subtle hints about the crime. Each week, the guest detective was required to solve the murder using the evidence. There were some similarities to 1970s British series Whodunnit!, 1990s Australian television game show Cluedo, and 2010s British series Armchair Detectives. A second season was negotiated by the ABC, but was later cancelled.

== Conception ==
Sleuth 101 was created by series producer Anthony Watt and executive producer Bruce Kane, the team behind Spicks and Specks, for Mayhem TV. Noticing the emergence of similar programs, featuring panels of people seated, they realised there was a market for something more physical.

Taking the 'whodunit' concept, they incorporated a scripted narrative and an element of improvisation and turned it into a game show, using comedians to solve the crime. Aiming for a multi-generational demographic, their vision was to modernise the whodunit concept by incorporating elements of forensic science, but keeping it PG rated, by adopting a comedic tone, despite dealing with serious topics. Watt said "We’ve thrown in twists, turns, clues, red herrings and the best comic talent this country has seen. It’s ruthless, cold-blooded murder with jokes. Solve the crime or just kick back and laugh. Or both".

Cal Wilson auditioned for the role of host, while presenting a youth magazine show called The Drum in New Zealand. ABC's Amanda Duthie said, "We’re delighted to have Cal Wilson host Sleuth 101. She’s funny, smart and surprising and will be the perfect guide for these weekly tales of crime".

== Filming and writing ==
Filming began on 21 September 2009 in Melbourne, and featured both on-location and studio sets. The series took nine weeks to shoot, with two sets of two-day location shoots each week, followed by studio days the following week. Each episode took an average of three days to shoot. Dale Mark's art department was in charge of the creation (on location) and recreation (in the live studio) of the murder scenes. All sets were interior, in order to match the location in the studio.

The series' main writer was comedian Matt Parkinson, though Wilson was "given licence to tweak the script", adding gags along the way. Watt and Brendan Luno wrote the scripted segments over 16 weeks. Each episode presented a self-contained story, including a MasterChef parody, a recording studio, a gym, and an office. Wilson wrote some alliteration summaries for the shows.

ARIA Award-winning designer Mark Denning gave the ABC permission to use the award as a 'weapon' in the second episode of the show.

== Improvisation ==
Kane endeavoured to prevent the show becoming a "series of gags", insisting the comedy had to be relevant to the plot and feel of the show. Watt said "The value is that you get to see people improvising. When you put comedians under pressure, trying to solve a crime, they come up with fantastic jokes".

Wilson noted that it didn't matter if 'guest detectives' were correct or not, as it would be funny regardless. If they got stuck, she would give them leading clues such as "that piece of paper you picked up looks interesting". In one instance, Frank Woodley struggled to find clues, so she resorted to using a hotter/colder system to guide him. Commenting on watching fellow comedians in an unfamiliar, pressured situation Wilson said:

They were all pretty good at making stuff up. It was also lovely seeing people that I have absolute faith in comedy-wise just swim a bit harder because they were doing something that was outside their comfort zones. They all came up to me afterwards and said, 'Oh my god, that was really scary!' because they were doing two things: they were being funny and they were trying to solve a problem, so they were using double the brainpower. Some of them flew and other people fell over but it was great fun.

== Run ==
In September 2009, it was announced that the ABC had commissioned 8 half-hour episodes of the unscripted show.

In March 2010, the series moved to 6:30pm on Sundays.

In early 2010, Kane told the magazine Encore that ABC saw the series as a "highly 'formattable', sellable product." Though ABC had traditionally not used franchise-creating as a business strategy, Kane insisted that there was no reluctance from them to do it, but that they had never done it in a commercial sense. Plans ultimately fell through.

A second season was originally planned, but it was cancelled due to low viewing figures of the show.

The series is available on ITunes as of 2019.

== Format ==
After the guest detective was introduced, they watched prerecorded footage of the murder taking place and the introduction of the four suspects. They were then guided to a mock-up of the crime scene, where they scoured for clues, which were then 'sent to the lab' by Wilson. After listening to the witness' accounts, the detective interrogated them.

Wilson then intercepted, with 'lab results' from the clues the detective found. All four suspects were interrogated, before the detective attempted to solve the crime, after which, Wilson revealed the clues, before the show ended. The game had no script, relying purely on witness statements, footage flashback and forensic evidence.

== Guest cast ==
- Dave O'Neil as Detective O'Neill
- John Wood
- Nicola Parry as Ally
- Robyn Butler as Michelle
- Dave Lawson as Steve
- Denise Drysdale as Marjorie
- Frank Woodley as Detective Woodley
- Celia Pacquola as Abby
- Leah Vandenberg as Jessica / Annie
- Frankie J Holden as Kyle
- Kevin Harrington as Barry
- Nicholas Bell as Ian
- Claire Hooper as Detective Hooper
- Samuel Johnson as Cache
- Tommy Dassalo as Torben
- Katrina Milosevic as Gill
- Emily Taheny as Hermione
- Nazeem Hussain as Nazeem
- Adam Richard as Detective Richard
- Caroline Craig as Bridget
- Kate Atkinson as Jacqui,
- Anne Phelan as Pat
- Jacqueline Brennan as Louise
- Peter Rowsthorn as Detective Rowsthorn
- Nicola Parry as Stacy
- Denise Scott as Enid
- Tony Rickards as Fingers
- Mark Mitchell as Ramsay
- Steve Bastoni as Harry
- Julia Morris as Detective Morris
- Toby Truslove as Nigel
- Kimberley Davies as Rachel
- Paul McCarthy as Johnny
- Colette Mann as Ann
- Felicity Ward as Judy
- Colin Lane as Detective Lane
- Francis Greenslade as Mick
- Nick Russell as Cary
- Emily Taheny as Rebecca
- Blair McDonough as Dan
- Alan Brough as Robby
- Hamish Blake as Detective Blake
- Heidi Arena as Nikki, posing as Bea
- Tracy Harvey as Jean
- Nick Farnell as Duncan
- Nicholas Bell as Ern
- Luke Ryan as the policeman
- Annalise Braakensiek as Bea

== Episodes ==
No.	Title	Directed by	Written by	Original release date
1	"Dave O'Neil in Family Assorted"	Jon Olb	Anthony Watt & Brendan Luno	12 February 2010
Bill Quinn didn't get sudoku books, power tools or even socks and jocks this year for Christmas. Instead, he was killed. Suffocated, precisely. With the pillow he was using to make his Santa suit a bit more "tummylicious". Enter, guest detective Dave O'Neil. An examination of the crime scene turns up a wombat farming prospectus, an empty glass of eggnog and a chocolate menu. Not much to go by, so Detective O'Neil decides to interrogate Bill's wife Marjorie, daughter Michelle, son Steve and daughter-in-law Ally. As it turns out, this doesn't help Dave in the slightest when the time comes to pinpoint the murderer - so using some crazy logic (that the most famous guest star is always the murderer), Dave accuses Marjorie as the killer...and, crazy though it sounds, he's right. Starring: Dave O'Neil as the detective, John Wood as Bill, Nicola Parry as Ally, Robyn Butler as Michelle, Dave Lawson as Steve and Denise Drysdale as Marjorie.
2	"Frank Woodley in Murder in a Sharp"	Jon Olb	Anthony Watt & Brendan Luno	19 February 2010
Kyle Bowman is a rock god. He's got all the mannerisms of your typical rockstar: arrogance, an affair, and an ARIA stabbed through his body in his recording studio. Time for Frank Woodley to step in and solve the murder. With a scrap of paper, a mobile phone and an oversized earring presenting themselves at the crime scene, Frank steps into the interrogation room to meet Kyle's third wife Abby, record sales rep Jessica, personal bodyguard Ian and his bandmate Barry. With this, the earring turns out to belong to Abby, an affair with Lily Allen comes to light and plane tickets to Samoa are found. Not a whole lot to go by, but Frank has to pinpoint the killer, using crazy logic (again). Detective Woodley picks out bodyguard Ian as the killer, because he is the least likely, therefore the most likely. And just like Detective O'Neil, the logic prevails. Time for a scorecheck - crazy logic: 2, common sense: zero. Starring: Frank Woodley as the detective, Celia Pacquola as Abby, Leah Vandenberg as Jessica, Frankie J Holden as Kyle, Kevin Harrington as Barry and Nicholas Bell as Ian.
3	"Claire Hooper in Delete Cache"	Jon Olb	Anthony Watt & Brendan Luno	26 February 2010
Gamers go nuts! Deletion strikes gaming company system administrator Cache, or Darren Gablonsky, collapses dead after drinking his regular black coffee. But which of his nerdy colleagues slipped away from Halo online for enough time to poison Cache? Luckily, detective Claire Hooper is on hand to solve the crime. The crime scene presents a small stick-it note, a half-eaten doughnut, a coffee mug and a biro pen, which should be enough to guide Detective Hooper, right? Wrong. Interrogations with the game lab's CEO Torben, designer Hermione, technical director Nazeem and accountant Gill may give Claire some hints, and it's time to show them. Maybe a possible online affair? Maybe a virus in a famous computer game? Or maybe a firing gone too far? Claire pinpoints Cache's girlfriend Hermione as the killer, with her motive being Cache cheating on her - sleeping with another game character. And Detective Hooper is correct - will the Sleuth 101 team ever get one up on these detectives? Starring: Claire Hooper as the detective, Samuel Johnson as Cache, Tommy Dassalo as Torben, Katrina Milosevic as Gill, Emily Taheny as Hermione and Nazeem Hussain as Nazeem.
4	"A Tan To Die For starring Adam Richard"	Jon Olb	Anthony Watt & Brendan Luno	5 March 2010
Not many people die in a beauty salon. Even fewer die in a beauty salon on the eve of the happiest day of their lives. But unfortunately, Bridget Wilmott is one of them. She was crushed to death in the solarium she was using to make herself picture-perfect for her special day. But unfortunately for guest detective Adam Richard, there is no shortage of people who wanted to see Bridget dead - but which was it? The mother-in-law-to-be Pat, the maid of honour Jacqui, the hairdresser Annie or the salon owner Louise? When Detective Richard discovers a disposable camera, some screws, hydraulic fluid and some hair follicles, it seems like the case may be wrapped up pretty quickly - wrong. When it comes time to bring the murderer to justice, Detective Richard glosses over Annie's past relationship with Bridget's fiancee, giving her the motive, and takes her photographic alibi (which turns out to be bogus) to heart, giving her the opportunity. Detective Richard highlights Louise as the killer, but he's wrong. Starring: Adam Richard as the detective, Leah Vandenberg as Annie, Caroline Craig as Bridget, Kate Atkinson as Jacqui, Anne Phelan as Pat and Jacqueline Brennan as Louise.
5	"Peter Rowsthorn in Inside Chef"	Jon Olb	Anthony Watt & Brendan Luno	12 March 2010
Really, celebrity chef Ramsay McGordon should've seen it coming. Judging a cooking program where the contestants are all convicted felons does not spell job of a lifetime. Rather, in Ramsay's case, it spells death. He keels over after tasting the final dish in the final of his popular cooking show. With such a crooked cast of cooks, detective Peter Rowsthorn has a tough one to crack. Examining the crime scene turns up a (unopened) vial of poison worn by the victim, a syringe, a USB key and two peas. And interrogations of the show's producer Stacy, convicted pickpocket Fingers, convicted hitman Harry and convicted poisoner Enid also yield no discernible results. So Detective Rowsthorn may have to resort to guesswork. What is it, 25% chance? That's enough, as Detective Rowsthorn picks Stacy as the killer, trying to stop McGordon reporting their affair to the media. Detectives: 4, Sleuth 101: 1. Starring Peter Rowsthorn as the detective, Nicola Parry as Stacy, Denise Scott as Enid, Tony Rickards as Fingers, Mark Mitchell as Ramsay and Steve Bastoni as Harry.
6	"Late And Live starring Julia Morris"	Jon Olb	Anthony Watt & Brendan Luno	26 March 2010
Breaking news! The news reporter for radio station Noyz FM, Rachel Timms, has been murdered! A promising career for Timms was cut brutally short by a microphone cable, just before she was due to read the midnight Noyz Newz. It's the biggest story of the year...too bad she won't be reporting it. Guest detective Julia Morris has been thrown into the graveyard shift for this one...will the late hour faze our detective? Searching Timms' radio booth finds a speeding infringement notice, a water bottle, a news bulletin, some lozenge wrappers and a piece of "fluff". This leads to interrogations of the radio host, Johnny, the show manager Ann, the tech-head Nigel and the guest comedienne Judy. This means...nothing. Or does it? Maybe it means an accusation of Rachel's stalker, Nigel, from Detective Morris. However, she's wrong, for it was host Johnny Velvet who strangled Timms overe envy for a new TV position. Sleuth 101, 2, guest detectives, 4. Starring Julia Morris as the detective, Toby Truslove as Nigel, Kimberley Davies as Rachel, Paul McCarthy as Johnny, Colette Mann as Ann and Felicity Ward as Judy.
7	"Colin Lane in Performance Enhancing Death"	Jon Olb	Anthony Watt & Brendan Luno	4 April 2010
Dan Kinsman. The Sleuth 101 equivalent of Ben Cousins. Reformed bad boy, been off the drugs for a while now. He's got a new team, the Western Dragons, and a new lease on life. Or so he did, until a tricked-up treadmill shocked him - literally. To solve this one, Detective Colin Lane will need to be paying attention. And at first, he does - he finds a journalist's business card, an envelope of photos, a bottle of Vitamin B pills and a piece of red wire. And when he interrogates Dan's coach Mick, his teammate Cary, his manager Robby and Cary's girl, Rebecca, he claims to have it all sorted out. Apparently, Cary killed him because Dan was in the way of Cary making it big in the footy world, and because he was having an affair with Rebecca. Ding! Correct. Starring Colin Lane as the detective, Francis Greenslade as Mick, Nick Russell as Cary, Emily Taheny as Rebecca, Blair McDonough as Dan and Alan Brough as Robby.
8	"Still Life starring Hamish Blake"	Jon Olb	Anthony Watt & Brendan Luno	11 April 2010
Imagine this. A simple life-drawing class turns into a murder scene. The beautiful nude model turns out to be a wanted criminal, but by the time the cops get to the scene, she's already dead. Stabbed in the neck. Hamish Blake steps up to solve the crime, but spends a little too much time staring at the deceased's naked body. When he finally gets down to it, he finds two palette knives, a red spill, and a bank statement belonging to Nikki Gleason, the victim, and interrogates nun-turned-art-teacher Bea, married couple Ern and Jean, and art enthusiast/"sicko" Duncan. Detective Blake then discovers that Gleason was partly responsible for the murder and theft of Ern and Jean's son, and pins the murder on them. However, the old "switcheroo" trips him up: apparently, Bea O'Malley, the nun-turned-artist, is currently lying in the morgue, and Nikki Gleason, posed as an art student, stabbed O'Malley and took her identity before the cops arrived, after Bea's call to the cops, claiming that Nikki was on the premises. So, in the end: Sleuth 101: 3, detectives: 5. Starring: Hamish Blake as the detective, Heidi Arena as Nikki, posing as Bea, Tracy Harvey as Jean, Nick Farnell as Duncan, Nicholas Bell as Ern, Luke Ryan as the policeman and Annalise Braakensiek as Bea.

== Critical reception ==
Upon the series' debut, The Sydney Morning Herald wrote that "Wilson exudes...good-natured charm and quick wit" and "even gets away with such daggy to-camera spiels". By the series' end, the newspaper concluded "What seemed both a promising idea and a rather delightful nod to two genre predecessors – the 1970s mystery show Whodunit? and the 1990s board game spin-off Cluedo – seems to stumble and fall in the execution. It is one thing to try to reinvent a genre after two fairly excellent executions but to live up to neither, with the benefit of significantly higher production values than both, is a terrible shame. Sleuth 101 is sold as a murder mystery but, in practice, it's a poor cousin to Thank God You're Here. It's jam-packed with familiar faces but the range of performances – from buffoonish to solid but unremarkable – lets it down".

In a letter entitled "Case of the stolen timeslot", Ray Harrison wrote the following letter to The Age: "WHY all the whingeing about Sleuth 101? The description by Cindy Mann (Letters, 18/3) is correct. Collectors is OK but Sleuth 101 deserves far better than being buried on Sunday." The rarity of a woman heading the programme was remarked upon in New Zealand press, who put it down to her previous role in Thank God You're Here. The newspaper wrote "Host Cal Wilson is witty and charming but unless her celebrity guests come up with some snappy improvisation, the show falls flat."

The Sydney Morning Herald wrote that the show "seems to stumble and fall in the execution". The Age deemed it a "new twist on a very, very old [series], though noted that the actors were "excellent" and were enjoying themselves. The newspaper felt the show managed to subvert some of the "ludicrous crime series conventions" such as the suspect interview and crime scene inspection. In another article it wrote that similar to the show's commercial cousin, Thank God You're Here, Sleuth 101 lives and dies by the strength of its celebrity guests. The paper also said the "promising" show "seems to stumble and fall in the execution".

== Interactive game ==
On the Sleuth 101 website, an interactive murder mystery game tie-in was created, in which players had to solve 8 cases. The game is now inactive, though used to be located here. Each case had a different motive, and ranged from a retirement home, to a circus, to a church, to a book signing. Successfully solving the case gave the player clues for the upcoming episode of Sleuth 101. The site was a finalist at the 2010 ATOM Awards in the Best Multimedia category. It was also a finalist at the 17th AIMIA Awards in the Best Entertainment category. The Australian deemed it a piece of "clever light entertainment".

== Home releases ==
Season	Date Released	# Of Episodes	# Of Discs	Special Features	Classification
Season 1	1 April 2010	8	1	None	PG – violence, drug references, coarse language
