= David James (actor, born 1967) =

Australian actor, born 1967

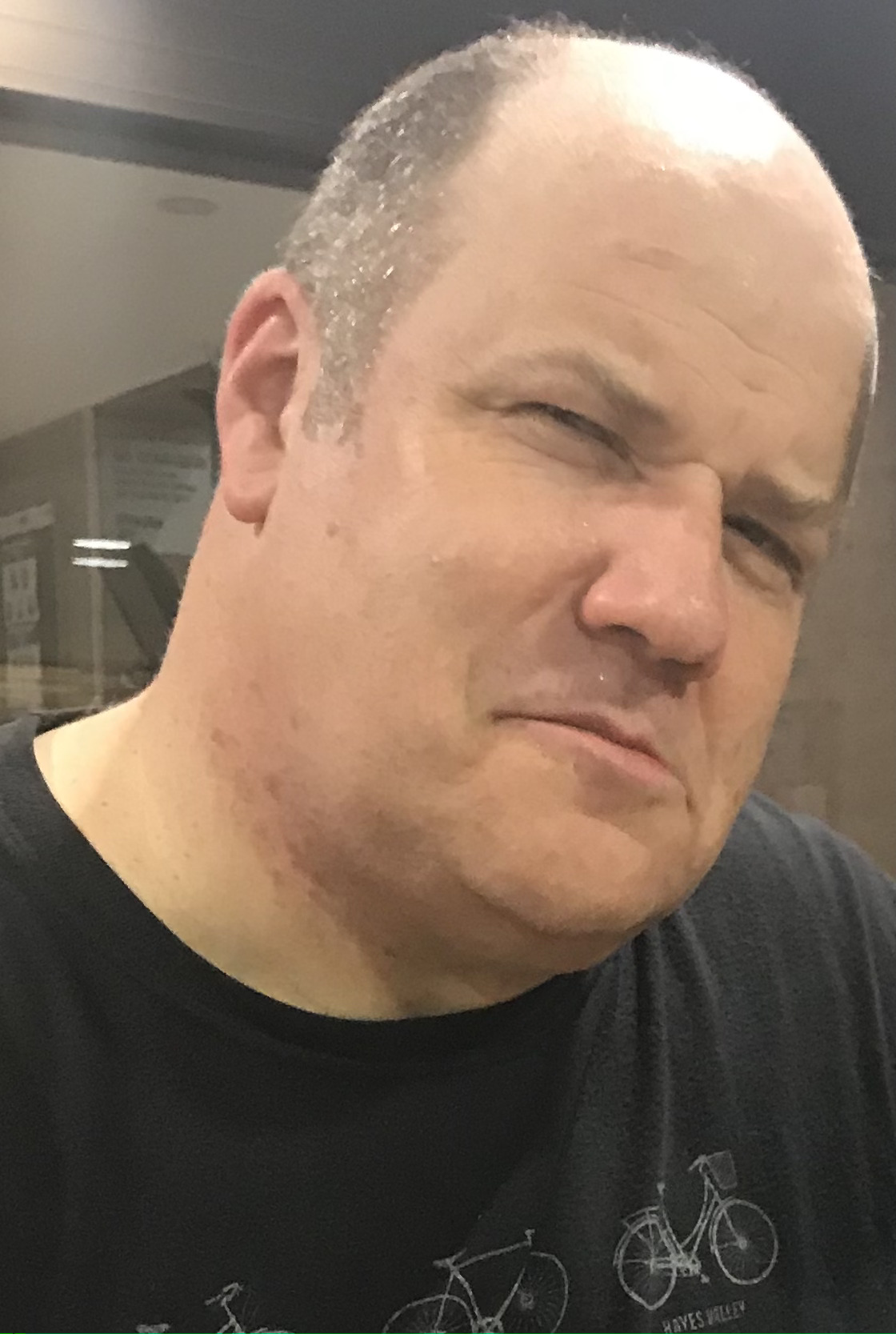
- James in October 2019
- Born: 1967 (age 58–59)
- Occupation: Actor
- Years active: 1991–present
- Known for: Play School (1993–2000); The Hollowmen (2008)

David James (born 1967) is an Australian television and film actor based in Melbourne.

== Career ==
James is best known for his long-running role as a presenter on ABC TV's children's program Play School, a role he started in 1993 and worked in until 2000. James also had minor roles in such Australian TV series as City Homicide, Very Small Business, All Saints, Water Rats, G.P., and Police Rescue over an extended period. In 2008 James gained a leading support role in Working Dog Productions satirical political television series The Hollowmen, where he played the part of Phillip, Secretary of the Department of the Prime Minister and Cabinet.

James has appeared on television commercials, worked with Play School co-presenter Benita Collings on live Play School Concerts, and performed in live theatre. In 2009 he took a starring role in the Australian production of Avenue Q, a stage musical he described as "Sesame Street meets South Park on acid".

James had a significant supporting role in the 2012 Australian comedy film Any Questions for Ben?, created by Working Dog Productions, where he played Malcolm, the lead character's boss.

James won a Logie at the 2009 Logie Awards for "Most Outstanding Comedy Program" as part of the cast of The Hollowmen.

== Filmography ==
=== Television appearances ===
| Year | Title | Role | Notes |
|---|---|---|---|
| 2023 | Plausible Deniability | Bruce Pickens | TV miniseries; 2 episodes |
| 2021 | Why are you like this? | Mike | 1 episode |
| 2020 | Discover Indie Film | Simon | 1 episode |
| 2018-17 | True Story with Hamish & Andy | Graham / Clive's Dad | 2 episodes |
| 2018 | Jack Irish | Denis | 2 episodes |
| 2018 | Olivia Newton-John: Hopelessly Devoted to You | Allan Carr | 1 episode |
| 2016 | Offspring (TV series) | Benedict Clegg | 1 episode |
| 2015 | Miss Fisher's Murder Mysteries | Quentin Tode | 1 episode |
| 2012 | Howzat! Kerry Packer's War | Max Nielson | 1 episode |
| 2009 | City Homicide | Ian Chalmers | 1 episode |
| 2009 | Chandon Pictures | Benji | 1 episode |
| 2008 | The Hollowmen | Phillip | 12 episodes |
| 2008 | Very Small Business | Sol Dolman | 2 episodes |
| 2008-01 | All Saints (TV series) | Richard / Karl | 2 episodes |
| 2003 | The Postcard Bandit | Drown | TV Movie |
| 2002 | BackBerner | Labor MP | 1 episode |
| 1998 | Water Rats | Neville | 1 episode |
| 1994 | G.P | Hugh Mcintosh | 1 episode |
| 1992 | Police Rescue | Oliver | 1 episode |
| 1991 | The Flying Doctors | Hugh Conway | 1 episode |

=== Film appearances ===
| Year | Title | Role | Notes |
|---|---|---|---|
| 2019 | The Whistleblower | Newsreader | |
| 2018 | Your Call is Important to Us | Simon | Short |
| 2012 | Bridge of Names | David Henry | |
| 2012 | Any Questions for Ben?` | Malcolm | |
| 2012 | Fish and Chips | Bastien | Short |
| 2007 | My Greatest Day Ever | Dad | Short |
| 2003 | The Rage in Placid Lake | Lloyd | |
| 1997 | Prick | | Short |
| 1996 | Justine In the Heat of Passion | Hooded Lover #1 | |
| 1996 | Justine Seduction of Innocence | Hooded Lover #1 | |
| 1995 | Justine Wild Nights | Hooded Lover #1 | |
