= Utopia (Australian TV series) =

Australian comedy television series

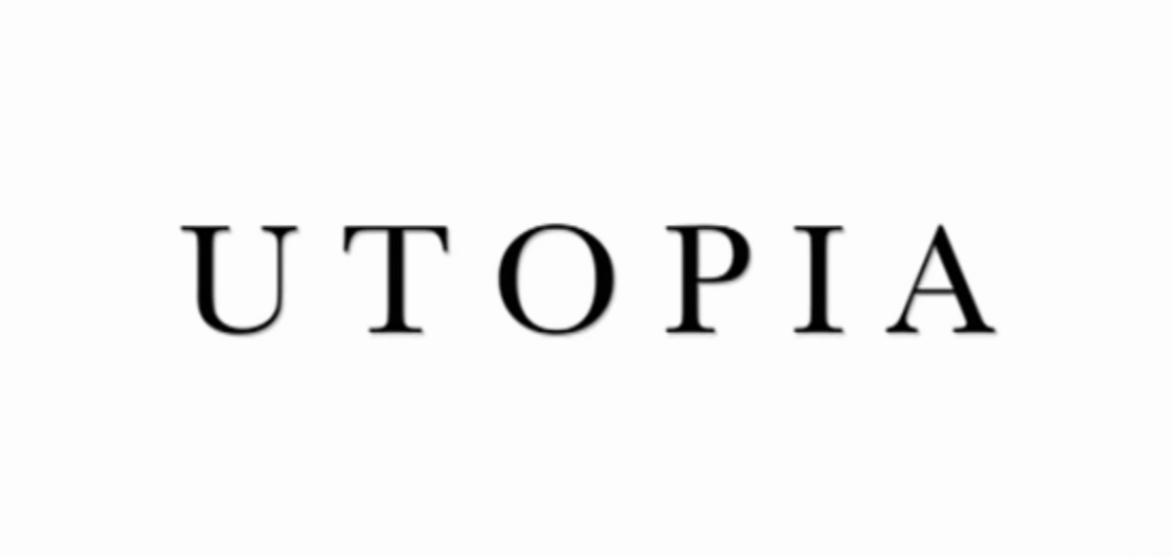
- Also known as: Dreamland (US)
- Genre: Comedy; Political satire
- Created by: Rob Sitch; Santo Cilauro; Tom Gleisner
- Written by: Rob Sitch; Santo Cilauro; Tom Gleisner
- Directed by: Rob Sitch
- Starring: Rob Sitch; Anthony Lehmann; Celia Pacquola; Dave Lawson; Kitty Flanagan; Emma-Louise Wilson; Luke McGregor; Michelle Lim Davidson; Toby Truslove; Dilruk Jayasinha; Nina Oyama
- Country of origin: Australia
- Original language: English
- No. of series: 5
- No. of episodes: 40

Production
- Executive producer: Michael Hirsh
- Producers: Rob Sitch; Santo Cilauro; Tom Gleisner
- Production locations: Orica House, Melbourne; Victorian School Building Authority, Melbourne
- Production company: Working Dog Productions

Original release
- Network: ABC
- Release: 13 August 2014 – 26 July 2023

Utopia, internationally titled Dreamland, is an Australian television comedy series by Working Dog Productions that premiered on the ABC on 13 August 2014. The series follows the working lives of a team in the fictional Nation Building Authority, a newly created government organisation. The authority is responsible for overseeing major infrastructure projects, from announcement to unveiling. The series explores the collision between bureaucracy and grand ambitions. The second series aired in 2015, beginning with the first episode on 19 August 2015. The third series aired in 2017, beginning with the first episode on 19 July 2017. The fourth series aired in 2019, beginning on 21 August 2019. A fifth series aired from 7 June 2023.

== Plot ==
The series is set inside the offices of the fictional Nation Building Authority, a newly created government organisation responsible for overseeing major infrastructure projects ranging from new roads and rail lines to airports and high rise urban developments. It follows the working lives of a tight-knit team of bureaucrats in charge of guiding big building schemes from announcement to unveiling. Throughout the series grand projects are frustrated by self-interest, publicity stunts, constant shifts in political priorities and bureaucracy.

The series features a number of recurring themes. The office is continually focused on various fads. In one episode, staff become obsessed with exercise after a visit from a Heart Smart representative, practising communal yoga in the office at regular intervals. In another episode, Amy (Davidson) hires an indoor plant consultant, making major changes to office air conditioning and lighting, after Tony's (Sitch) plant dies and he asks for a replacement.

Rhonda (Flanagan) frequently attends conferences or workshops on various forms of online media. She returns to the office drawing priorities away from important projects to superficial online projects on how to engage more with their relevant "audience".

== Background ==
Utopia is written and produced by three of the founding members of Working Dog Productions: Rob Sitch, Santo Cilauro and Tom Gleisner. It is produced by Michael Hirsh, directed by Sitch who also stars as one of the main characters Tony, and casting managed by Jane Kennedy. When casting, Sitch wanted to have actors who possessed a certain acting style, that appeared as if nothing absurd was going on. Sitch described the series as being about "the currency of grand dreams". He described that the idea of the "Nation Building Authority" was to portray it as one of those things that got set up in a bit of a mad rush and that under all the grand dreams there was a white elephant waiting to appear. Utopia continues on the satirical themes of other Working Dog works such as Frontline and The Hollowmen. Sitch also noted that the series was more observational than satirical and that it depicted how organisations may or may not function. When creating the show, Gleisner said the production team spoke to people who worked with government authorities and had experienced for themselves the daily unpredictabilities of working in these environments.

== Characters ==
=== Main ===
- Tony Woodford (Rob Sitch) is the CEO of the NBA. He is constantly exasperated by the ineptitude of his coworkers and the government's agenda, leading the NBA to achieve little but meetings, studies and reports.
- Jim Gibson (Anthony Lehmann) is the government liaison. He is unceasingly positive about grandiose projects that are unachievable or unnecessary and focuses on marketing catchphrases that the government can use.
- Natalie 'Nat' Russell (Celia Pacquola) is the Chief Operations Officer and second-in-command of the NBA. She is often frustrated by the inefficiency of the NBA which makes her managing of projects increasingly difficult.
- Scott Byrnes (Dave Lawson) is a project assistant. While enthusiastic and occasionally helpful, he often misunderstands what is important in tasks and is often convinced by vapid marketing techniques.
- Rhonda Stewart (Kitty Flanagan) is the media manager. She often forcefully pushes fads on the office, ignoring more important priorities, and sides with Jim on overambitious, PR-friendly projects.
- Katie Norris (Emma-Louise Wilson) is Tony's personal assistant. While always meaning well, she is extremely incompetent and frustrates Tony often.
- Hugh (Luke McGregor) is Nat's project assistant. While he understands his work, he is highly pessimistic and also falls victim to marketing techniques. (series 1–2)
- Amy (Michelle Lim Davidson) is the office receptionist. She is always positive and chirpy, but her job does not come naturally to her. She consistently misnames the agency as 'Nation Building Australia'. (series 1–2)
- Karsten Leith (Toby Truslove) is a media and marketing content creator and a close ally of Rhonda, who has a grand vision for projects but makes only superficial changes. (series 1–2; guest series 3–4)
- Ashan De Silva (Dilruk Jayasinha) is a senior project manager at the NBA. He is hardworking and good at his job, but does get involved with useless changes implemented by others. (series 3–5)
- Courtney Kano (Nina Oyama) is the executive assistant and office manager of the NBA. She constantly bothers Tony with banal office task and is occasionally intense over certain topics. (series 3–5)

=== Recurring ===
- Beverley Sadler (Rebecca Massey) is the head of the Human Resources department. She is caught up in HR jargon and is a persistent thorn in Tony and Nat's efforts. (series 2–5)
- Brian Collins (Jamie Robertson) is the Head of Building Services and Security. He often attempts to help the office with technology to varying degrees of success and can often say the wrong thing to the wrong person. (series 3–5)

=== Guests ===
- Amy Lehpamer as Sarah (1 episode)
- Andrew Blackman as Bruce Dennis QC (1 episode)
- Arka Das as Ravi (1 episode)
- Ben Nicholas as Kostas (1 episode)
- Brett Swain as Defence Official (1 episode)
- Elena Mandalis as Marissa (1 episode)
- Ian Bliss as Doug (1 episode)
- Louise Siversen as Linda Hillier (1 episode)
- Lucia Smyrk as Moderator (1 episode)
- Paul Denny as Dennis (1 episode)
- Steve Mouzakis as Cyclist (1 episode)
- Syd Brisbane as Foreman (1 episode)
- Tom Budge as Martin (1 episode)
- Tony Nikolakopoulos as Mr Papagenous (1 episode)

== Episodes ==
=== Series overview ===
Series	Episodes	Originally released	
Series	Episodes	First released	Last released
1	8	13 August 2014	1 October 2014
2	8	19 August 2015	7 October 2015
3	8	19 July 2017	6 September 2017
4	8	21 August 2019	9 October 2019
5	8	7 June 2023	26 July 2023

=== Series 1 (2014) ===
No. overall	No. in series	Title	Directed by	Written by	Original release date	AUS viewers (millions)
1	1	"Wood for the Trees"	Rob Sitch	Rob Sitch, Santo Cilauro and Tom Gleisner	13 August 2014	0.778
Welcome to the Nation Building Authority – where no dream is off the table and no infrastructure project too big...except not really. CEO Tony, 2IC Nat, media manager Rhonda, government liaison Jim, project agents Scotty & Hugh, consultant Karsten and assistants Katie & Amy all make up one of the most dysfunctional workplaces in Australia. Tony's attempts to close a huge international deal are thwarted by Rhonda's insistence on a new logo; Jim's department inadvertently adds a community garden to the list of promises in an urban renewal scheme and asks Nat to intervene.
2	2	"Protected Species"	Rob Sitch	Rob Sitch, Santo Cilauro & Tom Gleisner	20 August 2014	0.597
A massive new project for the NBA is jeopardised by the discovery of a rare grass on the proposed site; Rhonda decides the NBA website needs a dramatic overhaul, enlisting Karsten and his film crew to do it.
3	3	"Very Fast Turnover"	Rob Sitch	Rob Sitch, Santo Cilauro & Tom Gleisner	27 August 2014	0.663
Jim pushes Tony into investigating the feasibility of a very fast train connecting Melbourne, Sydney and Brisbane despite nearly 50 years of studies positing its lack of viability. Amy audits the office's safety protocols.
4	4	"Onwards and Upwards"	Rob Sitch	Rob Sitch, Santo Cilauro & Tom Gleisner	3 September 2014	0.566
An in-demand residential developer asks the NBA to step in and help him to add 35 more storeys to his proposed apartment building. A new employee asks Nat to conduct a performance review of him, which creates tension between Nat and the human resources department.
5	5	"Arts and Minds"	Rob Sitch	Rob Sitch, Santo Cilauro & Tom Gleisner	10 September 2014	0.614
A government initiative to commemorate the completion of a new road by installing roadside art creates a host of problems for Nat and Hugh; Tony is asked to visit a local primary school, which somehow puts into motion the possibility of Australia's first space program.
6	6	"Then We Can Build It"	Rob Sitch	Rob Sitch, Santo Cilauro & Tom Gleisner	17 September 2014	0.603
Jim fields complaints that the Authority's developments have largely ignored Tasmanian interests, so he sends Tony, Katie and Scotty to Tasmania to host a series of community suggestions for a new project. Rhonda and Amy organise an internationally-renowned motivational expert to conduct a week-long incursion at the NBA offices.
7	7	"The First Project"	Rob Sitch	Rob Sitch, Santo Cilauro & Tom Gleisner	24 September 2014	0.620
Tony reflects back on his first week on the job: a mess of angry cyclists, teething problems and plumbing issues.
8	8	"The Whole Enchilada"	Rob Sitch	Rob Sitch, Santo Cilauro & Tom Gleisner	1 October 2014	0.620
The complete and utter failure of the Northern Food Bowl project leads Jim to ask Tony to take a look. Nat deals with delays in a Perth freeway upgrade and the Western Australian public relations departments. Jim announces a big shake-up at the NBA.

=== Series 2 (2015) ===
No. overall	No. in series	Title	Directed by	Written by	Original release date	AUS viewers (millions)
9	1	"A Fresh Start"	Rob Sitch	Rob Sitch, Santo Cilauro & Tom Gleisner	19 August 2015	0.779
Back with a vengeance, Tony is determined to kick off the newly expanded NBA with efficiency, however is foiled at every turn by office distractions, fitness initiatives and tech issues. Nat is touched by Katie's hometown banding together to raise $30,000 to fix their local swimming pool, and vows to help, inadvertently triggering a billion-dollar rural health initiative in the process.
10	2	"Shovels Ready"	Rob Sitch	Rob Sitch, Santo Cilauro & Tom Gleisner	26 August 2015	0.738
Tony is excited to finally get started on a tunnelling project on the verge of construction, however Rhonda's insistence on a fanciful launch event jeopardises the entire project. Exhausted from constant commuting back and forth from the NBA's Brisbane office, Nat asks the human resources department to hire a colleague as a manager there, but HR have other ideas.
11	3	"Keep Out – Public Property"	Rob Sitch	Rob Sitch, Santo Cilauro & Tom Gleisner	2 September 2015	0.769
Faced with questions about why a new parkland project has no parkland, Tony and the Authority have no answers. Nat is desperate to receive contracts from Adelaide, but the NBA's new courier isn't as efficient as she would have hoped. Healthy Heart Week hits the office.
12	4	"Dot Dot Dot"	Rob Sitch	Rob Sitch, Santo Cilauro & Tom Gleisner	9 September 2015	0.845
After the Prime Minister foolishly promises an 'Education Nation' initiative to the media, Jim asks Tony to create one for him. Nat receives a Freedom of Information request, and goes to Rhonda and Hugh for help.
13	5	"Terminal Problems"	Rob Sitch	Rob Sitch, Santo Cilauro & Tom Gleisner	16 September 2015	0.797
After conducting over six months' work on a proposal for Sydney's second airport, Jim asks Tony to find a way to kill the project due to electoral pressure on the Prime Minister. Rhonda nominates Nat as the keynote speaker for a Women in Power conference, and enlists Karsten to 'improve' Nat's story.
14	6	"Starting the Conversation"	Rob Sitch	Rob Sitch, Santo Cilauro & Tom Gleisner	23 September 2015	0.803
Jim is pressured by a band of housing developers to rezone large swaths of farmland – a request he palms off to Tony. Rhonda's recent attendance at a conference on social media engagement creates a bit of a distraction for the NBA employees.
15	7	"Reporting for Duty"	Rob Sitch	Rob Sitch, Santo Cilauro & Tom Gleisner	30 September 2015	0.866
Tony and the team work to somehow justify a cross-city tunnelling project that all experts agree is not viable. Angered by the incompetence of an employee, Nat attempts to fire her. Amy becomes the barista of the office.
16	8	"Summit Attempt"	Rob Sitch	Rob Sitch, Santo Cilauro & Tom Gleisner	7 October 2015	0.756
Tony is determined to take his vacation, but is consistently thwarted by a host of problems in the office. An infrastructure conference is coming up, but Karsten and Rhonda's involvement causes complications.

=== Series 3 (2017) ===
No. overall	No. in series	Title	Directed by	Written by	Original release date	AUS viewers (millions)
17	1	"Blue Sky Thinking"	Rob Sitch	Rob Sitch, Santo Cilauro & Tom Gleisner	19 July 2017	0.842
Jim and Rhonda force Tony to help step in and save a flawed government scheme. Nat is driven mad by a local council worried about diversity and inclusion in a proposal. The staff of the NBA also run a local talent contest.
18	2	"Smart Cities"	Rob Sitch	Rob Sitch, Santo Cilauro & Tom Gleisner	26 July 2017	0.647
Rhonda forces Tony to be keynote speaker at the Smart Cities conference. Nat is looking set for a promotion until Beverley from HR decides to step in. The arrival of a new couch has unintended consequences.
19	3	"Nation Shapers"	Rob Sitch	Rob Sitch, Santo Cilauro & Tom Gleisner	2 August 2017	0.674
Nat is asked to help out the Minister with a problem-plagued I.T. project. Meanwhile, a poor radio interview sees Tony forced to undertake media training.
20	4	"Clause for Concern"	Rob Sitch	Rob Sitch, Santo Cilauro & Tom Gleisner	9 August 2017	0.721
The NBA team is asked to help out with the sale of a port, Rhonda decides it is time for a digital upgrade and Tony is forced to spend a night outdoors in the name of charity.
21	5	"Start Up"	Rob Sitch	Rob Sitch, Santo Cilauro & Tom Gleisner	16 August 2017	0.684
Fresh from a trip to Silicon Valley, Jim asks Tony for help getting the Government involved in the world of start-ups. Meanwhile, a complaint from an ex-employee sees Nat accused of bullying.
22	6	"Snouts in the Trough"	Rob Sitch	Rob Sitch, Santo Cilauro & Tom Gleisner	23 August 2017	0.702
Jim and Rhonda ask Tony for help building a new airport rail link, but Tony's proposal shocks them both. Meanwhile, Nat has her entire week derailed by a tweet. A senior citizen "Bert" is hired to help out around the office. Bert knows more than almost anyone else in the office. Bert is played by Jim Daly.
23	7	"On the Defence"	Rob Sitch	Rob Sitch, Santo Cilauro & Tom Gleisner	30 August 2017	0.744
With a major defence white paper about to be launched Jim and Rhonda ask Tony for help. Meanwhile Nat is summoned to Canberra for an exciting new job. Back at the office it is time for a Risk and Safety audit.
24	8	"Independence Day"	Rob Sitch	Rob Sitch, Santo Cilauro & Tom Gleisner	6 September 2017	0.739
After threatening to resign Tony is offered his own independent infrastructure board but Jim has his own ideas about the word "independent". Rhonda & Beverley decide it's time for a new office reporting structure.

=== Series 4 (2019) ===
No. overall	No. in series	Title	Directed by	Written by	Original release date	AUS viewers (millions)
25	1	"The Law's the Law"	Rob Sitch	Rob Sitch, Santo Cilauro & Tom Gleisner	21 August 2019	0.711
Tony and Jim clash over the best way to tackle high level company tax fraud. Keen to launch a major Government report, Rhonda seeks help from a well-known television personality.
26	2	"Working with Children"	Rob Sitch	Rob Sitch, Santo Cilauro & Tom Gleisner	28 August 2019	0.660
The arrival of a work experience student leads to unexpected Ministerial developments. Nat is invited to join a prestigious board but soon finds herself clashing with the Chair.
27	3	"Pipe Dreams"	Rob Sitch	Rob Sitch, Santo Cilauro & Tom Gleisner	4 September 2019	0.442
Tony's opportunity to pitch an important proposal is undermined by computer issues. Nat and Rhonda are forced to deal with community backlash from a prematurely-announced construction project.
28	4	"Mission Creeps"	Rob Sitch	Rob Sitch, Santo Cilauro & Tom Gleisner	11 September 2019	0.595
Tony is asked by the Minister to oversee the implementation on a new electronic I.D card scheme. Nat and Ash must face the fact that their expensive wildlife preservation project may not have actually preserved any wildlife.
29	5	"The Blame Game"	Rob Sitch	Rob Sitch, Santo Cilauro & Tom Gleisner	18 September 2019	0.572
Tony is forced to defend himself when Jim and Rhonda try to blame a failed project on the NBA. Nat and Ash prepare for an important overseas trade delegation. And the new office security system proves a little too 'secure'.
30	6	"Ticks of Approval"	Rob Sitch	Rob Sitch, Santo Cilauro & Tom Gleisner	25 September 2019	0.638
A routine urban development project proves surprisingly difficult for Tony when multiple Government departments get involved. Nat is forced to assist the Minister with a major challenge – choosing this year's Christmas cards.
31	7	"Levers of Power"	Rob Sitch	Rob Sitch, Santo Cilauro & Tom Gleisner	2 October 2019	0.569
Tony is on the verge of completing a major report when Rhonda invites an ABC documentary crew to spend a week in the NBA offices. And the NBA staff are divided over an important issue of office catering.
32	8	"The Ghost of Christmas Future"	Rob Sitch	Rob Sitch, Santo Cilauro & Tom Gleisner	9 October 2019	0.571
Following a trip to Canberra Tony finds himself at loggerheads with Rhonda and Jim after he refuses to back a major new government initiative. Nat and Ash are forced to break some bad news to the Minister.

=== Series 5 (2023) ===
No. overall	No. in series	Title	Directed by	Written by	Original release date	AUS viewers (millions)
33	1	"The Buck Stops Where?"	Rob Sitch	Rob Sitch, Santo Cilauro & Tom Gleisner	7 June 2023	0.607
The beleaguered staff of the NBA are still trying to get the job done in the face of endless backflips, government interference and ever-shifting priorities. Tony and Scott investigate prolonged delays on a freeway upgrade.
34	2	"Grand Designs"	Rob Sitch	Rob Sitch, Santo Cilauro & Tom Gleisner	14 June 2023	0.557
Tony cops media heat for a solar scheme with poor public uptake, and a completed bypass is held up from opening due to some signage for a problematic monument. Patrick the accountant torments the office with his stories.
35	3	"The Promise Land"	Rob Sitch	Rob Sitch, Santo Cilauro & Tom Gleisner	21 June 2023	0.474
The Government stalls on an election promise of the NBA moving to independent status and the office undergoes workplace respect training, complicating a prospective romance between Nat and a visiting consultant.
36	4	"Tunnel Vision"	Rob Sitch	Rob Sitch, Santo Cilauro & Tom Gleisner	28 June 2023	0.590
Jim ups security measures while trying to sway the outcome of tenders for an international partnership. Nat is infuriated by her new assistant. The office is challenged on green energy initiatives.
37	5	"Lights, Camera, Inaction"	Rob Sitch	Rob Sitch, Santo Cilauro & Tom Gleisner	5 July 2023	0.521
Tony is frozen out by the Minister when he's reluctant to announce an ambitious new project. The NBA comes under scrutiny by UNESCO over the Great Barrier Reef's endangerment status. Scott starts an NBA TikTok account.
38	6	"Story Time"	Rob Sitch	Rob Sitch, Santo Cilauro & Tom Gleisner	12 July 2023	0.498
Rhonda forces Tony to fast-track a long-term regional rail project; Nat goes the wrong kind of viral for a problematic photo; Ash investigates a recurring charge on the company account while adjusting to his new e-scooter.
39	7	"Frequently Avoided Questions"	Rob Sitch	Rob Sitch, Santo Cilauro & Tom Gleisner	19 July 2023	0.455
A security consultant creates stress by levelling up the NBA's cyber safety. Nat faces the consequences of an inept employee. Jim lumps Tony with responding to a freight report the Minister's failed to act upon.
40	8	"Wide Awoke"	Rob Sitch	Rob Sitch, Santo Cilauro & Tom Gleisner	26 July 2023	0.504
Nat and Ash work on deciphering who owns the title on an historic project. Tony's important presentation is derailed by Rhonda's insistence that the office undergoes an E.S.G pulse check. Brian works on securing the building.

== Scripts ==
In 2015, HarperCollins published the scripts of the first two seasons. These have since been made available as an eBook.

== Reception ==
Anne Pender, writing for The Conversation, described Utopia as "light – but sharp and witty" political satire. She praised the talents of the writers and the cast of "exceptional actors". She also noted that it was an improvement from The Speechmaker, a stage show that Sitch and Working Dog Productions put together earlier in 2014. David Knox from TV Tonight noted the show's similarity to Sitch's previous work, The Hollowmen. In addition to praising the performances of cast members, he opined that the city backdrop of East Melbourne gave the series a "fresh, contemporary feel" accompanied by a "driving percussion soundtrack" and "cityscape montages". Ahmad Khan from The Huffington Post drew comparisons with the earlier and more cynical seasons of American workplace comedies The Office and Parks and Recreation, as well as saying that Utopia offers a "painfully funny satire that focuses on the interaction between the media and press friendly projects wanted by government administrations and the disparities it presents to those in the agency who would prefer practicality."

Netflix purchased the rights to the program in 2015 to broadcast the first two series under the title Dreamland. The first series began airing on PBS in the United States on 21 July 2018.

=== Awards and nominations ===
Year	Award	Category	Recipients and nominees	Result
2015	4th AACTA Awards	Best Television Comedy Series	Utopia	Won
2015	4th AACTA Awards	Best Performance in a Television Comedy	Celia Pacquola for Utopia	Nominated
2015	Logie Awards	Most Outstanding Comedy Program	Utopia	Won
2015	5th AACTA Awards	Best Television Comedy Series	Utopia	Nominated
2015	5th AACTA Awards	Best Performance in a Television Comedy	Celia Pacquola for Utopia	Won
2016	Logie Awards	Most Outstanding Comedy Program	Utopia	Nominated
2017	7th AACTA Awards	Best Comedy Series	Utopia	Won
2017	7th AACTA Awards	Best Comedy Performance	Rob Sitch for Utopia	Nominated
2017	7th AACTA Awards	Best Screenplay in Television	Utopia	Nominated
2017	7th AACTA Awards	Best Editing in Television	Phil Simon and Santo Cilauro for Utopia	Nominated
2018	Logie Awards	Graham Kennedy Award for Most Popular New Talent	Dilruk Jayasinha for Utopia	Won
2018	Logie Awards	Most Popular Actress	Celia Pacquola for Utopia	Nominated
2019	9th AACTA Awards	Best Comedy Series	Utopia	Nominated
2019	9th AACTA Awards	Best Teleplay	Utopia	Nominated
2024	Logie Awards of 2024	Best Lead Actor in a Comedy	Rob Sitch for Utopia	Won
2024	Logie Awards of 2024	Best Lead Actress in a Comedy	Kitty Flanagan for Utopia	Won
2024	Logie Awards of 2024	Best Scripted Comedy Program	Utopia	Won

== See also ==
- List of Australian television series
- List of programs broadcast by ABC (Australian TV network)
