= Sheborg Massacre =

- Film poster
- Directed by: Daniel Armstrong
- Written by: Daniel Armstrong
- Produced by: Daniel Armstrong; Anthony Moran
- Starring: Daisy Masterman; Whitney Duff; Emma-Louise Wilson
- Cinematography: Brendan O'Shea
- Edited by: Daniel Armstrong
- Music by: KidCrusher; The Mercy Kills
- Production company: Strongman Pictures Entertainment
- Release date: 4 July 2016
- Running time: 90 minutes
- Country: Australia
- Language: English

Sheborg Massacre is 2016 Australian neo-pulp film written and directed by Daniel Armstrong and starring Daisy Masterman, Whitney Duff, and Emma-Louise Wilson.

== Premise ==
When an alien fugitive crash lands into a local puppy farm and begins turning people into machines that feed on puppy flesh, Dylan and her BFF Eddie have to decide whether or not to take on the SheBorg menace, and save the world.

== Cast ==
- Daisy Masterman as Eddie
- Whitney Duff as Dylan
- Emma-Louise Wilson as Sheborg
- Tommy Hellfire as Sam
- Louise Monnington as Velma
- Mark Entwistle as Rik
- Sean McIntyre as Mayor Jack Whiteman
- KidCrusher as Traal
- Danae Swinburne as Ultra Traal
- Gerry Mahoney as The Vet
- Laura Soall as Lois
- Dayna Seville as Cop
- Maggie Chretien as The Receptionist
- Kristin Condon as Constable Nobody Cares
- Brenton Foale as Jo Public
- Sarah Howett as Minion
- Benjamin Hall as The Gardener
- Jasy Holt as Al

== Production ==
Armstrong describes Sheborg Massacre as a neo-pulp film. "Neo-pulp lovingly embraces the most extreme, cliche, and supercilious elements of pop culture and pulp literature and puts them in a human context. SHEBORG MASSACRE itself is a 50s teen rebel flick set in a B grade sci-fi world from the early 80s, with horror style violence. It’s not a spoof, it’s not horror, it’s not action, it’s not sci-fi, it’s not drama. It’s all of these things. It’s neo-pulp."

Sheborg Massacre was produced by Melbourne-based production company Strongman Pictures Entertainment, and written, directed and edited by Daniel Armstrong. Armstrong's previous films include the international cult hit MurderDrome - the world's first roller derby horror movie, which hit a chord with alternative cinema fans worldwide, and the wrestle-ploitation film From Parts Unknown: Fight Like A Girl.

== History ==
Allegedly inspired by true events, the feature film Sheborg Massacre began production mid 2015. Most of the filming took place at a property in Melton, Victoria. With an estimated budget of $20,000 the cast and crew completed the project over the space of 33 weekends and an unknown number of evening shoots.

== Accolades ==
| Award | Category | Subject | Result |
|---|---|---|---|
| Melbourne Underground Film Festival | Special Jury Award | Daniel Armstrong | Won |
| Melbourne Underground Film Festival | Best Actress | Daisy Masterman | Won |
| Melbourne Underground Film Festival | Best Actress | Whitney Duff | Won |
