= Daisy Masterman =

Australian actress

- Born: Melbourne VIC, Australia
- Education: University of Ballarat
- Occupation: Actress
- Years active: 2008 - present

Daisy Masterman is an Australian actress

== Private life ==
Masterman graduated from Methodist Ladies' College, Melbourne in 2008. During her time in high school she was involved in school plays and took drama lessons as a hobby, but it was only after she left that she decided to start pursuing acting further. She went on to receive a Bachelor of Performing Arts from the University of Ballarat Arts Academy. She has appeared in many commercials for brands such as Tetley and Cadbury. Along with acting Daisy loves figure skating and has appeared on The Today Show and The David and Kim Show as an exhibitionist skater. She also is a big animal lover and animal rights activist.

== Career ==
After having done a few commercials and appearances Masterman went on to receive the role of Sydney Sage in the book trailers of Bloodlines which is the sequel series to the Vampire Academy novels.

Masterman also played a supporting role in the 2013 Australian feature film, MurderDrome, a comical slasher film that she had to learn to roller skate and play roller derby for. She went on to work with MurderDrome director, Daniel Armstrong again in his 2015 film Sheborg Massacre, this time as the lead role of Eddie.

She also voices the lead character 'Love' in the Gwen Stefani cartoon, Kuu Kuu Harajuku.

== Filmography ==
- Nova Star (2019) ... Mack
- Underbelly Files: Chopper (2018) ... Casino Girl
- Tarnation (2017) ... Oscar
- Sheborg Massacre (2016) ... Eddie
- Kuu Kuu Harajuku (2015 - 2018) ... Love (voice)
- The Ruby Circle (2015) ... Sydney Sage
- Complicity (2015) ... Daisy
- Silver Shadows (2014) ... Sydney Sage
- MurderDrome (2014) ... Princess Bitchface
- The Fiery Heart (2013) ... Sydney Sage
- The Indigo Spell (2012) ... Sydney Sage
- The Golden Lily (2012) ... Sydney Sage
- Bloodlines (2011) ... Sydney Sage
