= The Hollowmen =

2008 Australian comedy TV series

- DVD cover
- Genre: Situation comedy-Drama
- Created by: Santo Cilauro; Tom Gleisner; Rob Sitch
- Directed by: Rob Sitch
- Opening theme: "North by North" by The Bats
- Country of origin: Australia
- Original language: English
- No. of seasons: 2
- No. of episodes: 12

Production
- Executive producer: Working Dog Productions
- Producers: Santo Cilauro; Tom Gleisner; Rob Sitch
- Production company: Working Dog Productions

Original release
- Network: ABC1
- Release: 9 July – 8 October 2008

Related
- Utopia

The Hollowmen is an Australian television comedy series set in the offices of the Central Policy Unit, a fictional political advisory unit personally set up by the Prime Minister to help him get re-elected. Their brief is long-term vision; to stop worrying about tomorrow's headlines, and focus on next week's.

The Hollowmen was first broadcast on Wednesday, 9 July 2008, on ABC1. Each series comprises six half-hour episodes. On the eve of the first episode's national premiere, the series was approved by the ABC for a second series. The second series was screened immediately after the first, from 3 September.

The comedy-drama satire is produced by Working Dog Productions, which was also responsible for Frontline, The Panel, Thank God You're Here and Utopia. The music used during the opening credits is an edited instrumental excerpt of the 1987 song "North by North" by New Zealand band The Bats. A special one-off presentation of The Hollowmen was created by Working Dog and played at Parliament House in Canberra on 11 March 2009, in support of the ABC's funding bid for 2009–12.

== Cast ==
=== Main ===
- Rob Sitch as Tony, the Prime Minister's Principal Private Secretary
- Lachy Hulme as David 'Murph' Murphy, Senior Political Advisor and Director of the Central Policy Unit
- Merrick Watts as Nick, Senior Political Advisor
- Neil Melville as Ian, the Prime Minister's Chief of Staff
- David James as Phillip, Secretary of the Department of the Prime Minister and Cabinet
- Stephen Hall as Warren, Departmental Under-Secretary
- Jacquie Brennan as Mel, Senior Media Advisor
- Santo Cilauro as Theo Tsolakis, Head of Market Research
- Nicola Parry as Holly, Unit Office Manager

=== Supporting ===
- Rob Carlton as Kenny Pratt, advisor to the previous PM
- Graeme Blundell as Geoff, Party Director
- Leonie Hemsworth as Dianne, Prime Minister's Secretary
- Sacha Joseph as Vanmathy, Unit Office
- Ben Chisholm as Josh, Unit Office
- Sarah Arthur Young as Sarah, Unit Office Receptionist
- Phil Pollard as Phil, Prime Minister's Security Guard
- Brett Swain as Talkback Caller

=== Guests ===
- Garry Who as Real Estate Agent

The Prime Minister is an unseen character.

== Episodes ==
=== Series overview ===
Season	Episodes	Originally released	
Season	Episodes	First released	Last released
1	6	9 July 2008	27 August 2008
2	6	3 September 2008	8 October 2008

=== Series 1 (2008) ===
No. overall	No. in season	Title	Directed by	Written by	Original release date
1	1	"Fat Chance"	Rob Sitch	Santo Cilauro, Tom Gleisner & Rob Sitch	9 July 2008
The Central Policy Unit must come up with a meaningful plan to combat obesity in schools in order to keep the Prime Minister's momentum rolling.
2	2	"The Ambassador"	Rob Sitch	Santo Cilauro, Tom Gleisner & Rob Sitch	16 July 2008
A troublesome Senator agrees to leave politics behind if he gets a nice diplomatic posting. But, unfortunately for the Central Policy Unit, Phillip is about to give a speech outlining a plan commissioned by the PM announcing restrictions that mean only the most qualified people are eligible for appointment as ambassadors for the nation.
3	3	"A Time for Talk"	Rob Sitch	Santo Cilauro, Tom Gleisner & Rob Sitch	23 August 2008
When conflict breaks out overseas, the Central Policy Unit must find a way to intervene without hurting the international relationships. Murph quickly finds that there is a lot of talk, but not much action.
4	4	"Rear Vision"	Rob Sitch	Santo Cilauro, Tom Gleisner & Rob Sitch	30 July 2008
The budget lacks an eye-catching "centrepiece" and Tony asks Murph to come up with a last minute policy which will give the PM the visionary public image he wants.
5	5	"Military Matters"	Rob Sitch	Santo Cilauro, Tom Gleisner & Rob Sitch	6 August 2008
After an embarrassing incident at an air force base brings military recruitment into the headlines, the Central Policy Unit must make life in the uniform appealing to Generation Y.
6	6	"A Housing Crisis"	Rob Sitch	Santo Cilauro, Tom Gleisner & Rob Sitch	27 August 2008
A report into the cost of maintaining Kirribilli House comes back to bite Ian. With Phillip in charge, the report looks set to embarrass the PM right before another interest rate rise, unless Murph can figure out a way to lower Kirribilli's price tag and make it less elitist.

=== Series 2 (2008) ===
No. overall	No. in season	Title	Directed by	Written by	Original release date
7	1	"Shared Interests"	Rob Sitch	Santo Cilauro, Tom Gleisner & Rob Sitch	3 September 2008
A scandal with a Junior Minister and poor fashion sense leads to a "blippy dip" in the PM's public image. Murph handles a government crackdown whilst Tony tackles pin-stripes and French cuffs.
8	2	"Edifice Complex"	Rob Sitch	Santo Cilauro, Tom Gleisner & Rob Sitch	10 September 2008
The PM has recently opened several buildings commissioned by his predecessors, which starts him thinking about his own legacy. Unfortunately for Murph, legacy translates to a massive building somewhere in the parliamentary triangle.
9	3	"Wonder Drug"	Rob Sitch	Santo Cilauro, Tom Gleisner & Rob Sitch	17 September 2008
Pressure mounts on the Government to fund an expensive new pill, despite evidence that it may not be worth funding at all.
10	4	"Vulnerable to Attack"	Rob Sitch	Santo Cilauro, Tom Gleisner & Rob Sitch	24 September 2008
The PM's plans to increase spending on national security run into trouble when the Department starts talking about cost-cutting. Meanwhile the Unit ends up exploiting some eager High School students who have won a trip to Canberra.
11	5	"A Waste of Energy"	Rob Sitch	Santo Cilauro, Tom Gleisner & Rob Sitch	1 October 2008
Global warming is hot on the agenda with the Unit taking up the government's new 'carbon challenge'. But a blindsighted promise to raise emission standards with China may cause some serious problems for international relations.
12	6	"A Quiet January"	Rob Sitch	Santo Cilauro, Tom Gleisner & Rob Sitch	8 October 2008
The second half of January has no news stories. But a surprise trip for the PM to Antarctica is soon devised to fill this space.

== Episode ratings ==
The first season premiered at 9:30 pm on Wednesday 9 July 2008. After episode 5, it was removed from schedule due to the 2008 Beijing Olympics. The season finale aired at 9:00 pm on Wednesday 27 August.

#	Episode No.	Airdate	Time	Ratings (5 capital cities)	Timeslot rank	Overall nightly rank
1.01	Fat Chance	9 July 2008	Wednesday 9:30pm	1,185,000	1st	13th
1.02	The Ambassador	16 July 2008	Wednesday 9:30pm	1,040,000	2nd	16th
1.03	A Time for Talk	23 July 2008	Wednesday 9:30pm	950,000	3rd	18th
1.04	Rear Vision	30 July 2008	Wednesday 9:30pm	996,000	2nd	16th
1.05	Military Matters	6 August 2008	Wednesday 9:30pm	816,000	3rd	24th
1.06	A Housing Crisis	27 August 2008	Wednesday 9:00pm	926,000	2nd	15th
2.01	Shared Interests	3 September 2008	Wednesday 9:00pm	931,000	2nd	17th
2.02	Edifice Complex	10 September 2008	Wednesday 9:00pm	1,044,000	2nd	16th
2.03	Wonder Drug	17 September 2008	Wednesday 9:00pm	941,000	3rd	19th
2.04	Vulnerable to Attack	24 September 2008	Wednesday 9:00pm	906,000	3rd	15th
2.05	A Waste of Energy	1 October 2008	Wednesday 9:00pm	877,000	3rd	16th
2.06	A Quiet January	8 October 2008	Wednesday 9:00pm	931,000	3rd	16th

== Production ==
It was partially inspired by Cilauro's 1996 documentary The Campaign about Paul Keating's failed election. They initially wanted to make a series about an independent politician, but decided that such people didn't really hold much power and wanted to explore the idea that politics is run like a corporation.

== Reception ==
Debi Enker from the Sydney Morning Herald described the first episode of The Hollowmen as using "low-key style [and] sandpaper-dry wit" to show the hollowness of the political newscycle.

Opposition leader Tony Abbott used its premiere to criticise the government, claiming that the "Howard government didn't work like that", and that the series would not have made sense under a Liberal government.

It won the 2009 Logie for Most Outstanding Comedy Program.

=== Accuracy ===
In 2008 the Sydney Morning Herald interviewed political advisors about the accuracy of the show. Political advisors noted that the characters were more cynical and amoral than them and their colleagues, and played to people's prejudices, but a few conceded that they knew people like Rob Sitch's character, Tony. They found that pollsters were portrayed as having too much power in the show, and noted that senior public servants were not as innocent as they were portrayed.

In contrast they found larger themes of media driven policies, "arse-covering" and superficial treatment of complex issues were "remarkably accurate", noting that the Melbourne 2am Lockout laws were a good example.

== Home media ==
Series 1 and 2 of The Hollowmen is available on DVD as a three disc box set.

== See also ==
- List of Australian television series
- List of programs broadcast by ABC (Australian TV network)
- The Thick of It
- The Hollow Men
- Frontline
- The West Wing
- Yes Minister
- Absolute Power
- K Street
- Utopia
