= Tarnation (2017 film) =

- Film poster
- Directed by: Sheikh Nehan Alam
- Written by: Jahanzaib Nissar
- Produced by: Syed Mohammad Geelani
- Starring: Daisy Masterman
- Cinematography: Brendan O'Shea
- Edited by: Daniel Armstrong
- Music by: Gerard Mack
- Production company: Strongman Pictures Entertainment
- Release date: 4 July 2017
- Running time: 90 minutes
- Country: Australia
- Language: English

Tarnation is a 2017 Australian horror comedy film directed by Sheikh Nehan Alam and starring Daisy Masterman.

== Plot ==
When Oscar's dreams of becoming a rock star are destroyed after she's kicked out of her band and her boyfriend walks out on her, taking their cat, she goes out to a remote cabin in the woods near the ghost town of Tarnation to collect her thoughts. Unbeknownst to her, the satanic master of a demon unicorn seeks Oscar's blood to complete a ritual that will raise the devil from Hell. In order to stop Tarnation from falling upon the world, Oscar must battle a demonic force that can possess anyone in the woods and ultimately face the evil within her own soul.

== Cast ==
- Daisy Masterman as Oscar
- Jasy Holt as Cameron
- Sean McIntyre as the boss
- Sarah Howett as the virgin sacrifice
- Joshua Diaz as Bo
- Emma-Louise Wilson as Wheels
- Blake Waldron as Wilmer
- Nichola Jayne as Dayna
