= MurderDrome =

Australian horror action film

- Directed by: Daniel Armstrong
- Written by: Daniel Armstrong; Louise Monnington; Trent Schwarz
- Produced by: Daniel Armstrong; Anthony Moran
- Starring: Amber Sajben; Jake Brown; Rachael Blackwood
- Cinematography: Brendan O'Shea
- Edited by: Daniel Armstrong
- Release dates: November 2013 (Monster Fest); 9 September 2014
- Running time: 73 minutes
- Country: Australia
- Language: English

MurderDrome is a 2013 Australian action horror sports film written and directed by Daniel Armstrong and starring Amber Sajben.

== Synopsis ==
Cherry Skye competes in the sport of roller derby in Australia and ends up falling in love with Brad, which gets the attention of Brad's ex-girlfriend Hell Gazer, who happens to be her derby opponent. This love triangle arouses a demon-spirit who claims to want Skye's soul.

== Cast ==
- Amber Sajben as Cherry Skye
- Jake Brown as Brad
- Rachael Blackwood as Hell Gazer
- Kat Anderson as Trans Em
- Demonique Deluxe as Demonique
- Daisy Masterman as Princess Bitchface
- Max Marchione as The Janitor
- Pepper Minx as Pepper

== Reception ==
Gareth Jones of Dread Central rated the film 2.5 stars out of 5 and wrote that it is "predominantly a barely coherent mess", though it "still retains a level of charm owing to its punk-rock sensibilities and general attitude." Ed Fortune of Starburst called it "poorly directed, badly shot, the pacing is terrible and the plot makes no sense, becoming incoherent at times." However, he also opined that the dialogue is "really good" and that the "mix of funny lines, exploitation kitsch and sub-culture setting almost guarantees that it will become a cult classic." Horror Society gave the film a 4/5 rating and called it a "rockabilly horror show for the ages."

DailyGrindhouse.com called the film "a gleefully bloody tale of a roller derby team against the supernatural, and it's just as energetic and fun as the sport itself."

Felix Vasquez Jr. from Cinema Crazed wrote in his review "There's still a lot of potential for more great movies about the Roller Derby lifestyle, and MurderDrome just isn't it."
