= Any Questions for Ben? =

- Theatrical release poster
- Directed by: Rob Sitch
- Screenplay by: Rob Sitch; Santo Cilauro; Tom Gleisner
- Produced by: Rob Sitch; Santo Cilauro; Tom Gleisner; Michael Hirsh
- Starring: Josh Lawson; Rachael Taylor
- Cinematography: Stefan Duscio
- Edited by: Stuart Morley; Phil Simon
- Production company: Working Dog
- Distributed by: Roadshow Films
- Release date: 9 February 2012 (Australia)
- Running time: 114 minutes
- Country: Australia
- Language: English
- Budget: $11 million
- Box office: $2.8 million

Any Questions for Ben? (also released in some countries as Until She Came Along) is a 2012 Australian dramedy film created by Working Dog Productions, directed by Rob Sitch. It tells the story of Ben, a wealthy millennial living in Melbourne who is constantly quitting jobs, moving house, changing partners and travelling internationally. When he attends a school reunion to give a speech about his achievements, he realises he is dissatisfied with life but is also reunited with Alex, who now works as a human rights lawyer for the UN in Yemen. As their relationship progresses and Ben goes through various difficulties, Alex travels between Melbourne and Yemen eight times throughout the film.

Any Questions for Ben? stars Josh Lawson, Rachael Taylor, Felicity Ward, Daniel Henshall, and Christian Clark. It was written by Santo Cilauro, Tom Gleisner, and Rob Sitch.

== Plot ==
Ben North (Josh Lawson) is a highly-paid 27-year-old marketing creative who lives in a large inner-city apartment in Curtin House on Swanston Street in Melbourne's CBD with his flatmates, Nick (Daniel Henshall) and Andy (Christian Clark). Ben is presented as a typical millennial as he is prone to frequently changing jobs and moving house just because he feels like it. He is also sexually promiscuous and romantically non-committal.

=== Alex in Yemen ===
The film opens with Ben attending a launch party for "Minsk Vodka", which he has rebranded with a Russian theme despite the fact it is actually from New Zealand. While at this party, he meets and sets up a date with a woman named Fleur (Chantelle Raleigh) who is working at the event as a runway model. As the night winds up, Ben tells his boss that he is planning to quit.

Ben's last day at his current job is also his birthday. His office throws a farewell party for him, though they note that he has only worked there for seven months. Only his colleague Katey (Emma-Louise Wilson) realises that it is also his birthday. She attempts to seduce Ben in his office as he is on his way out, but he rebuffs her since he has a date with Fleur that evening and believes there is the prospect of a serious relationship. When he arrives to meet Fleur at a cafe in Degraves Street, he has already forgotten her name. Afterwards, he parts ways with Fleur and goes on a shopping spree alone. Later that night, he arrives back at his apartment to find dozens of his friends have arranged a surprise birthday party. Among the other guests are Ben's mentor Sam (Lachy Hulme), Nick's girlfriend, Em (Felicity Ward) and Ben's ex-girlfriend Steph (Virginia Bowers), who is never seen again. Fleur also arrives later. Em gifts Ben with some photo frames, and tells him he'll now to have to make some memories worthy of putting in them. We also learn that this is Ben's seventh apartment in five years.

Later, Ben takes Fleur out for a night on the town with Nick and Em. She talks about her upcoming audition to work as a TV weather presenter, a topic which Nick and Em find interesting and ask her several questions about. Ben is jealous of the attention. He visits her the following day, as she works her day job at a Myer makeup counter, and breaks up with her.

Ben's new job for RVB Brands Group involves rebranding the Simpson sportswear brand for young women. Meanwhile, Ben also visits his parents. His mother (Tracy Mann) gifts him a copy of Ernest Hemingway's The Snows of Kilimanjaro. They were under the impression he was planning a trip to Kilimanjaro and are visibly disappointed to learn he will now be travelling to Bali instead. They also are disappointed to learn he has broken up with Steph and do not understand what it is that Ben does for a living.

=== Alex in Melbourne ===
Ben receives a letter from his former high school, asking him to speak at "Careers Day" about his achievements. He reluctantly decides to attend, and there meets the current school principal (Rob Sitch), Jim (Ed Kavalee) and Alex (Rachael Taylor). Jim has competed in archery at the Olympics, winning a bronze medal. Ben passive-aggressively downplays Jim's achievements, feeling insecure about himself. Alex now works as a human rights lawyer in Yemen for the United Nations and has made the trip back to Melbourne just to address the school. She and Ben were once friends but had lost touch. After high school they went to the University of Melbourne together, but Ben dropped out before graduating.

Ben watches in awe and jealousy as Alex addresses a group of rapt school students about her achievements. When the crowd are asked if they have any questions, almost every hand goes up. Ben's speech follows hers. He speaks haltingly and nervously about his marketing career, and is shocked when the audience do not have any questions for him. Alex approaches Ben after the speeches and asks him out for a drink, but this does not eventuate. She then returns to Yemen.

=== Alex in Yemen ===
Ben, Andy, Nick and Em go to a rooftop cinema screening of Mad Max 2, and argue afterwards about whether Max is in search of spiritual fulfilment or merely "petrol and food for his dog." Em then offers to put Ben in touch with Alex, but again this does not eventuate.

On Christmas Eve, Ben attends his office Christmas party on a Yarra River ferry. Late in the night, Ben's good-natured boss Malcolm (David James) announces that they will all attend Carols by Candlelight at the Sidney Myer Music Bowl in a specially reserved row. Instead, Ben takes a female colleague home and has sex with her on the couch as the carols continue on his TV. In the days that follow, he receives a Christmas card from Alex in Yemen but does not reply.

At the office, Ben is hard at work on the Simpson rebrand but clashes with his colleague Ken (Alan Brough). The night before the Australian Open, Ben and Malcolm attend a corporate event to meet famed Russian tennis player Katerina Sinova (Liliya May) in order to recruit her to be a Simpson brand ambassador. They are not successful, but she is personally attracted to Ben anyway. She asks him up to her hotel room, where they have sex.

Sam, Ben's mentor, congratulates him on dating Katerina. When Ben confesses feelings of inadequacy and inertia, Sam takes him for a spin in a Ferrari to encourage him to enjoy life. Ben later borrows the Ferrari to pick up Katerina, but visibly does not know how to drive it properly. When Katerina plays the Australian Open against Alicia Molik, Ben has a confrontation with Katerina's vocal father (Alex Menglet) in the audience. Katerina then turns down the Simpson brand deal and leaves for the next tournament in Dubai. It is later revealed that she comes out publicly as bisexual.

Ben then visits his father (Rob Carlton) at his workplace, a caravan sales dealership, and confides in him about his “midlife crisis". His father insists that it must be something closer to a "quarter life crisis." Meanwhile, Em and Nick return from a trip to Ko Samui, Thailand and announce that they are engaged. Ben congratulates them, but seems unsettled. Months go by and Ben continues to attend parties, meet women and work at his marketing job.

=== Alex in Melbourne ===
Alex returns to Melbourne and goes out clubbing with Ben, Em and Nick. Ben and Alex chat, but he awkwardly admits he has not replied to her emails or letters. Ben asks her out and they spend the following day on a date, meeting at the National Gallery of Victoria then walking through to Cooks' Cottage, the Royal Exhibition Building, the University of Melbourne and the Moroccan Soup Bar in Fitzroy, where she orders in Arabic. They kiss, and Ben claims he will visit her in Yemen. She returns to Yemen the same night.

=== Alex in Yemen ===
Five weeks later, Ben and Andy go on a skiing holiday to New Zealand. They go bungee jumping and sleep with more women they meet, but the trip is overshadowed by the fact that Ben is putting off going to Yemen. Ben returns to Melbourne and meets Nick and Em, who have moved into a new apartment. When Em realises Ben has not followed up contact with Alex, she calls him a “fucking idiot”, telling him she will no longer interfere with his life.

=== Alex in Melbourne ===
Two months later, Ben has revitalised the Simpson brand and earned Ken and Malcolm's respect, though he intends to leave that job soon and move onto something else. Ben then attends a Melbourne Cup function with his new model girlfriend, Kelly (Jodi Gordon), Nick and Em, Andy and his new girlfriend Cohali (Samantha Harris), and Jim. To Ben's surprise, Alex has returned from Yemen to attend Nick and Em's wedding and is also attending the Melbourne Cup function - with her new boyfriend, Nils (Byron J. Brochmann), a former Olympic bobsledder for Denmark who works for Médecins Sans Frontières. Ben is jealous again and leaves the night early. When Andy arrives home late, Ben broaches the topic of his dissatisfaction with life but finds that Andy has fallen asleep before he can answer.

Ben and Alex meet again at Cooks' Cottage, where he apologises for not staying in touch and promptly leaves. He returns to his apartment to find that Alex has arrived ahead of time and is there waiting for him. She scolds him for romanticising her in her absence, and in a tense moment, they kiss. She returns to Yemen.

=== Alex in Yemen ===
Sam throws a birthday party for his son and Ben attends. He confides in Sam about his dissatisfaction with life, mentioning that at age 27 he's never been in the same job for a year, dated a woman for more than three months or stayed in the same house for long either, and that he is about to move house yet again for no reason he understands. When Ben asks him how you know who “the one” is, Sam tells him that “there is no ‘the one’, you just make her ‘the one.’”

Ben plans to take Kelly on a romantic early morning hot air balloon ride, but when the time comes to board the balloon she reveals that she is angry about this as she considers it an empty gesture. They then break up. Meanwhile, Ben's mother graduates from the University of Melbourne with a Masters of Psychology and mentions during the graduation ceremony that she considers Ben to be a narcissist. Ben then attends Nick's buck's night, where Nick himself is the designated driver. In a private moment, Ben asks Nick how he knew Em was “the one.” Nick replies, “It's all about you.”

=== Alex in Melbourne ===
Alex returns from Yemen again for the wedding, where she and Ben meet again and Alex reveals that she has broken up with Nils. Ben gives a well-prepared best man speech in which he reflects on the nature of commitment. After everyone else leaves, Ben and Alex share a romantic dance together and later have sex at his apartment. In the morning, they reflect on their memories together and then discuss the potential future of their relationship. The conversation becomes tense again as Ben refuses to commit, and Alex scolds him for his inability to ask her to stay in Australia. She then leaves for Yemen again.

=== Alex in Yemen ===
Later, Ben's father helps Ben and Andy pack up their shared apartment to move to a new address, even though they have not decided where to move to yet. As they prepare to drive away with all their possessions loaded in the truck, Ben spontaneously decides that he will in fact stay at his current apartment and the three begin unpacking. Ben also tells Malcolm that he will stay at his job, and spontaneously gets on a plane to Yemen.

In Yemen, Ben arrives at Alex's "office" and asks her to be his girlfriend in stilted Arabic he has spent the last few months studying. She accepts, and they kiss. A photo of the two of them is seen framed in Ben's apartment.

In a mid-credits flashback scene, Ben nervously attempts to explain his spontaneous Yemen trip to the Australian Border Force, who suspect him of being a terrorist. He eventually wins them over and convinces them that his story about Alex is genuine. One of the staff members is an Arabic speaker who gives him some language tips before his flight. Another offers to tell him the “secret to life”, but the film cuts before the audience can find out what it is.

== Cast ==
- Josh Lawson as Ben North
- Rachael Taylor as Alex
- Daniel Henshall as Nick
- Felicity Ward as Emily
- Christian Clark as Andy
- Lachy Hulme as Sam
- Ed Kavalee as Jim
- David James as Malcolm
- Jodi Gordon as Kelly
- Rob Carlton as Ben's Dad
- Tracy Mann as Ben's Mum
- Alan Brough as Ken
- Liliya May as Katerina Sinova
- Chantelle Raleigh as Fleur
- Claudia Hruschka as Aleesha
- Emma-Louise Wilson as Katey
- Alex Menglet as Katerina's Dad
- Rob Sitch as Principal
- Sean Lynch as Balloon Assistant
- John Howard as Priest

== Theatrical release ==
The film was released on 9 February 2012. It posted a modest opening weekend at the local box office, which grossed $608,731 for Roadshow on 235 screens, giving it a screen average of $2,590. By the end of the first week, the film had grossed only A$917,000. By the end of its cinema run in Australia, the film had grossed only A$1.53 million, leaving the film a box-office failure when compared to the previous two feature films produced by Working Dog, namely The Castle (1997) which earned over $10 million and The Dish (2000) which grossed almost $18 million. Overall, the film ranked 102 on the list of most successful films at the Australian box office in 2012.

== Reception ==
The film received lukewarm reviews. Leigh Paatsch, writing in the Melbourne Herald-Sun, felt that the film's strongest point was the banter between the characters, which was funny and engaging, but Paatsch said that Lawson's central performance was marred at times by "an air of self-satisfied smarm" and the character's path to enlightenment was unfocused and unconvincing. He concluded, "And I sense that others who similarly fell hard for the soulful sincerity of The Castle and The Dish will feel a little quizzical about the comparative slickness of Any Questions for Ben?". On Rotten Tomatoes, the film has an aggregate score of 59% based on 10 positive and 7 negative critic reviews.

Tom Ryan in the Sydney Morning Herald wrote that the film was often very funny and singled out Rachael Taylor's performance for praise – "the camera loves her". As a romance, though, Ryan felt that film failed to convince. "The problem for the film-makers is maintaining dramatic interest whilst he [central character Ben] sorts out his quarter-life crisis. Their solutions, alas, aren't especially satisfying. And the endless montages of Melbourne [...] make our city look beautiful [...] but contribute nothing."

Sandra Hall, in the Melbourne Age, said that the film was bright and shiny and made Melbourne appear "dressed up in candy colours", but the film's attempts to generate humour were laboured and desperate, with an over-reliance on musical montages. "The whole thing made me nostalgic for Working Dog's sharper days".

Luke Buckmaster, writing on Crikey, was scathing in his review, saying the film had "blobs of writer's block offal masquerading as a storyline" along with an implausible relationship at its centre with no emotional connection between the two leads. "Working Dog have made precisely that – a dog".

However, Jim Schembri, also writing in the Age, praised the film as "very enjoyable, character-rich, and thoughtful".
