= Emma-Louise Wilson =

Australian actress

Emma-Louise Wilson is an Australian actress. She is best known for her role as Katie in the Logie Award and AACTA Award-winning comedy series Utopia. She also features in the ensemble for the comedy sketch show Kinne. Wilson played a minor role as Katey in the film Any Questions for Ben? (2012), where she was spotted by Rob Sitch and offered a role in Utopia. Wilson also played the role of Tenille in the wrestling zombie film From Parts Unknown: Fight Like a Girl (2015).

== Filmography ==
=== Film ===
Year	Title	Role	Notes
2012	Any Questions for Ben?	Katey	
2013	Metal Murder 3D	Alice	
2015	Fight Like a Girl	Tenille	
2016	Sheborg Massacre	The SheBorg	
2017	Creature Cabin	Wheels	
2019	Nova Star	Novan Marine	

=== Television ===
Year	Title	Role	Notes
2014–2015	Kinne	Various characters	12 episodes
2014–2023	Utopia	Katie	40 episodes
2016–2017	Pacific Heat	Kwong	13 episodes
2018	Romper Stomper	Female Exec in Car	Episode: "If Blood Should Stain the Wattle"
2019–2020	Wentworth	Officer Floyd / Liz Double / Narelle Double	6 episodes
2020	Halifax: Retribution	Pedestrian #2	Episode #1.4

== Personal life ==
Wilson was born in Melbourne, Australia. She is an alumna of Assumption College Kilmore, receiving its Rising Star award in 2018.
