= Daniel Armstrong (film director) =

Australian film director

- Born: Daniel Robert Armstrong; 28 August 1971 (age 54); Melbourne, Australia
- Occupations: Director, writer, editor, producer
- Years active: 1983–present

Daniel Armstrong is an Australian film director. Armstrong is also known for his work as a writer, producer and editor.

== Private life ==
Armstrong grew up in Melbourne, Australia, attending the private school Scotch College, Melbourne. He continued his studies at Melbourne University from 1990–1994 receiving a Bachelor of Commerce/Law and a Bachelor of Arts Honours Degree. After graduating Armstrong went on to travel, spending time in the UK, Eastern Europe, Scandinavia and America. Upon his return to Australia in 1998 he completed a post graduate diploma in Multimedia Studies from Swinburne University. Never having had any formal film school training, Armstrong credits his expertise to on-the-job experience.

Combining all aspects of his favourite movie genres Armstrong coined the term "Neo-Pulp" describing it as "lovingly embracing the most extreme, cliche, and supercilious elements of pop culture and pulp literature and putting them in a human context... It's not a spoof, it's not horror, it's not action, it's not sci-fi, it's not drama. It's all of these things. It's neo-pulp." Most of Armstrong's films fall under this category.

== Career ==
Armstrong first begun making films at the age of 12, his first film being "Star Wars vs Greyskull" on his parents 8mm camera. Since then Armstrong went on to create many more films often both writing and directing them. In 2013 he released his first feature film MurderDrome, and in 2015 came From Parts Unknown: Fight Like a Girl. From Parts Unknown was actually filmed before MurderDrome but was not released until later due to what Armstrong quoted as "post-production issues". Both were released on DVD by Monster Pictures.

== Filmography ==
Year	Film	Director	Producer	Writer	Editor	Notes
2010	Snake Eyes	check	check	check	check	Short film
2013	Metal Murder 3D	check	check	check		
2014	MurderDrome	check	check	check	check	
2015	From Parts Unknown: Fight Like a Girl	check	check	check	check	Also cinematographer
2016	Sheborg Massacre	check	check	check	check	MUFF Award - Special Jury Award
2017	Tarnation	check	check	check	check	
2018	Evil Fred				check	Filming
2021	Nova Star	check	check	check	check	Filming
