= Modern Love =

Modern Love may refer to:

== Film ==
- Modern Love (1918 film), a silent film starring Mae Murray
- Modern Love (1929 film), a part-talking film distributed by Universal Pictures
- Modern Love (1990 film), a film by Robby Benson
- Modern Love (2006 film), a film by Alex Frayne
- Modern Love (2008 film), a French film starring Stéphane Rousseau

== Music ==
- Modern Love, an electronic music label founded by Andy Stott

=== Albums ===
- Modern Love (Kids of 88 album), 2012
- Modern Love (Matt Nathanson album) or the title song, 2011
- Modern Love, by Whitehorse, 2021

=== Songs ===
- "Modern Love" (David Bowie song), 1983
- "Modern Love" (Peter Gabriel song), 1977
- "Modern Love", by All Time Low from Tell Me I'm Alive, 2023
- "Modern Love", by Courteneers from Mapping the Rendezvous, 2016
- "Modern Love", by Kish Mauve from Black Heart, 2009
- "Modern Love", by Peter Ivers from Terminal Love, 1974
- "Modern Love", by RuPaul from Born Naked, 2014

== Other media ==
- Modern Love (poetry collection), an 1862 collection of sonnets by George Meredith
- "Modern Love" (Degrassi: The Next Generation), a 2005 television episode
- "Modern Love" (Where the Heart Is), a 2000 television episode
- "Modern Love" (column), a column in The New York Times
  - Modern Love (TV series), an American streaming television series based on the column
  - Modern Love (podcast), a podcast based on the column

== See also ==
- Modern Lovers (disambiguation)
- Modern Love Chennai, Modern Love Mumbai and Modern Love Hyderabad, three Indian TV series based on the American series
