= Modern Love Amsterdam =

Dutch anthology television series

- Genre: Romantic comedy; Anthology
- Created by: Robert Alberdingk Thijm
- Based on: Modern Love
- Country of origin: Netherlands
- Original language: Dutch
- No. of seasons: 1
- No. of episodes: 6

Production
- Executive producers: Sabine Brian; John Carney
- Producers: Sabine Brian; Jonne Roos; Albert van Vuure
- Production locations: Amsterdam, Netherlands
- Production company: NL Film

Original release
- Network: Amazon Prime Video
- Release: 16 December 2022

Modern Love Amsterdam is a Dutch romantic comedy anthology television series. It is based on the American television series Modern Love, which itself is based on the weekly column of the same name published by The New York Times.

== Cast ==
=== Episode 1 ===
- Eva van de Wijdeven as Roos
- Sanne den Hartogh as Tobias
- Arjan Ederveen as George
- Mariana Aparicio as Kate
- Samora Bergtop as Sienney

=== Episode 2 ===
- Rifka Lodeizen as Katja
- Romijn Conen as Simon
- Matteo van der Grijn as Milko
- Whitney Sawyer as Hennie

=== Episode 3 ===
- Jonas Smulders as Benjamin Zwerver
- Jack Wouterse as Chris Zwerver
- Bart Harder as Alex Zwerver
- Jelle Mensink as Marius Zwerver
- Roos Ouwehand as Lies Zwerver

=== Episode 4 ===
- Werner Kolf as Dwayne
- Joy Wielkens as Marissa
- Lee-Mae Antoni as Ayra
- Jade Olieberg as Lauren

=== Episode 5 ===
- Ilke Paddenburg as Colette
- Hanna van Vliet as Naomi
- Fjodor Jozefzoon as Boaz
- Hannah Hoekstra as Ada

=== Episode 6 ===
- Yootha Wong-Loi-Sing as Lil Pastoors
- Fedja van Huêt as Guus
- Maarten Heijmans as Bruno Vervaart
- Kayen Thodé as Mick
- Vince Stolker as Troy
- Noortje Herlaar as Katelijne

== Episodes ==
No.	Title	Directed by	Written by	Original release date
1	"Butterflies" (Nachtvlinders)	Mustafa Duygulu	Anne Barnhoorn	16 December 2022
2	"Hold Me Close" (Hou me Vast)	Boudewijn Koole	Boudewijn Koole; Robert Alberdingk Thijm	16 December 2022
3	"The Big Questions" (De Grote Vragen)	Norbert ter Hall	Roos Ouwehand	16 December 2022
4	"In the Eye of the Storm" (In het oog van de storm)	Mijke de Jong	Esther Duysker	16 December 2022
5	"The Genie Out of the Bottle" (De Geest Uit De Fles)	Mijke de Jong	Maud Wiemeijer	16 December 2022
6	"The Glass Heart" (Het Glazen hart)	Mischa Kamp	Robert Alberdingk Thijm	16 December 2022

== Production ==
On 16 August 2022, Deadline reported that the American anthology series Modern Love was being remade for the Netherlands. The series, set in Amsterdam, was to be produced by Sabine Brian with Robert Alberdingk Thijm as showrunner. Filming took place over 49 days in various locations around Amsterdam.

It is the fourth remake of Modern Love to premiere, after Modern Love Mumbai, Modern Love Hyderabad, and Modern Love Tokyo; and is the first European remake of the series.

== Reception ==
Mark Moorman of de Volkskrant gave the series three out of five stars, noting that it "embraces the multi-colouredness of the city and love."
