= Lara Bazelon =

American academic and writer

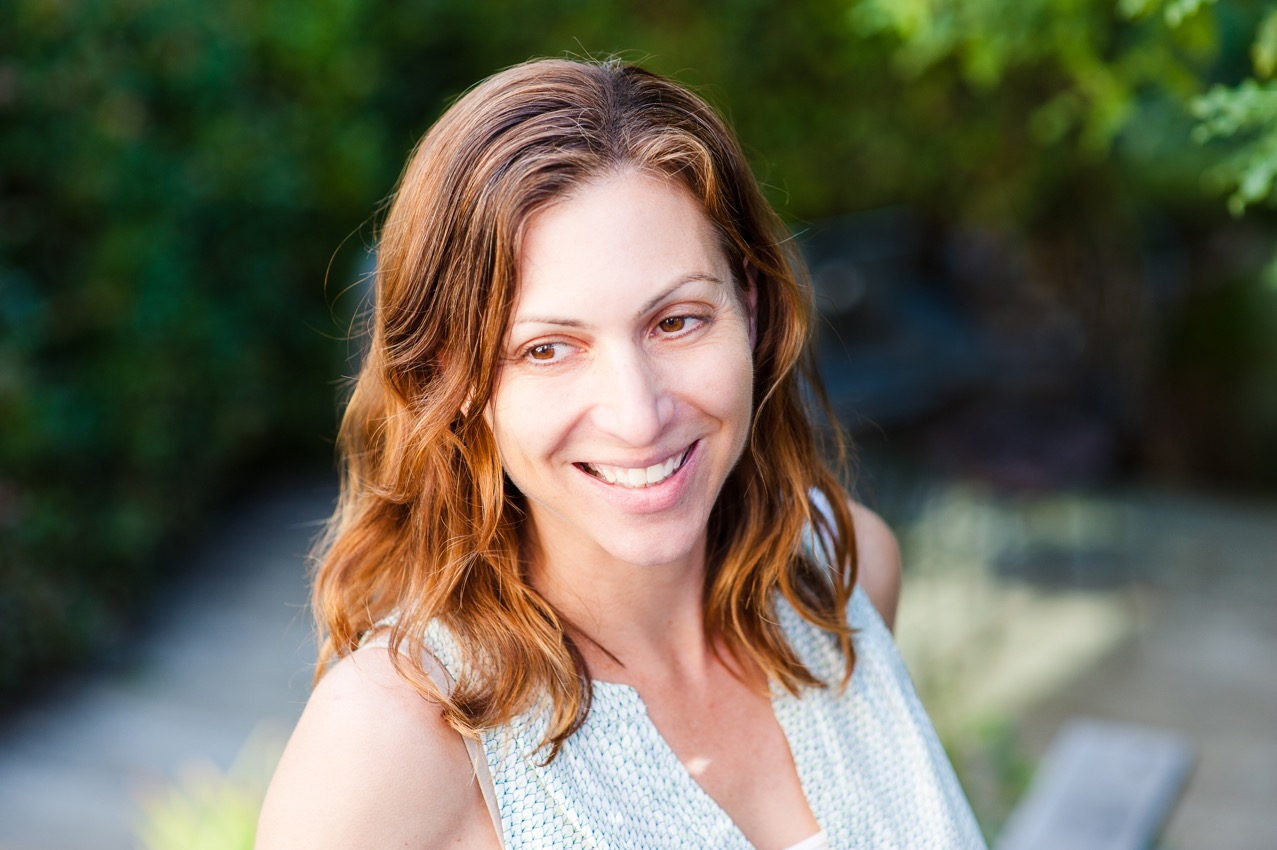
- Bazelon in 2015
- Born: February 14, 1974 (age 52)
- Education: Columbia University (BA) New York University (JD)
- Occupations: Law professor, journalist, essayist
- Employer: University of San Francisco
- Notable credit(s): The New York Times; Slate; The Atlantic
- Office: Barnett Chair in Trial Advocacy
- Relatives: David L. Bazelon (grandfather); Emily Bazelon (sister)

Lara Bazelon (born February 14, 1974) is an American academic and journalist. She is a law professor at the University of San Francisco School of Law where she holds the Barnett Chair in Trial Advocacy and directs the Criminal & Juvenile and Racial Justice Clinics. She is the former director of the Loyola Law School Project for the Innocent in Los Angeles. Her clinical work as a law professor focuses on the exoneration of the wrongfully convicted.

She is the author of two nonfiction books: Rectify: The Power of Restorative Justice After Wrongful Conviction (Beacon Press 2018) and Ambitious Like a Mother: Why Prioritizing Your Career is Good For Your Kids (Little Brown 2022), and the author of the novel A Good Mother (Hanover Sq. Press 2021).

== Early life and education ==
Bazelon grew up in Philadelphia. Her father is an attorney and her mother is a psychiatrist.

She attended Germantown Friends School, where she was on the tennis team. She has three sisters: Emily Bazelon, an award-winning New York Times journalist and author; Jill Bazelon, who founded an organization that provides financial literacy classes free of charge to low income high school students and individuals; and Dana Bazelon, senior policy counsel to Philadelphia District Attorney Larry Krasner. The Bazelon family are Jewish.

Bazelon is the granddaughter of David L. Bazelon, formerly a judge on the United States Court of Appeals for the District of Columbia Circuit, and second cousin twice removed of feminist Betty Friedan.

Bazelon graduated cum laude from Columbia University in 1996, and received her J.D. from NYU School of Law where she was an editor of the NYU Law Review. Her note, Exploding the Superpredator Myth, won the Paul D. Kaufman Memorial Award and was cited by Bryan Stevenson in his Supreme Court brief in Sullivan v. Florida, where he successfully argued that the Eighth Amendment forbade the sentencing of juveniles to life imprisonment without the possibility of parole for crimes committed before the age of 13. After law school Bazelon worked as a law clerk for the Honorable Harry Pregerson of the United States Court of Appeals for the Ninth Circuit.

== Academic career ==
After seven years as a trial attorney in the Office of the Federal Public Defender in Los Angeles, Bazelon was awarded a clinical teaching fellowship at the UC Hastings College of the Law. From 2012 to 2015, Bazelon was a visiting associate professor and the director of the Loyola Law School Project for the Innocent in Los Angeles. In 2017, Bazelon joined the faculty of the University of San Francisco School of Law as an associate professor and the director of the Criminal and Juvenile and Racial Justice Clinics. In 2019, she was awarded tenure. In 2020, she was awarded the Barnett Chair in Trial Advocacy.

== Exonerations ==
While leading the Loyola Project for the Innocent, Bazelon was the lead counsel for Kash Register, who was exonerated on November 7, 2013, for a murder he did not commit after 34 years imprisonment. Register won a $16.7 million judgment from the city and county of Los Angeles in 2016, the largest settlement in the history of Los Angeles.

From 2019 to 2021, Bazelon and her law students at the University of San Francisco School of Law represented Louisiana prisoner Yutico Briley Jr., who was sentenced to 60 years with no possibility of parole at the age of 19 for an armed robbery he did not commit. The story of Briley's exoneration — and the collaboration of Lara and her sister Emily Bazelon in helping to bring it about — was the cover story of the New York Times Magazine in July 2021, written by Emily Bazelon.

Joaquin Ciria was freed after the San Francisco District Attorney's Innocence Commission, chaired by Bazelon, reinvestigated Ciria's case and recommended that the District Attorney seek to overturn his conviction. San Francisco Superior Court Judge Brendon Conroy vacated Ciria's conviction on April 18, 2022, and he was released from jail on April 20, 2022, having serving 31 years in prison.

== Bar complaints ==
In 2018, Bazelon began filing bar complaints against prosecutors whom judges had found to have committed misconduct. But as Radley Balko wrote in the Washington Post, Bazelon met with no success: "none of the eight complaints resulted in significant disciplinary action." Bazelon told the Washington Post she was particularly troubled by the case of Jamal Trulove, who was wrongfully convicted due to the misconduct of Assistant District Attorney Linda Allen. After the Court of Appeal overturned Trulove's conviction, Allen was allowed to retry him. Following his acquittal, Trulove sued the city and county of San Francisco and received a $13.1 million judgment. The State Bar of California took no action against Allen in response to Bazelon's complaint. Represented by the law firm Jones Day, Bazelon took a writ to the California Supreme Court, which declined to hear the case by a vote of 5–1 with one justice recusing himself.

== Academic writing ==
Bazelon's scholarship examining issues at the intersection of criminal justice and ethics as well as restorative justice as an alternative to incarceration, has been published in The Fordham Law Review, the Hofstra Law Review, the Georgetown Journal of Legal Ethics, the Berkeley Journal of Criminal Law, the Ohio State Journal of Criminal Law, and the Journal of Criminal Law and Criminology. Bazelon is quoted frequently in national and local media as an expert on criminal justice issues. She serves as a voting member of the ABA Criminal Justice Section's Council, the policymaking body for the organization on criminal justice issues.

== Journalism ==
Bazelon writes regularly about criminal justice issues with a particular focus on how the legal system is affected by racism, sexism, and other biases. She has written for The Atlantic about the gender bias female trial lawyers face and how the felony murder rule disproportionately impacts women and people of color. Her long running series on wrongful convictions has appeared in Slate since 2015 and her Innocence Deniers article was Slate's cover story in 2018. A feminist and progressive Democrat, she also regularly draws criticism from the left for her critiques of other Democrats and progressive-leaning institutions. Her New York Times op-ed "Kamala Harris Was Not A 'Progressive Prosecutor'" sparked nationwide debate. Assessing the impact of Bazelon's critique, Politico wrote, "after a prominent law professor tore apart her record in a New York Times op-ed," Harris faced "months of criticism of [her career] as a district attorney and state attorney general, thwarting her efforts to win over reform-minded liberals." Bazelon has also drawn criticism for her support for the Title IX regulations promulgated by the Trump Administration, writing in another New York Times op-ed that they were necessary to provide due process protections for the accused following a lengthier article published in Politico Magazine. She and her students in the USF Racial Justice Clinic represent students of color accused of Title IX offenses who lack the means to hire an attorney.

Bazelon's article in New York Magazine, "Did David Simon Glorify Baltimore's Detectives?" which examined the role of officers who became characters in The Wire in contributing to wrongful convictions, will be re-printed in the forthcoming anthology Unspeakable Acts: True Tales of Crime, Murder, Deceit and Obsession (Ecco 2023) edited by Sarah Weinman.

Bazelon's often contrarian positions have led to media appearances across the political spectrum including NPR, MSNBC, CNN, Fox News, and the popular podcasts Pod Save the People, The Glenn Show, The Fifth Column, and The Unspeakable. She is a founding member of the Academic Freedom Alliance, a coalition of "college and university faculty members who are dedicated to upholding the principle of academic freedom."

== Personal essays ==
A divorced mother of two, Bazelon writes frequently about her family. In 2015, The New York Times published Bazelon's essay, "From Divorce, a Fractured Beauty", as a Modern Love column. The essay was also featured in the Modern Love podcast, read by the actress Molly Ringwald. Bazelon's other personal essays in the New York Times include "Who Said Game of Thrones Wasn't For Kids", "I Didn't Want Co-Sleeping to End", and "I've Picked My Job Over My Kids" which led to appearances on Good Morning America and the Tamron Hall Show. Her book, Ambitious Like A Mother: Why Prioritizing Your Career is Good for Your Kids, published in 2022, is an expansion on that thesis.

== Chesa Boudin ==
Bazelon was an early supporter of Chesa Boudin's campaign to become San Francisco District Attorney in 2019, and served as a member of his policy team. In 2020, Boudin appointed Bazelon to chair his newly created Innocence Commission, a panel of five experts serving pro bono to re-investigate credible claims of wrongful conviction and transmit its findings to the DA. In 2021, acting on the recommendation of the Innocence Commission, DA Boudin conceded that Joaquin Ciria, convicted of murder in San Francisco in 1991, was factually innocent.

During the campaign to recall Chesa Boudin, Bazelon was one of his most outspoken advocates. Her defenses of Boudin were quoted in numerous media outlets including The New York Times, The New Yorker, The Atlantic, and The San Francisco Chronicle.

== Personal life ==
Bazelon lives in San Francisco, California. She and her ex-husband, attorney Matthew Dirkes, share custody of their two children.

== Honors and awards ==
In 2020, Bazelon was elected to the American Law Institute.

In 2017, Bazelon was a Langeloth Fellow and Mesa Fellow writer in residence.

In 2016, Bazelon was a MacDowell writer in residence.
