= Elizabeth Banks filmography =

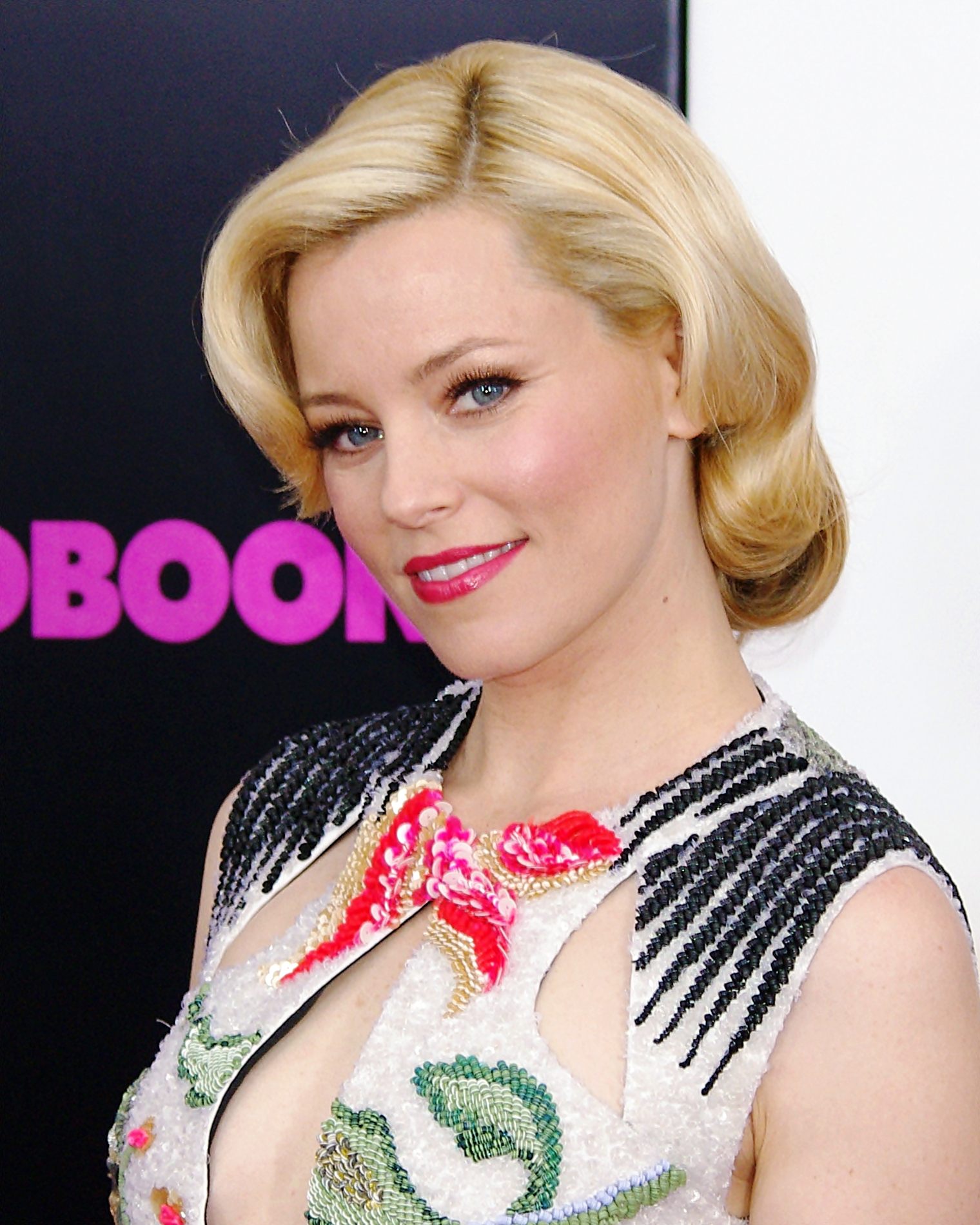
Banks at the What to Expect When You're Expecting premiere in May 2012

The following is the filmography of American actress and filmmaker Elizabeth Banks.

== Film ==
=== Acting roles ===
==== Feature films ====
Year	Title	Role	Notes
1998	Surrender Dorothy	Vicki	Credited as Elizabeth Casey
1999	Uninvited	Lady Reporter	Credited as Elizabeth Maresal Mitchell
2000	Shaft	Trey's Friend	Credited as Elizabeth Maresal Mitchell
2001	Wet Hot American Summer	Lindsay	
2001	Ordinary Sinner	Rachel	
2002	Spider-Man	Betty Brant	
2002	Swept Away	Debi	
2002	Catch Me If You Can	Lucy Forrest	
2003	The Trade	Sioux Sever	
2003	Seabiscuit	Marcela Howard	
2004	Spider-Man 2	Betty Brant	
2005	Heights	Isabel Lee	
2005	Sexual Life	Sarah	
2005	The Sisters	Nancy Pecket	
2005	The Baxter	Caroline Swann	
2005	The 40-Year-Old Virgin	Beth	
2005	Daltry Calhoun	May	
2006	Slither	Starla Grant	
2006	Invincible	Janet Cantrell	
2007	Spider-Man 3	Betty Brant	
2007	Meet Bill	Jess	
2007	Fred Claus	Charlene	
2008	Definitely, Maybe	Emily Jones	
2008	Meet Dave	Gina Morrison	
2008	Lovely, Still	Alex	
2008	W.	Laura Bush	
2008	Zack and Miri Make a Porno	Miriam "Miri" Linky	
2008	Role Models	Beth Jones	
2009	The Uninvited	Rachel Summers	
2010	The Next Three Days	Lara Brennan	
2011	The Details	Nealy Lang	
2011	Our Idiot Brother	Miranda Rochlin	
2012	Man on a Ledge	Lydia Mercer	
2012	The Hunger Games	Effie Trinket	
2012	What to Expect When You're Expecting	Wendy Cooper	
2012	People Like Us	Frankie Davis	
2012	Pitch Perfect	Gail Abernathy-McKadden	
2013	Movie 43	Amy	Segment: "Beezel"
2013	The Hunger Games: Catching Fire	Effie Trinket	
2014	Little Accidents	Diane Doyle	
2014	The Lego Movie	Lucy / Wyldstyle	Voice
2014	Walk of Shame	Meghan Miles	
2014	Every Secret Thing	Detective Nancy Porter	
2014	Love & Mercy	Melinda Ledbetter	
2014	The Hunger Games: Mockingjay – Part 1	Effie Trinket	
2015	Pitch Perfect 2	Gail Abernathy-McKadden-Feinberger	Also producer and director
2015	Magic Mike XXL	Paris	
2015	The Hunger Games: Mockingjay – Part 2	Effie Trinket	
2017	Power Rangers	Rita Repulsa	
2017	Pitch Perfect 3	Gail Abernathy-McKadden-Feinberger	Also producer
2018	The Happytime Murders	Jenny Peterson	
2019	The Lego Movie 2: The Second Part	Lucy / Wyldstyle	Voice
2019	Brightburn	Tori Breyer	
2019	Charlie's Angels	Rebekah Bosley	Also producer, director, and writer
2020	Eat Wheaties!	Herself	Voice, uncredited cameo
2022	Call Jane	Joy	
2023	The Beanie Bubble	Robbie	
2023	Migration	Pam	Voice
2024	A Mistake	Liz Taylor	
2024	Skincare	Hope Goldman	Also executive producer
2026	Gail Daughtry and the Celebrity Sex Pass	Herself	Cameo
2026	DreamQuil	Carol	Also producer
2026	Mighty Mary	Narrator	Documentary film, voice, also executive producer

==== Short films ====
Year	Title	Role	Notes
2009	Big Breaks	Starlet	
2011	Just a Little Heart Attack	Woman	
2013	Face in the Crowd	Face	
2015	Uber for Jen	Jen	
2017	Asteroids!	Cheez	Voice
2019	Ru's Angels	Rebekah Bosley	

=== Directing, producing and writing ===
==== Feature films ====
Year	Title	Director	Producer	Writer
2009	Surrogates	No	Executive	No
2012	Pitch Perfect	No	Yes	No
2013	Movie 43	Yes (Note: Directed the "Middle School Date" segment.)	No	No
2015	Pitch Perfect 2	Yes	Yes	No
2017	The Most Hated Woman in America	No	Yes	No
2017	Pitch Perfect 3	No	Yes	No
2019	Charlie's Angels	Yes	Yes	Yes
2023	Cat Person	No	Executive	No
2023	Cocaine Bear	Yes	Yes	No
2023	Cocaine Bear: The True Story	No	Executive	No
2023	Bottoms	No	Yes	No
2024	Skincare	No	Executive	No
2026	DreamQuil	No	Yes	No
2026	Mighty Mary	No	Executive	No

==== Short films ====
Year	Title	Director	Producer	Notes
2011	Just a Little Heart Attack	Yes	No	
2017	Yours Sincerely, Lois Weber	No	Executive	Documentary short

== Television ==
=== Acting credits ===
Year	Title	Role	Notes
1999	All My Children	Rosalie	Episode: "22 November 1999"
1999	Third Watch	Elaine Elchisak	Episode: "Patterns" (credited as Elizabeth Maresal Mitchell)
2000	Sex and the City	Catherine	Episode: "Politically Erect" (credited as Elizabeth Maresal Mitchell)
2001	Law & Order: Special Victims Unit	Jaina Tobias Jansen	Episode: "Sacrifice"
2002	Without a Trace	Clarissa	Episode: "Snatch Back"
2005	Stella	Tamara	Episode: "Meeting Girls"
2006–2009	Scrubs	Dr. Kim Briggs	17 episodes
2007–2008	Wainy Days	Shelly	3 episodes
2007–2008	American Dad!	Becky Arangino / Lisa Silver	Voice, 3 episodes
2008	Comanche Moon	Maggie Tilton	3 episodes
2009–2020	Modern Family	Sal	7 episodes
2010–2012	30 Rock	Avery Jessup	15 episodes
2012	Family Guy	Pam Fishman	Voice, episode: "Into Fat Air"
2012	Robot Chicken	Mrs. Claus / Scarlett	Voice, episode: "Robot Chicken's ATM Christmas Special"
2012	Comedy Bang! Bang!	Herself	Episode: "Elizabeth Banks Wears a Red Dress"
2013	Timms Valley	Beth Billings-Timms	Voice, pilot
2014	Phineas and Ferb	Grulinda	Voice, episode: "Imperfect Storm"
2015	Resident Advisors	Doctor	Episode: "Motivational Speaker"
2015	Wet Hot American Summer: First Day of Camp	Lindsay	6 episodes
2015	Moonbeam City	Chief Pizzaz Miller	Voice, 10 episodes
2015	The Muppets	Herself	2 episodes
2015	Saturday Night Live	Herself / Host	Episode: "Elizabeth Banks / Disclosure"
2017	Wet Hot American Summer: Ten Years Later	Lindsay	5 episodes
2017	Curb Your Enthusiasm	Herself	Episode: "A Disturbance in the Kitchen"
2017	The Magical Wand Chase: A Sesame Street Special	Bird-Lady	Television special
2019	Random Acts	Vex	Voice, episode: "The Phantom Thief"
2019–present	Press Your Luck	Herself / Host	Game show
2020	Mrs. America	Jill Ruckelshaus	9 episodes
2020	The Red Nose Day Special	Herself	Television special
2020	COVID Is No Joke	Herself	Television special
2022	The Boys	Herself	Episode: "Herogasm"
2023	The Simpsons	Persephone Odair	Voice, episode: "Thirst Trap: A Corporate Love Story"
2025	The Better Sister	Nicky Macintosh	8 episodes
2026	The Miniature Wife	Lindy	Main role
2026	Running Wild with Bear Grylls	Herself	Episode: "Bear with Elizabeth Banks"

=== Executive producer ===
Year	Title	Notes
2015	Resident Advisors	7 episodes
2017	The Trustee	Pilot
2018	Project 13	Pilot
2019–2021	Shrill	22 episodes
2019–present	Press Your Luck	Game show
2022	Pitch Perfect: Bumper in Berlin	Also co-creator, 6 episodes
2025	The Better Sister	8 episodes
2026	The Miniature Wife	10 episodes
TBA	DC Super Hero High	Upcoming series

== Video games ==
Year	Title	Role	Notes
2004	Spider-Man 2	Betty Brant	Likeness only
2007	Spider-Man 3	Betty Brant	Likeness only
2014	The Lego Movie Videogame	Lucy / Wyldstyle	Archival audio
2015	Lego Dimensions	Lucy / Wyldstyle	

== Music videos ==
Year	Title	Artist(s)	Role	Ref.
2016	"Fight Song"	Various Artists	Herself / Singer	
2016	"Holy Shit (You Got to Vote)"	Various Artists	Herself	
2018	"Girls Like You" (Original, Volume 2 and Vertical Video versions)	Maroon 5 featuring Cardi B	Herself	
2018	"Crushin' It"	The Slay Team	Mogul Mama	
2019	"Don't Call Me Angel" (Original and Lyric Video versions)	Ariana Grande, Miley Cyrus and Lana Del Rey	Rebekah Bosley	
2020	"What's Your Name"	The Harvard Krokodiloes	Herself	
2020	"Love On Top"	Cast of Pitch Perfect	Gail Abernathy-McKadden-Feinberger	

== Theme park attractions ==
Year	Title	Role	Notes
2016	The Lego Movie: 4D – A New Adventure	Lucy / Wyldstyle	Voice
2019	The Lego Movie: Masters of Flight	Lucy / Wyldstyle	Voice, also known as "Emmet's Flying Adventure"
