= Emily Bazelon =

American journalist (born 1971)

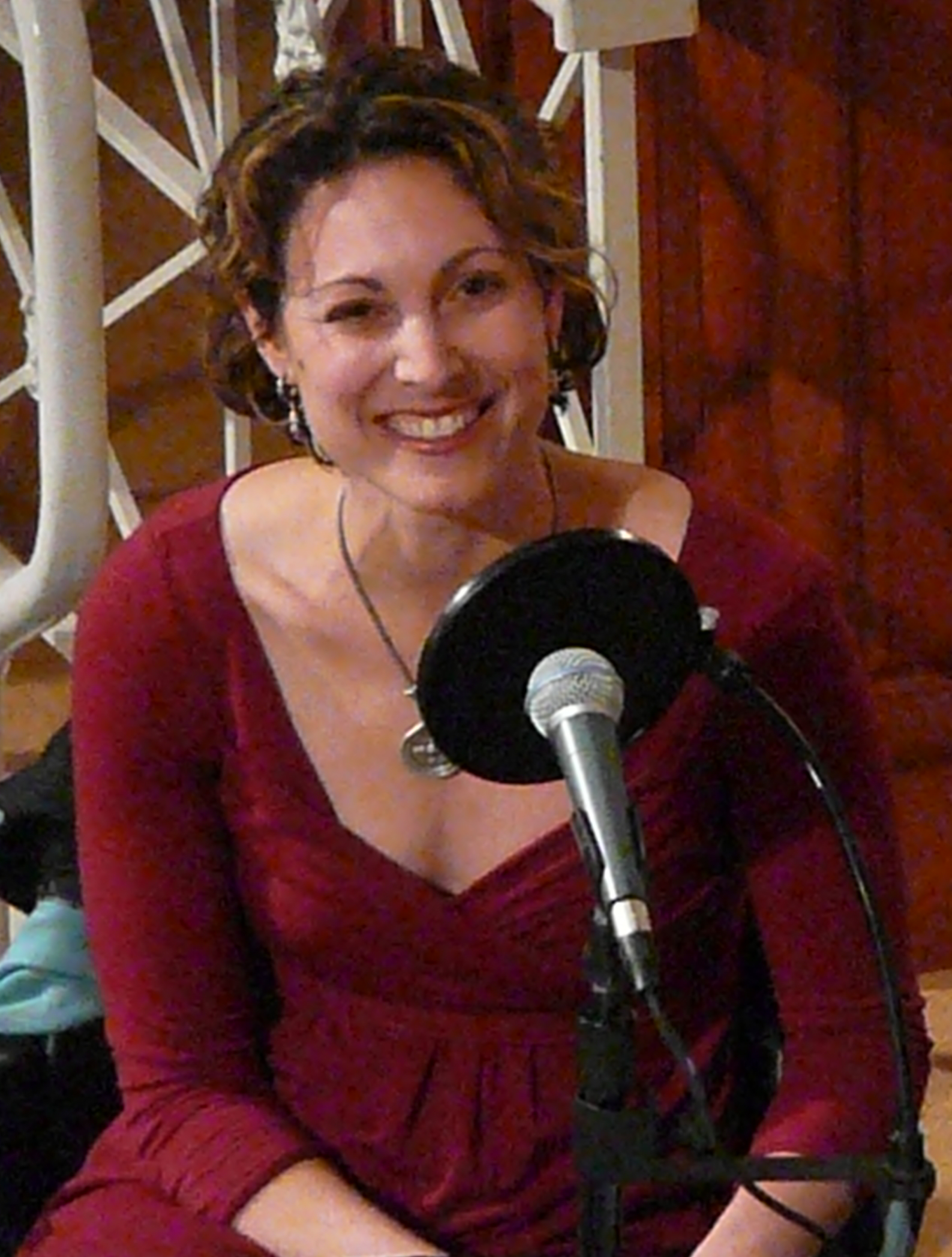
- Bazelon recording the Slate Political Gabfest in 2009
- Born: March 4, 1971 (age 55)
- Education: Yale University (BA, JD)
- Occupation: Journalist
- Notable credit(s): Slate; The New York Times Magazine
- Spouse: Paul Sabin
- Children: 2
- Relatives: Lara Bazelon (sister); David L. Bazelon (grandfather)

Emily Bazelon (born March 4, 1971) is an American journalist. She is a staff writer for The New York Times Magazine, a senior research fellow at Yale Law School, and co-host of the Slate podcast Political Gabfest. She is a former senior editor of Slate. Her work as a writer focuses on law, women, and family issues. She has written two national bestsellers published by Penguin Random House: Sticks and Stones: Defeating the Culture of Bullying and Rediscovering the Power of Character and Empathy (2013) and Charged: The New Movement to Transform American Prosecution and End Mass Incarceration (2019). Charged won the 2020 Los Angeles Times Book Prize in the Current Interest category, and the 2020 Silver Gavel Award from the American Bar Association. It was also the runner up for the J. Anthony Lukas Book Prize from Columbia University and the Nieman Foundation, and a finalist for the Helen Bernstein Book Award for Excellence in Journalism from the New York Public Library.

== Early life and education ==
Bazelon was born on March 4, 1971, and grew up in Philadelphia. Her father was an attorney and her mother was a psychiatrist. She attended Germantown Friends School, where she was on the tennis team. She has three sisters: Jill Bazelon, who founded an organization that provides financial literacy classes free of charge to low-income high school students and individuals in several cities; Lara Bazelon, an associate professor at the University of San Francisco School of Law and prominent advocate for overturning wrongful convictions; and Dana Bazelon, senior policy counsel to Philadelphia district attorney Larry Krasner. Her family is Jewish and not especially religious; she said in an interview, "I was raised to see Judaism in terms of ethical precepts."

Bazelon is the granddaughter of David L. Bazelon, formerly a judge on the United States Court of Appeals for the District of Columbia Circuit, and second cousin twice removed of feminist Betty Friedan.

Bazelon graduated from Yale College in 1993, where she was managing editor of The New Journal. She received her J.D. from Yale Law School in 2000 and was an editor of the Yale Law Journal. In 2004, she was made a Soros Justice Media Fellow by Open Society Foundations. She held the Dorot Fellowship in Israel from 1993 to 1994. After law school she worked as a law clerk for Judge Kermit Lipez of the United States Court of Appeals for the First Circuit.

== Journalism career ==
Bazelon is a writer for The New York Times Magazine and former senior editor of Slate. She has written on subjects such as voting rights, the Hamdan v. Rumsfeld Guantanamo detainee due process trial and the alleged post-abortion syndrome. Her work as a writer focuses on law, women, and family issues.

Before joining Slate, Bazelon was a senior editor of Legal Affairs. Her writing has also appeared in The Atlantic, Mother Jones, The Washington Post, The Boston Globe, The New Republic, and other publications.

Bazelon is also a senior research scholar in Law and the Truman Capote Fellow for Creative Writing and Law at Yale Law School. Bazelon is affiliated with the Law and Media Program of Yale Law School.

Between 2012 and 2014, Bazelon made eight appearances on The Colbert Report on Comedy Central to discuss the Supreme Court and also anti-bullying issues.

=== Writing on bullying ===
Bazelon wrote a series on bullying and cyberbullying for Slate, called "Bull-E". She was nominated for the 2011 Michael Kelly Award for her story "What Really Happened to Phoebe Prince?" The three-part article is about the suicide of Phoebe Prince, a 15-year-old girl who committed suicide in South Hadley, Massachusetts, in January 2010, and the decision by the local prosecutor to bring criminal charges against six teenagers in connection with this death. The Michael Kelly Award, sponsored by the Atlantic Media Co., "honors a writer or editor whose work exemplifies a quality that animated Michael Kelly's own career: the fearless pursuit and expression of truth." Bazelon's series also sparked heated reaction and a response from district attorney Elizabeth Scheibel, who brought the charges against the six teenagers.

Bazelon authored a book about bullying and school climate published by Random House, titled Sticks and Stones: Defeating the Culture of Bullying and Rediscovering the Power of Character and Empathy. It received a front page The New York Times Book Review review, which called the book "intelligent" and "rigorous", and described the author as "nonjudgmental in a generous rather than simply neutral way," and "a compassionate champion for justice in the domain of childhood’s essential unfairness." In The Wall Street Journal, Meghan Cox Gurdon called Sticks and Stones a "humane and closely reported exploration of the way that hurtful power relationships play out in the contemporary public-school setting".

=== Writing on abortion ===
Bazelon has reported critically on the anti-abortion movement and opponents of legal abortion, including "pro-life feminists" and proponents of the concept of post-abortion syndrome, while being supportive of abortion providers and abortion-rights federal judges. She has described crisis pregnancy centers as being "all about bait-and-switch" and "falsely maligning" the abortion procedure. Bazelon has discussed her support for legal abortion on the Double X blog.

=== Writing on criminal justice ===
In 2018 and 2019, Bazelon published a number of articles on criminal justice reform. Her book Charged focuses on the role of prosecutors, the history of "tough on crime" politics in elections for that office, and the new generation of reformist prosecutors. David Lat in the New York Times called it a "persuasive indictment of prosecutorial excess".

=== Ruth Bader Ginsburg interview controversy ===
In July 2009, the New York Times Magazine published Bazelon's interview with U.S. Supreme Court Justice Ruth Bader Ginsburg. Discussing her view of Roe v. Wade in 1973, Ginsburg commented, "Frankly I had thought that at the time Roe was decided, there was concern about population growth and particularly growth in populations that we don't want to have too many of. So that Roe was going to be then set up for Medicaid funding for abortion."

Bazelon did not ask any follow-up question to what some interpreted as Ginsburg endorsing a eugenics-based rationale for legalized abortion, i.e., as a remedy for "populations that we don't want to have too many of." Bazelon was criticized by some conservative commentators for not doing so. Bazelon responded to the criticism, stating that she is "imperfect" and did not ask a follow-up question because she believed that Ginsburg's use of "we" had referred to "some people at the time, not [Ginsburg] herself or a group that she feels a part of."

The interview was cited in the United States House of Representatives' Committee Report in support of the Prenatal Nondiscrimination Act of 2012.

=== Transgender article controversy ===
In June 2022, Bazelon published an article in The New York Times on gender-affirming health-care, titled "The Battle Over Gender Therapy". Bazelon interviewed parents from gender-critical organization Genspect who defined the rise in transgender children as a "gender cult" and mass craze, "suggesting that exposure to transgender kids, education about trans people, and trans ideas on the internet could spread transness to others". Some parents from Genspect stated transgender people should not be able to transition until the age of 25. The article also referenced a Substack newsletter by an anonymous Genspect parent titled "It's Strategy People!" about how the organisation gets its perspective into news media by purposefully not referring to transgender children as "mentally ill" or "deluded".

PinkNews accused the article of "uncritically platform[ing] gender-critical group Genspect" and of spreading "vile rhetoric".

The article was covered on The Brian Lehrer Show on WNYC as part of "a debate from within the medical community that provides care for trans teenagers who seek to transition" and on Press Play on KCRW, which pointed out that "a growing right-wing backlash to gender-affirming care further complicates the debate."

The article was also used in legal cases involving transgender health-care. In February, 2022, Texas Governor Greg Abbott directed state agencies to investigate and limit gender-affirming health-care for transgender minors. In a subsequent lawsuit challenging this directive, the state of Texas hired controversial sexologist James Cantor as an expert witness. In his report, Cantor cited Bazelon's article as supporting evidence. The article was also cited approvingly by seventeen Republican state Attorneys General supporting the State of Florida's move to bar gender therapy or transitional treatment from being reimbursed with federal Medicaid Funds; these states are Alabama, Arkansas, Georgia, Indiana, Iowa, Kentucky, Louisiana, Mississippi, Missouri, Montana, Nebraska, North Dakota, South Carolina, Tennessee, Texas and Utah.

In 2023, the Missouri Attorney General cited the article in an emergency order to implement a de facto ban on transgender health-care for all ages.

== Personal life ==
Bazelon lives in New Haven, Connecticut, with her husband Paul Sabin, a professor of history and American studies at Yale. They are members of a Reform synagogue.

== Honors and awards ==
Bazelon was elected to the American Academy of Arts and Sciences in 2019.

In 2020, Bazelon's book Charged won the Los Angeles Times Book Prize in the current interest category and the Silver Gavel Award from the American Bar Association. It was also a finalist for the J. Anthony Lukas Book Prize and the Helen Bernstein Book Award for Excellence in Journalism from the New York Public Library.

== Selected Publications ==
Books

- Sticks and Stones: Defeating the Culture of Bullying and Rediscovering the Power of Character and Empathy, Random House, 2013
- Charged: The New Movement to Transform American Prosecution and End Mass Incarceration, Random House, 2019
