= Modern Lovers (disambiguation) =

The Modern Lovers were an American rock band.

Modern Lovers may also refer to:

== Music ==
- The Modern Lovers (album), a 1976 album by the band
- Modern Lovers 88, a 1987 album by Jonathan Richman and the Modern Lovers
- "Modern Lovers", a 1982 song by Fay Ray
- "Modern Lovers", a 1986 song by Sandy Marton

== Other uses ==
- Modern Lovers (novel), a 2016 novel by Emma Straub
- Modern Lovers, a 1989–1990 photographic exhibition and 1990 book by Bettina Rheims

== See also ==
- Modern Love (disambiguation)
