= Elizabeth Banks =

American actress and filmmaker (born 1974)

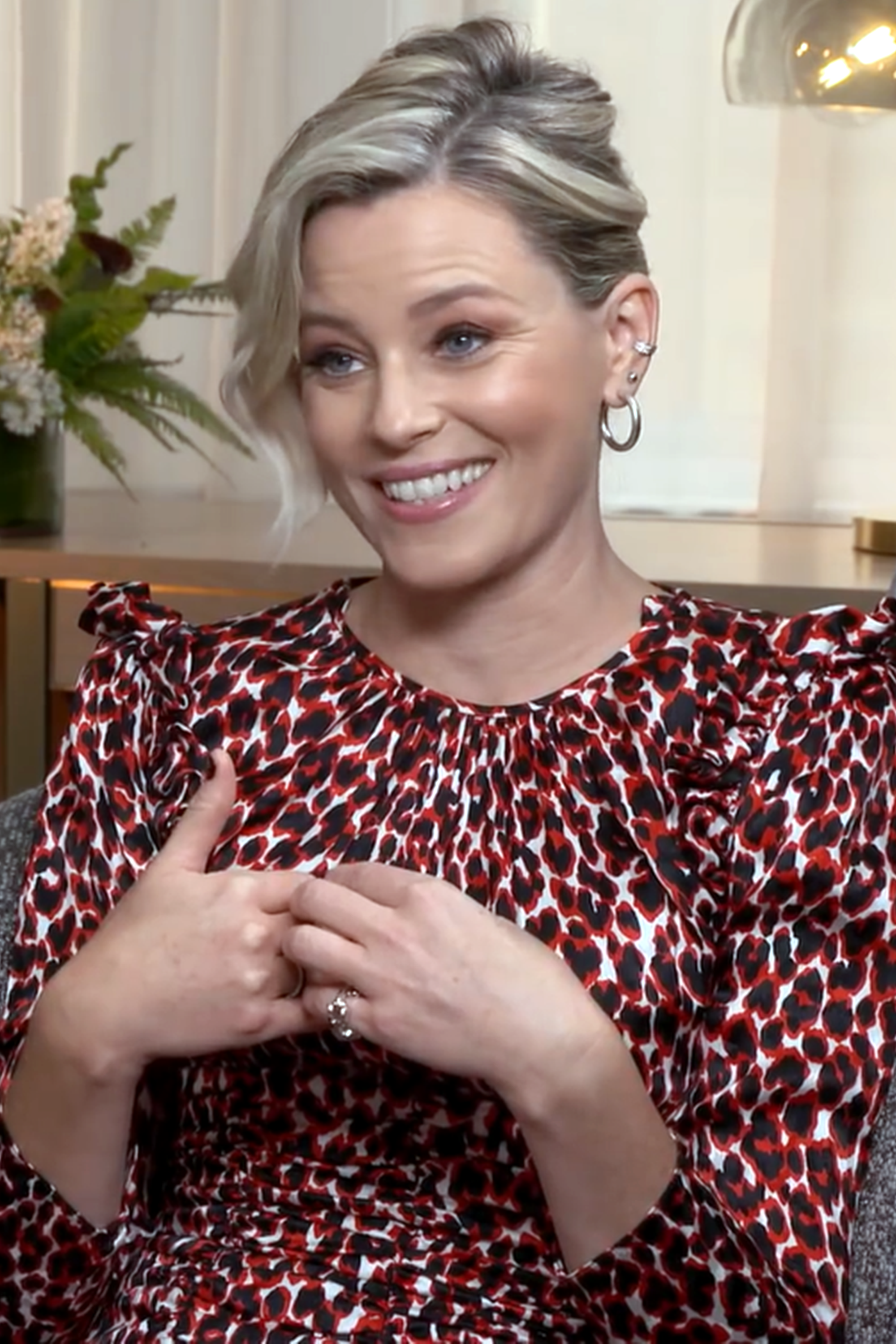
- Banks in 2019
- Born: Elizabeth Mitchell; February 10, 1974 (age 52); Pittsfield, Massachusetts, U.S.
- Education: University of Pennsylvania (BA); American Conservatory Theater (MFA)
- Occupations: Actress; producer; writer; director
- Years active: 1998–present
- Works: Full list
- Spouse: Max Handelman (m. 2003)
- Children: 2

Elizabeth Banks (née Mitchell; February 10, 1974) is an American actress and filmmaker. She is known for playing Effie Trinket in The Hunger Games film series (2012–2015) and an ICCA commentator in the Pitch Perfect film series (2012–2017). She made her directorial film debut with Pitch Perfect 2 (2015), whose $69 million opening-weekend gross set a record for a first-time director. She directed the action comedy Charlie's Angels (2019) and the black comedy horror film Cocaine Bear (2023). Banks founded the film and television production company Brownstone Productions in 2002 with her husband, Max Handelman.

Banks made her film debut in the low-budget independent film Surrender Dorothy (1998). She has appeared in films such as Wet Hot American Summer (2001), Sam Raimi's Spider-Man trilogy (2002–2007), Seabiscuit (2003), The 40-Year-Old Virgin (2005), Slither (2006), Invincible (2006), Zack and Miri Make a Porno (2008), Role Models (2008), The Next Three Days (2010), Man on a Ledge (2012), What to Expect When You're Expecting (2012), Movie 43 (2013), The Lego Movie film series (2014–2019), Love & Mercy (2014), Walk of Shame (2014), Magic Mike XXL (2015), Power Rangers (2017), Brightburn (2019), Call Jane (2022), Migration (2023), and Skincare (2024).

On television, Banks had a recurring role as Avery Jessup on the NBC sitcom 30 Rock (2010–2012), which earned her two Primetime Emmy Award nominations. She had recurring roles on the comedy series Scrubs (2006–2009) and Modern Family (2009–2020), the latter of which earned her a third Primetime Emmy Award nomination. She also starred in the Netflix miniseries Wet Hot American Summer: First Day of Camp (2015) and Wet Hot American Summer: Ten Years Later (2017). Banks began hosting the ABC revival of the game show Press Your Luck in 2019.

== Early life and education ==
Elizabeth Banks was born Elizabeth Mitchell on February 10, 1974 in Pittsfield, Massachusetts, and grew up there, the eldest of four children of Ann (née Wallace) and Mark P. Mitchell. Her father, a Vietnam War veteran, was a factory worker for General Electric and her mother worked in a bank. She describes her family as "very meat-and-potatoes, old-school Irish Catholic." Growing up, she played softball and rode horses. She was in Little League when she broke her leg sliding into third base. She then tried out for the school play, which was her start in acting.

She graduated from Pittsfield High School in 1992, and is a member of the Massachusetts Junior Classical League. She attended the University of Pennsylvania in Philadelphia, where she was a member of the Delta Delta Delta sorority and was elected to the Friars Senior Society. She graduated magna cum laude in 1996, majoring in communications and minoring in theater arts.

In 1998, she graduated from the American Conservatory Theater in San Francisco, earning an MFA degree.

== Career ==
=== 1998–2005: Early career and breakthrough ===
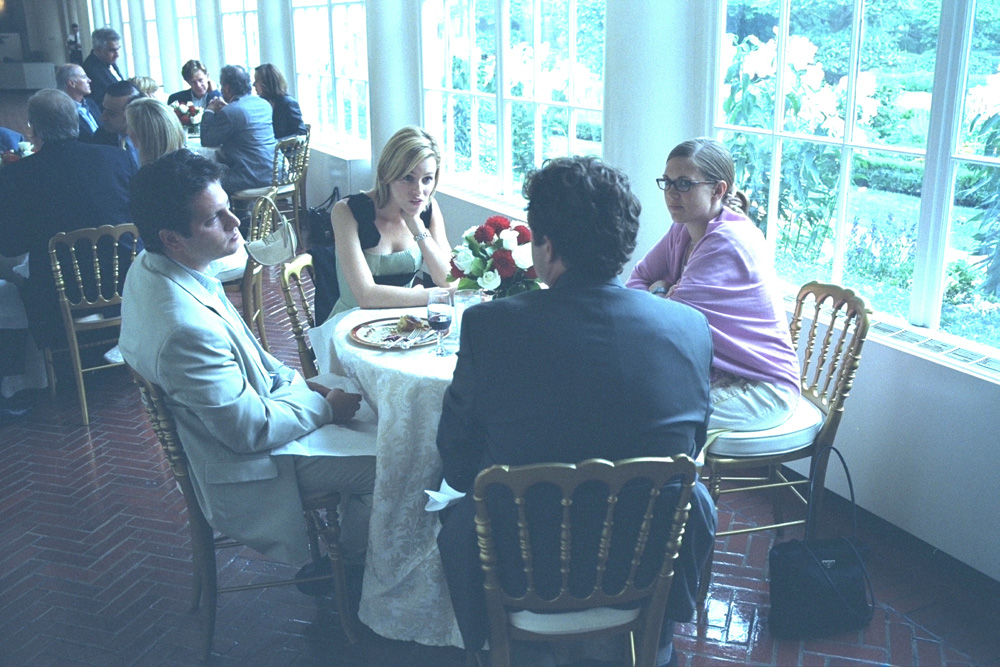
Banks (upper) at the Seabiscuit screening at the White House, July 2003

Banks changed her name upon joining the Screen Actors Guild, as actress Elizabeth Mitchell was already registered in the union under that name.

After auditioning in New York, she was offered a role on the soap opera Santa Barbara. Taking the role would have required her to quit her education at the American Conservatory Theater, and as she had taken out student loans to complete her degree, she declined the offer. She made her acting debut in the 1998 independent film Surrender Dorothy as Elizabeth Casey, and appeared in various films over the next seven years, including Wet Hot American Summer (2001), Swept Away (2002) and Seabiscuit (2003). Her most notable role up to that point was Betty Brant in Sam Raimi's Spider-Man trilogy (2002–2007).

In 2002, Banks set up her own production company, Brownstone Productions, with her future husband, Max Handelman.

Banks gained more prominent widespread exposure with her role in the 2005 comedy film The 40-Year-Old Virgin. In August 2005, at the Williamstown Theatre Festival, she starred in William Inge's Bus Stop as Cherie, the aspiring nightclub singer. Jeffrey Borak wrote that Banks' portrayal was acted "with poise, clarity and a shrewd feel for Cherie's complexities. Her performance is all of a piece and in harmony, stylistically, with the performances around her." In 2005, she appeared on the series Stella, and in May 2006, she had a role in the season five finale of the NBC sitcom Scrubs as Dr. Kim Briggs, the love interest of J.D. (Zach Braff). Banks appeared throughout seasons six, seven, and eight as a recurring guest star.

=== 2006–2014: Further success and recognition ===
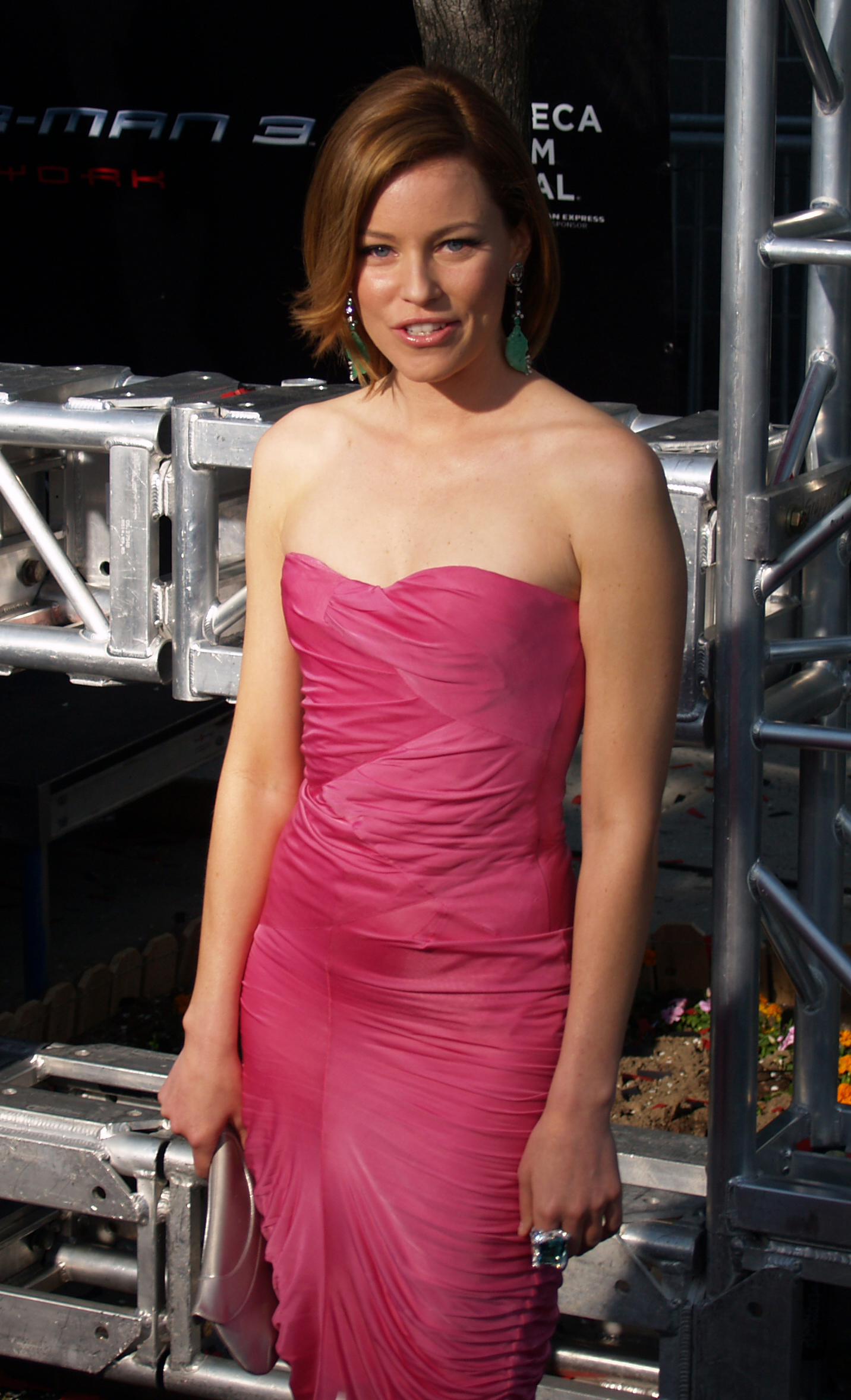
Banks at the premiere of Spider-Man 3 at the Tribeca Festival, April 2007

In 2006, Banks appeared in the American football drama film Invincible, in which she played Mark Wahlberg's love interest. Later, she and co-star Wahlberg were nominated for the "Best Kiss" award at the MTV Movie Awards. In the same year, she landed the starring role in the comedy-horror film Slither. In 2007, Banks played the female lead in the comedy film Meet Bill, alongside Aaron Eckhart and Jessica Alba. That same year, she had a small role as Santa's little helper, Charlyne, in the Christmas comedy film Fred Claus, co-starring Vince Vaughn and Paul Giamatti. In 2008, she played the ex-wife of Ryan Reynolds’ character and mother to his daughter in the comedy film Definitely, Maybe alongside Isla Fisher and Rachel Weisz, starred with Seth Rogen as the eponymous female lead in the Kevin Smith comedy Zack and Miri Make a Porno, and played United States First Lady Laura Bush in W., Oliver Stone's biopic of George W. Bush.

In 2009, Banks appeared in the horror film The Uninvited, a remake of the South Korean film A Tale of Two Sisters. The film was about an intrusive stepmother who makes life miserable for the teen daughters of her new husband. Banks based her character, Rachel, on Rebecca De Mornay's character in The Hand That Rocks the Cradle. "It was very important to me that every line reading I gave could be interpreted two ways," says Banks of her role, "When you go back through the movie you can see that".

Banks is a frequent co-star of actor Paul Rudd, the two having appeared in five films together (Wet Hot American Summer, The Baxter, The 40-Year-Old Virgin, Role Models, and Our Idiot Brother). She is also a frequent co-star of actor Tobey Maguire, the two having also appeared in five films together (Spider-Man, Seabiscuit, Spider-Man 2, Spider-Man 3, and The Details). Banks was cast as the love interest of Jack Donaghy (Alec Baldwin) in the fourth season of the Emmy Award-winning sitcom 30 Rock. Intended to appear in four episodes in 2010, Banks went on to become a recurring character with 13 appearances by the end of the fifth season, including her marriage in the episode "Mrs. Donaghy". Her performance in season five earned her a nomination for Primetime Emmy Award for Outstanding Guest Actress in a Comedy Series for the 63rd Primetime Emmy Awards.

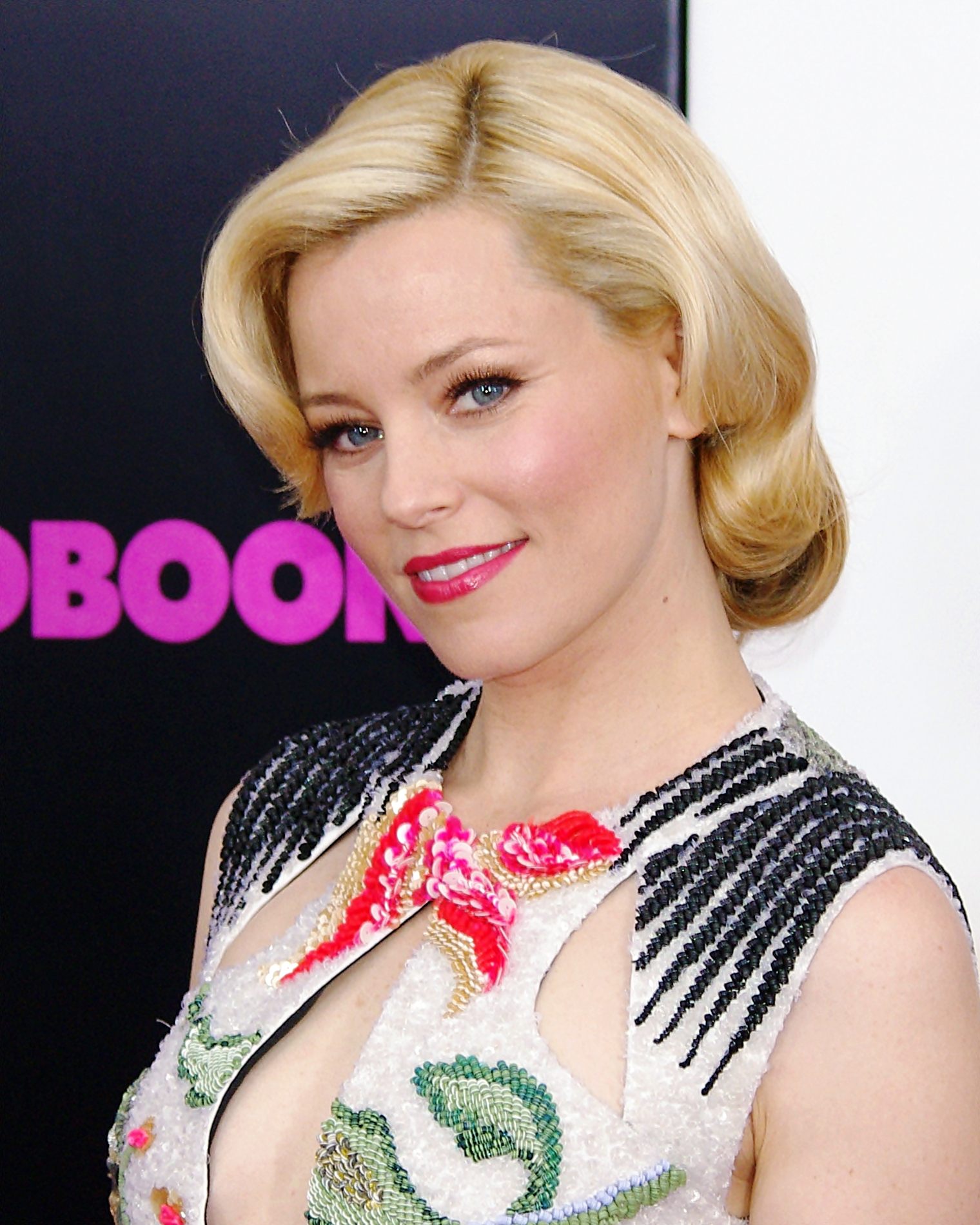
Banks at the premiere of What To Expect When You're Expecting at the AMC Lincoln Square Theater in Manhattan, May 2012

In 2012, Banks starred in the romantic comedy film What to Expect When You're Expecting and the action film Man on a Ledge. She also starred as Gail Abernathy-McKadden in the musical comedy film Pitch Perfect, which became a critical and commercial success. In 2013, she directed and starred in separate segments of Movie 43, a critically panned comedy anthology film. Banks starred in the science fiction adventure film The Hunger Games (2012), playing Effie Trinket, a woman from "The Capitol" who escorts the District 12 tributes to the annual Hunger Games. She went on to reprise the role in the sequel films The Hunger Games: Catching Fire (2013), The Hunger Games: Mockingjay – Part 1 (2014), and The Hunger Games: Mockingjay – Part 2 (2015). Banks co-starred in the 2014 movie Every Secret Thing, playing Detective Nancy Porter investigating the disappearance of a young child with similarities to a case she had previously been involved with. The same year, she provided the voice of the Master Builder Wyldstyle in the Warner Bros. animated film The Lego Movie.

In 2014, Banks was recognized by Elle Magazine during The Women in Hollywood Awards, honoring women for their outstanding achievements in film, spanning all aspects of the motion picture industry, including acting, directing, and producing.

=== 2015–2019: Directorial debut ===
After producing and starring in the film Pitch Perfect (2012), Banks directed its sequel, Pitch Perfect 2 (2015), making her feature directorial debut. Its $69 million opening-weekend gross set a record for a first-time director. She also co-produced and starred in both Pitch Perfect 2 and the next sequel, Pitch Perfect 3 (2017). She portrayed Melinda Ledbetter Wilson, the wife of Brian Wilson, in the 2015 biopic Love & Mercy, which is based on the life of the musician and founding member of The Beach Boys, as portrayed by John Cusack. In 2015, Banks was named as a member of the Jury for the Main Competition at the 2015 Venice Film Festival. The festival was chaired by Alfonso Cuarón. Also in 2015, she was a spokeswoman for Realtor.com in a series of television commercials. In mid-February 2016, Banks appeared in advertisements for clothing company Old Navy. She also played space alien Rita Repulsa in the 2017 Power Rangers reboot film.

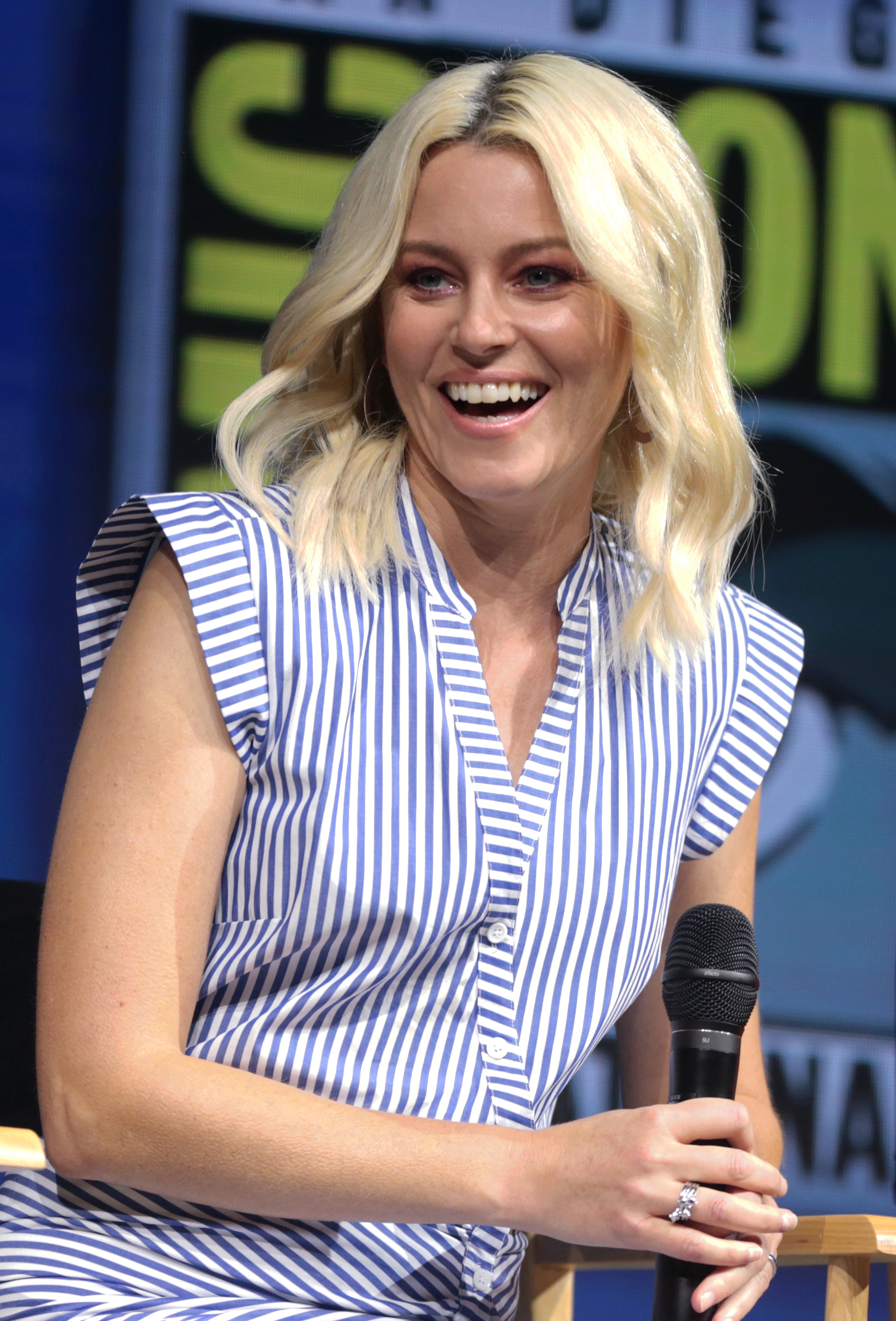
Banks speaking at the 2018 San Diego Comic-Con

In 2018, Banks co-starred as Jenny in the comedy film The Happytime Murders, alongside Melissa McCarthy and Maya Rudolph. In 2019, she reprised her starring role as Lucy / Wyldstyle in the animated comedy film The Lego Movie 2: The Second Part. She starred as Tori Breyer in the superhero horror film Brightburn. Banks was a speaker at the 2018 San Diego Comic-Con, where she promoted The Lego Movie 2: The Second Part. She and co-stars Chris Pratt and Stephanie Beatriz were there and the film's trailer was released.

On May 2, 2019, ABC announced Banks as the host of the summer 2019 revival of the game show Press Your Luck, which she also executive produces. Banks directed, produced, wrote, and starred as Bosley in the action comedy film Charlie's Angels, which was released in November 2019. In November 2019, it was announced that Banks was set to star in, direct, and produce a new adaptation of The Invisible Woman (1940), based on her own original story pitch. Erin Cressida Wilson is writer for the reboot of the female monster, while Max Handelman and Alison Small serve as producer and executive producer, respectively.

Banks began hosting the ABC revival of the game show Press Your Luck in 2019.

=== 2020–present: Television and film work ===
In 2020, she starred as feminist Jill Ruckelshaus in the FX miniseries Mrs. America.

In February 2020, Banks was allowed to pitch a project by Universal Pictures from the roster of Universal Monsters, eventually pitching The Invisible Woman. In June 2020, it was announced that she would star as Ms. Frizzle in a live-action/animated hybrid of The Magic School Bus, which she will also produce through her company Brownstone Productions alongside directors Tom McGrath and Eric Darnell. After six years of being stuck in development hell, the project was revived in 2026 with Rob Letterman serving as writer and director and Banks still attached to play Ms. Frizzle.

In May 2021, Peacock announced that Banks would direct and star in the upcoming television series Red Queen, based on the dystopian novel of the same name.

Banks directed the 2023 comedy horror film Cocaine Bear, which she produced alongside Max Handelman for Brownstone Productions, and Phil Lord and Christopher Miller. The film grossed 90 million dollars on a 30 to 35 million dollar production budget.

In January 2022, Banks was cast in the film The Beanie Bubble, co-directed by Kristin Gore and Damian Kulash. In March 2023 it was announced that Banks would executive produce and voice the character Pebbles Flintstone in the upcoming Fox animated prime time series Bedrock, which would be a reboot of the original series The Flintstones taking place two decades after the series. On July 18, 2024, it was announced that plans for Bedrock were canceled by Fox.

In 2026, Banks starred in the science fiction romantic comedy drama television series The Miniature Wife. That year, she filmed the Apple TV comedy series She's Fine.

== Personal life ==
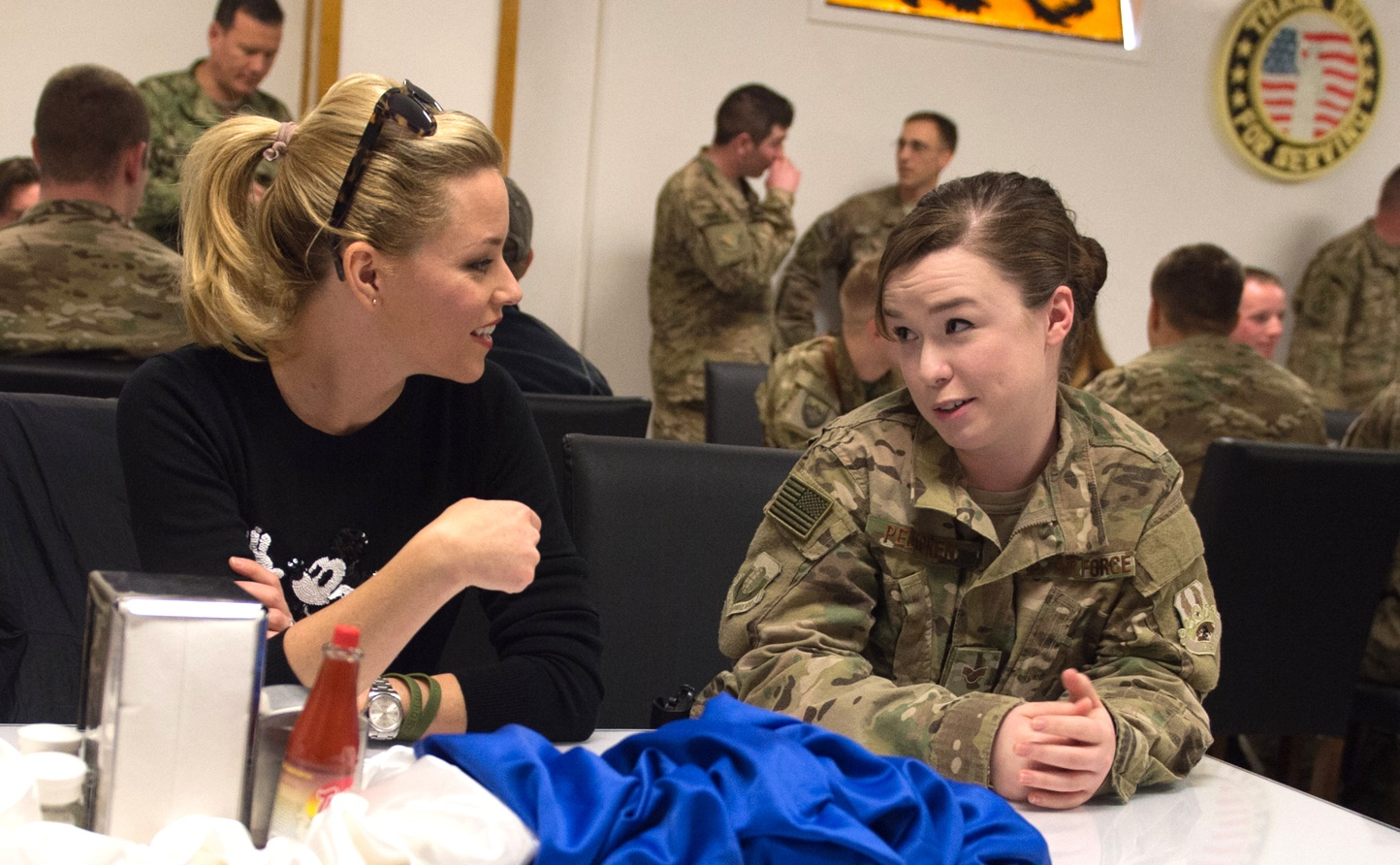
Banks during a USO visit at Bagram Airfield, Afghanistan, December 2015

Banks met her husband, Max Handelman, a sportswriter and producer from Portland, Oregon, on her first day of college on September 7, 1992. He proposed to her after they attended the 2002 Kentucky–LSU football game in Lexington, where Banks had been filming Seabiscuit, and they were married in 2003. They have two sons, both born via surrogacy. Banks said that people have criticized her for using a surrogate mother, even though she was unable to carry her own children due to infertility issues. "I don't feel I owe anybody an explanation...If my story helps people feel less alone on their journey, then I'm grateful for that," Banks said in an interview with Porter's Edit.

Banks went through parts of conversion to Judaism, her husband's faith, and studied with rabbis. In 2013, speaking of her religion, she said that she practices Judaism, although "I did not have my mikveh, so, technically, I'm not converted," but that she has "been essentially a Jew for like 15 years," adding, "Frankly, because I'm already doing everything (practicing religious rituals), I feel like I'm as Jewish as I'm ever going to be."

Banks is one of the original investors in Boston Legacy FC. She had previously been invited to serve in a similar capacity with Angel City FC but declined, explaining, "...I love LA and I live here, but it's not my home." She is also a member of the National Women's Soccer League's (NWSL) 20-person advisory board which was established prior to the 2026 season.

== Political views ==
Banks supports gun control and abortion rights. She was a vocal supporter of Hillary Clinton's 2016 presidential campaign and sang Rachel Platten's single "Fight Song" with other celebrities at the 2016 Democratic National Convention. She says that she is a feminist.

In September 2020, Banks urged her Instagram followers to contact VoteRiders to get information and assistance with voter ID requirements for the presidential election.

== Awards and nominations ==
Year	Work	Association	Category	Result	Ref.
2003	Seabiscuit	Screen Actors Guild Awards	Outstanding Performance by a Cast in a Motion Picture	Nominated	
2003	Herself	Young Hollywood Awards	Exciting New Face	Won	
2006	Invincible	MTV Movie Awards	Best Kiss	Nominated	
2006	Slither	Fangoria Chainsaw Awards	Relationship from Hell	Nominated	
2008	W.	Detroit Film Critics Society	Best Supporting Actress	Nominated	
2009	—N/a	Women in Film Crystal + Lucy Awards	Face of the Future Award	Won	
2009	The Uninvited	Fright Meter Awards	Best Supporting Actress	Nominated	
2011	30 Rock	Primetime Emmy Awards	Outstanding Guest Actress in a Comedy Series	Nominated	
2012	The Hunger Games	MTV Movie Awards	Best On-Screen Transformation	Won	
2012	The Hunger Games	Teen Choice Awards	Choice Movie: Female Scene Stealer	Nominated	
2012	30 Rock	Primetime Emmy Awards	Outstanding Guest Actress in a Comedy Series	Nominated	
2013	Movie 43	Golden Raspberry Awards	Worst Director	Won	
2013	—N/a	CinemaCon	Excellence in Acting	Won	
2013	The Hunger Games: Catching Fire	MTV Movie Awards	Best On-Screen Transformation	Nominated	
2013	The Hunger Games: Catching Fire	San Diego Film Critics Society Awards	Best Supporting Actress	Nominated	
2013	Modern Family	Online Film & Television Association Awards	Best Guest Actress in a Comedy Series	Nominated	
2014	The Lego Movie	BTVA Awards	Best Female Lead Vocal Performance	Nominated	
2014	The Lego Movie	BTVA Awards	Best Vocal Ensemble	Nominated	
2014	The Lego Movie	BTVA People's Choice Awards	Best Female Lead Vocal Performance	Won	
2014	The Lego Movie	BTVA People's Choice Awards	Best Vocal Ensemble	Won	
2014	Love & Mercy	Florida Film Critics Circle Awards	Best Supporting Actress	Nominated	
2014	Love & Mercy	Austin Film Critics Association	Best Supporting Actress	Nominated	
2014	Love & Mercy	Indiana Film Journalists Association	Best Supporting Actress	Nominated	
2014	Love & Mercy	Denver Film Critics Society	Best Supporting Actress	Nominated	
2014	Love & Mercy	Las Vegas Film Critics Society	Best Supporting Actress	Won	
2014	Love & Mercy	San Francisco Film Critics Circle	Best Supporting Actress	Nominated	
2014	Love & Mercy	Georgia Film Critics Association	Best Supporting Actress	Nominated	
2014	Love & Mercy	Santa Barbara International Film Festival	Virtuoso Award	Won	
2014	Love & Mercy	Satellite Awards	Best Supporting Actress – Motion Picture	Nominated	
2015	—N/a	CinemaCon	Breakthrough Filmmaker of the Year	Won	
2015	The Hunger Games: Mockingjay – Part 1	MTV Movie Awards	Best On-Screen Transformation	Won	
2015	Modern Family	Online Film & Television Association Awards	Best Guest Actress in a Comedy Series	Nominated	
2015	Modern Family	Primetime Emmy Awards	Outstanding Guest Actress in a Comedy Series	Nominated	
2015	Pitch Perfect 2	Golden Raspberry Awards	Razzie Redeemer Award	Nominated	
2015	The Lego Movie	BTVA Awards	Best Vocal Ensemble in a Feature Film	Nominated	
2015	The Lego Movie	BTVA Awards	Best Female Lead Vocal Performance in a Feature Film	Won	
2016	Lego Dimensions	BTVA Awards	Best Vocal Ensemble in a Video Game	Won	
2016	Lego Dimensions	BTVA People's Choice Awards	Best Vocal Ensemble in a Video Game	Won	
2017	Power Rangers	Teen Choice Awards	Choice Movie Villain	Nominated	
2020	—N/a	Hasty Pudding Theatricals	Woman of the Year	Won	
2025	Press Your Luck	Primetime Emmy Awards	Outstanding Host for a Game Show	Nominated	
