= Modern Love Tokyo =

Japanese anthology television series

- Genre: Romantic comedy; Anthology
- Created by: Atsuko Hirayanagi
- Based on: Modern Love
- Country of origin: Japan
- Original language: Japanese
- No. of seasons: 1
- No. of episodes: 7

Production
- Executive producer: Atsuko Hirayanagi
- Production locations: Tokyo, Japan
- Production companies: Amazon Studios; Robot Communications

Original release
- Network: Amazon Prime Video
- Release: 21 October 2022

Modern Love Tokyo (モダンラブ・東京, Modanrabu Tōkyō) is a Japanese romantic comedy anthology streaming television series. It is based on the American television series Modern Love, which itself is based on the weekly column of the same name published by The New York Times.

The series began streaming on Amazon Prime Video on 21 October 2022.

== Cast ==
=== Episode 1 ===
- Asami Mizukawa as Mari Takada
- Meiko Kaji as Masako
- Wakana Matsumoto as Kaori
- Atsuko Maeda as Sayaka
- Shinobu Terajima as Touko

=== Episode 2 ===
- Nana Eikura as Kana Sato
- Tasuku Emoto as Keisuke

=== Episode 3 ===
- Ran Itō as Natsuko Kurata
- Ryo Ishibashi as Kosuke Hayami

=== Episode 4 ===
- Ryo Narita as Kengo
- Kaho as Mai

=== Episode 5 ===
- Hiromi Nagasaku as Momoko Shinohara
- Yūsuke Santamaria as Yoji Suzuki

=== Episode 6 ===
- Naomi Scott as Emma
- Sosuke Ikematsu as Mamoru

=== Episode 7 ===
- Haru Kuroki as the voice of Tamami
- Masataka Kubota as the voice of Rin

== Episodes ==
| No. | Title | Directed by | Written by | Original release date |
|---|---|---|---|---|
| 1 | "Nursing My Son, and Some Grievances" | Atsuko Hirayanagi | Atsuko Hirayanagi | 21 October 2022 |
| 2 | "What I've Learned From Sleeping With Married Men" | Ryūichi Hiroki | Hisako Kurosawa | 21 October 2022 |
| 3 | "How My Worst Date Ever Became My Best" | Nobuhiro Yamashita | Yukari Tatsui | 21 October 2022 |
| 4 | "My Hibernating Wife" | Naoko Ogigami | Naoko Ogigami | 21 October 2022 |
| 5 | "For 13 Days, I Believed Him" | Kiyoshi Kurosawa | Kiyoshi Kurosawa | 21 October 2022 |
| 6 | "He Saved His Last Lesson For Me" | Atsuko Hirayanagi | Atsuko Hirayanagi | 21 October 2022 |
| 7 | "He's Playing Our Song" | Naoko Yamada | Naoko Ogigami | 21 October 2022 |

== Production ==
In March 2022, it was announced that Amazon Prime Video had greenlit six Japanese original series, including Modern Love Tokyo. A teaser video for the series was released on 30 March 2022.

It is the third remake of Modern Love to premiere, after Modern Love Mumbai and Modern Love Hyderabad.
