= Grace Edwards (American actress) =

American actress

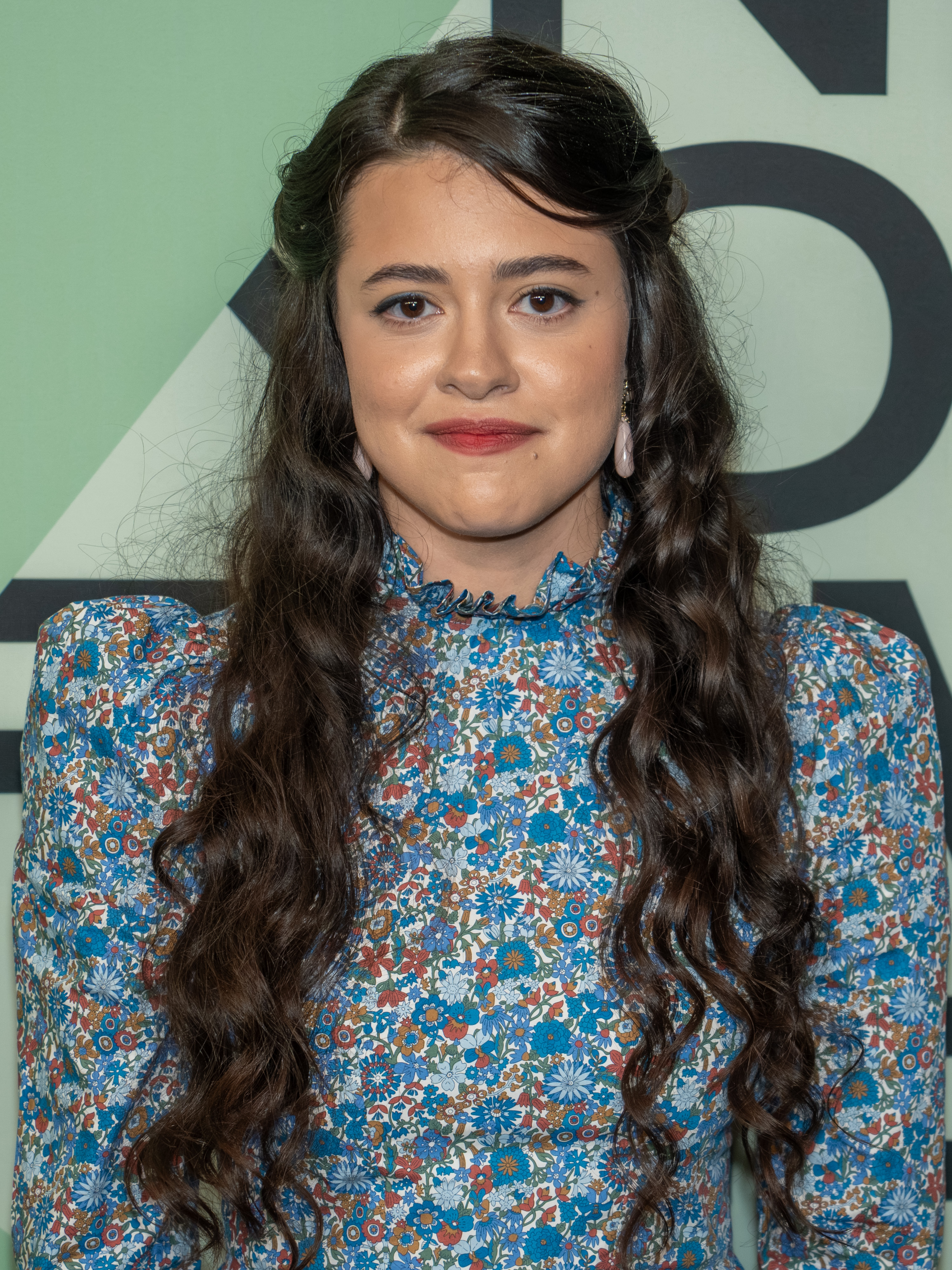
Edwards in 2025

Grace Edwards (born 2003 or 2004) is an American actress.

Born to military parents, Edwards and her family lived throughout Europe, Asia, and the United States before settling in Los Angeles in order for Edwards to explore an acting career. In February 2021, she was cast in an episode of the Amazon Prime Video anthology series Modern Love. She was also cast later that year in the drama film Call Jane. In July 2022, Edwards was announced as part of the cast for Wes Anderson's Asteroid City, in which she portrayed Dinah Campbell, one of the five Stargazers. Her most recent role is in Noah Baumbach's Jay Kelly, released on Netflix on December 5, 2025.

== Filmography ==
Key
†	Denotes productions that have not yet been released

=== Film ===
Year	Title	Role	Notes
2022	Call Jane	Charlotte	
2023	Asteroid City	Dinah	
2025	Jay Kelly	Daisy Kelly	

=== Television ===
Year	Title	Role	Notes
2019	Schooled	Ellen	2 episodes, as Gracy Samuel
2019	Pearson	Tasha	1 episode, as Gracy Samuel
2021	Modern Love	Alexa	1 episode
2021	American Crime Story	Teen	1 episode
