= Harry T. Edwards =

American federal judge (born 1940)

Harry Edwards
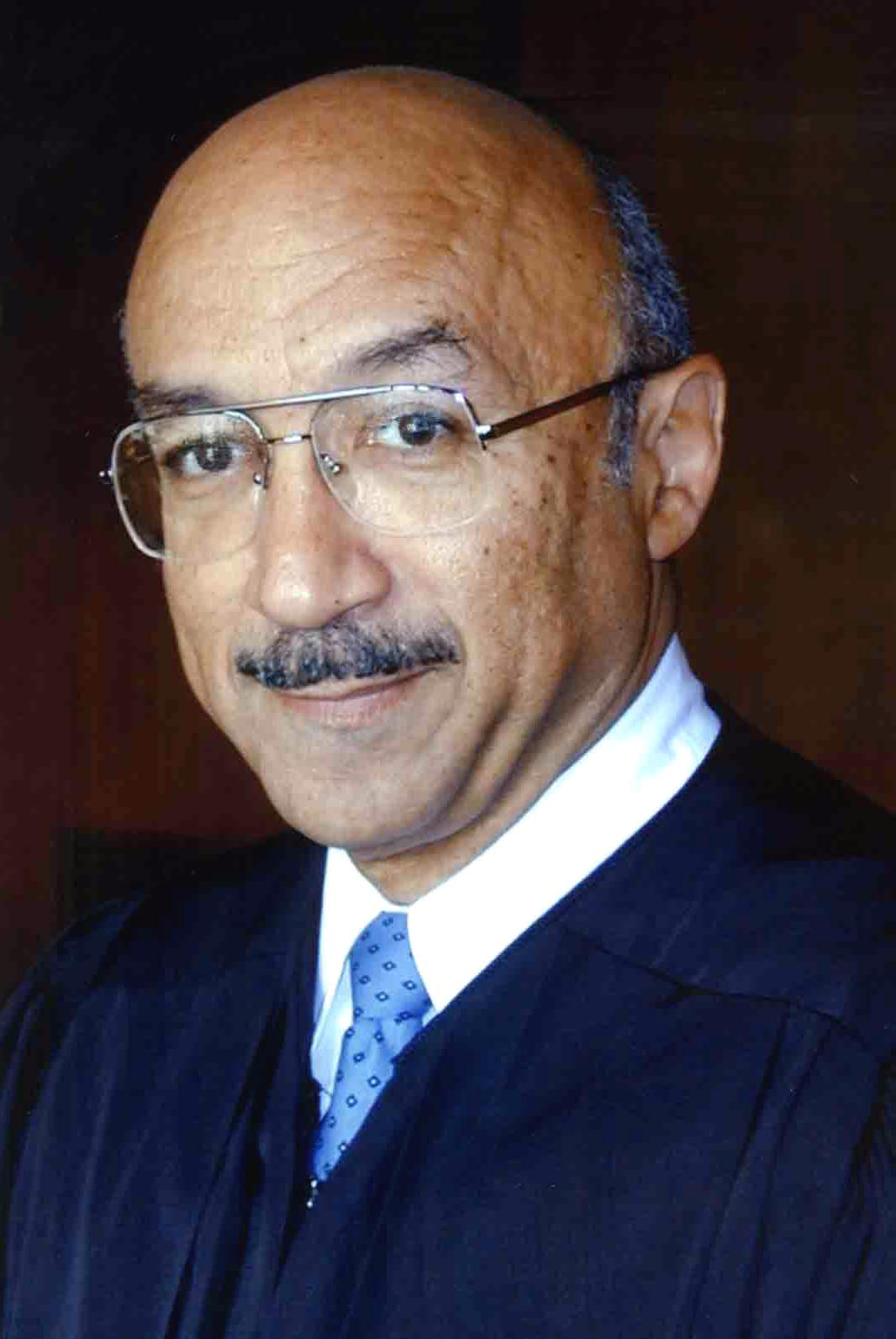
- Official portrait, 2013

Senior Judge of the United States Court of Appeals for the District of Columbia Circuit
- Incumbent
- Assumed office November 3, 2005

Chief Judge of the United States Court of Appeals for the District of Columbia Circuit
- In office September 19, 1994 – July 16, 2001
- Preceded by: Abner Mikva
- Succeeded by: Douglas H. Ginsburg

Judge of the United States Court of Appeals for the District of Columbia Circuit
- In office February 20, 1980 – November 3, 2005
- Appointed by: Jimmy Carter
- Preceded by: David L. Bazelon
- Succeeded by: Seat abolished

Personal details
- Born: Harry Thomas Edwards; November 3, 1940 (age 85) New York City, New York, U.S.
- Spouse: Pamela Carrington (m. 2000)
- Children: 2
- Education: Cornell University (BS); University of Michigan (JD)

Harry Thomas Edwards (born November 3, 1940) is an American lawyer and jurist serving as a senior United States circuit judge of the United States Court of Appeals for the District of Columbia Circuit. He is also a professor of law at the New York University School of Law. Edwards was appointed to the D.C. Circuit in 1980 by President Jimmy Carter and served as its chief judge from 1994 to 2001. He assumed senior status in 2005.

== Early life and education ==
Edwards was born on November 3, 1940, in New York City, the oldest of three children born to Arline Ross Edwards and George H. Edwards. His parents were divorced in 1950 and Edwards and his two sisters, Verne Debourg and Pamela Matthews, were raised by their mother. From 1952 to 1953, his mother attended Smith College, where she earned a Master's degree in social work. While his mother was away, Edwards lived with his grandparents, in the Harlem section of Manhattan. When his mother returned, the family moved to Long Island, where Edwards attended Uniondale High School and was president of the first graduating class.

Edwards received a Bachelor of Science degree from Cornell University in 1962 and a Juris Doctor from the University of Michigan Law School in 1965. He graduated from law school with distinction and was a member of the Michigan Law Review and the Order of the Coif. When he graduated from Michigan, he was the only African American (law student or member of the faculty) in the law school.

During his time in Michigan, Edwards spent time with his father, George H. Edwards, a long-time member of the Michigan House of Representatives; his stepmother, Esther Gordy Edwards, a senior vice president at Motown Record Company; and Berry Gordy, Jr., the founder of Motown Record Company.

== Professional career: 1965–1980 ==
Despite his very strong academic record in law school, Edwards had difficulty finding a job in the legal profession because he was black. Every major law firm to which he applied openly rejected him because of his race. It was only after Professor Russell Smith, his mentor at Michigan, interceded on his behalf that he was hired at Seyfarth, Shaw, Fairweather & Geraldson. He worked with the firm in Chicago from 1965 to 1970, specializing in labor law and collective bargaining.

In 1970, Edwards joined the faculty of the University of Michigan Law School and became the first African American to teach there. His teaching and scholarship focused on labor law, collective bargaining, labor law in the public sector, employment discrimination, arbitration, negotiations, and higher education and the law. In 1974, he and his then-wife Becky, and their children, Brent and Michelle, traveled to Brussels, Belgium, where Edwards was a Visiting Professor of Law at the Free University of Brussels. In 1975, Edwards accepted an invitation to visit at Harvard Law School. He was a Visiting Professor of Law at Harvard Law School during the 1975–76 school year and then accepted a tenured position on the law school faculty in 1976. While at Harvard, Edwards was also a faculty member at the Institute for Educational Management at Harvard University from 1976 through 1982. During this period, he co-authored a book on Higher Education and the Law, which was a major shift in his academic work. In the spring of 1977, Edwards and his family returned to Ann Arbor, Michigan, where he rejoined the faculty of the University of Michigan Law School. In 1980, Edwards was the co-author of four different casebooks (the only legal scholar in the country at the time to achieve the feat).

In 1977, Edwards was nominated by President Carter and confirmed by the Senate to serve on the Board of Directors of Amtrak. He was subsequently elected Chairman by the other members of the Board. He resigned his position with Amtrak when he was appointed to the United States Court of Appeals for the District of Columbia Circuit in 1980. From 1970 until 1980, Edwards served as neutral labor arbitrator on a number of major company and union arbitration panels; he was also Vice President of the National Academy of Arbitrators.

== Federal judicial service ==
When President Carter took office in 1977, among the active federal court of appeals judges, there was only one woman, and only two Black judges. To address this situation, the President established merit selection panels to identify and recommend highly qualified female and minority attorneys for appointment to the federal bench. In 1979, the judicial selection panel for the United States Court of Appeals for the District of Columbia Circuit sent nine names to then-Attorney General Griffin Bell. From that list, President Carter nominated Patricia Wald, Abner Mikva, and Edwards to serve on the court. Ruth Bader Ginsburg was later nominated when an additional opening arose on the D.C. Circuit. Edwards was nominated by the President on December 6, 1979, to a seat vacated by Judge David L. Bazelon, and confirmed by the United States Senate on February 20, 1980, and he received his judicial commission on February 20, 1980. He was 39 years old when he joined the court, reputedly the youngest federal court of appeals judge sitting at the time.

Edwards served as chief judge from the fall of 1994 until July 2001. During his nearly seven years as chief judge of the D.C. Circuit, Edwards directed numerous IT initiatives at the D.C. Circuit; oversaw a complete reorganization of the Clerk's Office and Legal Division; implemented case management programs that helped to cut the court's case backlog and reduce case disposition times; successfully pursued congressional support for the construction of the William B. Bryant Annex to the E. Barrett Prettyman U.S. Courthouse; presided over the court's hearings in United States v. Microsoft; established programs to enhance communications with the lawyers who practice before the court; and received high praise from members of the bench, bar, and press for fostering collegial relations among the members of the court. He assumed senior status on November 3, 2005.

== Law teaching and scholarship since 1980 ==
Since 1980, Edwards has taught at a number of law schools, including Duke, Georgetown, Harvard, Pennsylvania, and Michigan. He is presently a professor of law at the NYU School of Law, where he has taught since 1990. In 2010, he was the C.V. Starr Distinguished Jurist in Residence at the Peking University School of Transnational Law, Shenzhen, China. He is the coauthor of five books. His most recent book is Edwards & Elliott, Federal Standards of Review (3d ed. 2018).

One of his most significant publications, "The Growing Disjunction Between Legal Education and the Legal Profession", 91 Mich. L. Rev. 34 (1992), has been the source of extensive comment, discussion, and debate among legal scholars and practitioners. The article has been recognized as "one of the most-cited law review articles of all time." Three other articles, "Collegial Decision Making in the U.S. Courts of Appeals" (July 2017); Edwards & Livermore, "The Pitfalls of Empirical Studies That Attempt to Understand the Factors Affecting Appellate Decisionmaking", 58 Duke L.J.1895 (2009); and "The Effects of Collegiality on Judicial Decision Making", 151 U. Pa. L. Rev. 1639 (May 2003), explain how appellate judges decide cases and refute the claim that the personal ideologies and political leanings of court of appeals judges are crucial determinants in their decision-making.

In the 2017 paper, Edwards contends that too often commentators attempt to equate the decision-making practices of the U.S. Courts of Appeals with those of the U.S. Supreme Court. This is a mistake, he says, because the organizational structures and judicial responsibilities of the Supreme Court and the Courts of Appeals are strikingly different. And, unlike the Supreme Court, most of the decisions issued by the Courts of Appeals are unanimous. For the terms between 2011 and 2016, the Courts of Appeals issued over 172,000 total decisions on the merits. Only 1.3% of these decisions included a dissent. Less than 1% of the total decisions included a concurring opinion. And 90% of “published” decisions were issued without a dissent. During the same time period: 56% of the decisions issued by the Supreme Court included a dissent; 40% of the signed decisions included a concurring opinion; and only 46% of the Supreme Court’s decisions were unanimous.

In 2004, in commemoration of the fiftieth anniversary of Brown v. Board of Education, Edwards authored "The Journey from Brown v. Board of Education to Grutter v. Bollinger: From Racial Assimilation to Diversity," 102 Mich. L. Rev. 944 (2004), drawing on his own personal and professional experiences to reflect on racial equality and inequality in America over the past 50 years and pondering the consequences of the shift from racial assimilation to diversity as a means of achieving racial equality. In 2017, he amplified some of his thoughts on racial bias in a paper entitled “Reflections on Racial Stigmas and Stereotyping.”

== Work with the National Academy of Sciences ==
In 2006, Edwards was appointed by the United States National Research Council at the National Academy of Sciences to serve as co-chair of the Committee on Identifying the Needs of the Forensic Science Community. On February 18, 2009, the Committee published a widely hailed study reporting serious deficiencies in the nation's forensic science system and calling for major reforms and new research. The report said that rigorous and mandatory certification programs for forensic scientists were lacking, as were strong standards and protocols for analyzing and reporting on evidence. The report also indicated that there was a dearth of peer-reviewed, published studies establishing the scientific bases and reliability of many forensic methods and that many forensic science labs were underfunded, understaffed, and had no effective oversight. Numerous reform efforts have been initiated in the wake of the report.

Edwards also served on the Committee on Science, Technology, and Law at the National Academy of Sciences from 2013 to 2018. In 2016, he served as co-chair of the Senior Advisors to the President’s Council of Advisors on Science and Technology, which published a “Report to the President – Forensic Science in Criminal Courts: Ensuring Scientific Validity of Feature-Comparison Methods” (2016). From 2009 to 2018, Edwards wrote a number of papers and spoke out regularly in favor of reform in the forensic science community. In April 2019, the Judge received the Innocence Network Champion of Justice Award on behalf of the Committee on Identifying the Needs of the Forensic Science Community at the National Academy of Sciences. The award honors those who support efforts to reform the criminal justice system and prevent wrongful convictions.

== Professional activities ==
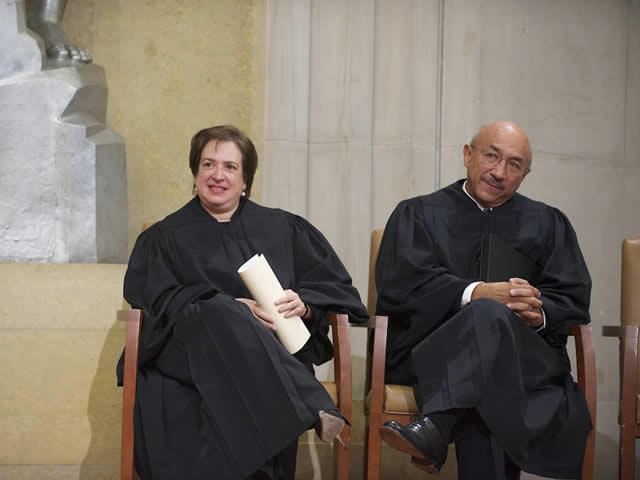
Justice Elena Kagan (left) and Judge Edwards (right) at the Department of Justice in 2011

Edwards is a member of the American Academy of Arts and Sciences; the Board of Directors, Institute for Judicial Administration, NYU School of Law; and a fellow of the American Bar Foundation. In 2004, Edwards received the Robert J. Kutak Award, presented by the American Bar Association Section of Legal Education and Admission to the Bar "to a person who meets the highest standards of professional responsibility and demonstrates substantial achievement toward increased understanding between legal education and the active practice of law." In 2011, Edwards was the recipient of the Inaugural Distinguished Alumni Award from the University of Michigan Law School. He was selected by William & Mary School of Law to receive their 2015 Marshall-Wythe Medallion, the highest honor conferred by the law faculty, recognizing members of the legal community who have demonstrated exceptional accomplishment in law; the Groat Alumni Award from Cornell University; the Society of American Law Teachers Award (for "Distinguished Contributions to Teaching and Public Service"); and he has received a number of honorary degrees.

== Personal life ==
Edwards and his wife, Pamela Carrington-Edwards, were married in 2000. Justice Ruth Bader Ginsburg officiated their wedding ceremony. He has a son, Brent, who is a professor of comparative literature at Columbia University, a daughter, Michelle, and four grandchildren.

== Selected works ==
=== Books ===
- Edwards, Harry T.; Nordin, Virginia Davis (1979). Higher Education and the Law. Cambridge, MA: Institute for Education Management, Harvard University. ISBN 9780934222006.
- Harry T. Edwards & Linda A. Elliott, Federal Standards of Review (3d ed. 2018).

=== Articles ===
- Edwards, Harry T. (1971). "A New Role for the Black Law Graduate—A Reality or an Illusion?". Michigan Law Review. 69 (8): 1407–42. JSTOR 1287443.
- — (1973). "The Emerging Duty to Bargain in the Public Sector". Michigan Law Review. 71 (5): 885–934. JSTOR 1287574.
- — (1983). "The Rising Work Load and Perceived 'Bureaucracy' of the Federal Courts: A Causation-Based Approach to the Search for Appropriate Remedies". Iowa Law Review. 68 (5): 871–936.
- — (1985). "Public Misconceptions Concerning the Politics of Judging: Dispelling Some Myths About the D.C. Circuit". University of Colorado Law Review. 56 (4): 619–46.
- — (1985). "Deferral to Arbitration and Waiver of the Duty to Bargain: A Possible Way Out of Everlasting Confusion at the NLRB". Ohio State Law Journal. 46 (1): 668–84. hdl:1811/64250.
- — (1986). "Alternative Dispute Resolution: Panacea or Anathema?". Harvard Law Review. 99 (3): 668–84. JSTOR 1341152.
- — (1988). "Judicial Review of Labor Arbitration Awards: The Clash Between the Public Policy Exception and the Duty to Bargain". Chicago-Kent Law Review. 64 (1): 3–34.
- — (1991). "The Judicial Function and the Elusive Goal of Principled Decisionmaking". Wisconsin Law Review. 1991: 837–65.
- — (1992). "The Growing Disjunction Between Legal Education and the Legal Profession". Michigan Law Review. 91 (1): 34–78. JSTOR 1289788.
- — (1993). "The Growing Disjunction Between Legal Education and the Legal Profession: A Postscript". Michigan Law Review. 91 (8): 2191–2219. JSTOR 1289731.
- — (1995). "To Err Is Human, But Not Always Harmless: When Should Legal Error Be Tolerated?" (PDF). New York University Law Review. 70 (6): 1167–1228.
- — (1998). "Collegiality and Decision Making on the D.C. Circuit". Virginia Law Review. 84 (7): 1335–70. JSTOR 1073674.
- — (2002). "Reflections (On Law Review, Legal Education, Law Practice, and My Alma Mater)". Michigan Law Review. 100 (8): 1999–2007. JSTOR 1290431.
- — (2003). "The Effects of Collegiality on Judicial Decision Making". University of Pennsylvania Law Review. 151 (5): 1639–90. JSTOR 3313001.
- — (2004). "The Journey from Brown v. Board of Education to Grutter v. Bollinger: From Racial Assimilation to Diversity". Michigan Law Review. 102 (5): 944–78. JSTOR 4141986.
- —; Livermore, Michael A. (2009). "Pitfalls of Empirical Studies That Attempt to Understand the Factors Affecting Appellate Decisionmaking". Duke Law Journal. 58 (8): 1895–1989.
- — (2014). "Another Look at Professor Rodell's Goodbye to Law Reviews". Virginia Law Review. 100 (7): 1483–1511. JSTOR 24362699.

== See also ==
- List of African-American federal judges
- List of African-American jurists
- List of United States federal judges by longevity of service

Legal offices
Preceded by David L. Bazelon	Judge of the United States Court of Appeals for the District of Columbia Circuit; 1980–2005	Seat abolished
Preceded by Abner Mikva	Chief Judge of the United States Court of Appeals for the District of Columbia Circuit; 1994–2001	Succeeded by Douglas H. Ginsburg
