= David L. Bazelon =

American judge (1909–1993)

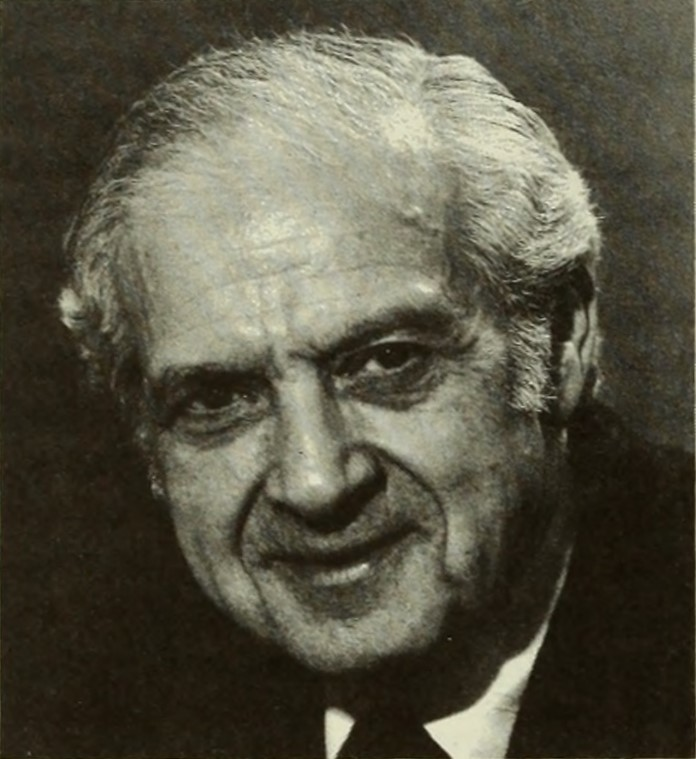

Senior Judge of the United States Court of Appeals for the District of Columbia Circuit
- In office June 30, 1979 – February 19, 1993

Chief Judge of the United States Court of Appeals for the District of Columbia Circuit
- In office October 9, 1962 – March 27, 1978
- Preceded by: Wilbur Kingsbury Miller
- Succeeded by: J. Skelly Wright

Judge of the United States Court of Appeals for the District of Columbia Circuit
- In office October 21, 1949 – June 30, 1979
- Appointed by: Harry S. Truman
- Preceded by: Seat established by 63 Stat. 493
- Succeeded by: Harry T. Edwards

12th United States Assistant Attorney General for the Environmental and Natural Resources Division
- In office 1946–1947
- President: Harry S. Truman
- Preceded by: Norman Littell
- Succeeded by: A. Devitt Vanech

Personal details
- Born: David Lionel Bazelon; September 3, 1909 Superior, Wisconsin, U.S.
- Died: February 19, 1993 (aged 83) Washington, D.C., U.S.
- Relations: Emily Bazelon (granddaughter); Lara Bazelon (granddaughter)
- Education: Northwestern University (BSL)

David Lionel Bazelon (September 3, 1909 – February 19, 1993) was a United States circuit judge of the United States Court of Appeals for the District of Columbia Circuit.

== Education and career ==
Bazelon was born in Superior, Wisconsin, the son of Lena (Krasnovsky) and Israel Bazelon, a general store proprietor. His parents were Ukrainian Jewish immigrants. His father died in 1912 and his mother remarried to Nathan Harris.

Bazelon grew up in Chicago, Illinois, and earned a Bachelor of Science in Law from Northwestern University in 1931. He read law to enter the bar in 1932. He entered private practice in Chicago from 1932 to 1935. He was an Assistant United States Attorney for the Northern District of Illinois from 1935 to 1946. He then worked as the United States Assistant Attorney General for the Public Lands Division of the United States Department of Justice from 1946 until June 1, 1947, when he moved to Alien Property, where he remained until he became a judge.

== Federal judicial service ==
In 1948, then-Attorney General Tom C. Clark lobbied for Bazelon — Clark's deputy — to be appointed to the 7th Circuit Court of Appeals in Chicago, but his nomination was not supported by Illinois' two US Senators, Democrats Lucas and Douglas. In Illinois, there was a widespread perception, including by Lucas and Douglas, that Bazelon was not qualified for the post. J. Edgar Hoover, who was a friend and patron Bazelon in the 1940's despite significant political disagreements, urged Bazelon to take his post in the Justice Department and supported his bid for a judicial post.

After Clark was confirmed as a US Supreme Court Justice, in breach of judicial norms, he continued to lobby for Bazelon's appointment although switching his efforts to getting Bazelon a seat on the DC Circuit Court of Appeals. Senators Lucas and Douglas supported Bazelon's appointment to that court despite the fact that Bazelon had contributed funds to the unsuccessful 1948 campaign of incumbent Republican US Senator Charles W. Brooks, whom Douglas defeated. Harold L. Ickes, a key figure in the Roosevelt administration, indicated that Bazelon's activities as head of the Office of Alien Property Custodian warranted a Senate investigation but predicted none would be forthcoming.

Bazelon received a recess appointment from President Harry S. Truman on October 21, 1949, to the United States Court of Appeals for the District of Columbia Circuit, to a new seat authorized by 63 Stat. 493. At 40 years of age, he was the youngest person ever appointed to that court. He was nominated to the same position by President Truman on January 5, 1950. He was confirmed by the United States Senate on February 8, 1950, and received his commission on February 10, 1950.

Bazelon served as Chief Judge from October 9, 1962 to March 27, 1978. He was a member of the Judicial Conference of the United States from 1963 to 1977. He assumed senior status on June 30, 1979. He was the last appeals court judge remaining in active service appointed by President Truman. (Note: Three judges appointed by Truman to district courts — Edward Allen Tamm of the District of Columbia, James Skelly Wright of the Eastern District of Louisiana, and Irving Kaufman of the Southern District of New York — would remain in active service on appeals courts by appointments of subsequent presidents for at least six years after Bazelon took senior status. Kaufman remained in active service as late as 1987.) He assumed inactive senior status in 1985 due to the onset of Alzheimer's disease. His service terminated on February 19, 1993, due to his death from that condition.

Bazelon was elected a Fellow of the American Academy of Arts and Sciences in 1970.

=== Influencing the United States Supreme Court ===
Bazelon was for decades the senior judge on the United States Court of Appeals for the District of Columbia Circuit, and a close associate of Justice William J. Brennan Jr., whom he had met in 1956. Justice William O. Douglas and President Lyndon B. Johnson would be their sometime companions on trips to baseball games.

Bazelon served with Warren E. Burger on the D.C. Circuit for over a decade, and the two grew to be not just professional rivals, but personal enemies as well.

The Washington Post observed in 1981 that during the Warren Court era, lawyers who wanted a Bazelon opinion upheld would do well to mention the judge's name as many times as possible in their briefs... "One mention of this name was worth 100 pages of legal research."

Bazelon became a primary source of Justice Brennan's law clerks.

=== Judicial career ===
Bazelon had a broad view of the reach of the Constitution. He expanded the scope of the "insanity" defense in the landmark case of Durham v. United States (1954) and led the D.C. Circuit Court of Appeals toward an expansive view of criminals' rights. Bazelon authored many far-reaching decisions on topics as diverse as the environment, the eighteen-year-old vote, discrimination, and the insanity defense. Many of his "radical" rulings were upheld by the Supreme Court.

In Rouse v. Cameron, 373 F.2d 451 (D.C. Cir. 1966), Bazelon, writing for the court, became the first appellate judge to say that civilly committed mental patients had a "right to treatment."

=== Feud with Burger ===
Bazelon was the nemesis of Chief Justice Warren E. Burger beginning from the time both served on the Court of Appeals. Bazelon was a nationally recognized advocate for the rights of the mentally ill, and his opinion in 1954's Durham v. United States (which adopted a new criminal insanity test) set off a long clash between the two judges, because Burger strongly opposed the new test. Under Bazelon's Durham rule, a defendant would be excused from criminal responsibility if a jury found that the unlawful act was "the product of mental disease or mental defect," rather than the product of an "irresistible impulse" (which was the old test). Burger found the Durham rule deeply objectionable, and this was one of many serious disagreements the two would have over the course of their careers. Bazelon's reach extended to Burger's tenure on the Supreme Court, owing to Bazelon's close friendship with Justice William J. Brennan Jr.

=== Watergate ===
On September 4, 1973, Chief Judge David L. Bazelon of the U.S. Court of Appeals for the District of Columbia circuit ordered a speeded-up schedule for appeals of John Sirica's order that Nixon surrender White House tapes for judicial inspection. The move was aimed at getting the case to the Supreme Court as soon as possible after the Court convened Oct. 1, in the hope that the high court would rule on the tapes dispute in time for the Watergate grand jury to complete its work before its mandate expired Dec. 5.

With appeals yet to be filed, Bazelon advised White House attorneys and the special prosecutor that the Appeals Court would receive briefs Sept. 10 and hear oral arguments the next day. Both sides would have until Sept. 14 to file any further papers, and a decision most likely would come the following week, Bazelon said.

== Legacy ==
Bazelon's former law clerks include prominent figures such as Loftus Becker, Alan Dershowitz, Martha Minow, Thomas Merrill, John Sexton, Robert Post, David O. Stewart, Eleanor Swift, Barbara Underwood, Joel Klein, and John Koskinen. The Bazelon Center for Mental Health Law, an organization devoted to legal advocacy on behalf of persons with mental disabilities, is named after him. Bazelon also became a very high-profile critic of the American Correctional Association, resigning from its accreditation committee. He was very disturbed by what he discovered to be an unaccountable organization that failed in its task of ensuring the professional and humane operations of prisons it evaluated.

== Personal life ==
Bazelon was married to child welfare advocate Miriam (Kellner) Bazelon for 57 years, until his death; they had two sons, James Bazelon and Richard Bazelon. Bazelon's granddaughters are journalist Emily Bazelon, University of San Francisco law professor Lara Bazelon, co-founder of Bridges to Wealth Jill Bazelon, and Assistant District Attorney in Philadelphia Dana Bazelon.

== See also ==
- List of Jewish American jurists
- List of United States federal judges by longevity of service

== Notes ==
Legal offices
Preceded by Seat established by 63 Stat. 493	Judge of the United States Court of Appeals for the District of Columbia Circuit; 1949–1979	Succeeded by Harry T. Edwards
Preceded by Wilbur Kingsbury Miller	Chief Judge of the United States Court of Appeals for the District of Columbia Circuit; 1962–1978	Succeeded by J. Skelly Wright
