= Call Jane =

- Theatrical release poster
- Directed by: Phyllis Nagy
- Screenplay by: Hayley Schore; Roshan Sethi
- Produced by: Robbie Brenner; David Wulf; Kevin McKeon
- Starring: Elizabeth Banks; Sigourney Weaver; Chris Messina; Kate Mara; Wunmi Mosaku; Cory Michael Smith; Grace Edwards; John Magaro
- Cinematography: Greta Zozula
- Edited by: Peter McNulty
- Music by: Isabella Summers
- Production companies: Ingenious Media; RB Entertainment; Redline Entertainment; Our Turn Productions; FirstGen Content; LB Entertainment
- Distributed by: Roadside Attractions
- Release dates: January 21, 2022 (Sundance); October 28, 2022 (United States)
- Running time: 121 minutes
- Country: United States
- Language: English
- Box office: $694,787

Call Jane is a 2022 American drama film starring Elizabeth Banks as a suburban housewife in the 1960s who deals with a life-threatening pregnancy and subsequently joins the Jane Collective, an underground network of abortion activists. The film also stars Sigourney Weaver, Chris Messina, Kate Mara, Wunmi Mosaku, Cory Michael Smith, Grace Edwards, and John Magaro. It is directed by Phyllis Nagy. The screenplay was written by Hayley Schore and Roshan Sethi.

It premiered at the 2022 Sundance Film Festival on January 21, 2022. It was released in the United States on October 28, 2022, by Roadside Attractions.

== Plot ==
In 1968 Chicago, Joy Griffin, a traditional housewife, is pregnant with a second child long after having a daughter, Charlotte, who is now a teenager and just experienced menstruation. Shortly after witnessing the 1968 Democratic National Convention protests, Joy begins experiencing bouts of fatigue, culminating in her passing out at her home. In the hospital, she and her husband Will learn that her pregnancy is causing her to have congestive heart failure, which will kill her unless she has her child before then, or has an abortion.

Joy and Will decide to petition the hospital’s all-male board for an abortion, only for them to unanimously refuse her request. In the wake of this, Joy becomes increasingly desperate over time. She eventually attempts a back alley abortion, but backs out upon seeing the horrible conditions. Running outside, Joy finds an ad for the Jane Collective, a Chicago underground women's network that provides safer abortions. Joy schedules an appointment with them, and is escorted by a former patient named Gwen to a secret clinic outside of town. There, Joy successfully receives an abortion from a talented but misogynistic male gynecologist, Dean. While recuperating, she meets the collective's founder, Virginia. Upon returning home, Joy lies to Will and Charlotte about the circumstances and claims she had a miscarriage.

A few days later, Virginia calls Joy at her home and exhorts her to escort a woman to the clinic after Gwen is struck with food poisoning, which she reluctantly does. Joy is mortified to discover the girl is a flippant teenager named Sandra, and the father is having an extramarital affair with her and also paying for the procedure. Virginia rebukes this, saying that no woman deserves to be judged, but rather helped. Joy eventually gets roped into becoming part of the collective, under the guise of going to art class, and befriends Virginia.

Joy begins assisting Dean with the procedure, as well as patients going through emotional stress. This results in her discovering that Dean is not actually a licensed medical professional, and has no degree. Meanwhile, friction grows over the high $600 charge that Dean requests for each abortion, particularly Gwen, as her fellow African Americans are disproportionately disadvantaged to pay the fee. While Virginia struggles to negotiate a new deal, Joy bribes Dean, agreeing to keep her mouth shut if Dean teaches her how to perform abortions, which he reluctantly does. Joy eventually lets slip Dean's situation while trying to convince Virginia of her capabilities; Virginia still refuses, as Dean is still more qualified, the money helps pay for the clinic, and a botched abortion is treated as a homicide.

Virginia's new deal with Dean allows for two free procedures, and she gives one of them for Joy to do, only for Joy to discover that it is Sandra. The procedure is a success, but Charlotte follows her to the clinic and discovers the truth. Despite this, Virginia agrees to trust Joy, and has her replace Dean. Things go smoothly for a while, but eventually, one of the procedures is botched, causing the patient to bleed after the fact. A series of events tips Joy off to a police detective, who arrives at the house. Joy is forced to admit the practice to him and Will when he declares he will send a fake patient there, but tricks him into thinking the fee is active. Will is initially furious, but reconciles with her afterwards.

Joy attempts to quit to keep a low profile, causing Virginia to come to her house and plead for her return. Discovering that hundreds of women are now on the waiting list, Charlotte encourages Joy to return. She eventually compromises by agreeing to stay for a while until she can show the rest of the women the procedure, and the collective agrees. Tens of thousands of women subsequently receive the procedure, and Will successfully defends the collective in court once they are exposed, ultimately leading to the legalization of abortion nationwide. The collective is subsequently disbanded, and a party is held in celebration.

== Cast ==
- Elizabeth Banks as Joy Griffin
- Sigourney Weaver as Virginia
- Chris Messina as Will Griffin
- Kate Mara as Lana
- Wunmi Mosaku as Gwen
- Cory Michael Smith as Dean
- Grace Edwards as Charlotte
- John Magaro as Detective Chilmark
- Aida Turturro as Sister Mike
- Bianca D'Ambrosio as Erin
- Bruce MacVittie as Director Richardson
- Rebecca Henderson as Edie
- Maia Scalia as Marion
- Sean King as Officer White
- Alison Jaye as Sandra
- Kristina Harrison as Clare

== Production ==
The script originally appeared on the 2017 Black List, where it received seven votes. Coincidentally, another script based on the same story, titled This is Jane by Daniel Loflin, was also featured on the same Black List, with nine votes.

It was announced in October 2020 that Elizabeth Banks, Sigourney Weaver, Kate Mara and Rupert Friend had been cast to star in the film. Elisabeth Moss and Susan Sarandon had been initially cast as Joy and Virginia respectively, but both had to exit due to scheduling conflicts. In May 2021, Chris Messina, Cory Michael Smith, Aida Turturro, Wunmi Mosaku, Grace Edwards, and Bianca D'Ambrosio joined the cast of the film, with Friend no longer attached.

The film was shot in West Hartford, Connecticut from May and June 2021, during the COVID-19 pandemic.

== Release ==
It premiered at the 2022 Sundance Film Festival on January 21, 2022. On February 4, 2022, Roadside Attractions acquired the film's distribution rights, with plans to release it theatrically in the fall. It was released on October 28, 2022.

The film was released for VOD on December 6, 2022, followed by a Blu-ray and DVD release on December 13, 2022.

The film’s European premiere was as an official Competition selection at the 72nd Berlin International Film Festival on February 13, 2022 and nominated for the Golden Bear. It subsequently played at a number of important international film festivals, including the BFI London Film Festival (October 14, 2022).

The film partnered with Planned Parenthood and the Abortion Care Network to screen at dozens of American clinics. In a statement by Nagy, the director hoped that screenings would serve as an opportunity to increase awareness around direct abortion care services in the months following the overturning of Roe v. Wade.

== Reception ==
On the review aggregator website Rotten Tomatoes, 82% of 130 critics' reviews are positive, with an average rating of 6.7/10. The website's consensus reads: "Although its focus is somewhat narrow, Call Jane is an entertaining and dramatically effective dramatization of a pivotal chapter in American history." Metacritic, which uses a weighted average, assigned the film a score of 62 out of 100, based on 35 critics, indicating "generally favorable" reviews.

On its opening weekend, Call Jane grossed $243,922.
