= Modern Love (podcast) =

Podcast about love

Modern Love is a podcast based on The New York Times column of the same name.

== Background ==
The show debuted on January 21, 2016. That year, the show reached number one on the Apple Podcasts charts, passing the debut of Serial's second season. The show was originally hosted by Meghna Chakrabarati and edited by Daniel Jones. In 2019, the show began production under The New York Times exclusively and the new co-hosts were Daniel Jones and Miya Lee, and then in 2022 Anna Martin became the new host.

The initial idea for the show came from Lisa Tobin in particular, and the show was then created by Jessica Alpert and Daniel Jones. The idea was developed by the WBUR iLab team and then pitched to The New York Times. When the show was pitched The New York Times did not have an in-house audio production team.

Episodes are released every Thursday. Modern Love has also been adapted into a book and a television series. In 2017, the show went on tour and selected listener-submitted stories for their Valentine's Day episode. The show released its 100th episode in February 2018.
