= Surrender Dorothy (film) =

- Directed by: Kevin DiNovis
- Written by: Kevin DiNovis
- Produced by: Richard Goldberg
- Starring: Peter Pryor; Kevin DiNovis; Jason Centeno; Elizabeth Casey; Marcos Muniz
- Cinematography: Jonathan Kovel
- Edited by: Kevin DiNovis
- Music by: Christopher Matarazzo
- Distributed by: TLA Releasing
- Release date: January 21, 1998 (Slamdance)
- Running time: 87 minutes
- Country: United States

Surrender Dorothy is an independent film by director Kevin DiNovis which won first place at the 1998 Slamdance Film Festival. The film stars Peter Pryor and Kevin DiNovis (who performed when the designated actor left the production a week before filming). The film is shot in black and white. It is also notable for featuring the first film role for Elizabeth Banks, who appears in the credits as "Elizabeth Casey."

The film was shot in Philadelphia, Pennsylvania.

== Plot ==
After the heroin-addicted Lanh robs his roommate Denis, Lanh attempts to hide out at the home of Trevor, Denis's best friend. Trevor is afraid of women. He uses Lanh's drug addiction to manipulate him, eventually transforming Lanh into Trevor's idea of a perfect girlfriend.

== Cast ==
- Peter Pryor as Trevor
- Kevin DiNovis as Lanh
- Jason Centeno as Denis
- Elizabeth Banks as Vicki
- Marcos Muniz as Angel
- Keri Merboth as Nadia

== Reception ==
Critical reception for the film has been mixed. The Stranger criticized it, saying that although it "makes the most of its tiny budget" it was ultimately "inarticulate and immature". Sam Adams of the Philadelphia City Paper admitted that the film was "not without its flaws" but was ultimately "a bold, ballsy and attention-getting debut". Total Film panned it, giving the DVD release two stars and calling it a "yawn fest". James Berardinelli gave it three and a half stars, praising DiNovis's performance. In The A.V. Club, Noel Murray called it "memorable, but...also grubby, harsh, and lacking in wit". Leonard Klady wrote in Variety that it was "disturbing, hard-edged tale of physical abuse and sexual aberration that pulls no punches" but that it was ultimately "decidedly for niche tastes". Roger Ebert selected it for his first Overlooked Film Festival in 1999 in Champaign, Illinois.
