= Modern Love (TV series) =

American anthology television series

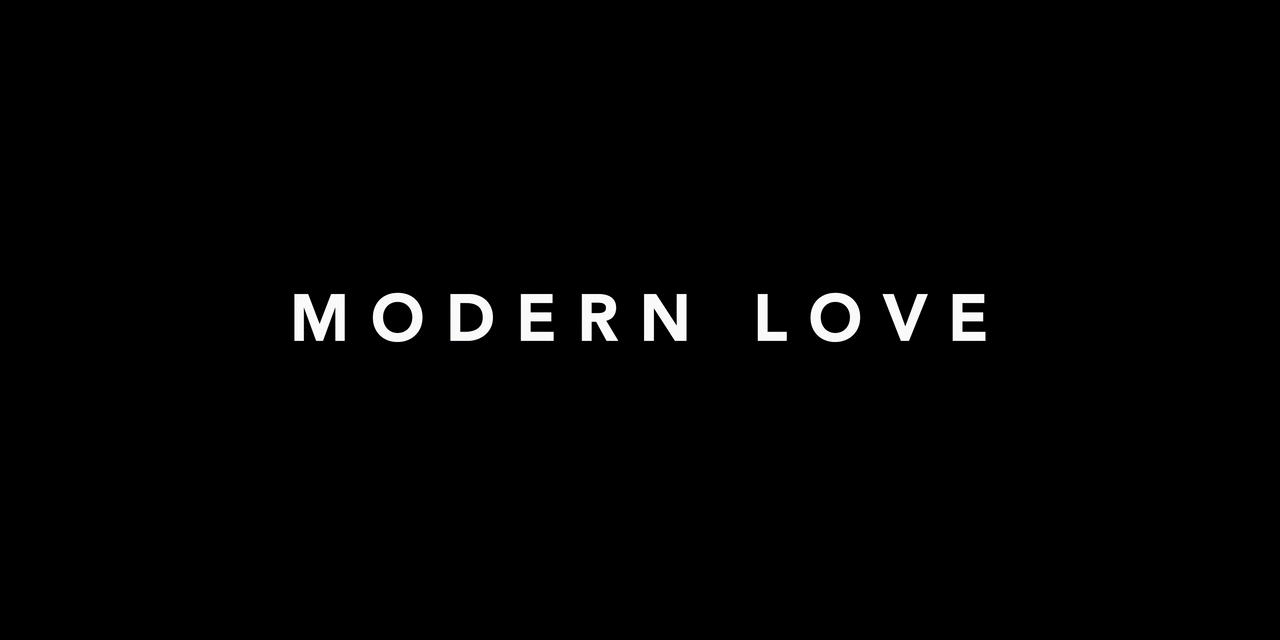
- Genre: Romantic comedy; Anthology
- Based on: "Modern Love" by The New York Times
- Developed by: John Carney
- Opening theme: "Setting Sail" by Gary Clark and John Carney
- Country of origin: United States
- Original language: English
- No. of seasons: 2
- No. of episodes: 16

Production
- Executive producers: John Carney; Todd Hoffman; Sam Dolnick; Choire Sicha
- Producer: Trish Hofmann
- Running time: 29–35 minutes
- Production companies: Storied Media Group; Picrow; Likely Story; Amazon Studios

Original release
- Network: Amazon Prime Video
- Release: October 18, 2019 – August 13, 2021

Related
- Modern Love Mumbai; Modern Love Hyderabad; Modern Love Tokyo; Modern Love Amsterdam; Modern Love Chennai

Modern Love is an American romantic comedy anthology television series developed by John Carney, based on the weekly column of the same name published by The New York Times, that premiered on Amazon Prime Video on October 18, 2019. In October 2019, the series was renewed for a second season, which was released on August 13, 2021.

== Premise ==
Modern Love explores love in its multitude of forms—including sexual, romantic, familial, platonic, and self-love—across two seasons of eight half-hour episodes. The Amazon series, based on the New York Times column of the same name, adapts different love stories taking place in New York City. In the second season, a few episodes take place in other locations.

== Cast and characters ==
=== Season 1 ===
==== Episode 1 ====
- Cristin Milioti as Maggie Mitchell
- Laurentiu Possa as Guzmin
- Brandon Victor Dixon as Daniel
- Daniel Reece as Mark
- Charles Warburton as Ted

==== Episode 2 ====
- Catherine Keener as Julie
- Dev Patel as Joshua
- Caitlin McGee as Emma
- Erik Jensen as Darren
- Andy García as Michael

==== Episode 3 ====
- Anne Hathaway as Lexi Donohoe
- Gary Carr as Jeff
- Quincy Tyler Bernstine as Sylvia
- Judd Hirsch as cop/vendor/taxi driver

==== Episode 4 ====
- Tina Fey as Sarah
- John Slattery as Dennis
- Sarita Choudhury as therapist
- Aidan Fiske as Jack
- Arden Wolfe as Nancy

==== Episode 5 ====
- Sofia Boutella as Yasmine
- John Gallagher Jr. as Rob

==== Episode 6 ====
- Julia Garner as Madeline "Maddy"
- Shea Whigham as Peter
- Myha'la Herrold as Tami

==== Episode 7 ====
- Andrew Scott as Tobin
- Brandon Kyle Goodman as Andy
- Olivia Cooke as Karla
- Ed Sheeran as Mick

==== Episode 8 ====
- Jane Alexander as Margot
- James Saito as Kenji
- Peter Hermann as Philippe
- Petronia Paley as Janice
- James Waterston as Chris

=== Season 2 ===
==== Episode 1 ====
- Minnie Driver as Stephanie Curran
- Tom Burke as Michael
- Don Wycherley as Neil

==== Episode 2 ====
- Gbenga Akinnagbe as Jordan
- Zoë Chao as Zoe
- Ryan Spahn as Billy
- Aparna Nancherla as Vanessa

==== Episode 3 ====
- Lucy Boynton as Paula
- Kit Harington as Michael
- Jack Reynor as Declan
- Miranda Richardson as Jane

==== Episode 4 ====
- Dominique Fishback as Lil
- Isaac Powell as Vince
- Milan Ray as Lil (age 12)
- Pierson Salvador as Vince (age 12)

==== Episode 5 ====
- Lulu Wilson as Katie
- Maria Dizzia as Lori
- Grace Edwards as Alexa
- Telci Huynh as Moush
- Linda Powell as Mrs. Vacher

==== Episode 6 ====
- Garrett Hedlund as Spence
- Anna Paquin as Isabelle
- Ben Rappaport as Nick
- Jeena Yi as Jeannie
- Susan Blackwell as Allison

==== Episode 7 ====
- Zane Pais as Robbie
- Marquis Rodriguez as Ben
- Nikki M. James as Pam

==== Episode 8 ====
- Sophie Okonedo as Elizabeth Cannon
- Tobias Menzies as Van
- Eileen Walsh as Lily De Courcy

== Episodes ==
Season	Episodes	Originally released
1	8	October 18, 2019
2	8	August 13, 2021

=== Season 1 (2019) ===
No. overall	No. in season	Title	Directed by	Written by	Essay by	Original release date	Prod. code
1	1	"When the Doorman Is Your Main Man"	John Carney	John Carney	Julie Margaret Hogben	October 18, 2019	MOLV 102
This episode follows Maggie (Cristin Milioti) as she navigates the dating scene in New York City. Advising her through this process is her building's doorman, Guzmin (Laurentiu Possa), who voices his concern when he disapproves of the men Maggie brings home to the apartment. Maggie then discovers she is pregnant, but she is no longer with the father. Guzmin supports and assists her during the preparation for the birth of her baby, Sarah (Arabella Olivia Clark). Maggie eventually moves to Los Angeles for a job opportunity. A few years later, she visits Guzmin in New York with her daughter and her new boyfriend (Brandon Victor Dixon) to reconnect with Guzmin and to see if he approves of her boyfriend.
2	2	"When Cupid Is a Prying Journalist"	John Carney	John Carney	Deborah Copaken	October 18, 2019	MOLV 101
Julie (Catherine Keener) interviews Joshua (Dev Patel), the young, successful founder of a new dating app. Julie concludes her interview with Joshua by asking if he has ever been in love. He confesses that the one time he had been truly in love, he realized it too late. The episode then flashes back to his relationship with the one that got away, Emma (Caitlin McGee). He ended his relationship with Emma after she confesses to sleeping with her ex-boyfriend. Julie then recounts a failed reconnection with her first love and encourages Joshua to go after Emma. The episode ends in a happily-ever-after for Joshua and Emma, all thanks to the prying journalist Julie.
3	3	"Take Me as I Am, Whoever I Am"	John Carney	John Carney	Terri Cheney	October 18, 2019	MOLV 103
While Lexi (Anne Hathaway) is filling out an online dating application, she reflects on how her bipolar disorder has affected her love life in the past. She recalls her failed relationship with Jeff (Gary Carr), whom she met in a grocery store, and remembers him through a series of fast conversations, song and dance, and depressive episodes. Lexi reveals it was her failure to tell Jeff about her bipolar disorder that made her realize she should be open about her mental illness and give people the opportunity to know her in both moments of highs and lows. She ultimately decides to disclose on her dating profile that she is bipolar.
4	4	"Rallying to Keep the Game Alive"	Sharon Horgan	Sharon Horgan	Ann Leary	October 18, 2019	MOLV 106
This episode tells the story of Sarah (Tina Fey) and Dennis (John Slattery), a married couple with two children. It opens with the couple in counseling, deciding their marriage is over. Scenes from the previous six months show Sarah and Dennis working on their marriage in various ways for the sake of their children, including playing tennis (by Dennis' own rules). Back in the present, the two leave counselling and get a meal together. Sarah finally explains her issues with Dennis' childish and selfish behavior, and he eventually apologizes. Viewers then see their relationship's improvements two years later (and their tennis matches that now follow the rules).
5	5	"At the Hospital, an Interlude of Clarity"	Tom Hall	Tom Hall	Brian Gittis	October 18, 2019	MOLV 104
Yasmine (Sofia Boutella) and Rob (John Gallagher Jr.) find themselves in the hospital before the end of their second date when Rob accidentally cuts his arm open on a martini glass. Throughout their time at the hospital, the two ask each other a series of rapid-fire questions to get to know each other better. As the night goes on, the topics of the questions become more personal and intense, forcing them to become more vulnerable with each other and reveal deep truths. By the next morning when Rob is discharged from the hospital, the couple find themselves with a certain bond despite meeting not long ago.
6	6	"So He Looked Like Dad. It Was Just Dinner, Right?"	Emmy Rossum	Audrey Wells	Abby Sher	October 18, 2019	MOLV 105
Maddy (Julia Garner) begins to take an interest in an AI engineer at her work, Peter (Shea Whigham), who embodies everything she remembers about her late father and everything she would want him to be. She attempts to catch his attention at work. Soon after, he asks her to dinner at his house where they discuss the absence of her father. They begin to see each other more frequently—he performs chores around her apartment, takes her to doctor appointments, and they spend weekends at the zoo together. When Peter tries to kiss Maddy after purchasing her a $395 coat, she becomes upset as she saw him as the father she never had, not a romantic partner. In the end, Peter informs her that he is taking a sabbatical, that he is proud of her, and that she is the daughter of any father's dreams. Finally, after Peter's encouragement, Maddy feels grown-up now.
7	7	"Hers Was a World of One"	John Carney	John Carney	Dan Savage	October 18, 2019	MOLV 107
The lavish couple Tobin (Andrew Scott) and Andy (Brandon Kyle Goodman) are matched with an expecting mother, Karla (Olivia Cooke), by an open adoption agency. The couple feels troubled, as Karla is both nomadic and homeless, but agree nonetheless. After the first two trimesters of Karla's pregnancy, she moves back to New York into Tobin and Andy's place. Tobin quickly grows fed up with Karla's living habits and blows up at her, but they quickly make up that same night after a vulnerable discussion about their lifestyles. Later that night, Karla goes into labor, and they are rushed to the hospital, where Tobin stays by her side the entire time. The bond they created allowed them all to learn from each other's vastly different lives.
8	8	"The Race Grows Sweeter Near Its Final Lap"	Tom Hall	John Carney & Tom Hall	Eve Pell	October 18, 2019	MOLV 108
This episode alternates between the past, a love story between Margot (Jane Alexander) and Kenji (James Saito), and the present, during Kenji's funeral. Margot and Kenji are an older couple who connect over their love of running. The two decided to take their love slowly because of Kenji's difficulty in recovering from the death of his wife, who had died six years prior. Their relationship began to progress quickly after Kenji suggested they sleep together after a marathon they ran together. After the funeral, Margot decides to go for another run and passes by young couples in love, including characters from previous episodes. Margot compares herself to these young couples, considering her own age and experience with relationships. The episode also includes cameos by the key figures in all the previous episodes and provides details not previously known about their stories.

=== Season 2 (2021) ===
No. overall	No. in season	Title	Directed by	Written by	Original release date	Prod. code
9	1	"On a Serpentine Road, With the Top Down"	John Carney	John Carney	August 13, 2021	TBA
Stephanie (Minnie Driver) resists selling her 30-year-old Triumph Stag. It is later revealed that while in the car, she feels like she can still speak to her deceased first husband and father of her eldest child and is reluctant to lose that connection. Her second husband sympathizes with her and buys the car back.
10	2	"The Night Girl Finds a Day Boy"	Jesse Peretz	Sarah Heyward	August 13, 2021	TBA
Zoe (Zoë Chao), a woman with delayed sleep phase disorder, meets and falls in love with Jordan (Gbenga Akinnagbe). While Jordan is at first willing to stay up late for their relationship, he eventually starts resenting how it inconveniences him. When Zoe fails to wake up on time for a lunch meeting with his mother, the two go on a break, but Jordan later offers to move in with her, expressing how much he has missed her. They agree to work on their lifestyle differences and give their relationship a second chance.
11	3	"Strangers on a (Dublin) Train"	John Carney	John Carney	August 13, 2021	TBA
Medievalism student Paula (Lucy Boynton) meets Michael (Kit Harington) on a train to Dublin during the beginning of the COVID-19 quarantine. Instead of exchanging contact information, they promise to see each other when the lockdown lifts, not knowing that the quarantine will be longer than expected. Two weeks later, both try to make it to the train station but are stopped by authorities. However, Michael remembers the street where Paula lives and goes to wait for her there.
12	4	"A Life Plan for Two, Followed by One"	Marta Cunningham	Sarra-Jane Piat-Kelly and Dime Davis and Marta Cunningham	August 13, 2021	TBA
A comedian, Lil (Dominique Fishback), recalls her relationship with her best friend from school, Vince (Isaac Cole Powell). Vince helped Lil integrate into their Brooklyn middle school after the latter transferred in from Ohio. Lil develops feelings for him, but does not act on them, and their strong friendship lasts into high school and university. In college, Lil loses her virginity to Vince, but afterwards he tells her he regrets it and does not want to change their friendship. Devastated, Lil storms out and the two do not talk for years. Back in the present, Vince is in the audience of Lil's stand-up comedy show. Afterwards, the two reconcile.
13	5	"Am I...? Maybe This Quiz Game Will Tell Me"	Celine Held & Logan George	Celine Held & Logan George	August 13, 2021	TBA
Middle school-aged girl Katie (Lulu Wilson) develops feelings for her schoolmate, Alexa (Grace Edwards), with whom she bonds over their shared love for anime. Katie attempts to figure out her sexuality by taking online quizzes that offer no clarity. While at a schoolwide sleepover, the two girls kiss, but get into trouble for sneaking out; embarrassed, Katie asks her single mother Lori (Maria Dizzia) to bring her home. The next morning, Katie goes to Alexa's house and the two girls affirm that they want to give their relationship a shot.
14	6	"In the Waiting Room of Estranged Spouses"	John Crowley	Susan Soon He Stanton	August 13, 2021	TBA
An ex-Marine, Spence (Garrett Hedlund), discovers that his wife Jeannie (Jeena Yi) is having an affair with Nick (Ben Rappaport). Following a car accident, Spence starts seeing a therapist and develops a bond with Nick's ex-wife Isabelle (Anna Paquin), whom he serendipitously meets in the waiting room. Spence eventually asks Isabelle on a date. The night of their date, Nick and Isabelle's son Charlie becomes sick; Spence runs into Nick at the store and advises him to bring Charlie to the hospital. Charlie is diagnosed with meningitis. Spence leaves the hospital after seeing Isabelle and Nick bond over their son, assuming they are reconciling, and finalizes his divorce with Jeannie. At Charlie's next birthday, however, Isabelle asks Spence out again. The two reveal their new relationship to their shared therapist.
15	7	"How Do You Remember Me?"	Andrew Rannells	Andrew Rannells	August 13, 2021	TBA
Ben (Marquis Rodriguez) and Robbie (Zane Pais) spot each other on a New York street. It is revealed through flashbacks that the two went on one date years earlier. Although the men's recollections vary slightly, both retelling involve the two having a good date and sex at Ben's place before Ben receives the news that his father is in a coma. Ben rebuffs Robbie's attempts to help and the two lose contact. Back on the street, Ben and Robbie share a meaningful glance at a crosswalk before carrying on with their lives.
16	8	"Second Embrace, With Hearts and Eyes Open"	John Carney	Kieran Carney	August 13, 2021	TBA
Elizabeth (Sophie Okonedo) and Van (Tobias Menzies) start seeing each other again years after their divorce. Just as Van attempts to propose, however, Elizabeth shares her advanced breast cancer diagnosis with him and rejects his proposal. Van takes care of their daughters in the lead-up to Elizabeth's surgery, which goes well; afterwards, Elizabeth admits that she would have agreed to his proposal were it not for the cancer. The two resolve to work through her treatment together.

== Production ==
=== Development ===
On June 11, 2018, it was announced that Amazon had given the production a series order for a first season consisting of eight episodes. The series was set to be directed, written, and produced by John Carney. Production companies involved with the series were slated to include Storied Media Group and The New York Times. On November 26, 2018, it was reported that Emmy Rossum, Sharon Horgan, and Tom Hall would serve as additional directors for the series. Horgan and Hall also wrote the episodes they were set to direct while Rossum was expected to direct an episode written by Audrey Wells. Additionally, it was further reported that Dimitri Hoffman, Sam Dolnick, and Choire Sicha would serve as executive producers, Trish Hofmann as a producer, and Daniel Jones as a consulting producer. On October 24, 2019, Amazon renewed the series for a second season which premiered on August 13, 2021.

=== Casting ===
On November 26, 2018, it was announced that Anne Hathaway, Tina Fey, Dev Patel, John Slattery, Brandon Victor Dixon, Catherine Keener, Julia Garner, Andy García, Cristin Milioti, Olivia Cooke, Andrew Scott, Shea Whigham, Gary Carr, Sofia Boutella, and John Gallagher Jr. had been cast in the first season.

In April 2020, it was revealed that Jesse Eisenberg has been cast in the second season.

In February 2021, the second-season cast was announced, including Gbenga Akinnagbe, Lucy Boynton, Minnie Driver, Kit Harington, Garrett Hedlund, Anna Paquin, Jack Reynor and Miranda Richardson. In May 2021, Sophie Okonedo and Tobias Menzies joined the cast of second season.

=== Filming ===
Principal photography for the series had begun by September 18, 2018, in New York City. The second season was filmed in the New York cities of Schenectady, Albany, and Troy, as well as in Enniskerry and Stoneybatter, Dublin, Ireland.

== International versions ==
In April 2022, Prime Video announced the Indian versions of the series in three different languages:

- Modern Love Mumbai in Hindi
- Modern Love Hyderabad in Telugu
- Modern Love Chennai in Tamil

A Japanese version of the series, titled Modern Love Tokyo, premiered worldwide on October 21, 2022.

A Dutch version of the series, titled Modern Love Amsterdam, premiered worldwide on December 16, 2022.

== Reception ==
Critical response of Modern Love
Season	Rotten Tomatoes	Metacritic
1	75% (64 reviews)	66 (26 reviews)
2	58% (12 reviews)	61 (8 reviews)

On Rotten Tomatoes it received an overall score of 66%, and an overall score of 65 on Metacritic.

=== Season 1 ===
The first season held a 75% approval rating on Rotten Tomatoes based on 64 reviews, with an average rating of 6.6/10. The site's critical consensus read: "Carried by its charming cast, Modern Love sweet and simple sensibilities are easy enough to enjoy, even if its quaint portrait of modern life in New York City doesn't always ring true." On Metacritic, the first season received an average rating of 66 out of 100, based on 26 critics, indicating "generally favorable reviews".

=== Season 2 ===
The second season held a 58% approval rating on Rotten Tomatoes based on 12 reviews, with an average rating of 5.7/10. The site's critical consensus read: "Modern Love struggles in its second season, favoring romantic clichés over the more complicated truths that make its source material so appealing - still, there's no denying the allure of its talented cast, which might be enough for some viewers." On Metacritic, the second season received an average rating of 61 out of 100, based on 8 critics, indicating "generally favorable reviews".

=== Accolades ===
Year	Award	Category	Nominee(s)	Result	Ref.
2020	Critics' Choice Television Awards	Best Actress in a Movie/Miniseries	Anne Hathaway	Nominated	
2020	Critics' Choice Television Awards	Best Supporting Actor in a Movie/Miniseries	Dev Patel	Nominated	
2020	Primetime Emmy Awards	Outstanding Guest Actor in a Comedy Series	Dev Patel (for "When Cupid Is a Prying Journalist")	Nominated	
