= Modern Love (column) =

Column published in The New York Times

"Modern Love" is a column published in The New York Times that was started in 2004 by Daniel Jones. It appears in the Style section on Sundays. It has spawned a podcast, books and a TV series by the same name.
