= Pitch Perfect (franchise) =

American musical comedy media franchise

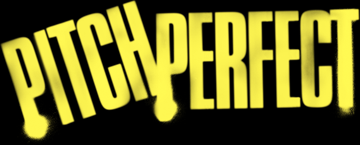
- Pitch Perfect logo
- Created by: Kay Cannon
- Original work: Pitch Perfect (2012)
- Owner: NBCUniversal
- Years: 2012–present
- Based on: Pitch Perfect: The Quest for Collegiate a Cappella Glory by Mickey Rapkin

Films and television
- Film(s): Pitch Perfect (2012); Pitch Perfect 2 (2015); Pitch Perfect 3 (2017)
- Television series: Pitch Perfect: Bumper in Berlin (2022)

Audio
- Soundtrack(s): Pitch Perfect; Pitch Perfect 2; Pitch Perfect 3; Pitch Perfect: Bumper in Berlin

Pitch Perfect is an American musical comedy media franchise created by Kay Cannon, based on the non-fiction book Pitch Perfect: The Quest for Collegiate a Cappella Glory by Mickey Rapkin. Jason Moore directed the first film, Elizabeth Banks directed the second, and Trish Sie directed the third. Paul Brooks, Max Handelman, and Banks produced the films. The film series features an ensemble cast, including Anna Kendrick, Rebel Wilson, Anna Camp, Brittany Snow, Skylar Astin, Adam DeVine, Ben Platt, Alexis Knapp, Hana Mae Lee, Ester Dean, Hailee Steinfeld, Chrissie Fit, John Michael Higgins, and Banks; while the television series stars DeVine. The series is distributed by Universal Pictures.

The franchise is about a female a cappella group, called The Barden Bellas, that takes part in the International Championship of Collegiate A Cappella (ICCA) in order to become the best collegiate a cappella group in the world and sing in front of the president of the United States.

The first film was a sleeper hit. It received positive reviews and was financially successful, grossing $115 million against a $17 million budget. A sequel was made and released in 2015, to greater financial success, grossing $287 million against a $29 million budget. The series has since gained a cult following, grossing $565 million worldwide, and the second film is the highest grossing musical comedy film of all time, beating School of Rock's record.

== Films ==
=== Pitch Perfect (2012) ===
Beca Mitchell (Anna Kendrick), a rebellious and unwilling freshman at Barden University, joins a disgraced all-female a cappella group, The Barden Bellas, directed by uptight senior student Aubrey Posen (Anna Camp). The film follows the unlikely new formation of The Barden Bellas which has to struggle to win at the collegiate a cappella competition.

=== Pitch Perfect 2 (2015) ===
Set three years after the first film, The Bellas are the leading a cappella group with Beca as the leader until Fat Amy (Rebel Wilson) accidentally rips her pants during a performance, effectively suspending the group. They could be reinstated if they win an international a cappella competition, where no American team has ever won. With new members, tough competition, and doubts everywhere from almost everyone, they try to regain their glory, only to find it harder than it looks with their focus being split up and losing their harmony along the way.

=== Pitch Perfect 3 (2017) ===
Two years after the second film, the now graduated Bellas find themselves split apart and struggling with their real life jobs. However, after a brief reunion, Aubrey comes up with an idea to perform for the USO tour, which will reunite them for a series of shows. The Bellas go overseas for the USO where they find out that they are actually competing with other bands on tour to be the opening act for DJ Khaled.

== Television series ==
=== Pitch Perfect: Bumper in Berlin (2022) ===
In September 2021, it was announced that a television series based on the film series had been ordered at Peacock for a 2022 release, with Adam DeVine reprising his role as Bumper Allen. It will be written by Megan Amram, who will also serve as executive producer and showrunner and Elizabeth Banks serve as executive producer. In March 2022, Sarah Hyland, Jameela Jamil, and Lera Abova were announced to be joining the cast alongside Flula Borg, who is reprising his role as Piëter Krämer from the second film.

=== Pitch Perfect: K-Pop Idols (TBA) ===
On June 27, 2025, Elizabeth Banks and Max Handelman of Brownstone Productions announced that they are set to produce a spin-off series titled Pitch Perfect: K-Pop Idols. Joel Kim Booster is set to write the series and Jason Moore will be the executive producer and director of the series.

== Development of the first film ==
=== Development and production ===
The film is based on Mickey Rapkin's non-fiction book Pitch Perfect: The Quest for Collegiate a Cappella Glory. Rapkin, senior editor at GQ magazine, spent a season covering competitive collegiate a cappella. He followed the Tufts University Beelzebubs, the University of Oregon Divisi (the loose inspiration for the Bellas), and the University of Virginia Hullabahoos, who have a cameo in the film. Rapkin's book mainly covers the singing, groupies, partying and rivalries. Two members of the a cappella community, Deke Sharon, who founded the International Championship of College A Cappella, and Ed Boyer, both in Rapkin's book, were brought on board to arrange songs, produce vocals and act as on-site music directors, where they ran a month-long "a cappella boot camp". The film was shot throughout campus and inside buildings at Louisiana State University in Baton Rouge, Louisiana. Elizabeth Banks is a co-producer and a co-star in the film.

=== Casting ===
The casting department included Justin Coulter, Rich Delia, Allison Estrin, and Michael Roth. One of the producers, Paul Brooks, stated "First and foremost, we were looking for actors who had comedic instincts and thought we'd get lucky with terrific actors who happened to be funny and can actually dance and maybe sing. It turns out we did get lucky with our cast!" According to producer Elizabeth Banks, "The character Beca required someone who was grounded, who has a strong point of view on the world, who is funny and empathetic and someone who we can all relate to and root for." Of Kendrick she said, "Anna is all those things, and there was no other choice." Fellow producer Brooks said "I saw Anna in Up in the Air and thought it was the most exquisite, elegant, balanced, sublime performance. Anna was our first choice for the role of Beca."

When casting the character of Jesse, Max Handelman said "We were looking for a young John Cusack-type guy. We needed to find someone who was kind of awkward but not a geek, but not so cool that you're not rooting for him." Skylar Astin was chosen for the role. Of Astin's audition, Banks said the chemistry between Skylar and Anna when they read together prior to shooting was "clear and they were able to riff off each other."

Rebel Wilson was recognized for her performance in the comedy film Bridesmaids upon auditioning for the role of Fat Amy, which she won instantly. Moore recalled Wilson singing Lady Gaga's "The Edge of Glory" while beating "on her chest with her fists." He said, "I didn't even hear the end of the song because I was laughing so hard. There's this beautiful openness to the way Rebel approaches everything, and that's what works great for the character. She's fearless." Adam DeVine was personally chosen by Banks and Handelman for the role of Bumper after they saw him on the television series Workaholics. Banks said that she and her husband are "big Workaholics fans," and after watching one night during the film's casting, they saw DeVine and "immediately thought" he would be a good choice for Bumper. He initially declined because he was not a singer. DeVine eventually surprised Banks and Handelman with his vocal skills. Anna Camp was chosen for the role of Aubrey. Producer Max Handelman said, "Elizabeth and I were huge fans of Anna's from True Blood. Aubrey is set up as the antagonist for Beca, and Beca's already a bit hard-edged, so it was so important to find an actress who could play Aubrey as someone who could marshal the crazy but also was sympathetic." Kelley Jakle was brought in as a "ringer" due to her past experience as a two-time ICCA champion with the SoCal VoCals and had also appeared on two seasons of The Sing-Off.

== Cast and crew ==
=== Cast ===
List indicators

This section includes characters who will appear or have appeared in more than two films in the series.

- An empty grey cell indicates the character was not in the film, or that the character's official presence has not yet been confirmed.
- ^{A} indicates an appearance through archival footage or audio.
- ^{C} indicates a cameo role.
- ^{E} indicates an appearance not included in the theatrical cut.
- ^{O} indicates an older version of the character.
- ^{P} indicates an appearance in onscreen photographs.
- ^{U} indicates an uncredited appearance.
- ^{V} indicates a voice-only role.
- ^{Y} indicates a younger version of the character.

Character	Films			Television series
Character	Pitch Perfect	Pitch Perfect 2	Pitch Perfect 3	Pitch Perfect: Bumper in Berlin
Character	2012	2015	2017	2022
Beca Mitchell	Anna Kendrick	Anna Kendrick	Anna Kendrick	
Aubrey Posen	Anna Camp	Anna Camp	Anna Camp	
Chloe Beale	Brittany Snow	Brittany Snow	Brittany Snow	
Patricia "Fat Amy" Hobart	Rebel Wilson	Rebel Wilson	Rebel Wilson	
Lilly Onakurama / Esther	Hana Mae Lee	Hana Mae Lee	Hana Mae Lee	
Stacie Conrad	Alexis Knapp	Alexis Knapp	Alexis Knapp^{C}	
Cynthia-Rose Adams	Ester Dean	Ester Dean	Ester Dean	
Jessica Smith	Kelley Jakle	Kelley Jakle	Kelley Jakle	
Ashley Jones	Shelley Regner	Shelley Regner	Shelley Regner	
Denise	Wanetah Walmsley			
Emily Junk		Hailee Steinfeld	Hailee Steinfeld	
Florencia Fuentes		Chrissie Fit	Chrissie Fit	
Alice	Kether Donohue	Kether Donohue		
Jesse Swanson	Skylar Astin	Skylar Astin		
Benji Applebaum	Ben Platt	Ben Platt		
Bumper Allen	Adam DeVine	Adam DeVine		Adam DeVine
Donald	Utkarsh Ambudkar			
Luke	Freddie Stroma			
John Smith	John Michael Higgins	John Michael Higgins	John Michael Higgins	
Gail Abernathy-McKadden-Feinberger	Elizabeth Banks	Elizabeth Banks	Elizabeth Banks	
Tonehanger Jason	Jason Jones	Jason Jones		Jason Jones
Dr. Benjamin Mitchell	John Benjamin Hickey			
Tommy	Christopher Mintz-Plasse			
Katherine Junk		Katey Sagal		
Kommissar		Birgitte Hjort Sørensen		
Pieter Krämer		Flula Borg		Flula Borg
Fergus Hobart			John Lithgow	
Calamity			Ruby Rose	
Charity			Andy Allo	
Theo			Guy Burnet	
Chicago Walp			Matt Lanter	
Heidi Miller				Sarah Hyland
Gisela				Jameela Jamil
Thea Krämer aka DJ Das Boot				Lera Abova

Note: A light grey cell indicates a character who did not appear in that film or the television series.

=== Crew ===
Crew/Detail	Films		
Crew/Detail	Pitch Perfect (2012)	Pitch Perfect 2 (2015)	Pitch Perfect 3 (2017)
Director(s)	Jason Moore	Elizabeth Banks	Trish Sie
Producer(s)	Paul Brooks, Max Handelman and Elizabeth Banks	Paul Brooks, Max Handelman and Elizabeth Banks	Paul Brooks, Max Handelman and Elizabeth Banks
Screenwriter(s)	Kay Cannon	Kay Cannon	Kay Cannon and Mike White
Composer(s)	Christophe Beck and Mark Kilian	Mark Mothersbaugh	Christopher Lennertz
Cinematographer(s)	Julio Macat	Jim Denault	Matthew Clark
Editor(s)	Lisa Zeno Churgin	Craig Alpert	Craig Alpert and Colin Patton
Production company(s)	Gold Circle Films; Brownstone Productions	Gold Circle Films; Brownstone Productions	Gold Circle Films; Brownstone Productions; Perfect World Pictures
Distributor	Universal Pictures	Universal Pictures	Universal Pictures
Release date	September 28, 2012	May 15, 2015	December 22, 2017
Runtime	112 minutes	115 minutes	93 minutes

== Reception ==
=== Critical response ===
Film	Critical		Public
Film	Rotten Tomatoes	Metacritic	CinemaScore
Pitch Perfect	81% (156 reviews)	66 (33 reviews)	A
Pitch Perfect 2	66% (216 reviews)	63 (39 reviews)	A−
Pitch Perfect 3	28% (151 reviews)	40 (33 reviews)	A−

=== Box office performance ===
Film	Release date	Box office gross				Box office ranking		Budget
Film	Release date	United States opening weekend	North America	Other territories	Worldwide	All time North America	All time worldwide	Budget
Pitch Perfect	October 5, 2012	$14,846,830	$65,001,093	$50,349,333	$115,350,426	#1,197	#1,634	$17 million
Pitch Perfect 2	May 15, 2015	$69,216,890	$184,296,230	$102,847,849	$287,144,079	#197	#454	$29 million
Pitch Perfect 3	December 22, 2017	$19,928,525	$104,897,530	$80,502,815	$185,400,345	#624	#1,027	$45 million
Total			$354,194,853	$233,699,997	$587,894,850	—		$91 million
