= Pitch Perfect: Bumper in Berlin (soundtrack) =

Pitch Perfect: Bumper in Berlin (Music from the Peacock Original Series)

Soundtrack album by Various artists
- Released: November 23, 2022
- Genres: A capella; pop
- Length: 21:01
- Label: Universal Music

Singles from Pitch Perfect: Original Motion Picture Soundtrack
- 1. "Know My Name" Released: November 16, 2022

Pitch Perfect: Bumper in Berlin (Music from the Peacock Original Series) is the soundtrack to the Peacock comedy television series Pitch Perfect: Bumper in Berlin, a spin-off of the Pitch Perfect film series. The album was released by Universal Music Enterprises on November 23, 2022, the same day as its series premiere, and was led by the single "Know My Name" released prior to the album. It was released in Dolby Atmos on Apple Music.

== Promotion and release ==
The track "99 Luftballoons x Take On Me" was performed by Adam DeVine, Sarah Hyland and Flula Borg at the annual Macy's Thanksgiving Day Parade in New York City on November 24, 2022 (Thanksgiving). It was live telecasted on NBC and Peacock the same day.

The official Spotify playlist for Pitch Perfect: Bumper in Berlin consisted songs from the original soundtrack, as well as songs from the Pitch Perfect film soundtracks, notably "Cups" and "Flashlight".

== Track listing ==
No.	Title	Music	Performer(s)	Length
1.	"Kings & Queens"	Ava Max	Adam DeVine; The Tonehangers	1:34
2.	"It Wasn't Me"	Shaggy	DeVine; Sarah Hyland	1:22
3.	"Know My Name (Bumper Version)"	Ryan Tedder	DeVine	2:52
4.	"It Must Have Been Love"	Roxette	DeVine; Hyland; Flula Borg; Lera Abova; Katharina Thalbach	1:08
5.	"99 Luftballons x Take On Me (Bumper Version)"	Nena; a-ha	DeVine; Ed Boyer	0:36
6.	"Sing When I Want To"	Harvey Mason Jr.; Andrew Hey; Sam Ramirez	Jameela Jamil	1:44
7.	"Sweet Child o' Mine"	Guns N' Roses	DeVine; Borg	1:09
8.	"Riff Off Medley" (Rock You Like a Hurricane/Milkshake/Du hast/My Prerogative/Major Tom/As Long As You Love Me)	Scorpions; Kelis; Rammstein; Bobby Brown; Peter Schilling; Justin Bieber	Devine; Jamil; Borg	1:21
9.	"Where You Are"	Mason Jr.; Hey; Ramirez	DeVine	1:01
10.	"Barbie Girl"	Aqua	DeVine; Hyland; Borg; Abova	1:25
11.	"Know My Name (Piano Version)"	Tedder	DeVine; Hyland	1:01
12.	"Valerie"	The Zutons	DeVine	0:57
13.	"99 Luftballons x Take On Me (Gisela Version)"	Nena; a-ha	Jamil	1:02
14.	"Message in a Bottle"	Taylor Swift	DeVine	1:04
15.	"Know My Name x Where You Are (Mashup)"	Tedder; Mason Jr.; Hey; Ramirez	DeVine; Hyland; Borg	1:32
16.	"99 Luftballons x Take On Me (Thanksgiving Day Parade Version)"	Nena; a-ha	DeVine; Hyland; Borg	1:13
Total length:				21:01

== Reception ==
The musical numbers in the series received some praise. Alex Maidy of JoBlo.com wrote "The series is at its best when it is delivering musical performances which Devine gives his all to. There are some solid mash-ups and original songs." Writing for /Film, Barry Levitt said, "The music is what makes 'Pitch Perfect' so memorable, and the songs in 'Bumper in Berlin' are pretty good, even if they pale in comparison. The opening 'Kings & Queens' is probably the most impressive number, but renditions of 'Barbie Girl' and 'Valerie' are pretty fun too. There's also a riff-off, which is the film's crowning glory, and while it's fun, it's so haphazard that it makes you long for the movies. Thankfully everyone here can sing, and the individual performances regularly impress. A big part of the plot comes around an original song, which is completely unremarkable. Everyone in the show is acting like it's Shakespearean in quality, but frankly its quite forgettable, and pales in comparison to 'Flashlight' the original song from 'Pitch Perfect 2'." Shannon O'Connor of The Daily Beast criticised the music, saying "Pitch Perfect is nothing without good music. Even when the movie's story wasn't great then at least there were inspired a capella moments. Sadly, with Bumper in Berlin, the song choices are as uninspired as the story." Elite Daily's Ani Bundel said that the soundtrack to the series captures the "old magic of the first film".
