= Brownstone Productions =

American film and television production company

Brownstone Productions, Inc.
- Type: Private
- Industry: Film; Television
- Founded: October 16, 2002; 23 years ago in Santa Clarita, California, U.S.
- Founders: Elizabeth Banks; Max Handelman
- Headquarters: Universal Studios Lot, Universal City, California, United States
- Key people: Elizabeth Banks (CEO & CFO); Max Handelman
- Services: Film production; Television production

Brownstone Productions, Inc. is an American film and television production company founded by actress, director and producer Elizabeth Banks and Max Handelman. It is known for producing films in the Pitch Perfect franchise, Charlie's Angels (2019) and Cocaine Bear (2023).

== History ==
Brownstone Productions was founded in October 2002 in Santa Clarita, California by actress, director and producer Elizabeth Banks and her husband, sportswriter and producer Max Handelman. As of 2019, the company is headquartered at the Universal Studios Lot in Universal City, California.

In January 2015, the company signed a two-year first-look deal with Universal Pictures from 2015 to 2017. In June 2015, Brownstone signed a multi year production deal with Warner Bros. Television. In 2019, the company re-signed its first-look deal with Universal Pictures, and production deal with Warner Bros. Television. In June 2021, the company signed a first-look and multi-project development podcasting deal with Amazon, Inc.'s Audible.

In June 2025, the company signed a first-look deal with Universal Television.

== Filmography ==
=== Films ===
Year	Title	Director	Gross (worldwide)	Notes	Ref.
2009	Surrogates	Jonathan Mostow	$122.4 million	Co-production with Mandeville Films, Top Shelf Productions, and Touchstone Pictures	
2012	Pitch Perfect	Jason Moore	$115.4 million	Co-production with Gold Circle Films and Universal Pictures	
2015	Pitch Perfect 2	Elizabeth Banks	$287.5 million	Co-production with Gold Circle Films and Universal Pictures	
2017	The Most Hated Woman in America	Tommy O'Haver	—N/a	Co-production with Untitled Entertainment	
2017	Pitch Perfect 3	Trish Sie	$185.4 million	Co-production with Gold Circle Films and Universal Pictures	
2017	Yours Sincerely, Lois Weber	Svetlana Cvetko	—N/a	A short documentary, co-production with Double Take Pictures and Metabook Films	
2019	Charlie's Angels	Elizabeth Banks	$73.3 million	Co-production with 2.0 Entertainment, The Cantillon Company, Flower Films, Perfect World Pictures, and Columbia Pictures	
2023	Cocaine Bear	Elizabeth Banks	$90 million	Co-production with Lord Miller Productions, Jurassic Party Productions and Universal Pictures	
2023	Bottoms	Emma Seligman	$13.6 million	Co-production with Orion Pictures	
2026	DreamQuil	Alex Prager	TBA	with Patriot Pictures, Landay Entertainment, Arts & Sciences, Big Valley Pictures, Republic Pictures, and HanWay Films	

==== In development ====
- Bad Hand (with Searchlight Pictures)
- Betas (with Universal Pictures)
- Girls Just Want to Have Fun (with Alcon Entertainment)
- Harness (with Orion Pictures)
- The Magic School Bus (with Legendary Entertainment, Marc Platt Productions, and Scholastic Entertainment)
- Three Months Later

=== Television ===
Year	Title	Network	Notes	Ref.
2015	Resident Advisors	Hulu	Co-production with 301 Productions, Relief Productions, and Paramount Digital Entertainment	
2019–2021	Shrill	Hulu	Co-production with Broadway Video, Rushfield Productions, and Warner Bros. Television	
2019–present	Press Your Luck	ABC	Co-production with The Carruthers Company and Fremantle	
2022	Pitch Perfect: Bumper in Berlin	Peacock	Co-production with Mme. Anagram, Gold Circle Films, and Universal Television	
2025	The Better Sister	Amazon Prime Video	Co-production with Iron Ocean, Fortunate Jack Productions, Tomorrow Studios, and Amazon MGM Studios	
2026	The Miniature Wife	Peacock	with Sad Ice Cream Inc. and Media Res	

==== In development ====
- Crush (with Littleton Road Productions, Pageboy Productions, Universal Content Productions, and Universal Television)
- Pitch Perfect: K-Pop Idols (with Gold Circle Films and Universal Television)
- Untitled Karen Read limited series (with David E. Kelley Productions, Wondery, Law&Crime, and Warner Bros Television)

== Podcasts ==
Year	Title	Host(s)	Provider	Genre	Notes	Ref.
2021–present	My Body, My Podcast	Elizabeth Banks	Audible	Wellness, sex, motherhood	With Audible Originals	
2021–present	Fugly	Elizabeth Banks	Audible	Comedy	With Audible Originals	
