= Pitch Perfect: Bumper in Berlin =

American comedy television series

- Promotional poster
- Genre: Musical; Comedy
- Based on: Characters by Kay Cannon
- Developed by: Megan Amram & Elizabeth Banks
- Starring: Adam DeVine; Sarah Hyland; Jameela Jamil; Lera Abova; Flula Borg
- Music by: Leo Birenberg; Zach Robinson
- Country of origin: United States
- Original language: English
- No. of seasons: 1
- No. of episodes: 6

Production
- Executive producers: Christoph Fisser; Henning Molfenter; Charlie Woebcken; Todd Strauss-Schulson; Richie Keen; Adam DeVine; Paul Brooks; Scott Niemeyer; Elizabeth Banks; Max Handelman; Megan Amram
- Production location: Berlin
- Cinematography: Mike Spragg; Agnesh Pakozdi
- Editors: Spencer Houck; Monika Radwanska; Kristi Shimek; Matthew Jensen
- Running time: 27–31 minutes
- Production companies: Brownstone Productions; Gold Circle Films; Mme. Anagram; Universal Television

Original release
- Network: Peacock
- Release: November 23, 2022

Pitch Perfect: Bumper in Berlin is an American musical comedy television series developed by Megan Amram and Elizabeth Banks based on characters created by Kay Cannon. It is a television series spin-off of the film series Pitch Perfect. The series premiered on Peacock on November 23, 2022. In January 2023, the series was renewed for a second season. In September 2023, Peacock decided not to move forward with the second season due to the 2023 SAG-AFTRA strike and the 2023 Writers Guild of America strike.

== Cast and characters ==
=== Main ===
- Adam DeVine as Bumper Allen
- Sarah Hyland as Heidi, Pieter's assistant who is also a secret songwriter. She is an American, but was an army brat.
- Jameela Jamil as Gisela, a former member of DSM and Pieter's ex-girlfriend
- Lera Abova as DJ Das Boot / Thea, Pieter's sister who is a famous Berlin DJ and music producer
- Flula Borg as Pieter Krämer, a former member of Das Sound Machine (DSM) and a music manager. DSM was disbanded after a public lip syncing scandal.

=== Recurring ===
- Katharina Thalbach as Ursula, the matron of the hostel

== Episodes ==
No.	Title	Directed by	Written by	Original release date
1	"Backpfeifengesicht" "A Face in Need of a Slap"	Todd Strauss-Schulson	Teleplay by : Megan Amram; Story by : Megan Amram & Elizabeth Banks	November 23, 2022
2	"Torschlusspanik" "The Feeling That Your One Window of Opportunity Is Closing"	Todd Strauss-Schulson	Sono Patel & Rajat Suresh & Jeremy Levick	November 23, 2022
3	"Verschlimmbessern" "To Make Something Worse While Trying to Make It Better"	Richie Keen	Noah Garfinkel	November 23, 2022
4	"Streicheleinheit" "The Feeling of Yearning for Love and Affection"	Richie Keen	Kathleen Chen & Brian Polk	November 23, 2022
5	"Mutterseelenallein" "The Mother of All Loneliness"	Maureen Bharoocha	Leah Beckmann	November 23, 2022
6	"Lebensabschnittspartner" "The Person You Are with at the Moment"	Richie Keen	Kassia Miller	November 23, 2022

== Production ==
On September 21, 2021, Peacock gave a straight-to-series order to reboot the Pitch Perfect film series. The series was created by Megan Amram, who executive produced alongside Elizabeth Banks, Max Handelman, Paul Brooks, Scott Neimeyer, and Adam DeVine. DeVine starred, reprising his role from the film series. Brownstone Productions, Gold Circle Films, and Universal Television were involved in producing the series. On January 25, 2022, Flula Borg joined the main cast to reprise his role from Pitch Perfect 2. On February 10, 2022, it was reported that Todd Strauss-Schulson would direct the first two episodes of the series and executive produce the pilot. On March 4, 2022, Sarah Hyland, Jameela Jamil, and Lera Abova were cast as series regulars. A cappella experts Deke Sharon and Ed Boyer returned to arrange and vocal produce the a cappella performances. On January 9, 2023, Peacock renewed the series for a second season. Filming on the series began in March 2022 in Berlin during the COVID-19 pandemic.

On September 21, 2023, the second season of Pitch Perfect: Bumper in Berlin was scrapped due to the 2023 SAG-AFTRA strike and the 2023 Writers Guild of America strike.

== Release ==
The series was released on Peacock on November 23, 2022. The show can be seen on the W Network in Canada and via the Stack TV add-on with Prime Video.

== Reception ==
The review aggregator website Rotten Tomatoes reported an approval rating of 46% with an average rating of 6/10, based on 13 critic reviews. The website's critics consensus reads, "This unlikely spinoff has a surprising amount of heart, but Bumper in the Berlin can only sustain its thin premise for so long before the whole concept goes off-key." Metacritic, which uses a weighted average, assigned a score of 46 out of 100 based on 5 critics, indicating "mixed or average reviews".
