= Shelley Regner =

American actress and singer (born 1988)

- Born: Shelley Anne Regner; December 21, 1988 (age 36); Baton Rouge, Louisiana, U.S.
- Occupation(s): Actress, singer
- Years active: 2010–present

Shelley Anne Regner (born December 21, 1988) is an American actress and singer, known for her role as Ashley Jones in the Pitch Perfect film series (2012–2017). She is also known as a past member of Disney's a cappella group, DCappella.

== Life and career ==
Regner was born and raised in the Baton Rouge area, the daughter of Jan and Donald Regner, a businessman. She has a sister, Lauren Regner, who is also a performer. She is a graduate of Parkview Baptist High School, and graduated from Louisiana State University with a degree in theatre in 2011. In college, she was a member of the sorority Kappa Delta. In Baton Rouge, she performed at the Theatre Baton Rouge in productions of Rent as Maureen and The Producers. While at LSU, she performed in the musical Spring Awakening. In 2010, she played the role of Crystal in Little Shop of Horrors at the Ascension Community Theatre.

She performed in the musical Spank, a spoof of Fifty Shades of Grey, in 2014. Regner also performed in Bronies: The Musical, a show about My Little Pony. Regner played the role of Nadia in the pop-opera Bare in Los Angeles and the role of Cecile Caldwell in a musical version of Cruel Intentions. She played the role of Amy in Company at the Cabrillo Music Theater. Regner performed in the show American Idiot in Los Angeles in 2015.

Regner's most prominent role has been as Ashley in the Pitch Perfect film series. She was cast in the role after an open-call audition held in Baton Rouge; much of the film and its sequel were filmed in Baton Rouge and at Louisiana State University. She has also performed as Liz in the film What Happened Last Night.

Regner and Pitch Perfect co-star Kelley Jakle performed in a special concert titled Total Vocal at Carnegie Hall conducted by Deke Sharon in March 2015, and she returned as a special guest again in 2018 and 2019.

In April 2018, Regner joined Disney Music Group's new a cappella group, DCappella, as a mezzo, alongside The Voice finalist Orlando Dixon, Newsies performer Morgan Keene, and vocalists Antonio Fernandez, RJ Woessner, Sojourner Brown, and Joe Santoni. The group's first single is a cover of Fall Out Boy's "Immortals" from the Walt Disney Animation Studios film Big Hero 6. In March, 2019, she left DCappella and was replaced by Kalen Kelly.

== Filmography ==
=== Film ===
Year	Title	Role	Notes
2012	Pitch Perfect	Ashley Jones	
2013	Fat Planet	Jane Ravish	
2015	Pitch Perfect 2	Ashley Jones	
2016	What Happened Last Night	Liz	
2017	The Portal	Becky / The Sneak	Segment: "The Sneak"
2017	Pitch Perfect 3	Ashley Jones	
2020	Running with Fear	Kenzie	
2020	Monster Killers	The Sneak	Segment: "The Sneak"
2020	Adverse	Chris McMillan	
2023	Waking Nightmare	Jordan	

=== Television ===
Year	Title	Role	Notes
2012	Tattoo Nightmares	Kara	Episode: "Pinup Problems"
2013	Singled!	Clarissa	Episode: "Reefer Badness"
2015	Chapters of Horror	Becky / The Sneak	Episode: "The Sneak"
2015	McMann & Bernstein	Beth Nash	8 episodes
2015–2016	TMI Hollywood	Various / Host	5 episodes
2016	Youthful Daze	Mallorie Watson Kingsly	78 episodes
2017	New Dogs, Old Tricks	Liz Nesmith	Main role
2021	Seven Sitters in July	Patricia	Episode #1.1
2023	Underdeveloped	Georgina	6 episodes

=== Music video ===
Year	Title	Role	Artist(s)
2020	"Love On Top"	Ashley Jones	Cast of Pitch Perfect
