= DCappella =

American a cappella group

- Origin: United States
- Genres: Disney music; a cappella; teen pop; pop
- Years active: 2018–2023
- Label: Walt Disney Records
- Past members: Antonio Fernandez; Joe Santoni; Morgan Keene; Orlando Dixon; Kalen Kelly; Shelley Regner; Sojourner Brown; Kelly Denice Taylor; RJ Woessner
- Website: dcappellalive.com

DCappella was an a cappella group formed via a national search and run by Disney Music Group featuring Disney songs. The group originally consisted of Antonio Fernandez, Joe Santoni, Morgan Keene, Orlando Dixon, RJ Woessner, Shelley Regner, and Sojourner Brown: Kalen Kelly and Kelly Denice Taylor joined the group after Regner and Brown left. Deke Sharon was DCappella’s co-creator, music director, arranger and producer.

== History ==
DCappella was conceived in 2012 with auditions starting in November 2017. Then it was announced in December 2017 as being formed by Disney Music Group through a nationwide search for talent run by Deke Sharon. Plans at the time was for a seven member group, soprano, mezzo, alto, tenor, high baritone, low bass and vocal percussionist. On April 29, 2018, the seven members were confirmed to be Newsies star Morgan Keene as the soprano, Pitch Perfect star Shelley Regner as the mezzo, Tony Awards performer Sojourner Brown as the alto, Saturday Night Live performer and former The Sing Off contestant RJ Woessner as the tenor, The Voice finalist Orlando Dixon as the baritone, Hunkapella member Joe Santoni as the bass, and American Music Machine member Antonio Fernandez as the vocal percussionist. In January 2018, a list of 14 member was released, as at the time, Disney planned for two separate touring teams within DCappella group but settled with one group of seven instead.

Disney Music released the group's first single, "Immortals" from Disney's "Big Hero 6" on April 27, 2018. DCappella made its first appearance on American Idol's Disney Night April 29, 2018. The group gave its first concert performance over Memorial Day weekend 2018 as the opening act to Disney's Beauty and the Beast Live in Concert at the Hollywood Bowl along with ABC's first Idol winner Maddie Poppe. The group's debut self titled album was released on November 16, 2018.

DCappella's first tour started in Jacksonville, Florida, in January 2019 and ended two months later in Oakland, California. Regner was replaced as mezzo by Kalen Kelly in May 2019. On October 25, 2019, they released their first holiday album called Rockin Holiday. In March 2020, Brown was replaced by Kelly Denice Taylor. Taylor left the group on May 9, 2022 and Woessner left on February 20, 2023. The group disbanded on June 3, 2023.

== Members ==
- Vocal percussion
  - Antonio Fernandez
  - RJ Woessner (when Antonio is singing)
  - Tracy Robertson (2018)
- Bass
  - Joe Santoni
  - Jojo Otseidu (2018)
- Soprano
  - Morgan Keene
  - Holly Gyenes (2018)
- Baritone
  - Orlando Dixon
  - Antonio Fernandez (when he is singing)
  - Jessie Nunn known as J.None (2018)
- Mezzo
  - Shelley Regner (April 29, 2018 – May 22, 2019)
  - Kalen Kelly (2018, May 22, 2019 – June 3, 2023)
- Alto
  - Sojourner Brown (April 29, 2018 – March 18, 2020)
  - Kyana Fanene (2018)
  - Kelly Denice Taylor (March 20, 2020 – May 9, 2022)
- Tenor
  - RJ Woessner (April 29, 2018 – February 20, 2023)
  - Connor Smith (2018)

== Lineup ==
Period	Baritone	Bass	Soprano	Mezzo	Alto	Vocal Percussionist	Tenor
April 29, 2018 – May 22, 2019	Orlando Dixon	Joe Santoni	Morgan Keene	Shelley Regner	Sojourner Brown	Antonio Fernandez	RJ Woessner
May 22, 2019 – March 18, 2020	Orlando Dixon	Joe Santoni	Morgan Keene	Kalen Kelly	Sojourner Brown	Antonio Fernandez	RJ Woessner
March 20, 2020 – May 9, 2022	Orlando Dixon	Joe Santoni	Morgan Keene	Kalen Kelly	Kelly Denice Taylor	Antonio Fernandez	RJ Woessner

== Music ==
All music is composed by Michael Giacchino, except where noted, and additional music by Giacchino.

Incredibles 2: Original Motion Picture Soundtrack digital version bonus tracks
No.	Title	Length
33.	"Here Comes Elastigirl – Elastigirl's Theme"	1:20
34.	"Chill or Be Chilled – Frozone's Theme"	1:36
35.	"Pow! Pow! Pow! – Mr. Incredible's Theme"	1:31
36.	"The Glory Days"	1:39

=== Albums ===
All music are arranged by Deke Sharon

DCappella (November 16, 2018)
No.	Title	Writer(s)	From	Length
1.	"Tune Up"			:37
2.	"The World Es Mi Familia"	Germaine Franco; Adrian Molina; Michael Giacchino	Coco	:37
3.	"Friend Like Me"	Howard Ashman; Alan Menken	Aladdin	2:19
4.	"How Far I'll Go"	Lin-Manuel Miranda	Moana	2:42
5.	"Let it Go/Do You Want to Build a Snowman"	Kristen Anderson-Lopez; Robert Lopez	Frozen	2:42
6.	"I Wan'na Be like You (The Monkey Song)"	Richard M. Sherman; Robert B. Sherman	The Jungle Book	3:50
7.	"You'll Be in My Heart"	Phil Collins	Tarzan	3:09
8.	"When She Loved Me"	Randy Newman	Toy Story 2	3:14
9.	"Trashin' the Camp"	Phil Collins	Tarzan	2:03
10.	"Part of Your World/A Whole New World"	Howard Ashman; Alan Menken; Tim Rice	The Little Mermaid/Aladdin	3:16
11.	"Step in Time"	Sherman Brothers	Mary Poppins	2:25
12.	"Immortals"	Patrick Stump; Pete Wentz; Joe Trohman; Andy Hurley	Big Hero 6	3:42
13.	"Remember Me"	Kristen Anderson-Lopez; Robert Lopez	Coco	2:38

Japanese version (May 15, 2019)
No.	Title	Writer(s)	From	Length
14.	"A Whole New World"	Tim Rice; Alan Menken	Aladdin	2:39
15.	"Beauty and the Beast"	Howard Ashman; Alan Menken	Beauty and the Beast	3:59
16.	"Circle of Life / He lives in You"	Elton John; Tim Rice; Lebo M; Mark Mancina; Jay Rifkin	The Lion King/The Lion King II: Simba's Pride	3:38
17.	"Under the Sea"	Howard Ashman; Alan Menken	The Little Mermaid	2:53
18.	"Thanks to You (From Tokyo DisneySea 1st Anniversary)"	Kevin Quinn; Tim Heintz		3:30

Rockin Holiday (October 25, 2019)
No.	Title	Length
1.	"Last Christmas"	3:20
2.	"Rockin' Around the Christmas Tree"	1:47
3.	"Jingle Bell Rock"	1:43
4.	"All I Want for Christmas Is You"	3:47
5.	"Feliz Navidad"	2:25

=== Singles ===
Singles
No.	Title	Writer(s)	On album (Released)	Length
1.	"Immortals" (from Big Hero 6)	Patrick Stump; Pete Wentz; Joe Trohman; Andy Hurley	DCappella (April 27, 2018)	3:42
2.	"How Far I'll Go" (from Moana)	Lin-Manuel Miranda	DCappella (August 10, 2018)	2:42
3.	"Trashin' the Camp" (from Tarzan)	Phil Collins	DCappella (September 28, 2018)	2:03
4.	"Last Christmas"	George Michael	(September 28, 2018)	3:20
5.	"All I Want for Christmas Is You"	Mariah Carey; Walter Afanasieff	(September 28, 2018)	3:47
6.	"Part of Your World" (from The Little Mermaid)	Howard Ashman; Alan Menken	DCappella (February 15, 2019)	3:01
7.	"Ready for This" (features JD McCrary)		(August 2, 2019)	1:14
8.	"Speechless" (from Aladdin)	Benj Pasek; Justin Paul; Alan Menken	(September 6, 2019)	3:24
9.	"Circle of Life/He Lives in You" (from The Lion King/The Lion King II: Simba's Pride)	Elton John; Tim Rice; Lebo M; Mark Mancina; Jay Rifkin	(October 11, 2019)	3:38
10.	"I See the Light" (from Tangled)	Glenn Slater; Alan Menken	(November 8, 2019)	3:08
11.	"Get'cha Head in the Game" (from High School Musical)	Ray Cham; Greg Cham; Drew Seeley; David Lawrence; Faye Greenberg	(December 6, 2019)	2:21
12.	"Ev'rybody Wants to Be a Cat*" (from The Aristocats)	Floyd Huddleston; Al Rinker	(January 10, 2020)	2:40
13.	"I Just Can't Wait to Be King" (from The Lion King)	Tim Rice; Elton John	(February 7, 2020)	2:24
14.	"I'll Make a Man Out of You" (from Mulan (1998 film))	David Zippel; Matthew Wilder	(February 28, 2020)	3:08
15.	"All I Want" (from High School Musical: The Musical: The Series)	Olivia Rodrigo	(March 27, 2020)	3:02
16.	"I2I" (from A Goofy Movie)	Patrick Deremer & Roy Freeland	(April 10, 2020)	2:57
17.	"Into the Unknown" (from Frozen II)	Kristen Anderson-Lopez·Robert Lopez	(April 24, 2020)	2:43
18.	"You're Welcome (song)" (from Moana)	Lin-Manuel Miranda	(May 15, 2020)	2:43
19.	"Hawaiian Roller Coaster Ride" (from Lilo & Stitch)	Mark Kealiʻi Hoʻomalu	(June 10, 2020)	2:49
20.	"Just Around the Riverbend/Colors of the Wind" (from Pocahontas (1995 film))	Stephen Schwartz; Alan Menken	(June 19, 2020)	4:35
21.	"Go the Distance*" (from Hercules)	David Zippel; Alan Menken	(September 4, 2020)	2:43
22.	"The Nightmare Before Christmas Medley" (from The Nightmare Before Christmas)	Danny Elfman	(October 2, 2020)	3:05

*The lead vocals in these songs are sung by Antonio Fernandez. RJ Woessner takes the vocal percussionist role in these cases.

== Appearances and presentations ==
- American Idol (ABC) Disney Night, April 29, 2018 performing Disney Medley
- Disney's Beauty and the Beast Live in Concert (Hollywood Bowl) Memorial Day weekend of May 28, 2018 opening act
- The Wonderful World of Disney: Magical Holiday Celebration (ABC) Thursday, November 29, 2019
- Disney Parks Magical Christmas Day Parade (ABC) December 25, 2019 performing "Last Christmas"
- Total Vocal fifth annual concert (Carnegie Hall) March 24, 2019

=== Tours ===
- Live A Cappella Concert Experience (January to March 2019) US, 40 stops in about two months with a special “Friend Like Me” Meet and Greet Experience packages
- National tour (August to September 2019) Japan, 9 stops
- 2nd National Tour (August 5 – September 9, 2022) Japan, 7 stops

== Awards ==
Year	Nominee / work	Award	Result
A Cappella Video Awards (AVA)
2019	"Immortals"	Best Rock Video	Won
2019	"Immortals"	Outstanding Special/Visual Effects	Nominated
2019	"Immortals"	Outstanding Video Editing	Nominated
2019	"Immortals"	Best Soundtrack Video	Nominated
2019	"Immortals"	Best Video by a Professional Group	Nominated
Contemporary A Cappella Recording Awards (CARA)
2019	Deke Sharon for "Immortals"	Best Professional Arrangement for a Non-Scholastic Group	Won
2019	DCappella	Contemporary A Cappella Recording Awards (CARA) Best Debut Album	Runner-up
2019	"Immortals"	Contemporary A Cappella Recording Awards (CARA) Best Rock Song	Runner-up
2019	"The Glory Days"	Contemporary A Cappella Recording Awards (CARA) Best Soundtrack Song	Runner-up
