= Pitch Perfect 3 =

2017 film by Trish Sie

- Theatrical release poster
- Directed by: Trish Sie
- Screenplay by: Kay Cannon; Mike White
- Story by: Kay Cannon
- Based on: Characters by Mickey Rapkin
- Produced by: Paul Brooks; Max Handelman; Elizabeth Banks
- Starring: Anna Kendrick; Rebel Wilson; Hailee Steinfeld; Brittany Snow; Anna Camp; Hana Mae Lee; Alexis Knapp; John Michael Higgins; Elizabeth Banks; John Lithgow
- Cinematography: Matthew Clark
- Edited by: Craig Alpert; Colin Patton
- Music by: Christopher Lennertz
- Production companies: Universal Pictures; Gold Circle Entertainment; Perfect World Pictures; Brownstone Productions
- Distributed by: Universal Pictures
- Release dates: November 30, 2017 (Sydney); December 22, 2017 (United States)
- Running time: 93 minutes
- Country: United States
- Language: English
- Budget: $45 million
- Box office: $185 million

Pitch Perfect 3 is a 2017 American musical comedy film directed by Trish Sie and written by Kay Cannon and Mike White. It is the sequel to Pitch Perfect 2 (2015), and the third film in the Pitch Perfect trilogy. The film features Anna Kendrick, Rebel Wilson, Hailee Steinfeld, Brittany Snow, Anna Camp, Hana Mae Lee, Ester Dean, Chrissie Fit, Alexis Knapp, Kelly Jakle, Shelley Regner, John Michael Higgins, and Elizabeth Banks—all reprising their roles from previous films—as well as John Lithgow, DJ Khaled, Ruby Rose, Matt Lanter, and Guy Burnet. The plot follows the a cappella group the Bellas, who have graduated from college and are reuniting for one final performance together as part of a USO tour.

Principal photography for Pitch Perfect 3 began in January 2017 in Atlanta, Georgia, and ended that April. The film was released in the United States by Universal Pictures on December 22, 2017, and received mixed reviews from critics, who deemed it inferior to its predecessors. Nevertheless, it grossed $185 million worldwide against its $45 million budget. It became the second-highest grossing musical comedy film of all time, behind Pitch Perfect 2.

== Plot ==
Three years after the events of the second film, the Bellas have graduated from Barden University, but they all hate their jobs. Beca and Amy, whose respective relationships with Jesse and Bumper ended some time during the three years, are now roommates along with Chloe in New York City.

They are invited alongside the remaining Bellas by Emily, now a senior and leader of the current Barden Bellas, to an event under the impression they will be performing, only to discover they are merely guests. Disappointed, they reconvene at a bar and express how much they miss performing with each other.

Aubrey convinces the group to join a USO tour headlined by DJ Khaled, hoping her father will finally watch her perform. As Stacie is eight months pregnant and unable to tour, Emily takes her place.

The Bellas land at a base in Rota, Spain, greeted by liaison soldiers Chicago and Zeke. They also meet the other three bands on the tour, which use musical instruments, making the Bellas feel out of place. Chloe begins to fall for Chicago.

Fat Amy learns that Fergus, her estranged father (who is also a ruthless international crime lord), has found her at their hotel. The Bellas are invited to a party at DJ Khaled's suite, where Beca develops a friendship with DJ Khaled's music producer, Theo, who is impressed when she easily produces a mix of her singing on Khaled's editing equipment.

Moments later, the party is thrown into chaos when Aubrey accidentally starts a fire. Meanwhile, Amy sneaks off to a poker tournament, which is revealed to be a ruse by Fergus in order to get back into Amy's life, which she agrees to after believing he has changed.

While the Bellas are recovering from ruining DJ Khaled's party, Stacie calls to inform them that she has given birth to a girl, whom she has named Bella. The news inspires the group to continue performing, and their shows go down very well with the troops.

Fergus and Amy gradually make up, until he accidentally reveals that he is only trying to acquire her US $180 million offshore account created by Amy's mother, causing Amy to disown her father. Meanwhile, DJ Khaled asks Beca to open for him without the other Bellas. Beca declines the offer and returns to her room, and doesn't tell the group she was asked.

The Bellas (without Beca and Amy) are abducted and taken aboard Fergus' yacht, as an attempt to manipulate Amy. When she and Beca learn of the kidnapping, they sneak on board. Beca distracts Fergus by leading the Bellas in a performance of "Toxic" while Amy sets up and detonates a bomb.

The Bellas escape the yacht, and Fergus is later arrested. After the Bellas are rescued by the military, Amy reveals DJ Khaled's proposition to Beca to the others. They encourage her to take the chance, agreeing that it is time to move on with their lives. They know they will stay connected to each other as a family.

At the final USO performance, Beca opens for DJ Khaled, then brings the Bellas onstage to sing their final performance – "Freedom! '90". Gail and John, the public announcers when the Bellas originally competed, have filmed a Bella documentary, only to be appalled when John realises they did not record the Bellas' final performance.

Now the Bellas' lives are improving: Amy uses her new bankroll for tributes to singers named Amy; Aubrey works as a birthing coach; Flo's juice cart becomes an international brand; Chloe gets into vet school; Cynthia-Rose enlists in the USAF flight school; Emily returns to Barden and her songwriting; Lilly reveals that she was quiet because she was possessed by Satan, the bomb snapped her out of it, and her real name is Esther, and starts a relationship with DJ Dragon Nutz; Aubrey reconnects with her father; Chloe and Chicago become an item; Beca is now Theo's boss.

== Cast ==
- Anna Kendrick as Beca Mitchell, an alumna and the leader of the Barden Bellas, who works as a producer but quits due to creative differences, before joining the tour.
- Rebel Wilson as Patricia "Fat Amy" Hobart, an overconfident, comedic alumna member of The Barden Bellas, from Australia. She held a one-woman show, "Fat Amy Winehouse", before joining the tour.
- Hailee Steinfeld as Emily Junk, a senior student at Barden University and later joins the new Barden Bellas, who joins her former classmates for the tour.
- Brittany Snow as Chloe Beale, a member Barden Bellas and former co-leader, who longs for glory days with the Bellas. She applied to attend a vet school before joining the tour.
- Anna Camp as Aubrey Posen, a Barden Bellas alumna and former leader, before Beca, who worked at the Lodge of Fallen Leaves. Through her father, the Bellas were invited to the USO tour.
- John Lithgow as Fergus Hobart, Fat Amy's estranged criminal father
- DJ Khaled as himself
- Hana Mae Lee as Lilly Onakuramara/Esther, a Barden Bellas alumna known for her quiet speaking voice and odd remarks. She worked as a tailor before joining the tour.
- Ester Dean as Cynthia Rose Adams, a tough tomboy Barden Bellas alumna, who failed the Flight School simulation before joining the tour.
- Chrissie Fit as Florencia "Flo" Fuentes, a Barden Bellas alumna, from Guatemala. She worked at a juice truck before joining the tour.
- Ruby Rose as Calamity, lead singer of the band Evermoist
- Alexis Knapp as Stacie Conrad, a member Barden Bellas alumna, known for being overly sexual. She works as a pilates instructor and despite wanting to, could not join the tour due to her pregnancy.
- Kelley Jakle as Jessica Smith, a member Barden Bellas.
- Shelley Regner as Ashley Jones, a member Barden Bellas.
- Matt Lanter as Chicago, a U.S. soldier guiding the Bellas during the tour, and Chloe's love interest.
- Guy Burnet as Theo, DJ Khaled's music producer, who takes a liking to Beca
- Andy Allo as Serenity, a member of Evermoist
- Hannah Fairlight as Veracity, a member of Evermoist
- Venzella Joy Williams as Charity, drummer for Evermoist
- John Michael Higgins as John Smith, an a cappella commentator making an insulting documentary about The Bellas
- Elizabeth Banks as Gail Abernathy-McKadden-Feinberger, the other a cappella commentator making an insulting documentary about The Bellas

Additionally, Trinidad James appears as Young Sparrow, D.J. Looney appears as DJ Dragon Nutz, Whiskey Shivers appears as the group Saddle Up, Troy Ian Hall appears as Zeke, Moisés Arias appears as Pimp-Lo, Jessica Chaffin appears as Evan, and Michael Rose appears as Aubrey's Father.

== Production ==
On April 11, 2015, a month before the release of the second film, it was announced that Rebel Wilson would return for a third film, although she stated that she did not know if Anna Kendrick or other cast members would also reprise their roles. She added that she would be "up for a Fat Amy spin-off". Director and producer of the second film Elizabeth Banks acknowledged the possibility of a third film during promotion of Pitch Perfect 2, saying, "it would be disingenuous to say that no one’s talking about a Pitch Perfect 3; the possibility of it."

On June 10, 2015, a third film was officially confirmed, and Kay Cannon was set to return to write the script. On June 15, 2015, it was announced that Kendrick and Wilson would both reprise their roles, and on July 28, 2015, Brittany Snow signed on to return as well. Paul Brooks again produced for Gold Circle Films, along with Banks and Max Handelman for Brownstone Productions. On October 27, 2015, Banks was officially announced to return as director for the film, though she exited in that capacity on June 3, 2016. On September 1, 2016, Trish Sie was confirmed to direct the film. On December 13, 2016, it was reported that Ruby Rose was in talks to join the cast, while Anna Camp signed on to return for the sequel. Cannon wrote the script with later drafts by Mike White and Dana Fox; White would eventually receive screenwriting credits alongside Cannon. On January 5, 2017, a table read occurred, with Ester Dean, Hana Mae Lee, Chrissie Fit, Kelley Jakle, and Shelley Regner also being confirmed to reprise their roles, and singer Andy Allo joining as Charity, a rival in a group opposing the Bellas. Alexis Knapp returned as Stacie Conrad in a cameo performance.

=== Filming ===
Principal photography on the film began on January 5, 2017, and took place in Atlanta, Georgia, Cádiz, Spain, and Nice, France, wrapping on April 3, 2017.

The closing credits included outtakes, rehearsals and behind the scenes footage of the actresses spending time together during production of all three films in the series.

== Release ==
Pitch Perfect 3 was initially scheduled for release on July 21, and then August 4, 2017. It had its world premiere in Sydney, Australia, on November 30, 2017, and was released in the United States on December 22, 2017.

== Reception ==
=== Box office ===
Pitch Perfect 3 grossed $104.9 million in the United States and Canada and $80.5 million in other territories, for a worldwide total of $185 million, against a production budget of $45 million.

In the United States and Canada, Pitch Perfect 3 was released alongside the openings of Downsizing and Father Figures, as well as the wide expansions of The Shape of Water and Darkest Hour. The movie was projected to gross $27–35 million from 3,447 theaters in its opening weekend. The film took in $2.1 million from Thursday night previews, about half of the $4.6 million earned by its predecessor. Over the three-day weekend, which included Christmas Eve, it grossed $19.9 million (down nearly 70% from the second film's $69.2 million debut), finishing third at the box office, behind Star Wars: The Last Jedi and Jumanji: Welcome to the Jungle. It grossed an additional $6.5 million on Christmas Day, for a four-day total of $26.4 million. It dropped 15% the following weekend, grossing $16.8 million, and a total of $21.7 million over the four-day New Year's frame.

=== Critical response ===
On Rotten Tomatoes, the film has an approval rating of 29% based on 150 reviews and an average rating of 4.7/10. The website's critical consensus reads, "Pitch Perfect 3 strains to recapture the magic that helped the original spawn a franchise, but ends up sending this increasingly unnecessary trilogy out on a low note." On Metacritic, the film has a weighted average score of 40 out of 100 based on 35 critics. Audiences polled by CinemaScore gave the film an average grade of "A−" on an A+ to F scale, the same score earned by its predecessor.

Owen Gleiberman of Variety praised the cast and said, "The new film doesn't add anything revolutionary to the Pitch Perfect formula. It still sounds like we're in middle-period Glee written by someone who finds Ryan Murphy too solemn. But as directed by Trish Sie, the movie is bubbly, it's fast, it's hella synthetic-clever, and it's an avid showcase for the personalities of its stars."

Frank Scheck for The Hollywood Reporter wrote "... what started out as a charmingly offbeat comic premise has inevitably degenerated into the sort of crass commercialism that probably would make the Bellas themselves turn up their noses."

=== Propaganda allegations ===
Some critics have alleged that Pitch Perfect 3 serves as a channel for US Army propaganda. The production of the film involved extensive collaboration with the United States Army; the army provided services such as military bases, service members and script reviews intended to "make sure the military was shown in a positive light."

=== Accolades ===
Pitch Perfect 3 won Anna Kendrick the Choice Comedy Movie Actress award at the 2018 Teen Choice Awards and nominations for Hailee Steinfeld and Rebel Wilson also for Choice Comedy Movie Actress as well as the film being nominated for Choice Comedy Movie.

== Music ==
The soundtrack to Pitch Perfect 3 was released on December 15, 2017. It consisted of 19 tracks, along with a mashup song "Freedom! '90 x Cups", performed by the cast and the finalists of the 13th season of The Voice led the album as a single on November 21. A special edition album was released on March 2, 2018, which includes three additional tracks.

== Future ==
=== Possible sequel ===
When asked about a sequel to Pitch Perfect 3, director Trish Sie said in December 2017, "Of course that's above my pay grade and I have no idea and am not the one making the decisions but as far as I am concerned, I would see these movies on and on and on until they start sucking. I think whether it's these women in the next stage of life or it's a new group of women going through these things, I think there are endless ways to chart the course of the girls' lives and a woman's life." In 2024, Rebel Wilson confirmed in a BBC Radio 2 interview that "There is one being developed" and stating "I guess they've got to get the script right first, which is the age-old dilemma," giving further potential for a sequel.

=== Spin-off ===
On June 27, 2025, Elizabeth Banks and Max Handelman of Brownstone Productions announced that they are set to produce a spin-off series titled Pitch Perfect: K-Pop Idols. Joel Kim Booster is set to write the series and Jason Moore will be the executive producer and director of the series.
