= Alexis Knapp =

American actress (born 1989)

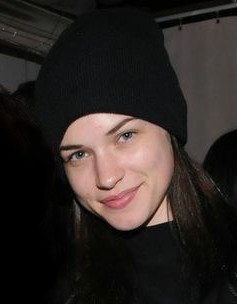
- Knapp in 2013
- Born: Alexis Merizalde Knapp; July 31, 1989 (age 36); Avonmore, Pennsylvania, U.S.
- Occupation: Actress
- Years active: 2007–present
- Children: 1

Alexis Merizalde Knapp (born July 31, 1989) is an American actress and singer. She portrays Stacie Conrad in the Pitch Perfect film series (2012–2017) and Alexis in the party film Project X (2012). She also appeared on the first season of the TBS comedy Ground Floor.

== Early life ==
Knapp was born in Avonmore, Pennsylvania, the daughter of Marjorie and Bradford Elwood Knapp. She grew up in North Carolina before moving to Los Angeles when she was 18.

== Career ==
In 2008, Knapp hosted a popular internet video series titled 'Project Lore', a show about the video game World of Warcraft, and also worked as a model before breaking into acting. She appeared in background roles in Percy Jackson & the Olympians: The Lightning Thief as Aphrodite Girl #9 and in Couples Retreat as a Dance Academy Girl. In 2012, Knapp appeared in her first major roles: Alexis in Project X and the sex-crazed singer Stacie Conrad in Pitch Perfect. She reprised the role of Stacie in Pitch Perfect 2, and made a brief cameo appearance in Pitch Perfect 3. In a 2017 interview, Knapp revealed that playing Stacie was difficult for her because the character was so unlike her.

Knapp appeared in the pilot of ABC's short-lived series Super Fun Night, written by and starring her Pitch Perfect co-star Rebel Wilson. She starred in the Tom Vaughan directed film So Undercover, as Taylor Jaffe. Knapp had a starring role in the first season of the TBS comedy, Ground Floor, portraying Tori, a party girl, who catches up on her sleep at work the next morning, but her character was dropped before the second season. She was cast in the Lifetime pilot Cinnamon Girl, which did not get picked up as a series. Knapp also starred in the independent short film Wracked, as Melissa. In 2017, she starred as Samantha in the Lifetime Christmas television film My Christmas Prince.

== Personal life ==
Knapp dated actor Ryan Phillippe in mid-2010. The relationship ended that September. After their breakup, Knapp discovered that she was pregnant. She gave birth to their daughter in 2011; Phillippe was present during the birth.

== Filmography ==
=== Film ===
Year	Title	Role	Notes
2009	Couples Retreat	San Diego Dance Academy	
2010	Percy Jackson & the Olympians: The Lightning Thief	Aphrodite Girl	
2012	Project X	Alexis	
2012	Pitch Perfect	Stacie Conrad	
2012	So Undercover	Taylor Jaffe	
2013	Vamp U	Samantha	
2013	Cavemen	Kat	
2014	Grace	Jessica	
2014	The Anomaly	Dana	
2015	Pitch Perfect 2	Stacie Conrad	
2016	Urge	Joey	
2017	Pitch Perfect 3	Stacie Conrad	
2021	Phobias	Lia	
2022	The Accursed	Mary Lynn	
2024	One More Shot	Jennifer Lomax	
2024	Another Day in America	Tracy Anderson	
2024	Down Below	Karisma	

=== Television ===
Year	Title	Role	Notes
2010	Look	Dede	1 episode
2012	Like Father	Dylan	Episode: "Pilot"
2013	Cinnamon Girl: California Dreamin'	Lola Jones	Episode: "Pilot"
2013	Family Guy	Girl #3 (voice)	Episode: "Valentine's Day in Quahog"
2013	Super Fun Night	Clamantha	Episode: "Pilot"
2013–2014	Ground Floor	Tori	Main role (season 1)
2014	The Dorm	Vivian Bloom	Television film
2017	My Christmas Prince	Samantha Logan	Television film
2022	The Orville	Irillia	Episode: "Electric Sheep"
