= Hana Mae Lee =

American actress, model, comedian, and fashion designer (born 1988)

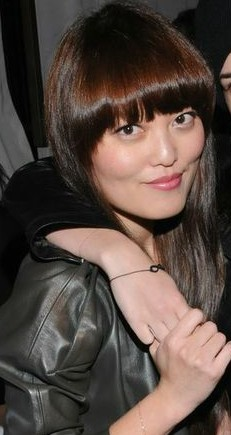
- Lee in September 2013
- Born: September 28, 1988 (age 37); San Fernando Valley, California, U.S.
- Education: Otis College of Art and Design (BFA, fashion design)
- Occupations: Actress; model; comedian; fashion designer
- Years active: 2003–present

Hana Mae Lee (born September 28, 1988) is an American actress, singer, model, comedian and fashion designer. She portrayed Lilly Onakurama in the musical comedy Pitch Perfect film series (2012–2017) and Sonya in the horror comedy film The Babysitter (2017) and its 2020 sequel. Lee also owns the fashion line Hanamahn.

== Early life ==
Lee was born and raised in the San Fernando Valley, California. She is of Korean descent. She attended Granada Hills Charter High School.

Lee enrolled in college at 16. She received her BFA in fashion design from Otis College of Art and Design in Los Angeles, California. She has designed for Juicy Couture, and Mossimo. She turned down working for Ralph Lauren in New York to further pursue acting.

== Career ==
Lee's mother ran a beauty and hair salon for 25 years. At 15, Lee began doing makeup professionally, doing makeovers at Macy's before transitioning to editorial photo shoots. As of 2018, she has opted to forgo makeup work in pursuit of her entertainment career.

At 16, Lee became a professional model. She has appeared in campaigns for Honda, Jeep, Apple Inc., Nokia, Sebastian, American Express, HP, Cherry Coke, and Midori. She has appeared in the magazines TIME, SOMA, Elle, and Teen Vogue.

Lee started doing stand-up comedy in 2009. She is also a part of the comedy duo, Get Gaysian. Lee would often incorporate Korean folk music into her comedy performances.

Lee started her jewelry line, Hanamahn, in 2001. She launched the apparel line for Hanamahn in 2009; several of the pieces have appeared in the Pitch Perfect films. As of 2018, the brand is on hiatus, with a sister line in development.

In 2011, Lee made her TV debut guest starring on Mike & Molly, followed by an appearance on Workaholics.

She appeared as Lilly Onakuramara/Esther in the musical comedy film Pitch Perfect, for which she was nominated for the Teen Choice Award for Choice Movie Scene Stealer in 2013. Lee reprised her role in the sequels Pitch Perfect 2 (2015) and Pitch Perfect 3 (2017).

Lee co-starred in McG's horror film The Babysitter (2017), and reprised her role in the sequel The Babysitter: Killer Queen (2020).

== Filmography ==
=== Film ===
| Year | Title | Role | Notes |
|---|---|---|---|
| 2006 | The Dog Problem | Girl in Cafe | |
| 2007 | Hitler's Bowl | Virginia | Short film |
| 2007 | Eli's Liquor Store | Emma Lee Chung | |
| 2009 | Johnny Raikou | Jaden Adventure | |
| 2011 | It's a Match | Alice Quinn | Short film |
| 2012 | Pitch Perfect | Lilly Onakuramara/Esther | |
| 2013 | Ryan Lochte's 'Pool Water' | Unknown | Short film |
| 2014 | Let's Get Digital | Geneva | Short film |
| 2015 | Pitch Perfect 2 | Lilly Onakuramara/Esther | |
| 2015 | Jem and the Holograms | Roxanne "Roxy" Pellegrini | |
| 2016 | Unleashed | Nina | |
| 2017 | The Babysitter | Sonya | |
| 2017 | Love Beats Rhymes | Julie | |
| 2017 | Pitch Perfect 3 | Lilly Onakuramara/Esther | |
| 2020 | The Babysitter: Killer Queen | Sonya | |
| 2021 | Habit | Jewel | |
| 2021 | Phobias | Sami | |
| 2023 | Abruptio | Chelsea (voice) | |

=== Television ===
| Year | Title | Role | Notes |
|---|---|---|---|
| 2011 | Mike & Molly | Soo-Jin | Episode: "Samuel Gets Fired" |
| 2011 | Workaholics | Hannah | Episode: "Karl's Wedding" |
| 2012–2013 | Lips | Endora | 2 episodes |
| 2012, 2017 | Made in Hollywood | Herself | 2 episodes |
| 2014 | Marry Me | Fantasia Yang | Episode: "Annicurser-Me" |
| 2014 | Super Fun Night | Frankie | 3 episodes |
| 2014 | Californication | Me Suk Kok | Episode: "Dinner with Friends" |
| 2015 | Resident Advisors | PJ | Episode: "Sexiled" |
| 2015 | Ur in Analysis | Mara | Television film |
| 2016–2019 | Those Who Can't | Julie | 6 episodes |
| 2017 | Patriot | Numi Haruno | Recurring role (season 1) |
| 2019 | Perpetual Grace, LTD | Scotty Scholes | Recurring role |
