= Kelley Jakle =

American actress and singer-songwriter

- Occupation(s): Actress, singer-songwriter
- Years active: 2003–present

Kelley Jakle is an American actress and singer-songwriter. She played the role of Jessica Smith in the Pitch Perfect series (2012–2017) and appeared on the first and second seasons of The Sing-Off in 2009 and 2010. She is also a member of an Americana duo band, Robin Alice.

== Early life ==
Jakle was active in music from an early age, performing as part of the Sacramento Children's Chorus, singing The Star-Spangled Banner at sporting events, including a San Francisco 49ers game in 2006, and auditioning for the singing contest American Idol.

After graduating from Loretto High School, Jakle attended the University of Southern California, where she majored in communications. In 2007, Jakle joined the USC a cappella group the SoCal VoCals. During her tenure in the SoCal VoCals, the group won the International Championship of Collegiate A Cappella in 2008 and again in 2010.

In 2009, Jakle took part in season one of The Sing-Off, a singing competition televised on NBC, as part of a group called "The SoCals". The SoCals were eliminated in the third episode. In 2010, Jakle again competed on The Sing-Off, this time as part of "The Backbeats". The Backbeats finished the contest in third place.

== Career ==
Upon graduating from USC, Jakle began working as an actress in Los Angeles. Her first film role was as Jessica in the 2012 musical comedy Pitch Perfect, with Jakle being chosen as a "ringer" due to her background in a cappella, at the request of vocal producer Deke Sharon. In 2013, Jakle appeared in 42, a biographical film about baseball player Jackie Robinson co-starring Harrison Ford as Branch Rickey, Jakle's great-grandfather. Jakle reprised her role as Jessica in Pitch Perfect 2 in 2015 and Pitch Perfect 3 in 2017.

In 2013, Jakle released several singles, including a cover of "Ain't It Fun" by Paramore.

On July 29, 2016, Jakle played the role of Marilyn Monroe in Marilyn! The New Musical at the Alex Theatre in Glendale, California.

Most recently, Jakle appeared as Sarah in Pitch Perfect co-star Anna Kendrick's 2023 directorial debut, Woman of the Hour.

== Personal life ==
Jakle is the great-granddaughter of Major League Baseball executive Branch Rickey.

Jakle is an ambassador for ReACT, a movement in Montana that encourages teenagers not to smoke.

== Filmography ==
Film roles
Year	Title	Role	Notes
2012	Pitch Perfect	Jessica Smith	
2013	42	Alice	
2015	Pitch Perfect 2	Jessica Smith	
2017	Pitch Perfect 3	Jessica Smith	
2023	Parachute	Katie	
2023	Romance in Hawaii	Leah Davis	
2023	Woman of the Hour	Sarah	

Television roles
Year	Title	Role	Notes
2009	The Sing-Off	Herself	Recurring role (seasons 1–2), 8 episodes
2012	Workaholics	Receptionist	Episode: "The Business Trip"
2013	Adam DeVine's House Party	Cynthia	Episode: "Ex-Girlfriend"
2013	#TheAssignment	Kelley	2 episodes
2014–2015	Scorpion	Janice Keller	Episodes: Pilot, "Love Boat"
2015	Uncle Grandpa	Additional voices	Episode: "Pizza Steve's Diary"
2015	Resident Advisors	Female Leslie	2 episodes
2017	Temporary	Lampshade Girl No. 1	Episode: "Shady Art Show"
2018	Christmas Harmony	Harmony	Television film (Lifetime)
2019	Mistletoe and Menorahs	Christy Dickinson	Television film (Lifetime)
2020	A Very Charming Christmas Town	Laurel	Television film (Lifetime)
2020	Black Hearted Killer	Vera	Television film (Lifetime)

Web television roles
Year	Title	Role	Notes
2015	Climate Change Deniers' Anthem	Singer	Funny or Die website
2017	"Poker Face"	Singer	Postmodern Jukebox website

Music video roles
Year	Title	Role	Artist(s)
2017	"10000 Days"	Best Friend	Andy Allo
2018	"Give Me Your Hand"	Herself	Shannon K
2020	"Love On Top"	Jessica Smith	Cast of Pitch Perfect

== Discography ==
=== Extended plays ===
- By the Way (2007)
- Spare Change (2008)

=== Single ===
Year	Single	Album
2013	"Ain't It Fun (Jakle & Sontag Remix)"	Non album single
2013	"For Love"	Non album single
2013	"Free Fallin'"	Non album single
2013	"When You Say Nothing at All"	Non album single
2014	"My Best Case"	Non album single
2014	"Favourite Part of Me"	Non album single
2015	"Best Goodbye"	Tribute to Abby Wambach
2017	"Poker Face"	Postmodern Jukebox release, featured artist
