= John Michael Higgins =

American actor, comedian and game show host (born 1963)

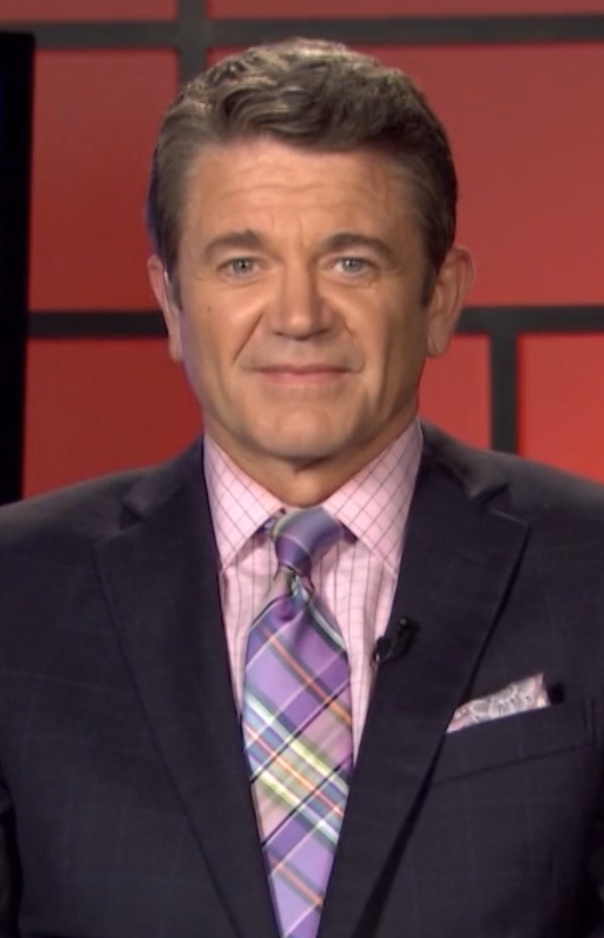
- Higgins in 2018
- Born: February 12, 1963 (age 63); Boston, Massachusetts, U.S.
- Education: Amherst College
- Occupations: Actor; comedian; game show host
- Years active: 1982–present
- Spouse: Margaret Welsh (m. 2003)
- Children: 2

John Michael Higgins (born February 12, 1963) is an American actor, comedian and game show host whose film credits include Christopher Guest's mockumentaries, the role of David Letterman in HBO's The Late Shift, and a starring role in the American version of Kath & Kim. He portrayed Peter Lovett in the TV Land original sitcom Happily Divorced and provided the voice of Iknik Blackstone Varrick in The Legend of Korra and Mini-Max in Big Hero 6: The Series. He also starred in the NBC sitcom Great News as Chuck Pierce for two seasons. From 2018-2022, and 2026–present he hosted the game show America Says, which earned him a 2019 Daytime Emmy Award nomination for Outstanding Game Show Host. Higgins attended Amherst College, graduating in 1985, and was a member of the a cappella group the Zumbyes. From 2023 to 2024, he hosted a new version of the game show Split Second on Game Show Network.

== Early life ==
John Michael Higgins was born on February 12, 1963, in Boston, Massachusetts. His father served as a naval officer, which led the family to relocate frequently across sixteen military bases during Higgins's youth. While his father was stationed in Washington, D.C., Higgins started acting for the first time, performing at the Folger Theatre, Arena Stage and Round House Theatre. Higgins continued acting in plays but also decided to further his education at Amherst College where he studied literature.

Following graduation, Higgins relocated to New York to pursue his acting and theatre career.

== Career ==
In the early 1980s Higgins was a theatre instructor with Street 70, a theatre production company in Rockville, Maryland that is now known as Round House Theatre. He also taught voice and improvisation. In 1991, Higgins was featured in Broadway's La Bête, and in 2000 he was seen Off-Broadway at Second Stage Theatre in a production of Edward Albee's Tiny Alice. He also originated the title role in Paul Rudnick's Jeffrey Off-Broadway in 1993.

Higgins's numerous television credits include recurring characters on Ally McBeal, Brother's Keeper, Boston Legal and Honey, I Shrunk the Kids: The TV Show. In Season 8 of Seinfeld, he portrayed Elaine's boyfriend Kurt. He also played attorney Wayne Jarvis in five episodes of Arrested Development. Higgins arranged the dense vocal harmonies sung by the nine-part ("neuftet") New Main Street Singers in 2003's A Mighty Wind, a change from the writers' original concept of having the group sing in unison, leveraged by Higgins's musical talent.

Higgins gained more recognition by being featured in the films Fun with Dick and Jane, Pitch Perfect and its sequels, and The Break-Up, for which he also wrote vocal arrangements. His work as a voice actor includes the roles of Judge Mentok in Harvey Birdman, Attorney at Law, 2401 Penitent Tangent in Halo 2, and Riddler in Batman: The Brave and the Bold. Since 2012 Higgins has also served as the voice of the recurring character Doug Wheeler on the show Bob's Burgers, occasionally providing other voices as well. Higgins also portrayed David Letterman in the HBO TV film The Late Shift. Higgins was seen in the pre-show video for the Epcot attraction Test Track. However, the ride was refurbished in 2012 and the pre-show room was removed.

Higgins directs and appears on the stage from time to time as well. In 2004, he played Secretary of Defense Donald Rumsfeld in the American premiere of David Hare's Stuff Happens at the Mark Taper Forum in Los Angeles. In 2003, he played the title role in A. R. Gurney's Big Bill at New York's Lincoln Center Theater. He played Phil Knight in the American version of Kath & Kim.

Higgins has been featured in TV ads for DirecTV, alongside fellow co-stars Christopher Guest and Ed Begley Jr., and for Old Navy. He also stars in the second season of TNT's Raising the Bar as an openly gay, rule-obsessed judge. Higgins took part in The Suite Life on Deck, taking the role of the sinister and secluded Mr. Tipton.

In 2011, Higgins was cast in Happily Divorced opposite Fran Drescher. He played Fran's gay ex-husband, Peter Lovett, a character based on Drescher's real-life ex-husband Peter Marc Jacobson. In 2012, Higgins was cast as the voice of vain and eccentric businessman Iknik Blackstone Varrick in The Legend of Korra. Higgins’s would receive acclaim for this role winning best vocal performance in a television series in a supporting role Action/Drama at the 2014 Behind the Voice Actor awards. From 2017 to 2018, Higgins starred as Chuck Pierce on the NBC comedy series Great News.

Higgins would also gain recognition for his role alongside Elizabeth Banks in the trilogy of Pitch Perfect films, with their two characters serving as announcers during all 3 films.

In 2017 Higgins was cast as Tod Crawford in the show Tween Fest. He would receive praise for this role being nominated for a primetime Emmy in the Outstanding actor Award in a short comedy film or drama series category.

Higgins became the host of the game show America Says in 2018. The show originally ran for 5 seasons, going on break for four years, before returning for its sixth season on April 14, 2026. Coincidentally, he played a game show host 14 years earlier in a season 3 episode of the TV comedy/drama detective series Monk. Since 2019, Higgins has appeared in TV commercials for Omaha-based Physicians Mutual Insurance Company. In 2020, Higgins began appearing in a series of adverts for 123.ie, an Irish insurance company. Higgins played the role of Principal Toddman in the 2020 Peacock comedy series Saved by the Bell, which was created by Tracey Wigfield.

He has continued to lend his voice in animated films and shows. He voiced Minimax on the Disney XD series Big Hero 6: The Series from 2018 to 2020. In 2022, he voiced Warren Stone in the Rise of the Teenage Mutant Ninja Turtles: The Movie. Higgins appeared on 2 episodes of Celebrity Jeopardy! that same year.

In 2023, Higgins became the host of the new iteration of the game show Split Second, also serving as executive producer. From 2023 to 2024, Higgins voiced Mayor Anchovy in Baby Shark's Big Show!.

== Personal life ==
Higgins married actress and writer Margaret Welsh on February 1, 2003. They met in Connecticut while actors in George Bernard Shaw's play Arms and the Man. He said he never wanted to date a workmate or marry an actress until he met his wife. They have two children, a daughter and a son.

== Filmography ==
=== Film ===
Year	Title	Role	Notes
1986	National Lampoon's Class of '86	Various characters	
1989	Vampire's Kiss	Ed	
1997	G.I. Jane	Chief of Staff	
1997	Wag the Dog	John Levy	
1999	Bicentennial Man	Bill Feingold	
2000	Seven Days to Live	Social Worker	
2000	Best in Show	Scott Donlan	
2001	The Man Who Wasn't There	Emergency Room Physician	Uncredited
2002	Teddy Bears' Picnic	Whit Summers	
2003	A Mighty Wind	Terry Bohner	
2004	Jiminy Glick in Lalawood	Andre Devine	
2004	After the Sunset	Hotel Manager	Uncredited
2004	Killer Diller	Deermont	
2004	Blade: Trinity	Dr. Edgar Vance	
2005	English as a Second Language	Norman Benjamin	
2005	Fun with Dick and Jane	Garth	
2006	The Break-Up	Richard Meyers	
2006	For Your Consideration	Corey Taft	
2007	Evan Almighty	Marty Stringer	
2007	Fred Claus	Willie	
2007	Walk Hard: The Dewey Cox Story	Record producer	Uncredited
2008	Yes Man	Nick	
2009	Still Waiting...	Dennis	
2009	The Ugly Truth	Larry	
2009	Fired Up	Coach Keith	
2009	Couples Retreat	Therapist	
2010	The Burying Beetle	Philip	Short film
2011	Bad Teacher	Principal Wally Snur	
2011	6 Month Rule	Paul	
2011	We Bought a Zoo	Walter Ferris	
2012	My Uncle Rafael	Damon	
2012	Big Miracle	Wes Handrick	
2012	Tom and Jerry: Robin Hood and His Merry Mouse	Prince John	Voice
2012	Pitch Perfect	John Smith	
2013	Rapture-Palooza	Mr. Lewis	
2013	Super Buddies	Drex	Voice
2013	The Best Man Holiday	Stan	
2014	A Million Ways to Die in the West	Dandy #1	
2014	Planes: Fire & Rescue	Cad	Voice
2014	Tell	Huffman	
2014	Breaking the Bank	Richard Grinding	
2015	Pitch Perfect 2	John Smith	
2016	Is That a Gun in Your Pocket?	Mayor Wally	
2016	Sundown	Dad	
2016	Internet Famous	Dave Larson	
2016	Mascots	Upton French	
2016	Almost Christmas	Brooks	
2017	Shimmer Lake	Brad Dawkins	
2017	Pitch Perfect 3	John Smith	
2017	Reality High	Principal Dixon	
2018	Scooby-Doo! & Batman: The Brave and the Bold	Riddler	Voice, direct-to-video
2018	Status Update	Mr. Moody	
2019	Scooby-Doo! Return to Zombie Island	Alan Smithee	Voice, direct-to-video
2021	Licorice Pizza	Jerry Frick	
2022	Rise of the Teenage Mutant Ninja Turtles: The Movie	Warren Stone	Voice
2022	The Curse of Bridge Hollow	Principal Floyd	
2024	Prom Dates	Principal Lundy	
2025	Spinal Tap II: The End Continues	Bob Kitness	

=== Television ===
Year	Title	Role	Notes
1988	Miami Vice	Murray Phillips	Episode: "Hell Hath No Fury"
1991	Mathnet	I. M. Uppwardd	Episode: "The Case of the Poconos Paradise"
1994	The George Carlin Show	Dan Goodwin	Episode: "George Expresses Himself"
1996	Cybill	Chip	Episode: "Cybill Does Diary"
1996	The Late Shift	David Letterman	Television film
1997	Seinfeld	Kurt	Episode: "The Little Jerry"
1997	Weird Science	Timidius	Episode: "I, Chettus"
1997	Party of Five	Glenn	Episode: "S'Wunnerful Life"
1997–1998	Honey, I Shrunk the Kids: The TV Show	Ar'nox	3 episodes
1998	From the Earth to the Moon	Master of Ceremonies	Episode: "The Original Wives Club"
1998	Nothing Sacred	Father Jesse O'Connell	Episode: "HIV Priest! Film at Eleven"
1998	Guys Like Us	Mr. Levin	Episode: "Maestro's First Crush"
1998–1999	Brother's Keeper	Mark	3 episodes
1998–1999	Mad About You	Patrick	2 episodes
2000	Get Real	George Clark	Episode: "Guilt"
2000	Movie Stars	Kurt Mason	Episode: "Who's on First?"
2000–2002	Ally McBeal	Steven Milter	13 episodes
2001	Bette	Alex Berringer	Episode: "Big Business"
2001	Frasier	William	Episode: "It Takes Two to Tangle"
2001	Gideon's Crossing	Dr. Plummer	Episode: "The Mistake"
2002	George Lopez	Charles	Episode: "Guess Who's Coming to Dinner, Honey"
2002–2007, 2018	Harvey Birdman, Attorney at Law	Mentok the Mindtaker, Zardo, Grape Ape, additional voices	Voice, 31 episodes
2003	Monte Walsh	Robert Slocum	Television film
2003–2006	Arrested Development	Wayne Jarvis	5 episodes
2004	Game Over	Sully, additional voices	Voice, 4 episodes
2004	Higglytown Heroes	Tow Truck Driver Hero	Voice, episode: "All Tire'd Out"
2004	Monk	Roddy Lankman	Episode: "Mr. Monk and the Game Show"
2004	Boston Legal	Jerry Austin	2 episodes
2005	Joey	Albert	2 episodes
2006	So Notorious	Phillip Walker	Episode: "Whole"
2006	CSI: Crime Scene Investigation	Anthony Caprice	Episode: "Time of Your Death"
2008–2009	Kath & Kim	Phil Knight	17 episodes
2009	NUMB3RS	Floyd Mayborne	Episode: "Dreamland"
2009	Raising the Bar	Judge Albert Farnsworth	9 episodes
2009–2010	Community	Professor Eustice Whitman	3 episodes
2010	Glee	Russell	Episode: "Dream On"
2010	Glenn Martin, DDS	Various	Voice, episode: "Funshine, USA"
2010	Psych	Clive Prescott	Episode: "Chivalry Is Not Dead... But Someone Is"
2010	Batman: The Brave and the Bold	Riddler	Voice, 2 episodes
2010	Human Target	Richard Applebaum	Episode: "The Other Side of the Mall"
2010–2011	Glory Daze	Brother Jerrod	2 episodes
2011	The Suite Life on Deck	Wilfred Tipton	Episode: "Twister: Part 3"
2011	Man Up!	Higgins	Episode: "Camping"
2011–2013	Happily Divorced	Peter Lovett	34 episodes
2011–2013	The Good Wife	Rodney Jesko	2 episodes
2011–2014	Wilfred	Dr. Cahill	4 episodes
2012	Doc McStuffins	Star Blaster Zero	Voice, episode: "Blast Off!"
2012	Cars Toons	Stanley	Voice, episode: "Time Travel Mater"
2012–2014	Sullivan & Son	Gary Barton	3 episodes
2012–present	Bob's Burgers	Doug Wheeler, additional voices	Voice, 13 episodes
2013	Men at Work	Lindsey Tucker	Episode: "The New Boss"
2013	Good Morning Today	Reverend Jeremiah Phelps	Voice, Episode: "Episode Three"
2013–2014	The Legend of Korra	Varrick, additional voices	Voice, 22 episodes
2014	Mike & Molly	Dr. Gayle Rosen	Episode: "Mind Over Molly"
2014	Terry the Tomboy	Doctor Larry	Television film
2014	Phineas and Ferb	Additional voices	Episode: "Phineas and Ferb: Star Wars"
2014	Franklin & Bash	Dominic	Episode: "Love Is the Drug"
2014	Jessie	Carlisle	Episode: "Between the Swoon and New York City"
2014–2017	Sofia the First	Flambeau	Voice, 3 episodes
2014–2015	Instant Mom	Hoyt Ebnetter	3 episodes
2015	Turbo FAST	Pasadena Paul, Trash Fire Snail	Voice, episode: "Groundhog, Stay!"
2015	Switched at Birth	Larry Shimingo	Episode: "Borrowing Your Enemy's Arrows"
2015	Jesse Stone: Lost in Paradise	Evan	Television film
2015	Adam Ruins Everything	Sommelier	Episode: "Adam Ruins Restaurants"
2016–2018	Angie Tribeca	Dr. Zaius and Randall "Randy" Zaius	3 episodes
2016	The Tom and Jerry Show	Uncle Harry	Voice, episode: "Say Uncle"
2016	2 Broke Girls	Elliot	Episode: "And the Pity Party Bus"
2016–2017	All Hail King Julien	Barty	Voice, 7 episodes
2016	Tween Fest	Todd Crawford	8 episodes
2016	Awkward	Garrett Gibson	Episode: "Happy Campers. Happier Trails"
2017–2018	Great News	Chuck Pierce	23 episodes
2017	Dropping the Soap	Flock Deluge	Episode: "Man Musk"
2017	Niko and the Sword of Light	King Scampi	Voice, 3 episodes
2017	Goldie & Bear	Pops Weasel	Voice, episode: "Pops Goes the Weasel"
2018–2020	Big Hero 6: The Series	Mini-Max, additional voices	Voice, 25 episodes
2018–present	America Says	Himself (host;executive producer starting with season 6 of the show)	540+ episodes Nominated - Daytime Emmy Award for Outstanding Game Show Host (2019)
2018	Drunk History	Wilhelm Von Osten	Episode: "Animals"
2018–2020	F Is for Family	Dr. McCallister	Voice, 2 episodes
2018–2019	Rise of the Teenage Mutant Ninja Turtles	Warren Stone	Voice, 6 episodes
2019	Just Roll with It	General Caleb Barnswallow	Episode: "General Nuisance"
2019	Archibald's Next Big Thing	Tolby	Voice, episode: "The Enchanted Mansion"
2019	Sunnyside	Wallace Furley	Episode: "The Ethiopian Executioner"
2020	Single Parents	Bud Cooper	Episode: "The Angie-Man"
2020–2021	Saved by the Bell	Principal Toddman	Main role
2021	Monsters at Work	Argus	Voice, episode: "The Cover Up"
2022	Celebrity Jeopardy!	Himself (contestant)	2 episodes
2022	Super Pumped	Michael Ovitz	Episode: "Grow or Die"
2022	Tab Time	Burnie	8 episodes
2023	Pretty Freekin Scary	Harold Dubois	Episode: "The Girl Most Likely To Come Back To Life"
2023–2024	Split Second	Himself (host)	Also executive producer
2023–2025	Family Guy	Various voices	Voice, 3 episodes
2023–2024	Baby Shark's Big Show!	Mayor Anchovy	Voice, 15 episodes
2025	RoboGobo	Cappucino	Voice, episode: "Bouncy Ball Baddie/Spray Paint Showdown"
2026	Ghosts	Paul	Episode: "The List"
2026	President Curtis	Warden Ken Jeffries	Voice, Episode: "Triangle"

=== Video games ===
Year	Title	Role	Notes
2004	Halo 2	2401 Penitent Tangent	
2008	Harvey Birdman: Attorney at Law	Mentok the Mindtaker	

=== Theme park attractions ===
Year	Title	Role	Notes
1999	Test Track	Bill McKim	Under GM-sponsored iteration from 1999 to 2012

== Awards and nominations ==
Daytime Emmy Awards

- Nominated for 2019 Outstanding Game Show Host (America Says)

Primetime Emmy Awards

- Nominated for 2017 Outstanding Actor in a Short Form Comedy or Drama Series (for playing Tod Crawford in Tween Fest)

Behind the Voice Actor Awards

- Winner for 2014 best vocal performance in a television series in a supporting role action/drama (for voicing Varrick in The Legend of Korra)
- Winner for 2014 best vocal ensemble in a television series action/drama (The Legend of Korra)

Florida Film Critics Circle Awards

- Winner for 2004 best ensemble cast (A Mighty Wind)

Phoenix Film Critics Society Awards

- Nominated for 2004 best ensemble acting (A Mighty Wind)

Gotham Awards

- Nominated for 2006 best ensemble performance (For Your Consideration)

Online Film and Television Association

- Nominated for best guest actor in a comedy series (Arrested Development)
