= Craig Alpert =

American film editor (born 1973)

- Born: 1973 (age 52–53); Pasadena, California
- Occupation: Film editor
- Years active: 2006–present
- Known for: Deadpool 2 (2018); Borat Subsequent Moviefilm (2020)

Craig Alpert (born 1973) is an American film editor who has edited two dozen films since 2006. He and fellow editors were nominated for the American Cinema Editors Award for Best Edited Feature Film – Comedy for Deadpool 2 (2018) and Borat Subsequent Moviefilm (2020). In his career, Alpert has often edited comedy films.

== Background ==
Alpert was born in 1973 in Pasadena, California and grew up in Irvine, California. He went to school at the Academy of Art University in San Francisco. He also had internships in Industrial Light & Magic's editorial department and in Miramax's postproduction department. His first editing job, while still in college, was working as an assistant editor for the film Toy Story 2 (1999). He later worked as additional editor for the films Meet the Fockers (2004) and The 40-Year-Old Virgin (2005). His first films as editor were Borat (2006) and Knocked Up (2007).

He edited predominantly comedy films for nearly a decade. For Pitch Perfect 2 (2015), he applied his comedy experience but had to learn to edit for musical, particularly a cappella, performances.

For director James Gunn, he was an additional editor for the film The Suicide Squad (2021), and he later worked with Gunn on Superman (2025), collaborating with editor William Hoy.

== Filmography ==
Alpert's editing credits for film
Year	Title	Notes	Ref.
2006	Borat	Edited with Peter Teschner and James Thomas	
2007	Knocked Up	Edited with Brent White	
2008	Pineapple Express		
2008	Yes Man		
2009	Funny People	Edited with Brent White	
2011	The Sitter		
2011	Your Highness		
2012	The Campaign	Edited with Jon Poll	
2014	Ride Along		
2015	Pitch Perfect 2		
2015	Freaks of Nature		
2016	The Boss		
2016	Popstar: Never Stop Never Stopping	Edited with Jamie Gross and Stacey Schroeder	
2017	Rough Night		
2017	Pitch Perfect 3	Edited with Colin Patton	
2018	Deadpool 2	Edited with Dirk Westervelt and Elísabet Ronaldsdóttir	
2020	Dolittle	Edited with Chris Lebenzon	
2020	Borat Subsequent Moviefilm	Edited with James Thomas and Michael Giambra	
2022	The Lost City		
2022	The Man from Toronto		
2023	Blue Beetle		
2025	Superman	Edited with William Hoy	
2025	The Pickup		
2025	Anaconda	Edited with Gregory Plotkin	

== Accolades ==
Alpert's accolades
Year	Film	Editor(s)	Award	Ceremony	Result	Ref.
2018	Deadpool 2	Alpert, Elísabet Ronaldsdóttir, Dirk Westervelt	American Cinema Editors Award for Best Edited Feature Film – Comedy	February 1, 2019	Nominated	
2020	Borat Subsequent Moviefilm	Alpert, James Thomas, Michael Giambra	American Cinema Editors Award for Best Edited Feature Film – Comedy	April 17, 2021	Nominated	
