= Pitch Perfect =

2012 film by Jason Moore

- Theatrical release poster
- Directed by: Jason Moore
- Screenplay by: Kay Cannon
- Based on: Pitch Perfect: The Quest for Collegiate a Cappella Glory by Mickey Rapkin
- Produced by: Paul Brooks; Max Handelman; Elizabeth Banks
- Starring: Anna Kendrick; Skylar Astin; Rebel Wilson; Adam DeVine; Anna Camp; Brittany Snow; John Michael Higgins; Elizabeth Banks
- Cinematography: Julio Macat
- Edited by: Lisa Zeno Churgin
- Music by: Christophe Beck; Mark Kilian
- Production companies: Universal Pictures; Gold Circle Films; Brownstone Productions
- Distributed by: Universal Pictures
- Release dates: September 24, 2012 (Cinerama Dome); October 5, 2012 (United States)
- Running time: 112 minutes
- Country: United States
- Language: English
- Budget: $17 million
- Box office: $115.4 million

Pitch Perfect is a 2012 American musical comedy film directed by Jason Moore and written by Kay Cannon. It features an ensemble cast, including Anna Kendrick, Skylar Astin, Rebel Wilson, Adam DeVine, Anna Camp, Brittany Snow, Hana Mae Lee, Alexis Knapp, Ester Dean, Kelley Jakle, Shelley Regner, Wanetah Walmsley, Ben Platt, Utkarsh Ambudkar, John Michael Higgins, and Elizabeth Banks. The film's plot follows an all-female a cappella group that competes against an all-male group from their own university to win the International Collegiate A Cappella Championship. The film is loosely based on Mickey Rapkin's non-fiction book Pitch Perfect: The Quest for Collegiate a Cappella Glory, and Moore's own experiences while attending Northwestern University.

Pitch Perfect premiered at the Cinerama Dome on September 24, 2012, and was released in the United States by Universal Pictures on October 5, 2012. It received generally positive reviews from critics and became a sleeper hit, earning $115.4 million worldwide against a $17 million budget. It was followed by two sequels, Pitch Perfect 2 (2015) and Pitch Perfect 3 (2017).

== Plot ==
Barden University's all-female a cappella group, the Barden Bellas, make history with inaugural appearance at the finals of the International Championship of Collegiate A Cappella (ICCA), being the first all-female a capella group in history to appear there, but it goes terribly; Bellas singer Aubrey Posen projectile vomits as a result of stage fright, while their male counterparts, the Treblemakers, win.

Several months later, Beca Mitchell enrolls at Barden at the insistence of her father, a professor at the University, who demands that she try college before attempting to become a music producer. Much to his chagrin, Beca spends her time making mash-ups of songs and interning at the university radio station, where she befriends fellow freshman Jesse Swanson.

The new leaders of the Bellas, Aubrey and Chloe Beale, begin recruiting new members at club rush. At first, Beca is uninterested, but gets convinced to audition by Chloe after the latter hears her singing "Titanium" while taking a shower. Beca auditions with a rendition of "Cups (When I'm Gone)" (since she did not know the audition song was 16 bars of "Since U Been Gone") and earns a place in the group alongside seven other newcomers, including Fat Amy. Meanwhile, Treblemakers leader Bumper Allen welcomes Jesse onto the team, but rejects Jesse's roommate Benji.

Aubrey conducts an initiation ritual for the new Bellas, making them swear an oath to never become sexually involved with members of the Treblemakers. After two Bellas break the promise, Aubrey kicks them out. During rehearsal, Aubrey insists on performing the same medley repeatedly, while Beca urges the Bellas to be more creative and daring.

After the Bellas perform poorly during a gig at a fraternity, Chloe admits to the group that she has vocal nodes. At the radio station, Beca gives several of her mixes to the station manager, but he declines to play any of them. However, Jesse listens to Beca's mixes and praises her talent and they become friends.

The Bellas face off against other a cappella groups in a competitive "riff-off". They lose to the Treblemakers on a technicality, but they soon participate in the ICCA Regionals. Despite the Bellas' bland, rehashed medley, they place second thanks to an exciting solo by Fat Amy. After the competition, Beca and Fat Amy accidentally smash a window, leading to Beca's arrest. Jesse contacts Beca's father to bail her out, which upsets Beca.

During the ICCA semi-finals, Beca inserts an impromptu layering of "Bulletproof" into the group's rendition of "The Sign" to win over the bored audience. Although the improvisation impresses the judges, Aubrey angrily scolds Beca for not adhering to their planned medley. She also accuses Beca of hooking up with Jesse, which Jesse denies. Beca responds by snapping at them both and quitting the Bellas. Meanwhile, Benji discovers that the lead singer of the runner-up group the Footnotes is still in high school, which leads to the Footnotes being disqualified and the Bellas being invited to the finals.

During spring break, Chloe unsuccessfully attempts to bring Beca back to the Bellas. Beca's father encourages her to rejoin the group, stating that they need her as much as she needs them. Beca also tries to apologize to Jesse but he rejects her claiming she pushes away those who care for her. During a Bellas rehearsal, various members stand up to Aubrey, who has been exerting tight control over the group. Beca arrives as the Bellas are fighting, and apologizes for spontaneously changing the set. Aubrey agrees to let Beca rejoin the group, and gives her a leadership role. Meanwhile, Bumper leaves the Treblemakers after being offered a job as a back-up singer for John Mayer. With the Treblemakers short one singer, Jesse invites Benji to join the group.

At the ICCA finals, the Bellas win the championship with a mashup arranged by Beca, which includes the songs "Price Tag", "Don't You (Forget About Me)", "Just the Way You Are", "Give Me Everything" and "Party in the U.S.A.". Afterwards, Beca and Jesse kiss. The movie ends with the Bellas holding auditions as the ICCA champions.

== Cast ==
- Anna Kendrick as Beca Mitchell, an introverted and rebellious mash-up producer who joins the Barden Bellas after persuasion from Chloe.
- Skylar Astin as Jesse Swanson, an outgoing Barden freshman who hopes to become a film score composer.
- Rebel Wilson as Patricia "Fat Amy" Hobart, a confident, comical singer from Tasmania.
- Adam DeVine as Bumper Allen, the egotistical leader of the Barden Treblemakers.
- Anna Camp as Aubrey Posen, the uptight and traditionalist co-leader of the Bellas.
- Brittany Snow as Chloe Beale, the friendlier and more civil co-leader of the Bellas.
- Alexis Knapp as Stacie Conrad, a singer and dancer with a high sex drive.
- Ester Dean as Cynthia Rose Adams, a tough, forthright soul singer and rapper.
- Hana Mae Lee as Lilly Onakuramara, an eccentric, soft-spoken, and talented beatboxer.
- Ben Platt as Benji Applebaum, Jesse's roommate, a skilled illusionist who wishes to become a Treblemaker.
- Utkarsh Ambudkar as Donald, Bumper's right-hand man, a vocalist, beatboxer, and rapper.
- Michael Viruet as Unicycle, a beatboxer.
- John Michael Higgins as John Smith, a commentator for the ICCAs.
- Elizabeth Banks as Gail Abernathy-McKadden, a commentator for the ICCAs.

Additionally, Kelley Alice Jakle, Wanetah Walmsley, Shelley Regner, Caroline Fourmy, and Nicole Lovince respectively appear as Barden Bellas Jessica, a bubbly and absent-minded soprano, Denise, an unobtrusive alto, Ashley, an alto and beatboxer, and short-lived Bellas Mary-Elise and Kori. David Del Rio appears as Kolio, and Steven Bailey, Michael Anaya, Greg Gorenc, Brian Silver, and Wesley Lagarde appear as five unnamed members of the Treblemakers. John Benjamin Hickey appears as Dr. Mitchell, Beca's father, a professor at Barden University; Freddie Stroma appears as Luke, Barden's radio station manager who plays Beca's DJ mixes on the air; Jinhee Joung appears as Kimmy Jin, Beca's Korean American roommate; and Christopher Mintz-Plasse and Jacob Wysocki appear as Barden students Tommy and Justin, who organize the school's a cappella auditions. Kether Donohue appears as outgoing Bellas leader Alice. Joe Lo Truglio, Har Mar Superstar, Jason Jones and Donald Faison appear as the Tonehangers, an older, long-graduated a cappella group that gets into a fight with the Bellas and Treblemakers.

== Production ==
The film is based on Mickey Rapkin's 2008 period piece non-fiction book Pitch Perfect: The Quest for Collegiate a Cappella Glory. Rapkin, senior editor at GQ magazine, spent a season covering competitive collegiate a cappella. He followed the Tufts University Beelzebubs (the partial inspiration for the Treblemakers, along with the Boston University Dear Abbeys), the University of Oregon Divisi (the loose inspiration for the Bellas), and the University of Virginia Hullabahoos, who have a cameo in the film. Rapkin's book mainly covers the singing, groupies, partying and rivalries. Two members of the a cappella community, Deke Sharon, who founded the International Championship of College A Cappella, and Ed Boyer, both in Rapkin's book, were brought on board to arrange songs, produce vocals and act as on-site music directors, where they ran a month-long "a cappella boot camp". The film was shot throughout campus and inside buildings at Louisiana State University in Baton Rouge, Louisiana. Elizabeth Banks is a co-producer and a co-star in the film. Filming concluded in December 2011, in Rogers, Arkansas.

=== Casting ===
The casting department included Justin Coulter, Rich Delia, Allison Estrin, and Michael Roth. Producer Elizabeth Banks appears throughout the film alongside John Michael Higgins as commentators for the competitions.

Paul Brooks stated "First and foremost, we were looking for actors who had comedic instincts and thought we'd get lucky with terrific actors who happened to be funny and can actually dance and maybe sing. It turns out we did get lucky with our cast!" According to producer Elizabeth Banks, "The character Beca required someone who was grounded, who has a strong point of view on the world, who is funny and empathetic and someone who we can all relate to and root for." Of Kendrick, she said, "Anna is all those things, and there was no other choice." Fellow producer Brooks said "I saw Anna in Up in the Air and thought it was the most exquisite, elegant, balanced, sublime performance. Anna was our first choice for the role of Beca."

When casting the character of Jesse, Max Handelman said "We were looking for a young John Cusack-type guy. We needed to find someone who was kind of awkward but not a geek, but not so cool that you're not rooting for him." Skylar Astin was chosen for the role. Of Astin's audition, Banks said the chemistry between Skylar and Anna when they read together prior to shooting was "clear and they were able to riff off each other."

Rebel Wilson was recognized for her performance in the comedy film Bridesmaids upon auditioning for the role of Fat Amy, which she won instantly. Moore recalled Wilson singing Lady Gaga's "The Edge of Glory" while beating "on her chest with her fists." He said, "I didn't even hear the end of the song because I was laughing so hard. There's this beautiful openness to the way Rebel approaches everything, and that's what works great for the character. She's fearless." Adam DeVine was personally chosen by Banks and Handelman for the role of Bumper after they saw him on the television series Workaholics. Banks confessed that she and her husband are "big Workaholics fans," and after watching one night during the film's casting, they saw DeVine and "immediately thought" he would be a good choice for Bumper. He initially declined because he was not a singer. DeVine eventually surprised Banks and Handelman with his vocal skills. Anna Camp was chosen for the role of Aubrey. Producer Max Handelman said, "Elizabeth and I were huge fans of Anna's from True Blood. Aubrey is set up as the antagonist for Beca, and Beca's already a bit hard-edged, so it was so important to find an actress who could play Aubrey as someone who could marshal the crazy but also was sympathetic."

== Release ==
The film was released on October 5, 2012, in the United States. In Australia, it was released on December 6, 2012.

=== Home media ===
Pitch Perfect was released on DVD, Blu-ray, and Blu-ray/DVD combo pack on December 18, 2012. A 4K UHD Blu-Ray release followed on March 20, 2018.

== Reception ==
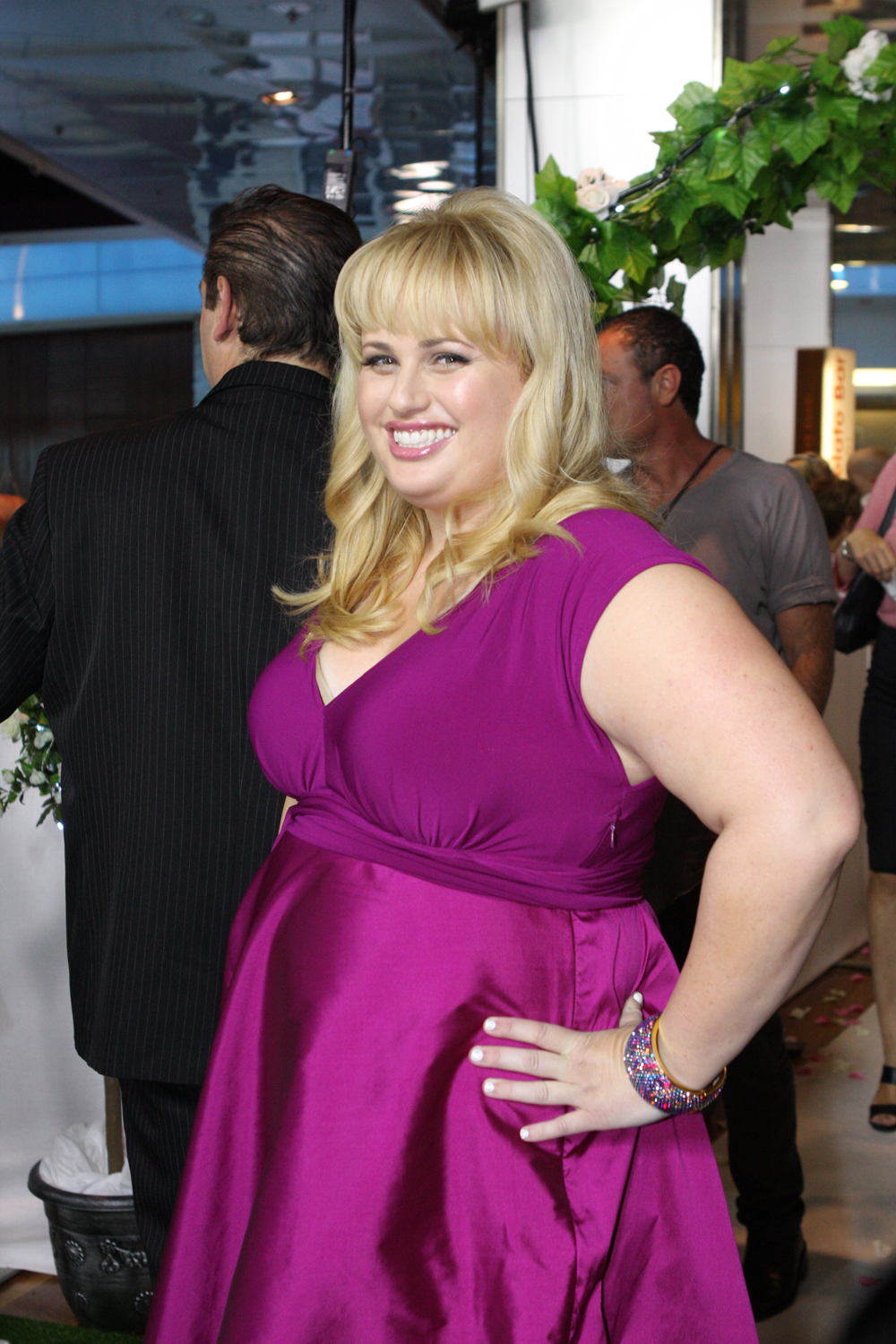
Rebel Wilson was praised for her performance.

=== Box office ===
Pitch Perfect grossed $65 million in North America and $50.3 million in other territories for a total gross of $115.4 million since release, against a $17 million budget.

The film opened in limited release in the United States and Canada on September 28, 2012, and wide release in the United States and Canada on October 5, 2012. It grossed $1.8 million upon its opening day of limited release and $4.9 million on its first day of wide release. In its wide opening weekend, the film opened at number three, behind Taken 2 and Hotel Transylvania, grossing $14.8 million. The opening weekend audience was 81 percent female, which is considered overwhelming. The opening weekend also attracted a younger audience with 55% of the opening weekend audience being under the age of 25. The film is the third-highest-grossing music comedy film, behind its sequel, Pitch Perfect 2, and School of Rock.

=== Critical response ===
On Rotten Tomatoes the film has an approval rating of 81% based on 156 reviews, with an average rating of 6.40/10. The site's critical consensus reads, "Pitch Perfect's plot is formulaic, but the performances are excellent and the musical numbers are toe-tapping as well." On Metacritic it has a weighted average score of 66 out of 100, based on reviews from 33 critics, indicating "generally favorable reviews". Audiences surveyed by CinemaScore gave the film a grade of "A" on an A+ to F scale.

NPR's David Edelstein selected it as one of the top films of the year and Entertainment Weekly chose the soundtrack as one of the year's best. Roger Ebert gave the film 2 stars out of 4, praising Rebel Wilson for her "ebullient, unstoppable and raucous" performance, but also stating that "It's a twentysomething song-and-dance movie built around rival a cappella groups. That's more exciting than dueling string quartets, I suppose— but no, the quartets would be performing better material."

=== Accolades ===
List of awards and nominations for Pitch Perfect
Award	Category	Nominees	Result
Broadcast Film Critics Association Award	Best Actress in a Comedy	Rebel Wilson	Nominated
Detroit Film Critics Society Award	Breakthrough Performance	Rebel Wilson	Nominated
Motion Picture Sound Editors	Best Music in a Musical Feature Film	Pitch Perfect	Won
MTV Movie Award	Best Breakthrough Performance	Rebel Wilson	Won
MTV Movie Award	Best Musical Moment	Anna Kendrick, Rebel Wilson, Anna Camp, Brittany Snow, Alexis Knapp, Ester Dean, and Hana Mae Lee	Won
MTV Movie Award	Best WTF Moment	Anna Camp ("Hack-Appella")	Nominated
MTV Movie Award	Best Female Performance	Rebel Wilson	Nominated
People's Choice Award	Favorite Comedy Movie	Pitch Perfect	Nominated
San Diego Film Critics Society	San Diego Film Critics Society Award for Best Supporting Actress	Rebel Wilson	Nominated
Teen Choice Awards	Choice Movie: Comedy	Pitch Perfect	Won
Teen Choice Awards	Choice Movie Actress: Comedy	Anna Kendrick	Nominated
Teen Choice Awards	Choice Movie Actress: Comedy	Rebel Wilson	Won
Teen Choice Awards	Choice Movie Actor: Comedy	Skylar Astin	Won
Teen Choice Awards	Choice Movie: Scene Stealer	Ben Platt	Nominated
Teen Choice Awards	Choice Movie: Scene Stealer	Hana Mae Lee	Nominated
Teen Choice Awards	Choice Movie: Breakout	Adam DeVine	Nominated
Teen Choice Awards	Choice Movie: Villain	Adam DeVine	Won
American Music Awards	Favorite Soundtrack	Pitch Perfect	Won

== Soundtrack ==
Pitch Perfect: Original Motion Picture Soundtrack was released digitally on September 25, 2012, and physically on October 2, 2012. Three of the songs from the album, including the highly covered "Cups", charted on the Billboard Hot 100. It was 2013's bestselling soundtrack album and has sold 1.2 million copies in the United States as of April 2015.

On September 14, Kira Kazantsev won Miss America 2015 after performing "Happy" with cup percussion, in a manner that was similar to Anna Kendrick's character in Pitch Perfect.

== Sequels ==
=== Pitch Perfect 2 (2015) ===
In December 2012, Skylar Astin revealed that he and Rebel Wilson had meetings with Universal about a potential sequel.

In April 2013, it was confirmed that a sequel would be released in 2015. Elizabeth Banks would direct the sequel with Kay Cannon returning as screenwriter. Brooks would produce for Gold Circle Films with Banks and Max Handelman producing for Brownstone Productions. Kay Cannon would co-produce with Gold Circle's Jeff Levine. Kendrick, Astin, Wilson, Camp, Snow, Platt, DeVine, Dean, Knapp, Jakle, Regner, Walmsley, Banks and Higgins would all reprise their roles in the sequel. Additionally, Hailee Steinfeld and Chrissie Fit would join the cast as Emily and Flo, the new Barden Bellas, while Katey Sagal would join as Katherine Junk, and German YouTube star Flula Borg would appear as Pieter Kramer.

It was announced in January 2014 that the sequel would be released on May 15, 2015. On June 10, 2015, plans for a third film were officially confirmed, with Kay Cannon returning to write the script.

=== Pitch Perfect 3 (2017) ===
On June 10, 2015, a third film was officially confirmed, with Kay Cannon returning to write the script. The film was slated to be released on July 21, 2017, before being pushed back to August 4, 2017, and then moving back to the July 21 slot. Finally it was decided to be released on December 22, 2017. Several days later it was announced both Kendrick and Wilson would reprise their roles, and later Brittany Snow was also confirmed to return. Hailee Steinfeld is also going to reprise her role. On October 18, 2016, Anna Camp was also confirmed to be returning. On January 2, 2017, Ester Dean and Chrissie Fit both confirmed that they were heading to Atlanta to film the third installment, reprising their roles. Banks was going to return to direct, and also as a producer along with Max Handelman and Paul Brooks. Banks later announced that she would be stepping down as director due to scheduling conflicts and parental responsibilities, but would remain a producer. Trish Sie was later brought on as director.

=== Television series ===
In September 2021, Universal Television announced that a television series based on the film had been ordered at Peacock, with Adam DeVine reprising his role as Bumper Allen. It will be written by Megan Amram, who serves as executive producer and showrunner, and Elizabeth Banks is also an executive producer. Other cast includes, Flula Borg, Sarah Hyland, and Jameela Jamil. Filming took place in Berlin.
