= Kay Cannon =

American filmmaker (born 1974)

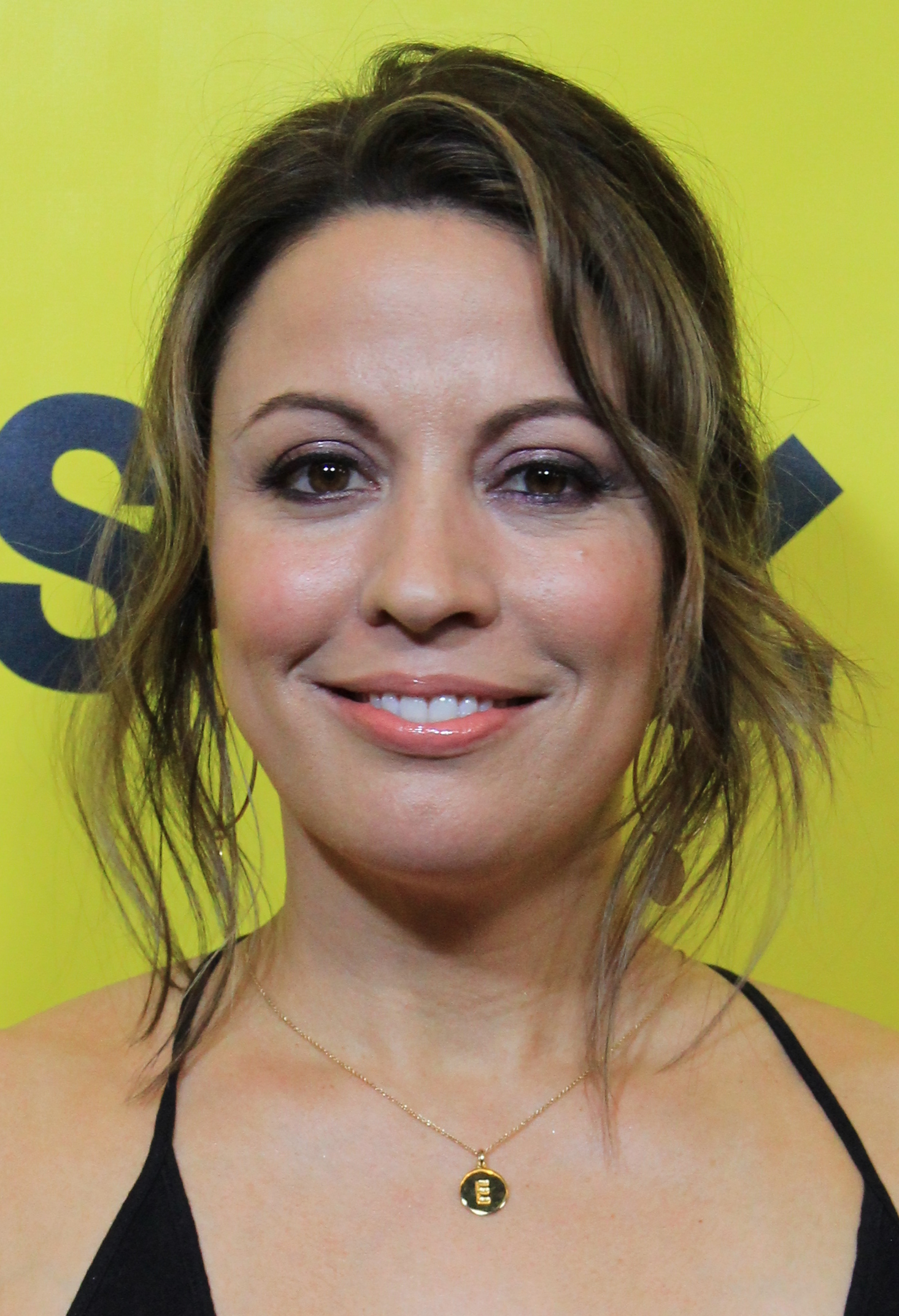
- Cannon in 2018
- Born: August 21, 1974 (age 52); Custer Park, Illinois, U.S.
- Education: Reed-Custer High School; Lewis University (BA; MA)
- Occupations: Screenwriter; producer; director; actress
- Years active: 2007–present
- Spouses: Jason Sudeikis (m. 2004; div. 2010); Eben Russell (m. 2012)
- Children: 1

Kay Cannon (born August 21, 1974) is an American screenwriter, producer, director, and actress. She is best known for writing and producing the Pitch Perfect film series (2012–2017). She made her directorial debut with the comedy film Blockers (2018). Cannon was also a writer and producer for the NBC comedy series 30 Rock (2007–2012) and the FOX comedy series New Girl (2012–2014). She created, wrote and produced the short-lived Netflix comedy-drama series Girlboss (2017).

== Early life ==
Kay Cannon was raised in Custer Park, Illinois, and is the fifth of seven children. She graduated from Reed-Custer High School in Braidwood, Illinois, and received her BA in Theatre and MA in Education at Lewis University in Romeoville, Illinois.

== Career ==
=== Acting ===
Cannon trained at The Second City, ImprovOlympic, and ComedySportz. One of her first jobs was as a performer at ComedySportz.

She has performed sketch and improv for theaters including Boom Chicago in Amsterdam, Netherlands, The Second City in Chicago and Las Vegas, ImprovOlympic (West and Chicago) and at The Upright Citizens Brigade Theatre in Los Angeles and New York City.

Cannon starred in the independent film The Little Tin Man (2013). She has guest-starred on NBC's 30 Rock, New Girl, and Cristela.

She made a cameo in Pitch Perfect 2 (2015) and also appeared in the comedy How to Be Single (2016), starring Rebel Wilson and Dakota Johnson.

=== Writing ===
While performing and writing around Chicago, she met actress Tina Fey, a fellow Second City alumna. When Fey began creating the NBC comedy 30 Rock, she brought Cannon to the writing staff. She worked her way up from staff writer to supervising producer.

Cannon won the Writers Guild of America Award for Best Comedic Series for her work on 30 Rock three times. In 2008, she won a Peabody Award for her work on the show. In 2010, Cannon was nominated for an Emmy Award for Outstanding Writing in a Comedy Series. During this time, Cannon also worked as a co-producer on the feature film, Baby Mama (2008).

She moved from New York City to Los Angeles when she signed an overall development deal with 20th Century Fox. Within that deal, she worked as a co-executive producer on New Girl and as a consulting producer on Cristela. As part of her development, Cannon sold a workplace comedy, The Wrecking Crew, to Fox and wrote the pilot The Runt for CBS.

She then created, executive produced the show Girlboss for Netflix based on the real life of Sophia Amoruso.

Cannon's first produced feature screenplay was the a cappella comedy Pitch Perfect (2012). She wrote and co-produced the film's sequels, Pitch Perfect 2 (2015) and Pitch Perfect 3 (2017).

=== Directing ===
Cannon made her directorial debut with Blockers. The film was released by Universal Pictures on April 6, 2018. On April 9, 2019, it was announced that Cannon would write and direct a musical reimagining of Cinderella for Sony Pictures, starring Camila Cabello and produced by James Corden and his production company, Fullwell 73.

== Personal life ==
In 2004, Cannon married actor and comedian Jason Sudeikis after five years together. They separated in 2008 and divorced in 2010.

Cannon and her second husband, comedy writer Eben Russell, have a daughter born in October 2013.

== Filmography ==
=== Film ===
Year	Title	Director	Writer	Co-producer
2008	Baby Mama	No	No	Yes
2012	Pitch Perfect	No	Yes	No
2015	Pitch Perfect 2	No	Yes	Yes
2017	Pitch Perfect 3	No	Yes	Yes
2018	Blockers	Yes	No	No
2019	Let It Snow	No	Yes	No
2021	Cinderella	Yes	Yes	No
TBA	One Attempt Remaining	Yes	Yes	No

=== Television ===
Year	Title	Writer	Producer	Notes
2007–2012	30 Rock	Yes	Co-producer	11 episodes
2012–2014	New Girl	Yes	Co-executive	4 episodes
2014	Cristela	Yes	Consulting	2 episodes
2017	Girlboss	Yes	Executive	6 episodes, Also creator

== See also ==
- List of female film and television directors
- List of LGBT-related films directed by women
