= Jason Moore (director) =

American film director (born 1970)

- Born: October 22, 1970 (age 55); Fayetteville, Arkansas, U.S.
- Occupations: Film director, television director, theatre director
- Years active: 2003–present

Jason Moore (born October 22, 1970) is an American director of film, stage, and television.

== Life and career ==
Jason Moore was born in Fayetteville, Arkansas, and studied at Northwestern University. Moore's Broadway career began as a resident director of Les Misérables at the Imperial Theatre during its original run. He is the son of Fayetteville District Judge Rudy Moore.

In March 2003, Moore directed the musical Avenue Q, which opened Off-Broadway at the Vineyard Theatre and then moved to Broadway at the John Golden Theatre in July 2003. He was nominated for a 2004 Tony Award for his direction. Moore also directed productions of the musical in Las Vegas and London and the show's national tour. Moore directed the 2005 Broadway revival of Steel Magnolias and Shrek the Musical, starring Brian d'Arcy James and Sutton Foster which opened on Broadway in 2008. He directed the concert of Jerry Springer — The Opera at Carnegie Hall in January 2008.

Moore, Jeff Whitty, Jake Shears, and John "JJ" Garden worked together on a new musical based on Armistead Maupin's Tales of the City. The musical premiered at the American Conservatory Theater, San Francisco, California in May 2011 and ran through July 2011.

For television, Moore has directed episodes of Dawson's Creek, One Tree Hill, Everwood, and Brothers & Sisters. As a writer, Moore adapted the play The Floatplane Notebooks with Paul Fitzgerald from the novel by Clyde Edgerton. A staged reading of the play was presented at the New Play Festival at the Charlotte, North Carolina Repertory Theatre in 1996, with a fully staged production in 1998.

In 2012, Moore made his film directorial debut with Pitch Perfect, starring Anna Kendrick and Brittany Snow. He also served as an executive producer on the sequel. He directed the film Sisters, starring Tina Fey and Amy Poehler, which was released on December 18, 2015.

== Filmography ==
=== Film ===
- Pitch Perfect (2012)
- Sisters (2015)
- Shotgun Wedding (2022)

=== Television ===
Year	Title	Episode(s)
2001-2002	Dawson's Creek	"Promicide"
2001-2002	Dawson's Creek	"High Anxiety"
2001-2002	Dawson's Creek	"Ego Tripping at the Gates of Hell"
2002-2004	Everwood	"We Hold These Truths"
2002-2004	Everwood	"Unhappy Holidays"
2002-2004	Everwood	"Best Laid Plans"
2003	One Tree Hill	"Every Night Is Another Story"
2007	Brothers & Sisters	"Bad News"
2013-2014	Trophy Wife	"Pilot"
2013-2014	Trophy Wife	"The Social Network"
2013-2014	Trophy Wife	"The Wedding - Part One"
2026	Elle	"Pilot"
2026	Elle	"No Silly, I Go Here"

=== Soundtrack writer ===
- Pitch Perfect 2 (2015) (Also executive producer)
- The Voice (2015) (1 episode)
