= Gold Circle Films =

Independent film company

- Type: Private
- Founded: 2000; 26 years ago
- Founder: Norman Waitt Jr.
- Headquarters: United States
- Products: Film
- Parent: Gold Circle Entertainment

Gold Circle Films is an American independent film production company, mainly focusing on horror, comedy, and romance films founded in 2000 by former co-founder of Gateway Computer, Norman Waitt Jr. Titles released by Gold Circle include White Noise, My Big Fat Greek Wedding, Slither, The Wedding Date, The Man from Elysian Fields, and the Pitch Perfect series.

== History ==
Gold Circle Films was a subsidiary of Gold Circle Entertainment, which was founded in 1996 by Norman Waitt Jr., one of the co-founders of Gateway, Inc. The original company was launched as an umbrella organization where Gold Circle would help market and distribute music releases for record labels. Waitt launched the film division in May 2000.

Gold Circle distributed most of their films internationally through Senator International.

Gold Circle was turned down, as well as DreamWorks Pictures, in an offer to produce Twisted's indie film, Saw, as Lionsgate would end up purchasing the rights and made it a huge success, spawning a franchise of films. In 2004, the company struck a first-look deal at Universal Pictures to distrubte the company's properties, as well as a second-look deal with Paramount Pictures. The company in 2005 had a first-look deal with .40 Caliber Films.

In 2011, Blumhouse (studio behind franchises such as Paranormal Activity, Sinister, The Purge, Unfriended, and Happy Death Day) joined forces with Gold Circle to create Angle Films. In 2011, the company reupped its deal with Universal Pictures, to distribute six films between 2012 and 2014, as well as content by Angle Films.

== Films ==
- Double Whammy (2001)
- The Man from Elysian Fields (2001)
- Strange Hearts (Roads to Riches) (2001)
- Tempted (2001)
- 13 Moons (2002)
- The Badge (2002)
- Soul Survivors (2002)
- Dawg (Bad Boy) (2002)
- My Big Fat Greek Wedding (2002)
- Poolhall Junkies (2002)
- Sonny (2002)
- Wishcraft (2002)
- Dysfunktional Family (2003)
- Rolling Kansas (2003)
- Jiminy Glick in Lalawood (2004)
- The Long Weekend (2005)
- The Wedding Date (2005)
- White Noise (2005)
- Griffin & Phoenix (2006)
- Slither (2006)
- Because I Said So (2007)
- Whisper (2007)
- White Noise 2: The Light (2007)
- Over Her Dead Body (2008)
- My Sassy Girl (2008)
- New in Town (2009)
- The Haunting in Connecticut (2009)
- Blood Creek (2009)
- The Fourth Kind (2009)
- The New Daughter (2009)
- In the Land of the Free... (2010)
- Life as We Know It (2010)
- ATM (2012)
- Pitch Perfect (2012)
- The Haunting in Connecticut 2 (2013)
- The Possession of Michael King (2014)
- Search Party (2014)
- Pitch Perfect 2 (2015)
- My Big Fat Greek Wedding 2 (2016)
- Cruel and Unusual (2017)
- Pitch Perfect 3 (2017)
- I Still See You (2018)
- Prey for the Devil (2022)
- Champions (2023)
- My Big Fat Greek Wedding 3 (2023)

== Television ==
- Pitch Perfect: Bumper in Berlin (2022)
