= Paul Brooks =

British-born film producer

- Born: London, England
- Education: University of London
- Occupation: film producer
- Years active: 1992–present

Paul Brooks is a British-born film producer.

Brooks has a Humanities degree in English/Philosophy/Psychology and Sociology from the University of London. He then went into real estate development before moving into film.

In 1992 he executive produced low-budget film for Vadim Jean & Gary Sinyor "Leon The Pig Farmer" which became an unexpected hit in the UK box office.

In 1993 he formed a film company Metrodome Films which made films likes the controversial film Beyond Bedlam, Proteus, the cult horror Darklands directed by Julian Richards and Killing Time. Most of these films were usually starred Craig Fairbrass. In 2016 the company has been placed into administration.

Brooks has been the president of Gold Circle Films since March 2001. He has produced a number of films, including the Academy Award-nominated Shadow of the Vampire and My Big Fat Greek Wedding.

== Filmography ==
- Leon the Pig Farmer (1993) (executive producer)
- Beyond Bedlam (1993)
- Clockwork Mice (1995)
- Solitaire for 2 (1995) (co-executive producer)
- Proteus (1995)
- Darklands (1996)
- The Real Howard Spitz (1998)
- Killing Time (1998) (executive producer)
- One More Kiss (1999)
- Shadow of the Vampire (2000) (executive producer)
- The Man from Elysian Fields (2001) (executive producer)
- The Badge (2002) (executive producer)
- Sonny (2002)
- Poolhall Junkies (2002) (executive producer)
- My Big Fat Greek Wedding (2002) (executive producer)
- 13 Moons (2002) (executive producer)
- Rolling Kansas (2003)
- DysFunktional Family (2003)
- Jiminy Glick in Lalawood (2004)
- The Long Weekend (2005)
- White Noise (2005)
- The Wedding Date (2005)
- Griffin & Phoenix (2006)
- Slither (2006)
- Whisper (2007)
- Because I Said So (2007)
- White Noise 2: The Light (2007) (executive producer)
- Rock Paper Scissors (2008)
- The Haunting in Connecticut (2008)
- Blood Creek (2008)
- My Sassy Girl (2008)
- Over Her Dead Body (2008)
- The New Daughter (2009)
- The Fourth Kind (2009)
- New in Town (2009)
- The Belcoo Experiment (2009)
- ATM (2010)
- Pitch Perfect (2012)
- Search Party (2014)
- Pitch Perfect 2 (2015)
- I Still See You (2018)
- Prey for the Devil (2022)
- Champions (2023)
- Last Breath (2025)
