= Pitch Perfect 2 =

2015 film by Elizabeth Banks

- Theatrical release poster
- Directed by: Elizabeth Banks
- Written by: Kay Cannon
- Based on: Characters by Mickey Rapkin
- Produced by: Paul Brooks; Max Handelman; Elizabeth Banks
- Starring: Anna Kendrick; Rebel Wilson; Hailee Steinfeld; Brittany Snow; Skylar Astin; Adam DeVine; Katey Sagal; Anna Camp; Ben Platt; Alexis Knapp; Hana Mae Lee; Ester Dean; Chrissie Fit; John Michael Higgins; Elizabeth Banks
- Cinematography: Jim Denault
- Edited by: Craig Alpert
- Music by: Mark Mothersbaugh
- Production companies: Gold Circle Films; Brownstone Productions
- Distributed by: Universal Pictures
- Release dates: April 20, 2015 (Las Vegas); May 15, 2015 (United States)
- Running time: 115 minutes
- Country: United States
- Language: English
- Budget: $29–31 million
- Box office: $287.5 million

Pitch Perfect 2 is a 2015 American musical comedy film directed and produced by Elizabeth Banks and written by Kay Cannon. It is a sequel to the 2012 film Pitch Perfect, and it is Banks's directorial debut. The film follows the Barden University Bellas, an all-female a cappella group, who face off against a German group, Das Sound Machine, in a world a cappella championship. The film's ensemble cast features Anna Kendrick, Rebel Wilson, Brittany Snow, Skylar Astin, Adam DeVine, Anna Camp, Ben Platt, Hana Mae Lee, Alexis Knapp, Ester Dean, Kelley Jakle, Shelley Regner, John Michael Higgins, and Elizabeth Banks—all reprising their roles from the previous film—as well as Hailee Steinfeld, Katey Sagal, Birgitte Hjort Sørensen, and Flula Borg.

Pitch Perfect 2 was released in the United States on May 15, 2015, by Universal Pictures. It grossed $287.5 million worldwide, surpassing the total gross of the original film ($115.4 million) in five days. It became the highest-grossing musical comedy film of all time, overtaking School of Rock ($131.3 million). A sequel, Pitch Perfect 3, was released on December 22, 2017.

== Plot ==
In 2015, The Barden Bellas have been the ICCA National champions for three consecutive years and are now led by senior Beca Mitchell and three-time super senior Chloe Beale.

A national scandal (dubbed "Muffgate") erupts when Patricia "Fat Amy" Hobart accidentally rips her pants in front of U.S. President Barack Obama during his birthday performance at the Kennedy Center, exposing her genitalia and leading to the Bellas' suspension from the ICCAs despite Beca saying that it was all an accident. The scandal becomes highly scrutinized by the media.

Beca makes a deal that they can be reinstated should they win the A Cappella World Championship. Freshman Emily Junk hopes to follow in the footsteps of her mother, Katherine, by becoming a Bella. She watches an a cappella performance by the Treblemakers, now led by Beca's boyfriend Jesse Swanson. Jesse's friend Benjamin "Benji" Applebaum, develops a crush on Emily.

The Bellas learn that German powerhouse group Das Sound Machine (DSM) has replaced them on their victory tour and is favorite to win the Worlds. Beca has secretly started an internship at recording studio Residual Heat, which only Jesse knows (and Fat Amy later discovers).

As the Bellas' suspension means they cannot hold auditions, Emily goes directly to their sorority house and sings her unfinished song "Flashlight". They decide she can join; since she came of her own accord, they technically aren't breaking any rules.

The Bellas meet DSM when the latter performs at a car show. DSM leaders Pieter Krämer and Kommissar mock the Bellas. Both groups are invited to a riff-off with the Treblemakers, the Tone Hangers (composed of former Treblemakers, including previous leader Bumper Allen, with whom Amy is in a casual relationship), and the Green Bay Packers.

The Bellas make it to the final two, but lose to DSM when Emily sings "Flashlight", violating the rule of no original songs. Bumper asks Amy on a traditional date and to officially be his girlfriend; she refuses. At a practice performance for the Worlds, the Bellas' set ends in disaster when their pyrotechnics set fire to Cynthia Rose's hair.

Chloe takes The Bellas on a retreat to rediscover their roots and synchronicity, led by former Bella Aubrey Posen. Beca's internship is revealed, and Beca argues with Chloe over her obsession with the group and accuses the other Bellas of not thinking about their futures. She storms off, only to step into one of the camp's bear traps.

Beca apologizes before being saved by Lilly. The Bellas accept that they will go their separate ways after graduation, and regain harmony by singing "Cups", Beca's audition song for the group.

Amy regrets ending things with Bumper and they reconcile. Beca's boss has been unimpressed with her, so Beca offers to help Emily produce "Flashlight". He likes the result and says he looks forward to working with them.

The senior Bellas graduate and the group heads to Copenhagen for the World Finals. Emily and Benji share a kiss. The Bellas deliver a stripped-down performance ending in a harmonized version of "Flashlight" with Aubrey, Katherine, and other past Bellas joining in. They win. As the senior Bellas leave Barden, they give Emily a belated initiation ceremony, with Amy demonstrating the last tradition: christening the house by sliding down the staircase.

== Cast ==
- Anna Kendrick as Beca Mitchell, the leader of the Bellas, known for creating their unique modern-day sound. She is an aspiring record producer and has an internship at record label Residual Heat.
- Rebel Wilson as Patricia "Fat Amy" Hobart, a confident senior Bella who describes herself as "the best singer in Tasmania with teeth."
- Hailee Steinfeld as Emily Junk, a freshman legacy Bella who is an aspiring songwriter, and Benji's love interest. Her mother Katherine was also a Barden Bella.
- Brittany Snow as Chloe Beale, a three-time super senior and the enthusiastic co-leader of the Bellas. She has deliberately failed her college diploma three times to remain in the group.
- Skylar Astin as Jesse Swanson, the leader of the Treblemakers and Beca's boyfriend.
- Adam DeVine as Bumper Allen, Fat Amy's love interest, former leader of the Treblemakers and current member of the Tone Hangers. After working for John Mayer, he returns to Barden as a security guard.
- Katey Sagal as Katherine Junk, Emily's mother and a former Bella.
- Anna Camp as Aubrey Posen, former leader of the Bellas, now runs the Lodge at Fallen Leaves.
- Alexis Knapp as Stacie Conrad, a senior Bella known for being overly sexual.
- Hana Mae Lee as Lilly Onakuramara, a senior Bella known for her quiet speaking voice, odd remarks, and beat-boxing.
- Ben Platt as Benji Applebaum, a senior Treblemaker, Jesse's best friend and Emily's love interest.
- Ester Dean as Cynthia Rose Adams, a tough senior Bella known for her strong urban vocal skills.
- Chrissie Fit as Florencia "Flo" Fuentes, a senior Bella who joined the group as a sophomore after coming to Barden from Guatemala.
- Birgitte Hjort Sørensen as Kommissar, Das Sound Machine's leader.
- Flula Borg as Pieter Krämer, Das Sound Machine's "second-in-command"
- Kelley Jakle as Jessica, a senior Bella.
- Shelley Regner as Ashley, a senior Bella.
- Reggie Watts, John Hodgman, Jason Jones, and Joe Lo Truglio as Tone Hanger singers
- John Michael Higgins as John Smith, an a cappella competition commentator.
- Elizabeth Banks as Gail Abernathy-McKadden-Feinberger, an a cappella competition commentator.

Additionally, Keegan-Michael Key appears as Sammy, Beca's boss at Residual Heat, a rude but successful producer, Shawn Carter Peterson appears as Dax, an intern at Residual Heat, David Cross (credited as Sir Willups Brightlysmore) appears as the Riff-Off host, former Vanderbilt Melodores member Ted Moock appear as the Treblemaker's baritone, Pentatonix members Scott Hoying, Kirstin Maldonado, Mitch Grassi, Avi Kaplan, and Kevin Olusola appear as Team Canada, former Dartmouth Aires member Michael Odokara-Okigbo appear as Team Nigeria, Penn Masala appears as Team India, the Naan Stops, and Filharmonic appears as Team Philippines.

=== Cameos ===
Green Bay Packers players Clay Matthews, David Bakhtiari, Don Barclay, Josh Sitton, and T. J. Lang, as well as Jordan Rodgers (the brother of Packers quarterback Aaron Rodgers) make cameos as themselves. Also appearing as themselves are Snoop Dogg, Natalie Morales, Jake Tapper, Joe Scarborough, Mika Brzezinski, Jimmy Kimmel, Rosie O'Donnell, Rosie Perez, Lucas Grabeel, Nicolle Wallace, Christina Aguilera, Adam Levine, Blake Shelton, and Pharrell Williams. Robin Roberts, C.J. Perry, and Kether Donohue appear as Legacy Bellas during the finale. Additionally, President Barack Obama, First Lady Michelle Obama, and Shonda Rhimes briefly appear via archive footage.

== Production ==
In December 2012, Skylar Astin revealed that he and Rebel Wilson had meetings with Universal Studios about the potential sequel. In April 2013, it was confirmed that a sequel would be released in 2015. Elizabeth Banks directed the sequel, and Kay Cannon returned as screenwriter. Paul Brooks produced for Gold Circle Films with Banks and Max Handelman producing for Brownstone Productions. Deke Sharon returned as vocal producer, and has a brief cameo as a German reporter. As in the first movie, they ran a month of "a cappella boot camp" before filming.

=== Casting ===
Anna Kendrick and Wilson returned to the cast early in 2014 to play the characters they originated in the first film. Brittany Snow reprised her character. On April 24, Chrissie Fit was added to the cast. On May 1, Hailee Steinfeld was added to the cast, playing a new member of the Barden Bellas. On May 5, Adam DeVine was reported to return in the film. On May 14, Katey Sagal was added to the cast, playing Steinfeld's character's mother. On May 29, Flula Borg was added to the cast, playing the leader of Das Sound Machine. It was confirmed on June 18, 2014, that Christopher Shepard was added to the cast. It was confirmed on June 19, 2014, that Pentatonix would play the role of a rival group to the Barden Bellas. It was later confirmed that The Filharmonic from season 4 of The Sing Off would make a cameo appearance as a rival group from the Philippines. On August 24, 2014, it was announced that Penn Masala, the all-male Hindi a cappella group from director Elizabeth Banks' and producer Max Handelman's alma mater The University of Pennsylvania, would be featured as a team from South Asia. On June 25, Birgitte Hjort Sørensen was added to the cast.

==== Green Bay Packers cameos ====
The Green Bay Packers players were cast after David Bakhtiari reached out to Banks on Twitter. He conveyed how much his teammates enjoyed the first Pitch Perfect and told her they would be willing to do almost anything for a part in the movie. Bakhtiari served as the players representative during the casting period, working to confirm which players would appear and what role they would play. The players were eventually cast as a competing acapella group, a larger role than they were expected. In the scene, the players are part of an acapella group called "The Green Bay Packers" and sing "Bootylicious" by Beyoncé. They performed their own choreography and recorded their actual vocals, ultimately landing on the movie's album. The players part in the movie was not made public until the trailer was released in November 2014, with the players inclusion drawing significant interest in the news. Their inclusion and performance was praised by multiple movie critics.

=== Filming ===
On May 21, 2014, principal photography began at Louisiana State University (LSU) campus in Baton Rouge.

== Music ==
On December 3, 2014, Mark Mothersbaugh was hired to compose the music for the film. The official soundtrack was released on May 12, 2015. The special edition soundtrack was later released on August 8, 2015.

The original album debuted at number one on the Billboard 200, earning 107,000 album-equivalent units (92,000 copies of traditional sales) in the week ending May 17, 2015.

== Release ==
The film was released on May 7, 2015, in Australia and New Zealand, and May 15 in the United States and Canada.

=== Marketing ===
A still from the rehearsals for the film was revealed on May 16, 2014. The poster was released on November 18, 2014, and the trailer came out the following day. A second trailer was aired during Super Bowl XLIX on February 1, 2015.

=== Home media ===
Director Elizabeth Banks stated an additional performance by the Treblemakers was filmed specifically for the DVD release. Also included on the DVD will be deleted scenes. On May 20, 2015, it was announced that FX Networks had acquired U.S. television broadcasting rights to the film.

The Blu-ray and DVD editions of Pitch Perfect 2 were released on September 22, 2015, in the U.S., with a Target-exclusive edition containing additional bonus features being released the same day. Pitch Perfect 2 was released on 4K UHD Blu-Ray on March 20, 2018.

== Reception ==
=== Box office ===
Pitch Perfect 2 grossed $184.2 million in the United States and Canada, and $103.2 million in other territories, for a worldwide total of $287.5 million, against a production budget of around $29 million. In its first five days, the film surpassed the total gross of the original ($115.4 million), and also overtook School of Rock ($131.3 million) for the highest grossing musical-comedy of all-time and the third greatest musical debut ever (behind Beauty and the Beast's $174.8 million in 2017 and The Lorax's $70.4 million in 2012). Deadline Hollywood calculated the net profit of the film to be $139.6 million, when factoring together all expenses and revenues for the film.

In the United States and Canada, Pitch Perfect 2 grossed $4.6 million from Thursday night showings and $28.0 million on its opening day, increasing the opening weekend projections from $40 million to $64 million. In its opening weekend, the film grossed $69.2 million, finishing first at the box office. The opening weekend gross was more than the entire gross of the first film in the United States and Canada ($65 million), was the third biggest PG-13 comedy opening of all-time (behind The Simpsons Movie's $74 million in 2007 and Austin Powers in Goldmember's $73 million in 2002) and the highest grossing opening ever for a musical. The opening weekend audience was 75% female.

The film also opened at number one in Australia and New Zealand, grossing $7.6 million and $1.2 million respectively.

=== Critical response ===
On Rotten Tomatoes, the film has an approval rating of 66% based on 216 reviews and an average rating of 6/10. The site's critical consensus reads, "Pitch Perfect 2 sings in sweet comedic harmony, even if it doesn't hit quite as many high notes as its predecessor." On Metacritic, the film has a weighted average score of 63 out of 100, based on 39 critics, indicating "generally favorable reviews". Audiences polled by CinemaScore gave the film an average grade of "A−" on an A+ to F scale.

Leslie Felperin of The Hollywood Reporter wrote: "Reprising the kind of musical performances, campus hijinks, stinging humor and sassy sisterhood put in place by its eminently likeable predecessor, Pitch Perfect 2 remixes the elements and comes up with something even slicker and sharper." Guy Lodge of Variety called it an "ebulliently entertaining, arguably superior sequel to the 2012 musical comedy hit." Lodge added, "Kay Cannon's script is even lighter on narrative than its predecessor, but fills any resulting void with a concentrated supply of riotous gags, and a renewed emphasis on the virtues of female collaboration and independence." Peter Travers of Rolling Stone gave the film 3 out of 4 stars. He welcomed the addition of Steinfeld, praised Wilson for her continued scene stealing, and said the scenes with Keegan-Michael Key were excellent. He reserved his highest praise for Banks, for both her acting and her feature debut as director, applauding her for "bringing fizz to the tiredest clichés and reveling in a screen full of musical girl power."

Richard Roeper of the Chicago Sun-Times gave a mixed review, saying "Pitch Perfect 2 strains to find some plot conflicts while balancing the line between satire and rousing musical numbers." Michael Phillips of the Chicago Tribune called it "a two-hour lesson in how to act like a frenemy to your alleged friends. And it's not funny enough." David Edelstein of New York Magazine gave a negative review and, despite having reviewed the first film positively, described the sequel as "A Ca-Terrible". He was critical of the script, noting "there are good ideas that needed another pass", and of Kendrick's performance, saying "I've never seen her so flat-out bad—distracted, depressed, conviction-less"; however, he conceded that the climactic number was excellent.

Rodrigo Perez at IndieWire wrote "The movie's off-color humor also doesn't connect like it once did either. The casual racism, homophobia and sexism might be tolerable if any of it was remotely funny, but none of it is." Kevin Fallon of The Daily Beast liked the film but was critical of the "tone-deaf racial jokes", particularly the casual racism in the subplot about Flo, a senior Bella singer from Guatemala. He also did not find the racially charged jokes from the commentators funny.

== Accolades ==
List of awards and nominations for Pitch Perfect 2
Year	Awards	Category	Nominees	Result	Ref.
2015	Billboard Music Awards	Top Soundtrack	Pitch Perfect 2 (Various Artists)	Won	
2015	Teen Choice Awards	Choice Movie: Comedy	Pitch Perfect 2	Won	
2015	Teen Choice Awards	Choice Movie Actor: Comedy	Skylar Astin	Won	
2015	Teen Choice Awards	Choice Movie Actress: Comedy	Anna Kendrick	Won	
2015	Teen Choice Awards	Choice Movie Actress: Comedy	Rebel Wilson	Nominated	
2015	Teen Choice Awards	Choice Movie: Chemistry	Brittany Snow and Anna Kendrick	Won	
2015	Teen Choice Awards	Choice Movie: Liplock	Rebel Wilson and Adam DeVine	Nominated	
2015	Teen Choice Awards	Choice Movie: Hissy Fit	Anna Kendrick	Won	
2015	Teen Choice Awards	Choice Movie: Scence Stealer	Green Bay Packers	Nominated	
2015	Teen Choice Awards	Choice Movie: Scence Stealer	Adam DeVine	Nominated	
2015	Teen Choice Awards	Choice Movie: Scence Stealer	Hailee Steinfeld	Nominated	
2016	People's Choice Awards	Favorite Movie	Pitch Perfect 2	Nominated	
2016	People's Choice Awards	Favorite Comedic Movie	Pitch Perfect 2	Won	
2016	People's Choice Awards	Favorite Comedic Movie Actress	Anna Kendrick	Nominated	
2016	People's Choice Awards	Favorite Comedic Movie Actress	Rebel Wilson	Nominated	
2016	Kids' Choice Awards	Favorite Movie	Pitch Perfect 2	Nominated	
2016	Kids' Choice Awards	Favorite Movie Actress	Anna Kendrick, Rebel Wilson	Nominated	
2016	MTV Movie Awards	Best Female Performance	Anna Kendrick	Nominated	
2016	MTV Movie Awards	Best Comedic Performance	Rebel Wilson	Nominated	
2016	MTV Movie Awards	Best Kiss	Rebel Wilson and Adam DeVine	Won	
2016	MTV Movie Awards	Best Ensemble Cast	Pitch Perfect 2	Won	
2016	Golden Raspberry Awards	Razzie Redeemer Award	Elizabeth Banks	Nominated	

== Sequel ==
On April 11, 2015, a month before the release of Pitch Perfect 2, it was announced that Rebel Wilson would return for a third film, although she stated that she did not know if Anna Kendrick or any of the other cast members would also be reprising their roles. She added that she would be "up for a Fat Amy spin-off," although nothing had yet been confirmed. Director, star, and producer Elizabeth Banks acknowledged the possibility of a third film, saying, "I will say, it would be disingenuous to say that no one's talking about a Pitch Perfect 3; the possibility of it. We are really focused on getting as many butts in seats for this one. If fans embrace it, we are going to seriously think about what the continuing journey would look like, but we don't know what that is yet".

On June 10, 2015, a third film was officially confirmed, with Kay Cannon returning to write the script. Several days later it was announced both Kendrick and Wilson would reprise their roles, and later Brittany Snow was also confirmed to return. Banks returned to produce, but in June 2016 it was announced she would not be directing the film.

The film was originally slated for a July 21, 2017 release, and was later pushed back to August 4, 2017, before moving back to the July 21 slot. In May 2016, it was moved again, this time being pushed back to December 22, 2017.
