= Brittany Snow =

American actress (born 1986)

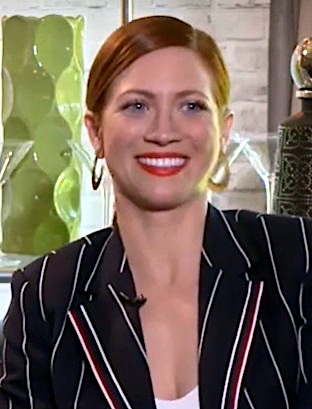
- Snow in 2019
- Born: Brittany Anne Snow; March 9, 1986 (age 40); Tampa, Florida, U.S.
- Occupations: Actress; singer; director
- Years active: 1994–present
- Spouse: Tyler Stanaland (m. 2020; div. 2023)

Brittany Anne Snow (born March 9, 1986) is an American actress, singer and director. She gained recognition for her role in the CBS soap opera Guiding Light (1998–2001), for which she won a Young Artist Award for Best Young Actress and was nominated for two other Young Artist Awards and a Soap Opera Digest Award. She then starred in the NBC drama series American Dreams (2002–2005), for which she was nominated for a Young Artist Award and three Teen Choice Awards.

Snow has appeared in various films, including The Pacifier (2005), John Tucker Must Die (2006), Hairspray (2007), Prom Night (2008), Would You Rather (2012), the Pitch Perfect film series (2012–2017), Bushwick (2017), Someone Great (2019), and X (2022). She appeared in the NBC legal comedy-drama series Harry's Law (2011–2012), the Fox drama series Almost Family (2019–2020), and the Netflix drama series The Hunting Wives (2025–present). Snow made her directorial debut with the drama film Parachute, which premiered at the SXSW festival in March 2023.

Snow is the co-founder of the Love Is Louder movement, a project by the non-profit Jed Foundation, dedicated to stop bullying in schools.

== Early life and education ==
Brittany Anne Snow was born on March 9, 1986, and raised in Tampa, Florida, to a mother of English, Swiss and Italian descent and a father of Scottish, Lebanese and German descent. She is the daughter of Cinda and John Snow. She has a brother and a sister. She attended Gaither High School in Tampa.

== Career ==
Snow began modeling at the age of three in a print ad for Burdines department stores. She was on CBS' soap opera Guiding Light for three years as troubled teen Susan "Daisy" Lemay. She played Meg Pryor on NBC's drama series American Dreams and also sang backup vocals on the American Dreams soundtrack for the song "My Boyfriend's Back." She portrayed neo-Nazi high school student Ariel Alderman on the third season of FX's Nip/Tuck and also appeared in the family comedy film The Pacifier (2005) alongside Lauren Graham and Vin Diesel.

In 2006, Snow appeared in the teen romantic comedy film John Tucker Must Die (2006) opposite Jesse Metcalfe. The film was a commercial success and made $68 million worldwide. Also in the same year, she voiced Naminé in the video game Kingdom Hearts II and Shizuku Tsukishima in the English dub of the Studio Ghibli film Whisper of the Heart. She also portrayed a young woman afflicted with bipolar disorder in the season seven finale of Law & Order: Special Victims Unit and also appeared in the music video for "The Phrase That Pays" by The Academy Is..., which was released in July 2006.

Snow appeared in Hairspray (2007), a film adaptation of the Broadway musical, playing Amber Von Tussle, the daughter of Michelle Pfeiffer's character. She had already worked with Hairspray director Adam Shankman on the Disney film The Pacifier. Through her role in Hairspray, her musical talents were showcased in several numbers, including the solo song "The New Girl in Town," which had previously been removed from the Broadway musical adaptation. She played the lead role of Donna Keppel in the slasher film Prom Night (2008), which was released on April 11, 2008, and grossed $57.2 million at the box office. Snow appeared as young Lily Rhodes in Gossip Girl, in the episode "Valley Girls". On January 17, 2011, Snow began appearing as a series regular in the first season of the legal drama Harry's Law, and returned as a recurring character in season two. She starred alongside Evan Ross in the thriller film 96 Minutes (2011).

In 2012, Snow starred in the musical comedy film Pitch Perfect, as a cappella singer Chloe. She reprised her role in Pitch Perfect 2 (2015), which received generally positive reviews from critics and grossed over $287 million worldwide. It surpassed the total gross of the original film ($115.4 million) in five days, and also became the highest-grossing music comedy film of all time, overtaking School of Rock ($131.3 million). She again reprised her role a final time in Pitch Perfect 3 (2017), which received mixed reviews from critics and grossed $185 million worldwide.

In November 2012, she was cast in the sitcom Ben and Kate as Lila, a love interest for Tommy. Snow portrayed Michelle in the comedy film The Late Bloomer (2016) and had the lead role of Lucy in the action thriller film Bushwick (2017).

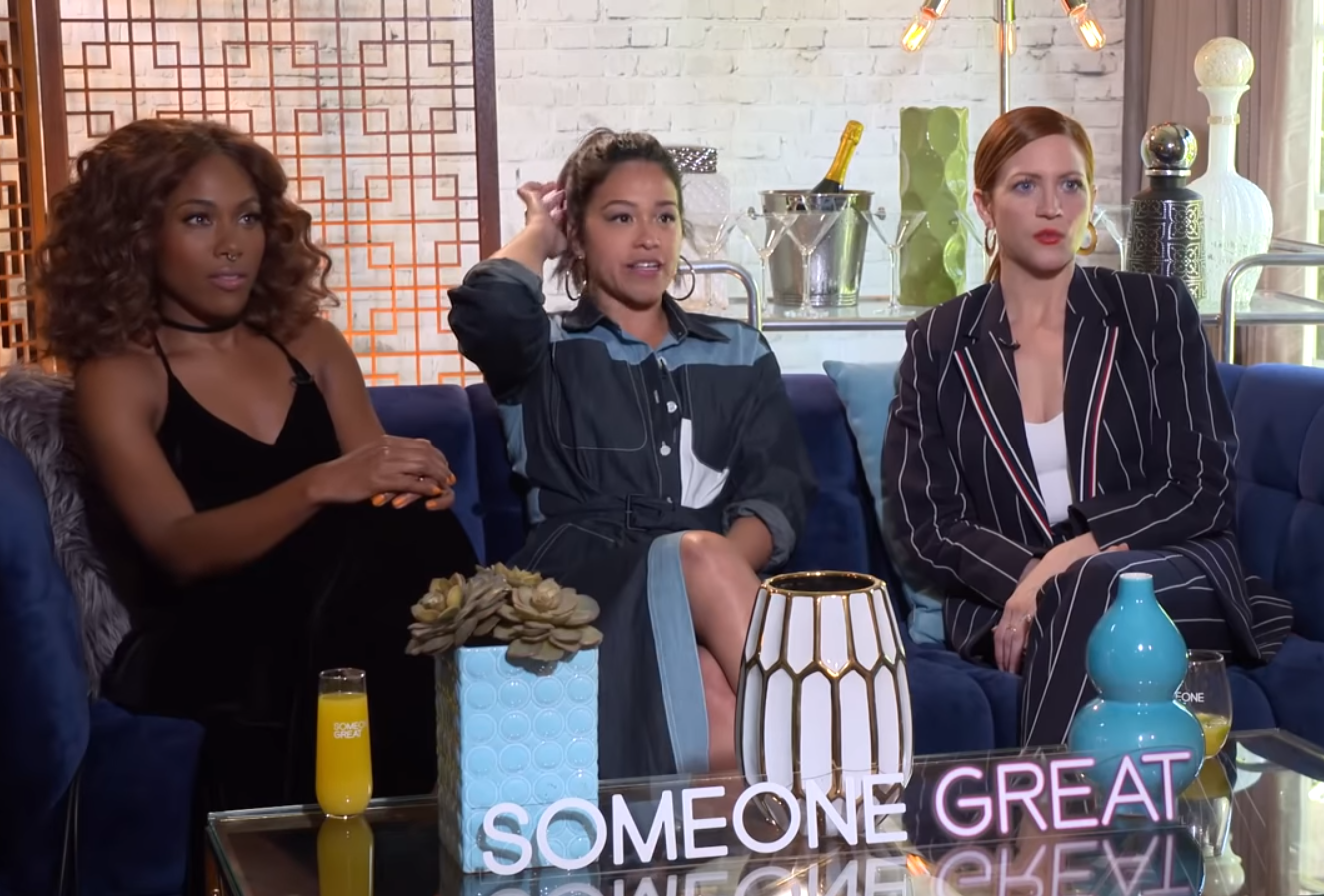
Someone Great (2019) co-stars DeWanda Wise, Gina Rodriguez, and Brittany Snow play the Real Or Fake cocktail game on MTV.

Snow portrayed Blair Helms in Netflix's romantic comedy film Someone Great (2019). She starred in filmmaker Ti West's horror film X (2022) as Bobby-Lynne Parker.

Snow made her directorial debut with Parachute, which premiered at the SXSW festival in March 2023. She starred in the short film Red, White and Blue (2023) as Rachel, a single mother working as a waitress, urgently searching for an abortion. Because she lives in Arkansas, where abortion is effectively illegal, she travels with her preteen daughter Maddy to an abortion clinic in Illinois. It was nominated for Best Live Action Short Film at the 96th Academy Awards. This role marked the first time Snow portrayed a mother, saying: "I think what I related to is that I'm not a mom yet, or necessarily, but I do think a lot of women have to face really hard challenges and yet be very strong and stoic and silent in a way."

In 2025, Snow appeared in the Hulu true crime docudrama miniseries Murdaugh: Death in the Family as real life journalist Mandy Matney who investigated the murders committed by Alex Murdaugh and on the Netflix psychological thriller miniseries The Beast in Me as Nina Jarvis, the wife of a real estate magnate who is suspected of murdering his previous wife.

Snow currently stars alongside Malin Akerman in the drama series The Hunting Wives as Sophie, a woman who moves from Boston to East Texas and begins a sordid affair with Margo (played by Akerman), the wife of her husband's new boss, while getting entangled in the murder of a teenage girl.

== Philanthropy ==
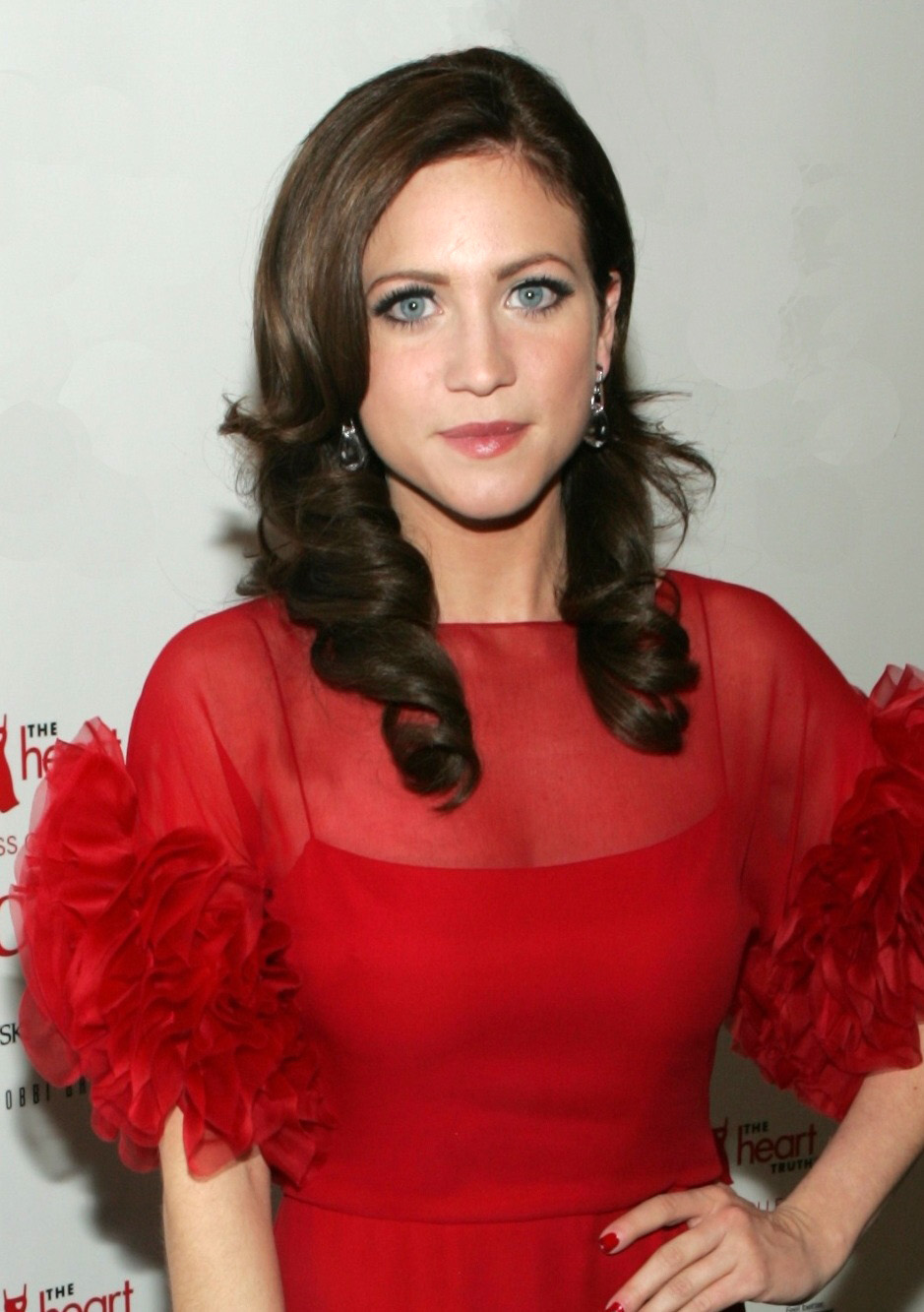
Snow in 2009

Snow is the co-creator of the Love is Louder movement, a project by the not-for-profit Jed Foundation. Thousands of individuals, campuses, and communities have used Love is Louder's programs, events and clubs to address issues such as bullying, body image, discrimination, and depression. Snow was recognized by the Substance Abuse and Mental Health Services Administration in 2015 with a Special Recognition Voice Award for her efforts to bring attention to mental health issues. Together with good friend Jaspre Guest, Snow founded the nonprofit September Letters for mental health awareness, encouraging people to share their personal stories in meaningful anonymous communication. On May 23, 2023, the two launched their collections book September Letters.

== Public image ==
Snow has been featured in pictorials for Zooey Magazine, Vanity Fair, Cosmopolitan and InStyle. She has appeared in television commercials for McDonald's, Busch Gardens and Lipton. Snow walked the runway at the Just Dance fashion show on September 12, 2013.

== Personal life ==
Snow announced her engagement to realtor and pro surfer Tyler Stanaland on February 19, 2019. They married in Malibu on March 14, 2020. Snow announced their separation through social media on September 14, 2022, and the two finalized their divorce in July 2023.

== Filmography ==
=== Film ===
Year	Title	Role	Notes
2005	The Pacifier	Zoe Plummer	
2006	Whisper of the Heart	Shizuku Tsukishima	Voice; English dub
2006	John Tucker Must Die	Kate Spencer	
2007	Hairspray	Amber Von Tussle	
2007	On the Doll	Balery	
2008	Finding Amanda	Amanda Tangerman	
2008	Prom Night	Donna Keppel	
2008	Streak	Baylin	Short film
2009	The Vicious Kind	Emma Gainsborough	
2009	Black Water Transit	Sardoonah	Unreleased
2010	Janie Jones	Iris	
2011	96 Minutes	Carley	
2012	Petunia	Robin McDougal	
2012	Pitch Perfect	Chloe Beale	
2012	Would You Rather	Iris	Also executive producer
2013	Syrup	Three	
2014	There's Always Woodstock	Jody	
2015	Dial a Prayer	Cora	
2015	Pitch Perfect 2	Chloe Beale	
2016	The Late Bloomer	Michelle	
2017	Bushwick	Lucy	
2017	Hangman	Christi Davies	
2017	Pitch Perfect 3	Chloe Beale	
2019	Someone Great	Blair Helms	
2019	Milkshake	—N/a	Short film; director and writer
2020	Hooking Up	Darla Beane	Also producer
2022	X	Bobby-Lynne Parker	
2022	Christmas with the Campbells	Jesse	
2023	The Good Half	Leigh Wheeland	
2023	Red, White and Blue	Rachel	Short film
2023	Parachute	—N/a	Director, producer and writer
2024	The Holiday List	Charlie	
2024	Barron's Cove	Jackie	

=== Television ===
Year	Title	Role	Notes
1998–2001	Guiding Light	Susan "Daisy" Lemay	Main role
1999	Safe Harbor	Sara	Episode: "Dog Day Afternoons and Nights"
2002–2005	American Dreams	Margaret "Meg" Pryor	Lead role; 61 episodes
2003	Miss Teen USA	Herself	Television special; judge
2004	All That	Herself	Guest star; episode: "Brittany Snow/Wakefield"
2005	Nip/Tuck	Ariel Alderman	Recurring role; 5 episodes
2006	Law & Order: Special Victims Unit	Jamie Hoskins	Episode: "Influence"
2009	Family Guy	Candy	Voice; episode: "Quagmire's Baby"
2009	Gossip Girl	Young Lily Rhodes	Episode: "Valley Girls"
2011	Harry's Law	Jenna Backstrom	Main role; 13 episodes
2011	Mad Love	Julia Swanson	Episode: "Little Sister, Big City"
2012–2013	Ben and Kate	Lila	Recurring role; 4 episodes
2013	Call Me Crazy: A Five Film	Lucy	Television film
2014	An American Education	Sarah Miller	Episode: "Pilot"
2015	Full Circle	Katie Parerra	Recurring role; 5 episodes
2015	CMT Music Awards	Herself	Co-host alongside Erin Andrews
2015	TripTank	Stacy	Voice; episode: "Steve's Family"
2016	Workaholics	Erin Mantini	Episode: "Gone Catfishing"
2016–2017	Crazy Ex-Girlfriend	Anna Hicks	Recurring role; 3 episodes
2017	Shimmer and Shine	Nadia	Voice; season 3
2019	The Masked Singer	Herself	Episode: "Return of the Masks: Group C"
2019–2020	Almost Family	Julia Bechley	Main role; 13 episodes
2023	Not Dead Yet	Piper Ashford	Episode: "Not Out of High School Yet"
2024	Top Chef	Herself	Guest judge; episode: "Sausage Race"
2025	The Night Agent	Alice Leeds	Recurring role; season 2
2025	Murdaugh: Death in the Family	Mandy Matney	Miniseries
2025	The Beast in Me	Nina Jarvis	Miniseries
2025–present	The Hunting Wives	Sophie O'Neil	Main role

=== Video games ===
Year	Title	Role	Notes
2006	Kingdom Hearts II	Naminé	
2007	Kingdom Hearts II Final Mix	Naminé	Archival audio
2014	Kingdom Hearts HD 2.5 Remix	Naminé	Archival audio
2015	Skylanders: SuperChargers	Splat	
2017	Kingdom Hearts HD 1.5 + 2.5 Remix	Naminé	Archival audio

=== Music videos ===
Year	Title	Artist	Role
2000	"My Girl, My Boo"	Nu Ground	Love interest
2006	"The Phrase That Pays"	The Academy Is...	Nurse
2008	"Ride"	Cary Brothers	
2008	"Just Impolite"	Plushgun	
2009	"It's Alright, It's OK"	Ashley Tisdale	
2011	"Fire Escape"	Matthew Mayfield	Love interest
2012	"Into the Wild"	LP	
2015	"Crazy Youngsters"	Ester Dean	Herself
2016	"Indian Summer"	Gemio Band	
2017	"Freedom! '90" / "Cups"	The Bellas and The Voice Season 13 Top 12 Contestants	Chloe Beale
2020	"Love On Top"	Cast of Pitch Perfect	Chloe Beale
2025	"Neverland"	Kid Cudi	

== Soundtrack appearances ==
- Hairspray (2007)
- Pitch Perfect (2012)
- Pitch Perfect 2 (2015)
- Pitch Perfect 3 (2017)

== Awards and nominations ==
Year	Association	Category	Work	Result
2000	Young Artist Awards	Best Performance in a Daytime TV Series – Young Actress	Guiding Light	Won
2001	Soap Opera Digest Awards	Outstanding Child Actor	Guiding Light	Nominated
2001	Young Artist Awards	Best Performance in a TV Drama Series – Leading Young Actress	Guiding Light	Nominated
2002	Young Artist Awards	Best Performance in a Soap Opera – Young Actress	Guiding Light	Nominated
2002	Young Artist Awards	Ensemble in a TV Series (Comedy or Drama)	American Dreams	Nominated
2003	Teen Choice Awards	Choice TV Actress Drama	American Dreams	Nominated
2003	Teen Choice Awards	TV Actress – Drama/Action Adventure	American Dreams	Nominated
2004	Teen Choice Awards	TV Breakout Star – Female	American Dreams	Nominated
2007	Hollywood Film Festival	Award for Ensemble of the Year	Hairspray	Won
2007	Palm Springs International Film Festival	Ensemble Cast Award (with cast)	Hairspray	Won
2008	Teen Choice Awards	Choice Movie Actress: Horror/Thriller	Prom Night	Nominated
2011	Boston Film Festival	Prize for Best Actress	96 Minutes	Won
2013	Teen Choice Awards	Choice Movie: Hissy Fit (with Anna Camp, Hana Mae Lee, Rebel Wilson)	Pitch Perfect	Nominated
2013	MTV Movie & TV Awards	Best Musical Moment (shared with rest of cast)	Pitch Perfect	Won
2015	Human Rights Campaign	Ally Award	Love Is Louder	Won
2015	Teen Choice Awards	Choice Movie: Chemistry (with Anna Kendrick)	Pitch Perfect 2	Won
2022	International Online Cinema Awards	Halfway Award for Best Supporting Actress	X	Nominated
2023	Fangoria Chainsaw Awards	Best Supporting Performance	X	Nominated
2023	Dallas International Film Festival	Grand Jury Prize for Narrative Feature	Parachute	Nominated
2023	Raindance Film Festival	Discovery Award for Best Debut Feature	Parachute	Nominated
2023	SXSW Film Festival	SXSW Grand Jury Award for Narrative Feature	Parachute	Nominated
2023	SXSW Film Festival	Thunderbird Rising Special Award	Parachute	Won
2023	Denver International Film Festival	American Independent Award for Best Feature Film	Parachute	Nominated
2024	Cleveland International Film Festival	American Independents Competition	Parachute	Nominated
2024	Cordillera International Film Festival	Festival Award for Best Director Feature Film	Parachute	Won
2024	Mammoth Film Festival	Achievement in Filmmaking – Director	Parachute	Nominated
2024	Mammoth Film Festival	Achievement in Filmmaking – Writer	Parachute	Nominated
