= When I'm Gone =

When I'm Gone may refer to:

- "When I'm Gone" (3 Doors Down song)
- "When I'm Gone" (Albert Hammond song)
- "When I'm Gone" (Alesso and Katy Perry song)
- "When I'm Gone" (Eminem song)
- "When I'm Gone" (Maria Sur song)
- "When I'm Gone" (Motown song), written by Smokey Robinson and recorded by Brenda Holloway and by Mary Wells
- "When I'm Gone" (Simple Plan song)
- "When I'm Gone" (Carter Family song), written by A. P. Carter and recorded originally by the Carter Family, reworked by Anna Kendrick as "Cups"
- "When I'm Gone", by Before You Exit from All the Lights
- "When I'm Gone", by the Click Five from Modern Minds and Pastimes
- "When I'm Gone", by Craig Morgan from A Whole Lot More to Me
- "When I'm Gone", by McAuley Schenker Group from M.S.G.
- "When I'm Gone", by Phil Ochs from Phil Ochs in Concert
- "When I'm Gone", by Randy Newman written for the TV series Monk
- "When I'm Gone", by the Staple Singers from Freedom Highway
- "When I'm Gone (Sadie)", by No Address from Time Doesn't Notice

== See also ==
- Cups (Pitch Perfect's 'When I'm Gone'), by Anna Kendrick
