= Anna Camp =

American actress (born 1982)

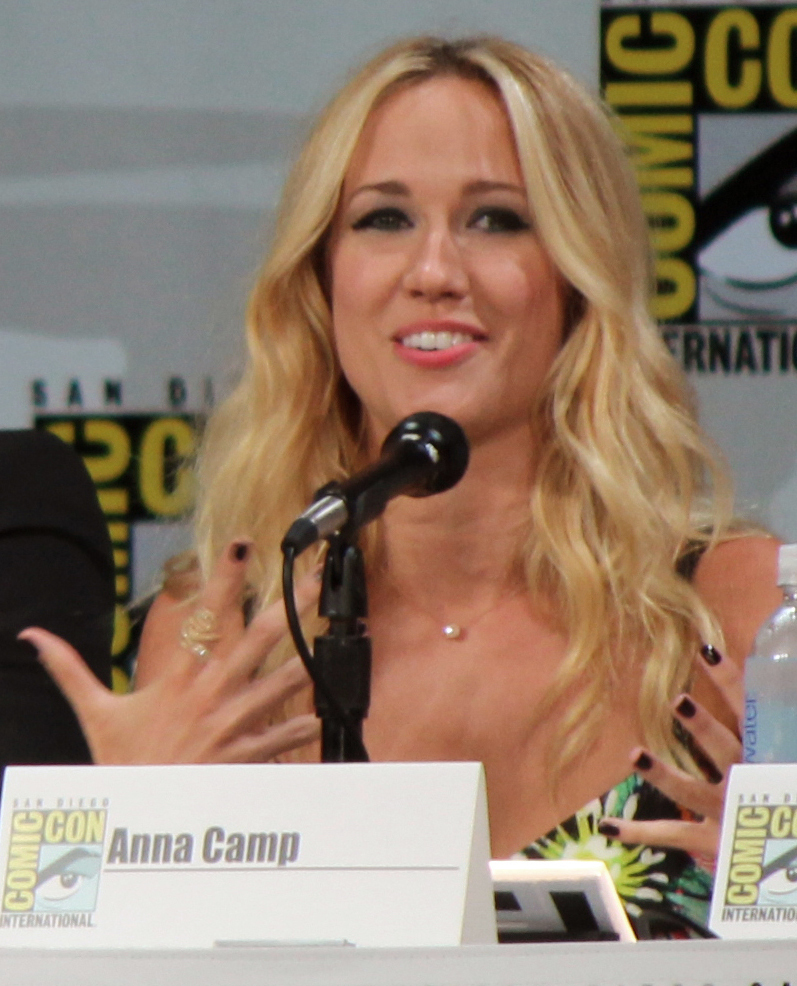
- Camp in 2014
- Born: Anna Ragsdale Camp; September 27, 1982 (age 44); Aiken, South Carolina, U.S.
- Education: University of North Carolina School of the Arts (BFA)
- Occupation: Actress
- Years active: 2005–present
- Spouses: Michael Mosley (m. 2010; div. 2013) Skylar Astin (m. 2016; div. 2019)
- Partner: Jade Whipkey (2025–present)

Anna Ragsdale Camp (born September 27, 1982) is an American actress and singer who portrayed the villainous Sarah Newlin in the HBO vampire drama True Blood (2009, 2012–2014), Aubrey Posen in the Pitch Perfect film series (2012–2017), the dual role of Reagan and Maddie Lockwood in the Netflix thriller You (2025), and Jessica Bowden in the slasher film Scream 7 (2026).

Camp has had recurring roles in the television series Mad Men (2010), The Good Wife (2011–2016), The Mindy Project (2012–2013), and Vegas (2013). She also played Jane Hollander, a researcher for the fictitious News of the Week magazine, in the Amazon Prime series Good Girls Revolt (2016), and had minor roles in the films The Help (2011) and Café Society (2016).

Camp made her Broadway debut in the 2008 production of The Country Girl and played Jill Mason in the 2008 Broadway revival of Peter Shaffer's Equus. In 2012, she was nominated for a Drama Desk Award for her performance in the Off-Broadway play All New People.

== Early life ==
Camp was born in Aiken, South Carolina. Her mother, Dee (née Kornegay), is a Democratic Party volunteer, and her father, Thomas Sewell Camp, is a bank executive.

Camp attended Meadowfield Elementary School and was cast in a Drug Abuse Resistance Education production in the second grade, introducing her to acting. She graduated from the University of North Carolina School of the Arts with a Bachelor of Fine Arts degree in 2004. She moved to New York City shortly thereafter.

== Career ==
Camp played the role of Perfect in columbinus in 2005. In 2007, she was nominated for a Lucille Lortel Award for her performance in the off-Broadway play The Scene. She played Jill Mason in the 2008 Broadway revival of Equus at the Broadhurst Theatre, which starred Daniel Radcliffe as Alan Strang. Speaking about the role, Camp said, "I had a lot of thought; I didn't even know if I was going to do Equus because of the nudity and because of the high profile [aspect] of it. But you only live once and you have to take those risks because you'll only be a better person or actor because of it."

She appeared in Reinventing the Wheelers, a 2007 television pilot which was not ordered to series by ABC. In 2008, she had a role in the pilot of the ABC television dramedy Cashmere Mafia. She had a starring role as Sarah Newlin in the second season of the HBO supernatural drama series True Blood, which earned her a nomination for a SAG Award for Outstanding Performance by an Ensemble in a Drama Series; Camp had earlier auditioned for the role of Sookie Stackhouse.

Camp has made guest appearances on The Office (2009), Glee (2009), Numbers (2010), Covert Affairs (2010), and Elsbeth (2026). She has had recurring roles in the fourth season of the AMC drama series Mad Men (2010), the third season of the CBS legal drama series The Good Wife (2011–2012), and How I Met Your Mother (2013).

In 2011, Camp starred in the premiere of All New People, a play written by Zach Braff and staged at Second Stage Theatre; the production was directed by Peter Dubois and also starred Justin Bartha, David Wilson Barnes and Krysten Ritter.

Camp was a member of the main cast in the first season of Fox sitcom The Mindy Project, and played Aubrey Posen in the 2012 musical comedy film Pitch Perfect, later reprising her role in the sequels Pitch Perfect 2 and Pitch Perfect 3.

She had a recurring role in Netflix's Unbreakable Kimmy Schmidt as Deirdre Robespierre and starred with Nasim Pedrad in Desperados.

In December 2024, it was announced that Camp would appear in Scream 7.

In September 2025, Camp appeared in the Bi-ray music video "Butterfly (Narrative Version)" directed by Japanese rock star Yoshiki.

== Personal life ==
Camp was engaged to actor Michael Mosley by September 2008; they married in 2010 and filed for divorce in 2013. Camp began dating Pitch Perfect co-star Skylar Astin in 2013. The couple were reported to be engaged in January 2016. They married on September 10, 2016. On April 19, 2019, the couple announced that they were filing for divorce. As of late August that year, the divorce was finalized.

As of 2025, Camp is in a relationship with stylist Jade Whipkey. They confirmed their status as a couple at the Los Angeles premiere of Bride Hard. In March 2026, Camp came out publicly as bisexual.

== Filmography ==
=== Film ===
| Year | Title | Role | Notes |
|---|---|---|---|
| 2007 | And Then Came Love | Kikki | |
| 2008 | Pretty Bird | Becca French | |
| 2008 | Just Make Believe | Kristin | Short film |
| 2009 | 8 Easy Steps | Laura | Short film |
| 2010 | Bottleworld | Chrissy | |
| 2011 | The Help | Jolene French | |
| 2012 | Forgetting the Girl | Adrienne Gilcrest | |
| 2012 | Pitch Perfect | Aubrey Posen | MTV Movie Award for Best Musical Moment (shared with cast); Nominated—MTV Movie Award for Best WTF Moment (shared with cast); Nominated—Teen Choice Award for Choice Movie: Hissy Fit (shared with Hana Mae Lee, Brittany Snow, and Rebel Wilson) |
| 2013 | Sequin Raze | Jessica | Short film |
| 2014 | Autumn Wanderer | Sara | |
| 2014 | Goodbye to All That | Debbie Spengler | |
| 2014 | The Oven | Sally Butler | Short film |
| 2015 | Pitch Perfect 2 | Aubrey Posen | |
| 2015 | Caught | Sabrina | |
| 2016 | Café Society | Candy | |
| 2016 | One Night | Elizabeth | |
| 2016 | Brave New Jersey | Peg Prickett | |
| 2017 | The Most Hated Woman in America | Mrs. Lutz | |
| 2017 | Pitch Perfect 3 | Aubrey Posen | |
| 2018 | Egg | Kiki | |
| 2019 | The Wedding Year | Ellie | |
| 2019 | Here Awhile | Anna | |
| 2020 | The Lovebirds | Edie | |
| 2020 | Desperados | Brooke | |
| 2022 | Jerry & Marge Go Large | Dawn | |
| 2022 | Murder at Yellowstone City | Alice Murphy | |
| 2022 | 5,000 Blankets | Cyndi Saunders | |
| 2023 | A Little Prayer | Patti | |
| 2023 | From Black | Cora | |
| 2025 | Bride Hard | Betsy | |
| 2026 | Scream 7 | Jessica Bowden | |

=== Television ===
| Year | Title | Role | Notes |
|---|---|---|---|
| 2007 | Reinventing the Wheelers | Meg Wheeler | Television film |
| 2008 | Cashmere Mafia | Brooke Adaire | Episode: Pilot |
| 2009, 2013–14 | True Blood | Sarah Newlin | Main role (seasons 2, 6–7), 23 episodes Satellite Award: Special Achievement Award (shared with cast); Nominated—Screen Actors Guild Award for Outstanding Performance by an Ensemble in a Drama Series (shared with cast) |
| 2009 | The Office | Penny Beesly | Episode: "Niagara" |
| 2009 | Glee | Candace Dystra | Episode: "Sectionals" |
| 2010 | Numbers | Siouxsie Dark | Episode: "Devil Girl" |
| 2010 | Covert Affairs | Ashley Briggs | Episode: "Houses of the Holy" |
| 2010 | Mad Men | Bethany Van Nuys | 3 episodes |
| 2011 | I Hate That I Love You | Sarah | Television film |
| 2011 | Romantically Challenged | Erin | Episode: "Perry Dates His Assistant" |
| 2011 | Love Bites | Prudence | Episode: "Stand and Deliver" |
| 2011–16 | The Good Wife | Caitlin d'Arcy | 9 episodes |
| 2012 | House of Lies | Rachel Norbert | Episode: "The Gods of Dangerous Financial Instruments" |
| 2012–13 | The Mindy Project | Gwen Grandy | Main role (season 1), 12 episodes |
| 2013 | Vegas | Violet Mills | Recurring role, 4 episodes |
| 2013 | Super Fun Night | Felicity | Unaired pilot |
| 2013 | How I Met Your Mother | Cassie | 2 episodes |
| 2013–15 | Ground Floor | Heather Doyle | 3 episodes |
| 2014 | The League | Penny | Episode: "The Heavenly Fouler" |
| 2014 | Key & Peele | Dr. Carol Roberts | Episode: "Strike Force Eagle 3: The Reckoning" |
| 2014 | Damaged Goods | Nicole | Television film |
| 2014–17 | Sofia the First | Princess Ivy (voice) | 2 episodes |
| 2015 | Star vs. the Forces of Evil | Pixie Empress (voice) | Episode: "Pixtopia" |
| 2015 | Saints & Strangers | Dorothy Bradford | Episode #1.1 |
| 2015 | Resident Advisors | Constance Renfro | Episode: "Conflict Resolution" |
| 2016–17 | Unbreakable Kimmy Schmidt | Deirdre Robespierre | Recurring role (3 episodes); Nominated—Gold Derby Award for Best Comedy Guest Actress |
| 2016 | The $100,000 Pyramid | Herself / Celebrity Guest | Episode: "Anna Camp vs. Randall Park" |
| 2016 | Good Girls Revolt | Jane Hollander | 10 episodes |
| 2018 | The Stinky & Dirty Show | Sender (voice) | Episode: "Love Notes" |
| 2018–20 | Harvey Girls Forever! | Chevron (voice) | 5 episodes |
| 2019 | Vampirina | Bride of Frankenstein (voice) | Episode: "Franken-Wedding" |
| 2019–20 | Puppy Dog Pals | Donna (voice) | 2 episodes |
| 2019–20 | Perfect Harmony | Ginny | Main role, 13 episodes |
| 2020 | Creepshow | Irena Reid | Episode: "A Creepshow Holiday Special: Shapeshifters Anonymous" |
| 2023 | Is It Cake? | Herself / Judge | Episode: "That 90's Cake" |
| 2024 | Hysteria! | Tracy Whitehead | 8 episodes |
| 2025 | You | Raegan and Maddie Lockwood | Main role (season 5) |
| 2026 | DMV | Robin | Episode: "The Fourth Wheel" |
| 2026 | The Fall and Rise of Reggie Dinkins | Narcissa Ocean | 2 episodes |
| 2026 | Elsbeth | Juliet Woodbent | Episode: "Murder from Scratch" |
| 2026 | A Very Haunted Renovation | Self / Host | Full Season |

=== Web ===
| Year | Title | Role | Notes |
|---|---|---|---|
| 2013 | CollegeHumor Originals | Dana | Episode: "FOMO Horror Movie Trailer" |

=== Music videos ===
| Year | Title | Artist(s) | Role | Ref. |
|---|---|---|---|---|
| 2010 | "Marry Me" | Train | Waitress | |
| 2015 | "Crazy Youngsters" | Ester Dean | Herself | |
| 2017 | "Freedom! '90" / "Cups" | The Bellas and The Voice Season 13 Top 12 Contestants | Aubrey Posen | |
| 2020 | "Love On Top" | Cast of Pitch Perfect | Aubrey Posen | |
| 2025 | "Butterfly (Narrative Version)" | Bi-ray | Betsy | |

== Soundtrack appearances ==
- Pitch Perfect (2012)
- Pitch Perfect 2 (2015)
- Pitch Perfect 3 (2017)

== Awards and nominations ==
| Year | Award | Category | Work | Outcome |
|---|---|---|---|---|
| 2009 | Satellite Awards | Best Ensemble Acting in a Drama Series | True Blood | Won |
| 2010 | Screen Actors Guild Awards | Outstanding Ensemble in a Drama Series | True Blood | Nominated |
| 2013 | MTV Movie Awards | Best WTF Moment | Pitch Perfect | Nominated |
| 2013 | MTV Movie Awards | Best Musical Moment (Shared with Rebel Wilson, Anna Kendrick, Brittany Snow, Alexis Knapp, Ester Dean, and Hana Mae Lee) | Pitch Perfect | Won |
