= Maggie Kiley =

American filmmaker and actress

Maggie Kiley is an American filmmaker and actress.

== Career ==
Kiley most recently directed her second feature, Dial a Prayer, from a script she wrote. The film stars Brittany Snow, William H Macy and Glenne Headly and was acquired by Vertical Entertainment for a Spring 2015 release. She is currently in post on a third feature, thriller titled Caught with independent producer Jennifer Westin and Mar Vista Entertainment. Caught stars Anna Camp as a desperate housewife who abducts the mistress (Stefanie Scott) of her cheating husband and all goes south. Kiley's first feature, Brightest Star premiered at the Austin Film Festival and was released via Warner Brothers and Gravitas in early 2014. Brightest Star was made through the support of the Panavision New Filmmaker Grant and was inspired by the award-winning short film Some Boys Don't Leave. Cast includes Chris Lowell, Rose McIver, Allison Janney, Clark Gregg and Jessica Szohr.

Kiley was one of eight women selected to take part in American Film Institute's prestigious Directing Workshop for Women and it was through her participation in this program that she made Some Boys Don't Leave. The film stars Jesse Eisenberg and Eloise Mumford. Kiley received the Student Visionary Award at the Tribeca Film Festival and the Alexis Award for Best Emerging Student Filmmaker at Palm Springs International Shortfest for the film. In November 2014 it was announced that Kiley was included as one of the 20 accomplished female filmmakers chosen to participate in the Fox Global Directors Initiative, a new multi-year program by the studio to develop the talents and networking pools of promising women directors.

As an actress, Kiley has appeared in film, television and on stage. She has worked extensively at Atlantic Theater Company in New York City where she is one of just 40 ensemble members. Kiley received her BFA in Theater from New York University and was invited to join the critically acclaimed ensemble after graduating. Kiley has worked with such film and television directors as James Gray, Lesli Linka Glatter, Andrew Jarecki, Daisy von Scherler Mayer and Documentarian Nathaniel Kahn.

Kiley is developing a series for television with Laverne McKinnon for Denver and Delilah Productions. In 2017, Lucasfilm hired Kiley as a "resource" for Solo: A Star Wars Story.

== Filmography ==
Short film

- Down the Shore (2009)
- Some Boys Don't Leave (2009) (Also writer)
- 6ate7 (2017)

Feature film

Year	Title	Role	Director	Writer
2007	We Own the Night	Sandra Grusinsky		
2013	Brightest Star		Yes	
2015	Dial a Prayer		Yes	
2015	Caught		No	

Television

Year	Title	Director	Executive Producer	Notes
2016	Guidance	Yes	No	4 episodes
2016	Scream Queens	Yes	No	Episode: "Lovin the D"
2016	Caring	Yes	No	All 5 episodes
2017	American Horror Story	Yes	No	Episode: "Holes"
2017–2019	Riverdale	Yes	No	3 episodes
2018, 2025	9-1-1	Yes	No	2 episodes
2018	Insatiable	Yes	No	Episode: "WMBS"
2018	Chilling Adventures of Sabrina	Yes	No	2 episodes
2018	Nightflyers	Yes	No	Episode: "White Rabbit"
2018–2019	Impulse	Yes	No	2 episodes
2019	The Gifted	Yes	No	Episode: "meMento"
2019	What/If	Yes	No	Episode: "What Secrets"
2020	Katy Keene	Yes	No	2 episodes
2020	Dirty John	Yes	Co-executive	4 episodes
2021	Dr. Death	Yes	Yes	2 episodes
2022	Keep Breathing	Yes	Yes	3 episodes
2022–2024	Pretty Little Liars	Yes	No	3 episodes
2024	American Sports Story	Yes	No	2 episodes
2024	Doctor Odyssey	Yes	No	2 episodes
2024	Brilliant Minds	Yes	No	Episode: "The First Responder"
2025	Grosse Pointe Garden Society	Yes	Yes	2 episodes
2025	Devil in Disguise: John Wayne Gacy	Yes	No	2 episodes
