= Pitch Perfect (disambiguation) =

Pitch Perfect is a 2012 American film.

Pitch Perfect may also refer to:

- Pitch Perfect (franchise), including the 2012 film and two sequels
- Pitch Perfect (soundtrack), from the 2012 film

== See also ==
- Perfect pitch
