= Cup game =

Rhythmic game based on manipulating cups

The cup game is a children's clapping game that involves tapping and hitting a cup using a defined rhythm. The game can be played by many players seated around a table and is often played in large groups. Each player possesses a cup and in unison the players tap out the defined rhythm using their cups. It can be played competitively, where the rhythm speeds up in each "round", and a player making a mistake in the rhythm must drop out of the game, with a new "round" starting after each elimination, and game play continuing until only one player remains, with that player being the winner.

== Rhythm ==
=== Basic rhythm ===
The cup game begins with a cup placed upside down in front of each player. Assuming a right-handed player, the rhythm normally proceeds as follows:

- Beat #1: Clap twice
- Beat #2: Alternating hands, quickly tap the top of the cup with the fingertips three times (In some variations, the table on either side of the cup is tapped)
- Beat #3: Clap once
  - Pick up the cup with the right hand and move it to the right
- Beat #4: Put the cup down onto the table (still upside down) with a firm percussive motion
- Beat #1: Clap once
  - Pick up the cup with the right hand so that the cup is now right-side up
- Beat #2: Tap the top of the cup (the open end of the cup) with the flat of the left hand so as to make a hollow-sounding hit
  - Put the cup down onto the table (now right-side up) with a firm percussive motion, but keeping the right hand on the cup
- Beat #3: Switch the cup into your left hand
  - Slap the right hand down flat onto the table
- Beat #4: With the cup still in the left hand, return the cup to its original starting position, upside down on the table in front of the player.

Repeat the above sequence indefinitely until a mistake is made by a player, such as being off-beat, knocking the cup over, missing a step, etc. Some versions involve variations where the players exchange cups during the performance of the rhythm, or players slap hands with each other.

=== Lulu and the Lampshades ===
In the Lulu and the Lampshades (and newer) performances, this is the right hand which slaps down flat onto the table.

- Beat #1: Clap twice or thrice
- Beat #2: Alternating hands, rapidly tap the top of the cup with the fingertip three times (In some variations, the table on either side of the cup is tapped)
- Beat #3: Clap once
  - Pick up the cup with the right hand and move it to the right
- Beat #4: Put the cup down onto the table (still upside down) with a firm percussive motion
- Beat #1: Clap once
  - Pick up the cup with the right hand (thumb down) so that the cup is now right-side up
- Beat #2: Tap the top of the cup (the open end of the cup) with the flat of the left hand so as to make a hollow-sounding hit
  - Put the cup down onto the table (now right-side up) with a firm percussive motion, but keeping the right hand on the cup
- Beat #3: With the cup still in the right hand, tap the bottom of the cup with the flat of the left hand and take it with the left hand
  - Slap the right hand down flat onto the table (near the player's left side)
- Beat #4: With the cup now in the left hand, return the cup to its original starting position, upside down on the table in front of the player (or in front of the player to the right) with a firm percussive motion

Repeat the above sequence indefinitely.

== In music ==
Christian singer Rich Mullins used the cup game to accompany his song "Screen Door" on his 1987 album Pictures in the Sky. It was used by Palavra Cantada (Paulo Tatit & Sandra Peres) in 1998 with the song "Fome Come" from their album "Canções Curiosas". In 2009 the band Lulu and the Lampshades used the game in their performance of the 1931 Carter Family song "When I'm Gone" as modified to suit the game by "Lulu" (Luisa Gerstein). Rapper P.O.S also uses the cup game in "Optimist (We Are Not for Them)" from his 2009 album Never Better. In 2011 the cup game was again used by Anna Burden to accompany the song "When I'm Gone" in a YouTube video that went viral. Anna Kendrick taught herself to copy Burden's video, and this was worked into her performance in the 2012 film Pitch Perfect, her version "Cups (When I'm Gone)" in turn becoming widely copied with a 2013 video after the single from the soundtrack rose on the national and international charts.

== Other cup games ==
There are older cup games as well, with rhythmic moving and passing of cups. Often there is a particular place in the rhythm where the passing is different, faster, or more difficult, and missing this pass puts a player "out", a new "round" beginning with each elimination, and the last player winning.

One such game is called "Acitrón de un fandango" (or various alternate spelling), and is said to originate in Mexico.
