= No Address =

American alternative rock/post-grunge band

No Address is an American alternative rock/post-grunge band, from Tallahassee, Florida, United States. They are best known for their single "When I'm Gone (Sadie)" (#12 - Mainstream Rock Tracks, No. 21 - Modern Rock Tracks). On May 18, 2007, melodic.net posted an article about lead singer Ben Lauren's future solo album under the Indegoot Entertainment umbrella.

== Band break up ==
The band announced their breakup on Wednesday, September 6, 2006, in a MySpace blog with the headline "The End". Here is the posted blurb: "I wish that I could be more specific about what happened. It's a long story and it doesn't matter anyhow. What matters is that the old makes way for the new. We are all still doing music in some capacity, some of us are together and some of us aren't. Bands break up, relationships change, music takes us other places. "Time Doesn't Notice" and the tours in 2005 were precious memories for all of us and YOU made that happen for No Address. Thanks so much for giving us such great experiences."

== Reunion ==
On June 21, 2007, the band cryptically announced a possible reunion in a MySpace blog with the headline "The New Old No Address Record: Let It Out." The blog hints that a new record may be in the band's future. On July 13, 2007, Ben Lauren posted a bulletin on MySpace saying "All original members are back. A new record is being recorded beginning in September. Very exciting news!".

In late April, 2009, Ben Lauren sent a cryptic message through Twitter that hinted to a reunion. The details were released at a later date that No Address would be headlining the Second Annual Soldier City Benefit For The Troops on May 16, 2009, in St. Cloud, Florida. Lauren is currently a professor at University of Miami.

== Current line-up ==
- Ben Lauren - Vocals
- Justin Long - Guitar
- Randy Lane - Drums
- Bill Donaldson - Bass
- Phil Moreton - Guitar

== Discography ==
- Let It Out (November 12, 2003)
- Time Doesn't Notice (April 26, 2005)
