= Matthew Puckett =

American musician

- Born: New York City, New York
- Website: Matthew Puckett

Matthew Puckett is an American film composer, songwriter, and music producer. Born and raised in New York City, he attended the Fiorello H. LaGuardia High School of Music & Art and Performing Arts and received his BFA from NYU. Puckett lives in Los Angeles, California.

== Songwriting and Musical Theater ==
Puckett has written and produced for artists including Rogue Wave, The Mowgli's, Jeremy Jordan (actor, born 1984), Kris Allen, Abraham Mateo, Shawn Hook, Royal Tongues, Glen Phillips, Jessica Mitchell (Canadian Idol (season 2)), Clementine and The Galaxy, Danny Fingers, Ryan Innes (The Voice (U.S. season 4)), Mama Casio, BEGINNERS, Nikki Webster, The Unlikely Candidates, Garrison Starr, Adrianne Gonzalez and Kyler England (The Rescues / Universal Republic). Puckett wrote the ASCAP Award Winning theme song "Skyline" for NY MED on ABC as well as "Everything I Want" for the Peabody Award-winning ABC show Boston Med.

His musical Rebel Genius was a finalist for the 2017 Jonathan Larson Award presented by Jonathan Larson Performing Arts Foundation and American Theater Wing. Matthew was selected by IAMA Theater Company to receive their 2019 Musical Theater commission, scheduled for workshop in Spring 2022. He signed a publishing deal with SONGS Music Publishing in 2014. Puckett is currently represented by Kobalt Music Group. In 2023, he released and began performing a new song cycle titled Song from the Evergreen.

== Film and TV Composition ==
Puckett wrote the score for the film Before I Go (Starring Annabella Sciorra, 2021), AwesomenessTV series Guidance, Gravity (Starz) and for the films Caught (Lifetime Network, Dial a Prayer (Vertical Entertainment), Brightest Star and Boy Meets Girl Directed by Eric Schaeffer (GLAAD Outstanding Film Nominee, 2016). His songs, themes, and scores have been featured in Riverdale (2017 TV series), Lucifer (TV series), NY Med (ABC Series), After Fall, Winter (Showtime), She Wants Me, 2BR/2BA (Lionsgate), Best Friends Forever, Particles of Truth (75 Films), Hooking Up (ABC), Lisa Williams Show (Lifetime), and Crazy Sexy Cancer (TLC).

Additional film and television credits include: Being Human (Syfy) which featured Puckett's cover version of The Psychedelic Furs "The Ghost In You", the score and end title song for Some Boys Don't Leave (Winner of Best Short at the 2010 Tribeca Film Festival) starring Jesse Eisenberg, score and songs for Particles Of Truth (75 Films, Sundance Channel), Colin Fitz (IFC / Official Selection Sundance), Never Again (Focus Features), Starved (FX) and Make It or Break It (Disney). His music was also featured in the ABC show Hopkins, in which he is credited for the theme song, "So Much To Say" and other music and songs for the series.

Puckett has also written the original music for the collection of short Off Broadway plays entitled New Works: Chance, the theme for the documentary "Jackie" and television commercials for KIA, Coke, Diet Coke and Verizon.

== Songwriter Discography ==
- Burned Like Wood (1998) as Puckett
- 23 (2002) as Puckett
- Matthew Puckett - Sad Little Car (2004)
- Matthew Puckett - Five Dreams Of Being (2005)
- Matthew Puckett - The Goodbye EP (2008)
- Some Boys Don't Leave - Music From And Inspired By The Film (2009)
- Andreas Stone (2009)
- Lynhurst - "One of These Days" (2009)
- Cathy Heller - "Turn the Sunshine On" (2010)
- Matthew Puckett - Red Flowers (2010)
- After Fall Winter - Soundtrack (2013)
- Matthew Puckett - All Our Hands In The Air (2013)
- Brightest Star - Soundtrack (2013)
- Mama Casio - "Shut the Lights Up - feat. BEGINNERS" (2014)
- Danny Fingers and The Thumbs - "Cinelife" (2014)
- The 3am - "Come Over" (2015)
- Abraham Mateo - "Body Language" (2015)
- The Silent War - "Just A Little Rain" (2015)
- Royal Tongues - "Rollin' On" (2015)
- The Wealthy West - "That Silver Line" (2016)
- Rogue Wave - "California Bride" (2017)
- Jessica Mitchell - "Rain for the River" (2018)
- Ryan Innes - "Right To Be Wrong" (2018)
- Garrison Starr - Just A Little Rain" (2020)
- Rebel Genius: The Musical (Feat. Corey Cott) - "Faster" & "What Love Looks Like" (2021)
