= Bushwick (film) =

2017 American film

- Theatrical release poster
- Directed by: Jonathan Milott; Cary Murnion
- Screenplay by: Nick Damici; Graham Reznick
- Story by: Jonathan Milott; Cary Murnion
- Produced by: Nate Bolotin; Adam Folk; Joseph Mensch
- Starring: Dave Bautista; Brittany Snow; Angelic Zambrana; Jeremie Harris; Myra Lucretia Taylor; Alex Breaux; Arturo Castro
- Cinematography: Lyle Vincent
- Edited by: Joe Hobeck
- Music by: Aesop Rock
- Production companies: Bullet Pictures; Mensch Productions; XYZ Films
- Distributed by: RLJ Entertainment
- Release dates: January 21, 2017 (Sundance); August 25, 2017
- Running time: 93 minutes
- Country: United States
- Language: English
- Box office: $67,880

Bushwick is a 2017 American action thriller film directed by Jonathan Milott and Cary Murnion and written by Nick Damici and Graham Reznick. The film follows a military veteran (Dave Bautista) and a graduate student (Brittany Snow) who are caught in an invasion of New York City by a secessionist militia, as they work together to rescue family members and reach a civilian evacuation point.

== Plot ==
In the Bushwick neighborhood of Brooklyn, second-year civil engineering graduate student Lucy and her boyfriend Jose exit a subway train into an empty station, when a man runs in on fire. Jose tries to investigate but is killed in an explosion. Lucy tries to find help in the chaos and is chased by two men into a house owned by Stupe, a former U.S. Navy hospital corpsman, who kills the men. Stupe reveals martial law has been declared and that he will try to find his family in Hoboken, New Jersey, and Lucy decides to join him to rescue her grandmother. Along the way, Stupe gets injured and trains Lucy in giving first aid and shooting a gun.

The pair reach Lucy's grandmother's house, but they find her already dead from heart failure, and flee pursuing gunmen by seeking refuge in the house of Belinda, Lucy's sister. A mercenary breaks in but is subdued and interrogated by Stupe. The mercenary reveals that Texas has seceded from the United States alongside Louisiana, Florida, North Carolina, South Carolina, West Virginia, and Georgia, alongside parts of Maryland and Pennsylvania, to form the New American Coalition (NAC). The NAC planned to fight an insurgency in American cities, specifically targeting neighborhoods with "defenseless" minorities such as Bushwick to seize first, but they did not account for such fierce armed resistance from the civilian populace. Stupe convinces the mercenary to reveal the DMZ, where the U.S. Army is extracting non-combatants: Grover Cleveland Park in Queens. Stupe knocks out the mercenary and the trio set off for the park.

Along the way, the trio witness citizen uprisings in the streets and encounter James and his mother, who take Belinda hostage in their home and order Stupe and Lucy to organize a resistance cell of evacuees and gang members seeking refuge at the local church; there, the church's priest, the intended leader of the resistance, kills himself, but the others agree to fight. As they wait for James, his mother, and Belinda to arrive at their rally point in a laundromat, Stupe reveals his family died in the September 11 attacks and that he was trying to abandon Lucy on the way to Hoboken, but admits he is glad they stuck together. However, when he tries to go to the washroom, he encounters a scared teenage girl hiding inside, who mistakenly shoots and kills him in a panic. Despite the loss, Lucy, Belinda, and the resistance leave for Queens.

The evacuees reach the DMZ, where the U.S. Army is already battling the mercenaries, and the resistance fights their way to the rescue helicopters. During the fight, Lucy and Belinda stick together, but Belinda is shot in the leg; Lucy tries to save her and is shot and killed. Belinda cries in horror as resistance fighters carry her away, as the shot pans to reveal New York City burning.

== Cast ==
- Dave Bautista as Stupe
- Brittany Snow as Lucy
- Angelic Zambrana as Belinda
- Jeff Lima as Gregory
- Paco Lozano as Priest
- Christian Navarro as Eduardo
- Arturo Castro as Jose
- Jeremie Harris as J.P.
- Myra Lucretia Taylor as Ma
- Alex Breaux as Lieutenant Brewer

== Production ==
On March 4, 2015, it was announced that Jonathan Milott and Cary Murnion would direct the disaster action thriller film Bushwick based on the script by Nick Damici and Graham Reznick, while producers would be XYZ Films' Nate Bolotin and Bullet Pictures' Adam Folk. Jane Levy was attached to play the female lead role of Lucy. On September 9, 2015, Dave Bautista also joined the film to play war veteran Stupe. On November 4, 2015, Brittany Snow was cast in the film, replacing Levy. The score was composed by rapper and producer Aesop Rock. Lakeshore Records has released the soundtrack.

Principal photography on the film began early December 2015 in Brooklyn, New York City.

== Release ==
The movie premiered in the US at the Sundance Film Festival January 21, 2017 and internationally at the Cannes Film Festival in the Quinzaine des Réalisateurs section on May 25, 2017 before being released globally on Netflix August 25, 2017.

== Reception ==
=== Critical response ===
On review aggregator Rotten Tomatoes, the film has an approval rating of 47% based on 72 reviews, with an average rating of 5.44/10. The site's critical consensus reads, "Bushwick's sociopolitical subtext gives it more heft than the average action thriller, but those ideas are given short shrift in what amounts to a disappointing shoot-'em-up." On Metacritic, the film has a weighted average score of 44 out of 100, based on reviews from 24 critics, indicating "mixed or average" reviews.

Simon Crook for Empire praised the film calling it a brilliant B-movie with a political punch and called for a sequel. Geoff Berkshire at Variety wrote that "Even if the low-budget execution is uneven at times, there's enough snap to the filmmaking, and enough raw power in the premise, to make for solid B-movie excitement. Chuck Bowen of Slant Magazine called it "a genre film with a refreshing sense of political infrastructure".
