= Brightest Star (film) =

2013 romantic comedy film directed by Maggie Kiley

- Film poster
- Directed by: Maggie Kiley
- Written by: Maggie Kiley; Matthew Mullen
- Based on: Some Boys Don't Leave by Maggie Kiley
- Produced by: Jason Potash; Paul Finkel; Kyle Heller; Gina Resnick
- Starring: Chris Lowell; Rose McIver; Jessica Szohr; Clark Gregg; Allison Janney
- Cinematography: Chayse Irvin
- Edited by: Franklin Peterson; Cindy Thoennessen
- Music by: Matthew Puckett
- Production companies: Storyboard Entertainment; What a World Productions; Varient
- Distributed by: Gravitas Ventures
- Release dates: October 26, 2013 (Austin Film Festival); January 31, 2014 (wide)
- Running time: 80 minutes
- Country: United States
- Language: English

Brightest Star (also titled Light Years) is a 2013 American independent romantic comedy film directed by Maggie Kiley and starring Chris Lowell and Rose McIver. The film, which also marks Kiley's directorial debut, is based on her 2009 short film Some Boys Don't Leave.

== Plot ==
After his girlfriend dumps him, a young man (Chris Lowell) tries to become the kind of person she desires, but his growing love for a singer (Jessica Szohr) and some advice from an astronomer (Allison Janney) help him remain true to himself.

== Cast ==
- Chris Lowell as The Boy
- Rose McIver as Charlotte Cates
- Jessica Szohr as Lita Markovic
- Alex Kaluzhsky as Ray
- Clark Gregg as Mr. Markovic
- Allison Janney as The Astronomer
- Elvy Yost as Jodi
- Peter Jacobson as Dr. Lambert

== Reception ==
On review aggregator Rotten Tomatoes, the film holds an approval rating of 13% based on 15 reviews, with an average rating of 4.17/10. On Metacritic, the film has a weighted average score of 32 out of 100, based on nine critics, indicating "generally unfavorable" reviews.

Glenn Kenny of RogerEbert.com gave it one and a half stars.
