= Pitch Perfect 3 (soundtrack) =

Pitch Perfect 3: Original Motion Picture Soundtrack

Soundtrack album by various artists
- Released: December 15, 2017
- Genres: A cappella; pop
- Length: 60:07
- Label: Universal Music
- Producer: Harvey Mason Jr.

Singles from Pitch Perfect 3: Original Motion Picture Soundtrack
- 1. "Freedom! 90 x Cups" Released: November 21, 2017

Pitch Perfect 3: Original Motion Picture Soundtrack is the soundtrack to the 2017 film Pitch Perfect 3. It was released on December 15, 2017, through Universal Music and featured 19 tracks. The lead single that preceded the soundtrack was the mashup of George Michael's "Freedom! '90" with "Cups", the song from the first film, released as "Freedom! 90 x Cups" on November 20. A special edition soundtrack featuring three additional tracks was released on March 2, 2018.

== Background ==
The Pitch Perfect 3 soundtrack comprises a cappella mashups and medleys of popular music ranging from George Michael's "Freedom! '90", the 19th-century Christmas song "Silent Night" and Frank Loesser's "Baby, It's Cold Outside" (1944), along with contemporary music. The album was executively produced by music supervisors Julianne Jordan and Julia Michels, and produced by producer-songwriter Harvey Mason Jr. According to Universal Pictures executive vice president of music, Mike Knobloch, the production and music team spent most time on conceiving the number for "Freedom! 90", which was intended as the highlight of the final instalment.

The cast of the film along with the finalists of the 13th season of the NBC reality show The Voice recorded a mashup of "Freedom! 90 x Cups", which was broadcast on November 21 and released as the single the same day. It was eventually made available for digital download to audiences along with pre-bookings at the Fandango website.

== Reception ==
Danielle Burgos of Bustle wrote that the film's soundtrack "gives new life to pop hits and features a full slate of amazing covers that cross genres and defy expectations." Craig Elvy of Screen Rant felt that "as far as the soundtrack is concerned, it appears that Pitch Perfect 3 is serving up more of the same for this third—and supposedly final—installment."

== Track listing ==
Pitch Perfect 3: Original Motion Picture Soundtrack track listing
No.	Title	Writer(s)	Performer	Length
1.	"Universal Fanfare"	Jerry Goldsmith; Brian Tyler (Note: 1997–2011 Universal fanfare composed by Goldsmith; 2012 Universal fanfare composed and arranged by Tyler.)	The Bellas	0:38
2.	"Toxic" (Britney Spears cover)	Cathy Dennis; Christian Karlsson; Pontus Winnberg; Henrik Jonback	The Bellas	3:21
3.	"Sit Still, Look Pretty" (Daya cover)	Gino Barletta; Mike Campbell; Britten Newbill	The New Barden Bellas	3:06
4.	"Riff Off (Get the Party Started / Shut Up and Dance / Ignition (Remix) / Let Me Ride / Fly Away / One More Night / Call Me / Love Me Harder / If I Were a Boy / Zombie / Stronger (What Doesn't Kill You) / Grenade / Human / Wake Me Up)" (medley of songs by Pink, Walk the Moon, R. Kelly, Dr. Dre, Lenny Kravitz, Maroon 5, Blondie, Ariana Grande and the Weeknd, Beyoncé, the Cranberries, Kelly Clarkson, Bruno Mars, Christina Perri and Avicii)	Linda Perry; Ben Berger; Eli Maiman; Ryan McMahon; Nicholas Petricca; Kevin Ray; Sean Waugaman; R. Kelly; RBX; Snoop Doggy Dogg; Kravitz; Adam Levine; Shellback; Max Martin; Savan Kotecha; Debbie Harry; Giorgio Moroder; Peter Svensson; Ali Payami; Abel Tesfaye; Ahmad Balshe; Brittany Jean Carlson; Toby Gad; Dolores O'Riordan; Greg Kurstin; Jörgen Elofsson; Ali Tamposi; David Gamson; Mars; Philip Lawrence; Ari Levine; Brody Brown; Claude Kelly; Andrew Wyatt; Perri; Martin Johnson; Tim Bergling; Egbert Dawkins; Mike Einziger	The Bellas, Evermoist, Saddle Up, Young Sparrow and DJ Dragon Nutz, Soldiers	4:48
5.	"You Got It"	Nicholas Williams; Harvey Mason Jr.; Ray Davies (Note: "You Got It" interpolates "You Really Got Me" by the Kinks, written by Davies.); Marcos Palacios; Ernest Tuo Clark	Young Sparrow and DJ Dragon Nutz	3:16
6.	"Ex's & Oh's" (Elle King cover)	King; Dave Bassett	Saddle Up	2:49
7.	"How a Heart Unbreaks"	Carlson; Kara DioGuardi; Bassett	Evermoist	3:44
8.	"Cheap Thrills" (Sia feat. Sean Paul cover)	Sia Furler; Kurstin; Sean Paul Henriques	The Bellas	3:40
9.	"I Don't Like It, I Love It" (Flo Rida feat. Robin Thicke and Verdine White)	Alexander Izquierdo; Breyan Stanley Isaac; Geoffrey Early; Gary Hill; Jamie Sanderson; Pierre-Antoine Melki; Raphaël Judrin; Thomas Troelsen; Tramar Dillard	The Bellas	3:59
10.	"Cake by the Ocean" (DNCE cover)	Joseph Jonas; Justin Tranter; Mattias Larsson; Robin Fredriksson	The Bellas	3:14
11.	"Freedom! '90" (George Michael cover)	Michael	The Bellas	5:16
12.	"Soy Yo"	Li Saumet; Joe London; Simón Mejía; Ricky Reed	Bomba Estéreo	2:41
13.	"Boom Boom" (featuring Zedd)	Brittany Hazzard; Stuart Crichton; Anton Zaslavski; Alexander Palmer; Azalea; Jeremy Hawkins; Priscilla Hamilton; Mike Fonseca; Marlon Barrow; Brandon Salaam-Bailey	Iggy Azalea	3:08
14.	"Tribe"	Kevin Anyaeji; Joe Khajadourian; Steph Jones; Louis Prima (Note: "Tribe" interpolates Benny Goodman's recording of "Sing, Sing, Sing (with a Swing)", written and originally recorded by Prima.); Wayne Wilkins; Heidi Rojas; Alex Schwartz	Kim Viera	3:09
15.	"Score Suite from Pitch Perfect 3"	Lennertz	Christopher Lennertz	3:47
16.	"Silent Night" (featuring 80Fitz)	Franz Xaver Gruber; Joseph Mohr	Hana Mae Lee	1:50
17.	"Baby, It's Cold Outside"	Frank Loesser	Kelley Jakle and Shelley Regner	2:52
18.	"Feliz Navidad" (José Feliciano cover)	Feliciano	Chrissie Fit	2:37
19.	"Freedom! '90 x Cups"	Michael; A. P. Carter; Luisa Gerstein; Heloise Tunstall-Behrens (Note: "Cups" is based on Lulu and the Lampshades' arrangement of "When I'm Gone" by the Carter Family.)	The Bellas and The Voice US Season 13 Top 12 Contestants	2:28
Total length:				60:07

Special edition track listing
No.	Title	Writer(s)	Performer	Length
16.	"Bend Over (Stand Up)"	Brayden Deskins; Chief WaKil; Daniel Francis DiPrima; DJ Huggy; DJ Cheapshot; Jason Rabinowitz	Anna Kendrick and Moisés Arias	0:46
17.	"Elle me dit"	Mika; Doriand	Mika	3:39
18.	"All Stars"	Amanda MNDR Warner; Peter Wade; Martin Picandet	Martin Solveig and Alma	2:50
19.	"Came Here for Love"	Bruce Fielder; Ella McMahon; Cédric Steinmyller; Bryn Christopher; Scott Wild	Sigala and Ella Eyre	3:23
20.	"Freedom! '90 x Cups"	Michael; Carter; Gerstein; Tunstall-Behrens	The Bellas and The Voice US Season 13 Top 12 Contestants	2:28
21.	"Don't Speak x Hard for Me to Say I'm Sorry" (mashup of songs by No Doubt and Chicago)	Gwen Stefani; Eric Stefani; Peter Cetera; David Foster	Rebel Wilson and John Lithgow	2:24
22.	"Pitch Perfect Franchise Medley (Cups / Don't You (Forget About Me) / Flashlight / Crazy Youngsters / Sit Still, Look Pretty)" (includes songs by Simple Minds, Jessie J, Ester Dean and Daya)	Carter; Gerstein; Tunstall-Behrens; Keith Forsey; Steve Schiff; Furler; Christian Guzman; Jason Moore; Sam Smith; E. Dean; Deandria Dean; Mason; Sanderson; Barletta; Campbell; Newbill	Todrick Hall	4:05
Total length:				69:55

== Chart performance ==
=== Weekly charts ===
Weekly chart performance for Pitch Perfect 3: Original Motion Picture Soundtrack
Chart (2017–2018)	Peak position
Australian Albums (ARIA)	7
Austrian Albums (Ö3 Austria)	54
Belgian Albums (Ultratop Flanders)	48
Canadian Albums (Billboard)	23
Dutch Albums (Album Top 100)	55
German Albums (Offizielle Top 100)	47
New Zealand Albums (RMNZ)	22
UK Compilation Albums (OCC)	33
UK Album Downloads (OCC)	24
US Billboard 200	20
US Current Album Sales (Billboard)	7
US Soundtrack Albums (Billboard)	2

=== Year-end charts ===
Year-end chart performance for Pitch Perfect 3: Original Motion Picture Soundtrack
Chart (2018)	Position
US Soundtrack Albums (Billboard)	19
