= Caught (2015 film) =

2015 American film

- Promotional poster
- Written by: Marcy Holland
- Directed by: Maggie Kiley
- Starring: Anna Camp; Samuel Page; Stefanie Scott; Amelia Rose Blaire
- Music by: Matthew Puckett
- Country of origin: United States
- Original language: English

Production
- Executive producers: Fernando Szew; Sharon Bordas
- Producer: Jennifer Westin
- Cinematography: Martim Vian
- Editor: Vincent Oresman
- Running time: 82 minutes
- Production companies: MarVista Entertainment; Covert Productions

Original release
- Network: Lifetime
- Release: November 7, 2015

Caught is a 2015 American psychological thriller television film directed by Maggie Kiley, written by Marcy Holland, and starring Anna Camp, Samuel Page, Stefanie Scott and Amelia Rose Blaire.

== Plot ==
Allie has a secret relationship with Justin, who is an older but charming guy. What she does not know is that he is married to Sabrina who, upon discovering the affair enlists her reluctant sister Paige to help kidnap Allie. Intended as a prank, the situation goes out of control as Allie fights for her life.

== Cast ==
- Anna Camp as Sabrina
- Samuel Page as Justin
- Stefanie Scott as Allie
- Mary B. McCann as Beth
- Amelia Rose Blaire as Paige
- Wolfgang Bodison as Coach

== Filming ==
The filming took place in North Carolina, Los Angeles, and Boston.
