= Pitch Perfect 2 (soundtrack) =

Pitch Perfect 2: Original Motion Picture Soundtrack

Soundtrack album by Various artists
- Released: May 12, 2015
- Genres: A capella; pop
- Length: 43:32; 70:38 (Special edition)
- Label: Universal Music

Singles from Pitch Perfect 2
- 1. "Flashlight" Released: April 23, 2015; 2. "Crazy Youngsters" Released: May 10, 2015

Pitch Perfect 2: Original Motion Picture Soundtrack is the soundtrack album to the 2015 musical comedy film Pitch Perfect 2. It was released on May 12, 2015, by Universal Music. Mark Mothersbaugh was hired to compose the music for the film on December 3, 2014. The album was preceded by Flashlight as the lead single, which was initially offered with the album's pre-order, but was made available eventually on April 23, 2015. The special edition was later released on August 8, 2015.

== Singles ==
"Flashlight" by Jessie J was made available on April 23, 2015, as the lead single of the soundtrack album. It debuted on the Billboard Hot 100 chart on 28 May 2015, at number 68. It eventually peaked at number 61. The second single, "Crazy Youngsters", performed by cast member Ester Dean, was released on May 10, 2015, with its music video to further promote the film's release.

== Commercial performance ==
The soundtrack debuted at number one on the Billboard 200, earning 107,000 album-equivalent units (92,000 copies of traditional sales) during its first week. The soundtrack also debuted at number two on the UK Soundtrack Albums Chart, and peaked at number one the next week.

== Track listing ==
| No. | Title | Writer(s) | Performer | Length |
|---|---|---|---|---|
| 1. | "Universal Fanfare" | Jerry Goldsmith; Brian Tyler (Note: 1997–2011 Universal fanfare composed by Goldsmith; 2012 Universal fanfare composed and arranged by Tyler.) | Elizabeth Banks; John Michael Higgins | 0:33 |
| 2. | "Kennedy Center Performance (We Got the World/Timber/America the Beautiful/Wrecking Ball)" (medley of Icona Pop, Pitbull feat. Kesha, traditional and Miley Cyrus songs) | Aino Jawo; Caroline Hjelt; Elof Loelv; Linus Eklöw; Jimmy Koitzsch; Nicole Morier; Tove Nilsson; Kesha Sebert; Lukasz Gottwald; Aaron Davis Arnold; Jamie Sanderson; Henry Walter; Pebe Sebert; Lee Oskar; Keri Oskar; Greg Errico; Steve Arrington; Charles Carter; Waung Hankerson; Roger Parker; Priscilla Hamilton; Breyan Isaac; Armando C. Pérez; Katharine Lee Bates; Samuel A. Ward; Maureen McDonald; Stephan Moccio; Sacha Skarbek; David Kim | The Barden Bellas | 2:27 |
| 3. | "Lollipop" (Mika cover) | Michael Holbrook Penniman Jr. | The Treblemakers | 2:43 |
| 4. | "Car Show (Uprising/Tsunami)" (mashup of songs by Muse and Dvbbs and Borgeous) | Matt Bellamy; Niles Hollowell-Dhar | Das Sound Machine | 1:47 |
| 5. | "Winter Wonderland/Here Comes Santa Claus" (mashup of songs originally recorded by Richard Himber and Gene Autry) | Felix Bernard; Richard Bernhard Smith; Autry; Harriet Melka; Oakley Haldeman | Snoop Dogg; Anna Kendrick | 3:04 |
| 6. | "Riff Off (Thong Song/(Shake, Shake, Shake) Shake Your Booty/Low/Bootylicious/Baby Got Back/Live Like You Were Dying/Before He Cheats/A Thousand Miles/We Are Never Ever Getting Back Together/What's Love Got to Do with It/This Is How We Do It/Doo Wop (That Thing)/Poison/Scenario/Insane in the Brain/Flashlight)" (medley of songs by Sisqó, KC and the Sunshine Band, Flo Rida feat. T-Pain, Destiny's Child, Sir Mix-a-Lot, Tim McGraw, Carrie Underwood, Vanessa Carlton, Taylor Swift, Tina Turner, Montell Jordan, Lauryn Hill, Bell Biv DeVoe, A Tribe Called Quest, Cypress Hill and Jessie J) | Mark Andrews; Tim Kelley; Bob Robinson; Desmond Child; Draco Rosa; Harry Wayne Casey; Richard Finch; Tramar Dillard; Faheem Najm; Montay Humphrey; Charlie Skilling; Beyoncé Knowles; Falonte Moore; Stevie Nicks; Sir Mix-a-Lot; Tim Nichols; Craig Wiseman; Josh Kear; Chris Tompkins; Carlton; Swift; Max Martin; Shellback; Graham Lyle; Terry Britten; Jordan; Oji Pierce; Ricky Walters; L. Hill; Dr. Freeze; Kamaal Fareed; Bryan Higgins; James Jackson; Ali Shaheed Muhammad; Trevor Smith; Malik Taylor; Louis Freese; Lawrence Muggerud; Senen Reyes; Sia Furler; Christian Guzman; Jason Moore; Sam Smith | Das Sound Machine; Tone Hangers; The Barden Bellas; Green Bay Packers; The Treblemakers | 4:24 |
| 7. | "Jump" (Kris Kross cover) | Jermaine Mauldin; Joe Nicolo; Larry Mizell; Alphonso Mizell; Roy Hammond; Berry Gordy; Freddie Perren; Deke Richards; Leroy Bonner; Marshall Jones; Walter Morrison; Ralph Middlebrooks; Bruce Napier; Marvin Pierce; Gregory Webster; Clarence Satchell; Walter Morris; Marvin Pierre; Reyes; Freese; Muggerud; Lowell Fulson; Jimmy McCracklin; James Brown; Anthony Criss; Kier Gist; Vincent Brown; Herb Rooney | Das Sound Machine; Tone Hangers; The Treblemakers; Green Bay Packers | 1:16 |
| 8. | "Convention Performance (Promises/Problem)" (mashup of songs by Nero and Natalia Kills) | Daniel Stephens; Joe Ray; Alana Watson; Kills; Jeff Bhasker; Guillaume Doubet; Sky Montique | The Barden Bellas | 1:41 |
| 9. | "Back to Basics (Boogie Woogie Bugle Boy/You Can't Hurry Love/Lady Marmalade/MMMBop/My Lovin' (You're Never Gonna Get It))" (medley of songs by the Andrews Sisters, the Supremes, Labelle, Hanson and En Vogue) | Don Raye; Hughie Prince; Holland–Dozier–Holland; Bob Crewe; Kenny Nolan; Isaac Hanson; Taylor Hanson; Zac Hanson; Denzil Foster; Thomas McElroy; J. Brown; Fred Wesley; John Starks | The Barden Bellas | 1:30 |
| 10. | "Cups ("When I'm Gone") [Campfire Version]" (based on Lulu and the Lampshades' arrangement of "When I'm Gone" by the Carter Family) | A. P. Carter; Luisa Gerstein; Heloise Tunstall-Behrens | The Barden Bellas | 0:45 |
| 11. | "We Belong" (Pat Benatar cover) | David Eric Lowen; Dan Navarro | Rebel Wilson; Adam DeVine | 3:34 |
| 12. | "Any Way You Want It (World Championship Medley)" (Journey cover) | Steve Perry; Neal Schon | Pentatonix; Filharmonic; The Cantasticos; The Singboks; Penn Masala | 1:56 |
| 13. | "World Championship Finale 1 (My Songs Know What You Did in the Dark (Light Em Up)/All I Do Is Win)" (mashup of songs by Fall Out Boy and DJ Khaled feat. T-Pain, Ludacris, Snoop Dogg and Rick Ross) | Patrick Stump; Pete Wentz; Joe Trohman; Andy Hurley; Butch Walker; John Hill; Christopher Bridges; Calvin Broadus; William Roberts II; Najm; Khaled Khaled; Johnny Mollings; Lenny Mollings | Das Sound Machine | 2:01 |
| 14. | "World Championship Finale 2 (Run the World (Girls)/Where Them Girls At/Lady Marmalade/We Belong/Timber/Flashlight)" (medley of songs by Beyoncé, David Guetta feat. Flo Rida and Nicki Minaj, Labelle, Pat Benatar, Pitbull feat. Kesha and Jessie J) | Knowles; Terius "The-Dream" Nash; David Taylor; Wesley Pentz; Adidja Palmer; Nick van de Wall; Guetta; Dillard; Onika Maraj; Michael Caren; Jared Cotter; Juan Salinas; Oscar Salinas; Giorgio Tuinfort; Sandy Wilhelm; Crewe; Nolan; Lowen; Navarro; K. Sebert; Gottwald; Arnold; Sanderson; Walter; P. Sebert; L. Oskar; K. Oskar; Errico; Arrington; C. Carter; Hankerson; Parker; Hamilton; Isaac; Pérez; Furler; Guzman; J. Moore; S. Smith | The Barden Bellas | 4:16 |
| 15. | "Crazy Youngsters" | E. Dean; Deandria Dean; Harvey Mason Jr.; Sanderson | Ester Dean | 3:39 |
| 16. | "Pitch Perfect 2 End Credit Medley" | Mothersbaugh | Mark Mothersbaugh | 3:00 |
| 17. | "Flashlight" | Furler; Guzman; J. Moore; S. Smith | Jessie J | 3:29 |
| 18. | "All of Me (Bumper's Audition)" (John Legend cover) | John Stephens; Toby Gad | Adam DeVine | 1:27 |
| Total length: | | | | 43:44 |

Special edition
| No. | Title | Writer(s) | Performer | Length |
|---|---|---|---|---|
| 1. | "Universal Fanfare" | Goldsmith; Tyler | Elizabeth Banks; John Michael Higgins | 0:33 |
| 2. | "Kennedy Center Performance (We Got the World/Timber/America The Beautiful/Wrecking Ball)" (medley of Icona Pop, Pitbull feat. Kesha, traditional and Miley Cyrus songs) | Jawo; Hjelt; Loelv; Eklöw; Koitzsch; Morier; Nilsson; K. Sebert; Gottwald; Arnold; Sanderson; Walter; P. Sebert; L. Oskar; K. Oskar; Errico; Arrington; C. Carter; Hankerson; Parker; Hamilton; Isaac; Pérez; Bates; Ward; McDonald; Moccio; Skarbek; Kim | The Barden Bellas | 2:27 |
| 3. | "Bang Bang" | Martin; Savan Kotecha; Rickard Göransson; Maraj | Jessie J; Ariana Grande; Nicki Minaj | 3:19 |
| 4. | "Lollipop" (Mika cover) | Penniman | The Treblemakers | 2:43 |
| 5. | "Change Your Life" | Azalea; Natalie Sims; Raja Kumari; The Messengers; Lovy Longomba; T.I. | Iggy Azalea (feat. T.I.) | 3:41 |
| 6. | "Sunshine" | Joakim Åhlund; Klas Åhlund; Patrik Arve | Teddybears (feat. Malte Holmberg and Natalie Storm) | 3:20 |
| 7. | "Car Show (Uprising/Tsunami)" (mashup of songs by Muse and Dvbbs and Borgeous) | Bellamy; Hollowell-Dhar | Das Sound Machine | 1:47 |
| 8. | "A Different Beat" | Thomas Barnes; Peter Kelleher; Ben Kohn; Iain James; Ayak Thiik; Perrie Edwards; Jesy Nelson; Leigh-Anne Pinnock; Jade Thirlwall | Little Mix | 3:27 |
| 9. | "Winter Wonderland/Here Comes Santa Claus" (mashup of songs originally recorded by Richard Himber and Gene Autry) | Bernard; R.B. Smith; Autry; Melka; Haldeman | Snoop Dogg; Anna Kendrick | 3:04 |
| 10. | "Riff Off (Thong Song/(Shake, Shake, Shake) Shake Your Booty/Low/Bootylicious/Baby Got Back/Live Like You Were Dying/Before He Cheats/A Thousand Miles/We Are Never Ever Getting Back Together/What's Love Got to Do with It/This Is How We Do It/Doo Wop (That Thing)/Poison/Scenario/Insane in the Brain/Flashlight)" (medley of songs by Sisqó, KC and the Sunshine Band, Flo Rida feat. T-Pain, Destiny's Child, Sir Mix-a-Lot, Tim McGraw, Carrie Underwood, Vanessa Carlton, Taylor Swift, Tina Turner, Montell Jordan, Lauryn Hill, Bell Biv DeVoe, A Tribe Called Quest, Cypress Hill and Jessie J) | Andrews; Kelley; Robinson; Child; Rosa; Casey; Finch; Dillard; Najm; Humphrey; Skilling; Knowles; F. Moore; Nicks; Sir Mix-a-Lot; Nichols; Wiseman; Kear; Tompkins; Carlton; Swift; Martin; Shellback; Lyle; Britten; Jordan; O. Pierce; Walters; L. Hill; Dr. Freeze; Fareed; B. Higgins; Jackson; Muhammad; T. Smith; M. Taylor; Freese; Muggerud; Reyes; Furler; Guzman; J. Moore; S. Smith | Das Sound Machine; Tone Hangers; The Barden Bellas; Green Bay Packers; The Treblemakers | 4:24 |
| 11. | "Jump" (Kris Kross cover) | Mauldin; Nicolo; L. Mizell; A. Mizell; Hammond; Gordy; Perren; Richards; Bonner; Jones; Morrison; Middlebrooks; Napier; M. Pierce; Webster; Satchell; Morris; Pierre; Reyes; Freese; Muggerud; Fulson; McCracklin; J. Brown; Criss; Gist; V. Brown; Rooney | Das Sound Machine; Tone Hangers; The Treblemakers; Green Bay Packers | 1:16 |
| 12. | "Convention Performance (Promises/Problem)" (mashup of songs by Nero and Natalia Kills) | D. Stephens; Ray; Jervis; Watson; Kills; Bhasker; Doubet; Montique | The Barden Bellas | 1:41 |
| 13. | "Back to Basics (Boogie Woogie Bugle Boy/You Can't Hurry Love/Lady Marmalade/MMMBop/My Lovin' (You're Never Gonna Get It))" (medley of songs by the Andrews Sisters, the Supremes, Labelle, Hanson and En Vogue) | Raye; Prince; Holland–Dozier–Holland; Crewe; Nolan; I. Hanson; T. Hanson; Z. Hanson; Foster; McElroy; J. Brown; Wesley; Starks | The Barden Bellas | 1:30 |
| 14. | "Cups ("When I'm Gone") [Campfire Version]" (based on Lulu and the Lampshades' arrangement of "When I'm Gone" by the Carter Family) | A. P. Carter; Gerstein; Tunstall-Behrens | The Barden Bellas | 0:45 |
| 15. | "We Belong" (Pat Benatar cover) | Lowen; Navarro | Rebel Wilson; Adam Devine | 3:34 |
| 16. | "Any Way You Want It (World Championship Medley)" (Journey cover) | Perry; Schon | Pentatonix; Filharmonic; The Cantasticos; The Singboks; Penn Masala | 1:56 |
| 17. | "World Championship Finale 1 (My Songs Know What You Did in the Dark (Light Em Up)/All I Do Is Win)" (mashup of songs by Fall Out Boy and DJ Khaled feat. T-Pain, Ludacris, Snoop Dogg and Rick Ross) | Stump; Wentz; Trohman; Hurley; Walker; J. Hill; Bridges; Broadus; Roberts; Najm; Khaled; J. Mollings; L. Mollings | Das Sound Machine | 2:01 |
| 18. | "World Championship Finale 2 (Run the World (Girls)/Where Them Girls At/Lady Marmalade/We Belong/Timber/Flashlight)" (medley of songs by Beyoncé, David Guetta feat. Flo Rida and Nicki Minaj, Labelle, Pat Benatar, Pitbull feat. Kesha and Jessie J) | Knowles; Nash; D. Taylor; Pentz; Palmer; van de Wall; Guetta; Dillard; Maraj; Caren; Cotter; J. Salinas; O. Salinas; Tuinfort; Wilhelm; Crewe; Nolan; Lowen; Navarro; K. Sebert; Gottwald; Arnold; Sanderson; Walter; P. Sebert; L. Oskar; K. Oskar; Errico; Arrington; C. Carter; Hankerson; Parker; Hamilton; Isaac; Pérez; Furler; Guzman; J. Moore; S. Smith | The Barden Bellas | 4:16 |
| 19. | "Crazy Youngsters" | E. Dean; D. Dean; Mason; Sanderson | Ester Dean | 3:39 |
| 20. | "Heartbreak Dream" | Who; Peter Thomas | Betty Who | 3:38 |
| 21. | "Pitch Perfect 2 End Credit Medley" | Mothersbaugh | Mark Mothersbaugh | 3:00 |
| 22. | "Flashlight" | Furler; Guzman; J. Moore; S. Smith | Jessie J | 3:29 |
| 23. | "All of Me (Bumper's Audition)" (John Legend cover) | J. Stephens; Gad | Adam DeVine | 1:27 |
| 24. | "Flashlight (Sweet Life Mix)" | Furler; Guzman; J. Moore; S. Smith | Hailee Steinfeld | 2:58 |
| 25. | "Any Way You Want It" (Journey cover) | Perry; Schon | Pentatonix | 2:30 |
| 26. | "Flashlight (Rebel Mix)" | Furler; Guzman; J. Moore; S. Smith | Jessie J | 3:41 |
| 27. | "Jungle" (X Ambassadors and Jamie N Commons cover) | X Ambassadors; Commons; Alex da Kid; Mike Del Rio | The Barden Bellas | 0:32 |
| Total length: | | | | 70:44 |

Special edition - Target exclusive
| No. | Title | Writer(s) | Performer | Length |
|---|---|---|---|---|
| 28. | "Flashlight (Math Club Remix)" | Furler; Guzman; J. Moore; S. Smith | Hailee Steinfeld | 2:57 |
| 29. | "Locked Out Of Heaven" (Bruno Mars cover) | Mars; Philip Lawrence; Ari Levine | The Treblemakers | 3:50 |

== Charts ==
Weekly charts

| Chart (2015) | Peak position |
|---|---|
| Australian Albums (ARIA) | 3 |
| Austrian Albums (Ö3 Austria) | 11 |
| Belgian Albums (Ultratop Flanders) | 144 |
| Canadian Albums (Billboard) | 3 |
| German Albums (Offizielle Top 100) | 12 |
| New Zealand Albums (RMNZ) | 8 |
| Swiss Albums (Schweizer Hitparade) | 26 |
| Taiwanese Albums (Five Music) | 1 |
| UK Compilation Albums (Official Charts) | 6 |
| UK Soundtrack Albums (OCC) | 1 |
| US Digital Albums (Billboard) | 1 |
| US Billboard 200 | 1 |
| US Soundtrack Albums (Billboard) | 1 |
| US Vinyl Albums (Billboard) | 1 |

Year-end charts

| Chart (2015) | Position |
|---|---|
| Australian Albums (ARIA) | 27 |
| US Billboard 200 | 52 |
| US Billboard 200 | 52 |

| Chart (2016) | Position |
|---|---|
| US Soundtrack Albums (Billboard) | 13 |

== Certifications ==
| Region | Certification | Certified units/sales |
|---|---|---|
| Australia (ARIA) | Gold | 35,000^{^} |
| New Zealand (RMNZ) | 2× Platinum | 30,000^{‡} |
| Singapore (RIAS) | Gold | 5,000^{*} |
| United Kingdom (BPI) | Silver | 60,000^{*} |
^{*} Sales figures based on certification alone.^{^} Shipments figures based on certification alone.^{‡} Sales+streaming figures based on certification alone.
