= Dial a Prayer =

- Directed by: Maggie Kiley
- Written by: Maggie Kiley
- Produced by: Paul Finkel; Dan Hyman; Jason Potash
- Starring: Brittany Snow; Glenne Headly; William H. Macy
- Cinematography: Gavin Kelly
- Edited by: Vincent Oresman
- Music by: Matthew Puckett
- Production companies: Storyboard Entertainment; Compass Entertainment
- Distributed by: Vertical Entertainment
- Release date: April 10, 2015
- Running time: 97 minutes
- Country: United States
- Language: English

Dial a Prayer is a 2015 American comedy-drama film written and directed by Maggie Kiley starring Brittany Snow, Glenne Headly and William H. Macy.

== Plot ==
A troubled young woman working at a prayer call center makes a difference in other people's lives, forcing her to reconcile with her troubled past with the faith she brings out in others.

== Cast ==
- Brittany Snow as Cora
- William H. Macy as Bill
- Tom Lipinski as Chase
- Glenne Headly as Mary
- Kate Flannery as Siobhan
- Stephanie Koenig as Jenn
- Rhonda Freya English as Georgia
- Nicole Forester as Marlene

== Reception ==
On the review aggregator website Rotten Tomatoes, 67% of six critics' reviews are positive, with an average rating of 5.8/10. Tracy Moore of Common Sense Media gave the film three stars out of five.
