= Myra Lucretia Taylor =

American actress (born 1960)

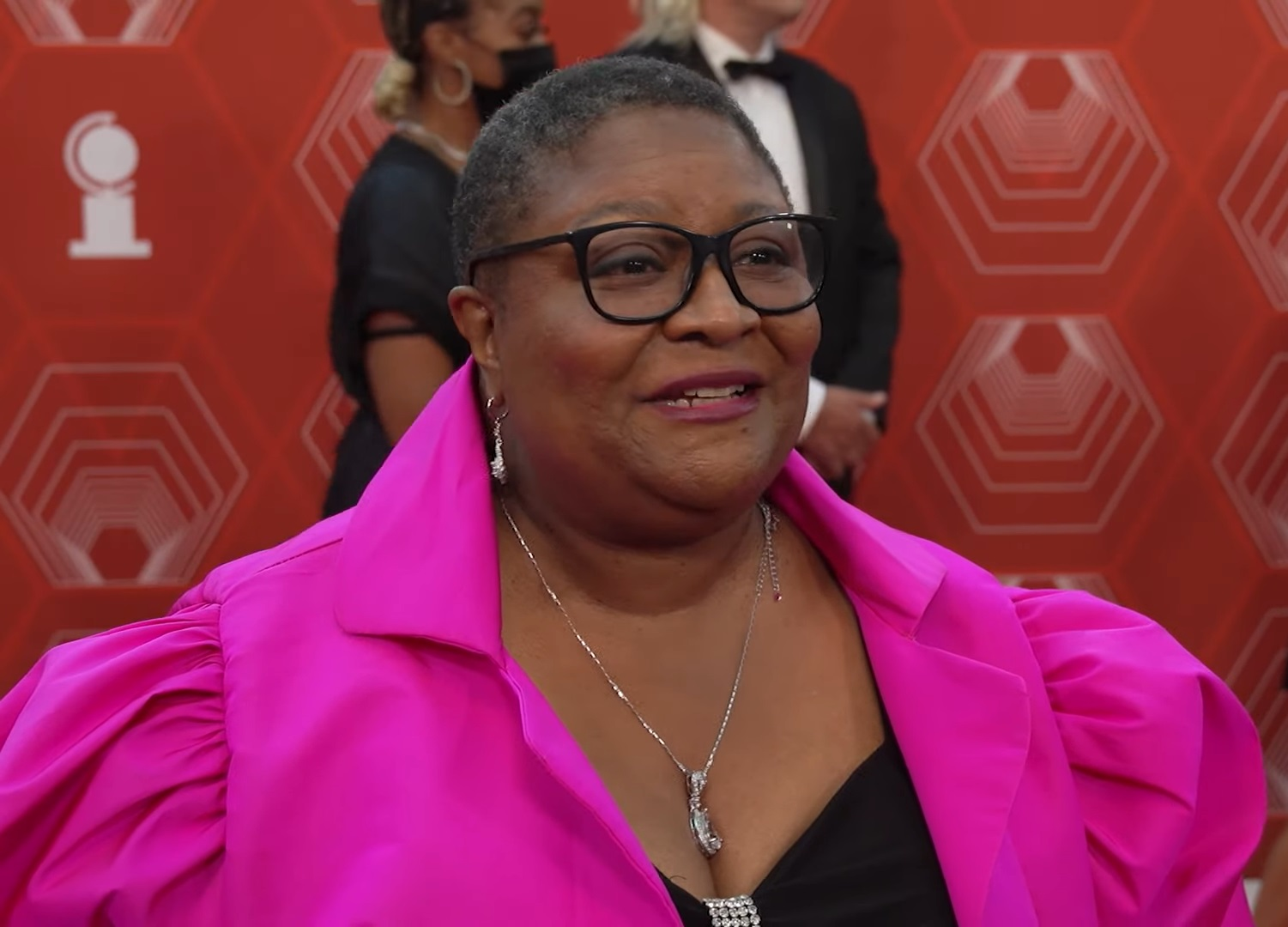
- Taylor at the 2020 Tony Awards
- Born: July 9, 1960 (age 66); Fort Motte, South Carolina, U.S.
- Occupation: Actress
- Years active: 1988–present

Myra Lucretia Taylor (born July 9, 1960) is an American actress and singer. She received Tony Awards nomination for Best Featured Actress in a Musical for her performance as Gran Georgeanna in the Broadway musical Tina (2019). She also received Drama Desk Award and well as Outer Critics Circle Award and Lucille Lortel Awards nominations during her career.

== Life and career ==
Taylor was born in Fort Motte, South Carolina. She made her Broadway debut in the 1988 production of A Streetcar Named Desire. Also that year, she made her screen debut appearing in the comedy film Crossing Delancey. The following years, she appeared in small parts in films such as The Paper (1994), Everyone Says I Love You (1996), and Music of the Heart (1999). Her television credits including Law & Order, Law & Order: Special Victims Unit, Law & Order: Criminal Intent, Girls, Unbreakable Kimmy Schmidt, Hunters, Atlanta and Defending Jacob.

On Broadway, Taylor performed in Mule Bone, Chronicle of a Death Foretold, Electra, Macbeth, Nine, and most notable Tina, receiving Tony Awards nomination for Best Featured Actress in a Musical. She performed in the national tours of South Pacific and Wicked.

== Filmography ==
- Crossing Delancey (1988)
- The Paper (1994)
- Everyone Says I Love You (1996)
- Better Living (1998)
- Music of the Heart (1999)
- Changing Lanes (2002)
- Unfaithful (2002)
- Brooklyn Lobster (2005)
- Life Support (2007)
- Before the Devil Knows You're Dead (2007)
- The Understudy (2008)
- The Private Lives of Pippa Lee (2009)
- Silver Tongues (2011)
- She's Lost Control (2014)
- Custody (2016)
- Catfight (2016)
- The Big Sick (2017)
- Bushwick (2017)
- Unsane (2018)
- Ben Is Back (2018)
- Swallow (2019)
- See You Yesterday (2019)
- The Good Nurse (2022)
- American Fiction (2023)
- Ezra (2023)
