= Time Doesn't Notice =

Studio album by No Address
- Released: April 26, 2005
- Studio: Stepbridge Studios, Rancho Digital, Santa Fe
- Genre: Post-grunge; alternative rock
- Length: 58:00
- Label: Atlantic/WEA
- Producer: John Kurzweg

Singles from Time Doesn't Notice
- 1. "When I'm Gone (Sadie)"

Professional ratings
Review scores
Source	Rating
AllMusic	2.5/5 stars
PunkNews	3.5/5 stars
HipOnline	5/10 stars
Melodic.net	3.5/5 stars

Time Doesn't Notice is the first studio album by American band No Address. The CD contains both regular audio tracks and multimedia files. The track "When I'm Gone (Sadie)" reached No. 12 on the Billboard Mainstream Rock chart in 2005.

== Track listing ==
No.	Title	Lyrics	Music	Length
1.	"Perfect"	Ben Lauren	Ben Lauren, Phil Moreton, Justin Long, Bill Donaldson	3:25
2.	"Love at Your Momentum"	Ben Lauren	Ben Lauren, Justin Long, Bill Donaldson	4:27
3.	"When I'm Gone (Sadie)"	Ben Lauren	Ben Lauren, Phil Moreton, Justin Long, Bill Donaldson	4:11
4.	"Lasting Words"	Ben Lauren	Ben Lauren, Phil Moreton, Justin Long	4:10
5.	"It's Alright"	Ben Lauren	Ben Lauren, Justin Long, Bill Donaldson	5:00
6.	"How Could I?"	Ben Lauren	Ben Lauren, Phil Moreton, Justin Long, Bill Donaldson	3:58
7.	"Mother Sunday"	Ben Lauren	Ben Lauren, Phil Moreton, Justin Long	4:24
8.	"Never Coming Back"	Ben Lauren	Ben Lauren, Phil Moreton, Justin Long	4:23
9.	"Too Proud"	Ben Lauren	Ben Lauren, Justin Long	4:36
10.	"A Step Away"	Ben Lauren	Ben Lauren, Justin Long	4:04
11.	"Time"	Ben Lauren	Ben Lauren, Justin Long	4:40
12.	"Pretty Girl"	Ben Lauren	Ben Lauren, Phil Moreton, Justin Long	4:46
13.	"Walk Away"	Ben Lauren	Ben Lauren, Justin Long	5:56

== Personnel ==
- Ben Lauren: vocals
- Phil Moreton: guitar, background vocals
- Justin Long: guitar
- Bill Donaldson: bass
- Randy Lane: drums
