= The Jed Foundation =

Non-profit organization in the USA

The Jed Foundation (JED)
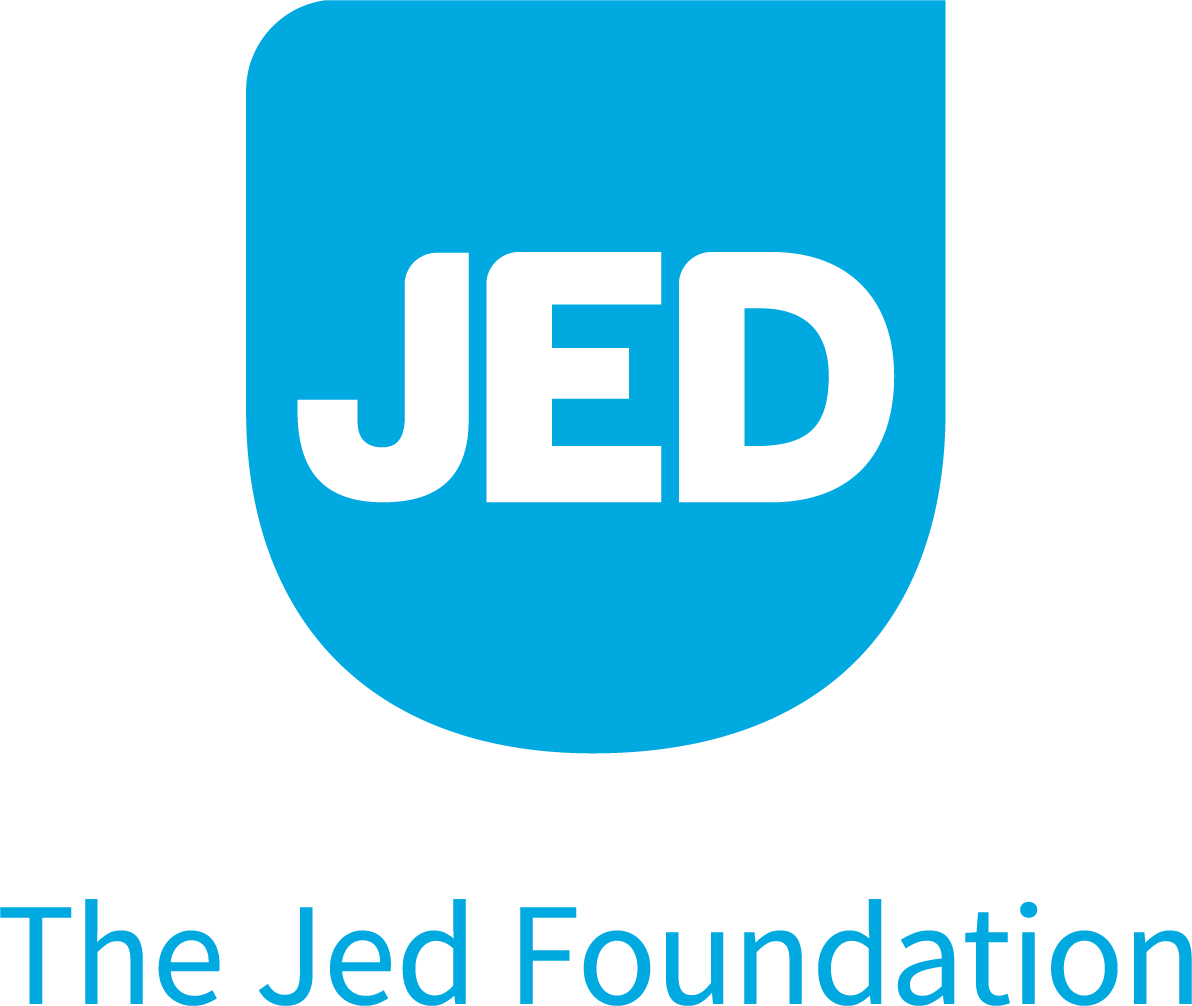
- Founded: 2000; 26 years ago
- Purpose: Suicide prevention, mental illness
- Region served: United States
- Method: Education
- Key people: Phil and Donna Satow
- Website: www.jedfoundation.org

The Jed Foundation (JED) is a non-profit organization that protects emotional health and prevents suicide for teens and young adults in the United States. Phil and Donna Satow started the organization in 2000 after their youngest son Jed died by suicide in college in 1998.

In April 2026, it was announced that The Jed Foundation plans to merge with the American Foundation for Suicide Prevention to further expand upon the goal of suicide prevention.
