= Pitch Perfect (soundtrack) =

Pitch Perfect: Original Motion Picture Soundtrack

Soundtrack album by Various Artists
- Released: September 25, 2012
- Genres: A cappella; pop
- Length: 30:50
- Label: Universal Music

Singles from Pitch Perfect: Original Motion Picture Soundtrack
- 1. "Cups" Released: March 26, 2013

Pitch Perfect: Original Motion Picture Soundtrack is the official music for the 2012 film Pitch Perfect. The soundtrack was released digitally on September 25, 2012, and physically on October 2, 2012. Three songs from the album charted on the Billboard Hot 100: "Cups" by Anna Kendrick, which peaked at number 6; "Bellas Finals" by the Barden Bellas, which peaked at number 85; and "Riff Off" by the Barden Bellas, the Treblemakers, and the BU Harmonics, which peaked at number 86.

The album was the sixth best-selling soundtrack of 2012, with 212,000 copies sold for the year. The album also became the best-selling soundtrack of 2013 in the United States, with 793,000 copies sold in 2013. As of April 2015, the album has sold a total of 1.2 million copies in the US.

== Release and singles ==
The EP version of the Original Motion Picture Soundtrack was released on December 18, 2012, in iTunes and physically as a Target exclusive. The EP contains four tracks that are performed by other rival groups of the Barden Bellas and the Treblemakers.

More from Pitch Perfect was released on June 4, 2013. It contains eight tracks that are featured in the film, as well as the pop version of "Cups." The Anna Kendrick & Brittany Snow duet of "Titanium" was not included on the soundtrack and is only available in the film.

The Ultimate Edition version of the Original Motion Picture Soundtrack was released on February 10, 2015, to coincide with the release of Pitch Perfect 2. It contains all 24 tracks from the previous three releases (Original, Special Edition, and More From).

A remixed and longer version of "Cups" by Kendrick was released to radio on March 26, 2013, and was later used as a theme song for the 2013 CONCACAF Gold Cup football tournament. In August 2013, the song peaked at number six on the Billboard Hot 100.

== Track listings ==
No.	Title	Writer(s)	Performer	Length
1.	"Don't Stop the Music" (Rihanna cover)	Michael Jackson; Mikkel Eriksen; Tor Hermansen; Tawanna Dabney	The Treblemakers	3:06
2.	"Let It Whip" (Dazz Band cover)	Reggie Andrews; Leon Chancler	The Treblemakers	2:25
3.	"Since U Been Gone" (Kelly Clarkson cover)	Max Martin; Lukasz Gottwald	Ester Dean; Skylar Astin	2:27
4.	"Cups" (based on Lulu and the Lampshades' arrangement of "When I'm Gone" by the Carter Family)	A. P. Carter; Luisa Gerstein; Heloise Tunstall-Behrens	Anna Kendrick	1:17
5.	"Riff Off: Ladies of the '80s (Mickey/Like a Virgin/Hit Me with Your Best Shot/It Must Have Been Love), Songs About Sex (S&M/Let's Talk About Sex/I'll Make Love to You/Feels Like the First Time/No Diggity)" (medley of songs by Racey (popularized by Toni Basil), Madonna, Pat Benatar, Roxette, Rihanna, Salt-N-Pepa, Boyz II Men, Foreigner and Blackstreet feat. Dr. Dre and Queen Pen)	Mike Chapman; Nicky Chinn; Billy Steinberg; Tom Kelly; Eddie Schwartz; Ester Dean; Eriksen; Hermansen; Sandy Wilhelm; Hurby Azor; Al Bell; Kenneth Edmonds; Mick Jones; Andre Young; Chauncey Hannibal; Teddy Riley; William Stewart; Lynise Walters; Richard Vick; Bill Withers	The Barden Bellas; The Treblemakers; The BU Harmonics	3:45
6.	"Bellas Regionals: The Sign/Eternal Flame/Turn the Beat Around" (medley of songs by Ace of Base, the Bangles and Vicki Sue Robinson)	Jonas Berggren; Susanna Hoffs; Tom Kelly; Billy Steinberg; Gerald Jackson; Peter Jackson	The Barden Bellas	2:40
7.	"Right Round" (Flo Rida feat. Kesha cover)	Tramar Dillard; Peter Hernandez; Gottwald; Justin Franks; Philip Lawrence; Allan Grigg; Aaron Bay-Schuck; Pete Burns; Wayne Hussey; Mike Percy; Tim Lever; Steve Coy	The Treblemakers (featuring My Name Is Kay)	3:18
8.	"Pool Mashup: Just the Way You Are/Just a Dream" (mashup of songs by Bruno Mars and Nelly)	Hernandez; Philip Lawrence; Ari Levine; Khalil Walton; Khari Cain; Cornell Haynes; Richard Butler; Jim Jonsin; Frank Romano	The Barden Bellas	1:39
9.	"Party in the U.S.A." (Miley Cyrus cover)	Jessica Cornish; Gottwald; Claude Kelly	The Barden Bellas	1:04
10.	"Trebles Finals: Bright Lights Bigger City/Magic" (medley of songs by CeeLo Green and B.o.B feat. Rivers Cuomo)	Thomas Callaway; Ben H. Allen III; Tony Reyes; Bobby Simmons; Cuomo	The Treblemakers	2:34
11.	"Bellas Finals: Price Tag/Don't You (Forget About Me)/Give Me Everything" (medley of songs by Jessie J feat. B.o.B, Simple Minds and Pitbull feat. Ne-Yo, Afrojack and Nayer)	Cornish; Simmons; Gottwald; Claude Kelly; Keith Forsey; Steve Schiff; Armando Perez; Shaffer Smith; Nick van der Wall; Hernandez; Philip Lawrence; Ari Levine; Khalil Walton; Khari Cain; Gerald Jackson; Peter Jackson	The Barden Bellas	3:39
12.	"Toner (Instrumental Suite)"	Beck; Kilian	Christophe Beck; Mark Kilian	2:56
Total length:				30:50

Pitch Perfect: Original Motion Picture Soundtrack – iTunes Store deluxe edition and Target exclusive (bonus tracks)
No.	Title	Writer(s)	Performer	Length
13.	"Fuck You" (Lily Allen cover)	Allen; Greg Kurstin	The Sockapellas	1:12
14.	"Blame It on the Boogie" (Mick Jackson/The Jacksons cover)	Mick Jackson; Dave Jackson; Elmar Krohn	The Footnotes	0:52
15.	"The Final Countdown" (Europe cover)	Joey Tempest	Hullabahoos	1:15
16.	"Open Season"	Jackson Milas; Oli Chang	High Highs	3:49
Total length:				37:58

=== More from Pitch Perfect ===
No.	Title	Writer(s)	Performer	Length
1.	"Cups (Pitch Perfect's "When I'm Gone") (Pop Version)"	Carter; Gerstein; Tunstall-Behrens	Anna Kendrick	2:08
2.	"212 (by Azealia Banks featuring Lazy Jay) vs. Bust A Move (by Young MC)"	Banks; Jef Martens; Marvin Young; Matt Dike; Michael Ross	The Outfit	1:27
3.	"Bulletproof (by La Roux) vs. Release Me (by Agnes)"	Elly Jackson; Ben Langmaid; Agnes Carlsson; Anders Hansson; Sharon Vaughn	The Outfit	3:16
4.	"Starships (Clean)"	Onika Maraj; Nadir Khayat; Carl Falk; Rami Yacoub; Wayne Hector	Nicki Minaj	3:31
5.	"We Came to Smash (In a Black Tuxedo)"	Solveig; Dev; Julien Jabre	Martin Solveig feat. Dev	3:24
6.	"Keep Your Head Up"	Grammer	Andy Grammer	3:09
7.	"Rome"	Yeasayer	Yeasayer	3:51
8.	"Before We Fall in Love"		Damato	2:48
Total length:				61:34

== Charts ==
=== Weekly charts ===
Chart (2012–13)	Peak position
Australian Albums (ARIA)	9
Austrian Albums (Ö3 Austria)	16
Belgian Albums (Ultratop Flanders)	72
Canadian Albums (Billboard)	15
German Albums (Offizielle Top 100)	52
New Zealand Albums (RMNZ)	14
Swiss Albums (Schweizer Hitparade)	72
UK Compilation (OCC)	10
UK Soundtrack Albums (OCC)	1
US Billboard 200	3
US Soundtrack Albums (Billboard)	1

=== Year-end charts ===
Chart (2012)	Position
US Soundtrack Albums (Billboard)	22
Chart (2013)	Position
Australian Albums (ARIA)	29
US Billboard 200	20
US Soundtrack Albums (Billboard)	1
Chart (2015)	Position
Australian Albums (ARIA)	73
US Soundtrack Albums (Billboard)	12

=== Decade-end charts ===
Chart (2010–2019)	Position
US Billboard 200	88

== Certifications ==
Region	Certification	Certified units/sales
Australia (ARIA)	Platinum	70,000^{^}
Germany (BVMI)	Gold	100,000^{‡}
New Zealand (RMNZ)	Platinum	15,000^{‡}
New Zealand (RMNZ) More From Pitch Perfect	Gold	7,500^{‡}
United Kingdom (BPI)	Gold	100,000^{*}
United States (RIAA)	2× Platinum	2,000,000^{‡}
^{*} Sales figures based on certification alone.^{^} Shipments figures based on certification alone.^{‡} Sales+streaming figures based on certification alone.

=== Singles ===
Single	Peak positions							Sales
Single	US	AUS	AUT	CAN	GER	IRE	UK	Sales
"Cups"	6	44	75	12	—	26	71	US: 2,500,000; AUS: 70,000
"Bellas Finals"	85	57	62	71	92	—	184	
"Riff Off"	86	72	70	98	—	—	172	
"Pool Mashup"	111	—	—	—	—	—	—	
"—" denotes a recording that did not chart.
