= High Highs =

Australian indie rock band

- High Highs performing live at CMJ in New York.

Background information
- Origin: Sydney, Australia
- Genres: Indie rock, pop rock, folk rock
- Years active: 2010–present
- Labels: Fine Time/Sony, Rocket Records, [PIAS]
- Members: Jack Milas; Oli Chang; tour members: Sean Hutchinson
- Website: www.highhighs.com

High Highs are an indie rock band from Sydney, Australia, formed by Jack Milas and Oli Chang in 2010.

== History ==
In October 2011, the group released their first, eponymous EP through Small Plates Records/Rocket Music. In January 2013, High Highs released their debut album "Open Season" via Fine Time/Sony Music. The band toured extensively in support of the album, playing the Laneway Festival Australia in January 2013, and toured throughout the US with Vampire Weekend, Sky Ferreira, How To Dress Well, Stars and Oh Land. On May 30/31, 2013, High Highs joined Empire of the Sun for two nights at the Sydney Opera House as part of VIVID Festival.

The band's music has been featured in various films and advertisements. Their song "Open Season" featured in major commercials for Amazon Kindle and Pacífico Beer. It also featured in the 2012 comedy film Pitch Perfect, as well as the 2015 romantic comedy Sleeping With Other People. will.i.am sampled "Flowers Bloom" for his song "Good Morning".

Their second album, entitled "Cascades" was released on February 5, 2016.

Since 2017, Jack Milas and Oli Chang have been releasing solo songs, both announced on High Highs' social media profiles. In October, they said they'd work on their solo projects alongside the band.

== Band members ==
- Jack Milas (2010–present)
- Oli Chang (2010–present)
- Sean Hutchinson (touring) (2010–present)

== Discography ==
=== Albums ===
Title	Album details
Open Season	Released: January 29, 2013; Label: Fine Time/Sony; Formats: CD, LP, Digital download

Title	Album details
Cascades	Released: February 5, 2016; Formats: CD, LP, Digital download

=== EPs ===
Title	Album details
High Highs	Released: October 4, 2011; Label: Fine Time!, Rocket Records; Formats: CD, LP, Digital download

=== Singles ===
- "Open Season" (2010)
- "A Real Hero" (College & Electric Youth cover) (September 13, 2013)
- "St. Marie" (2017)
