= When I'm Gone (Carter Family song) =

1931 song by Carter Family

"When I'm Gone" also commonly known by its longer title "You're Gonna Miss Me When I'm Gone", is a popular song recorded in 1931 by the Carter Family and credited at the time to A. P. Carter (not to be confused with their 1928 song "Will You Miss Me When I’m Gone?").

== Versions ==
The song was later recorded by J. E. Mainer's Mountaineers and by Charlie Monroe.

== Adaptations ==
- In 2009, the band Lulu and the Lampshades combined the song "When I'm Gone" with a common children's game known as the cup game, in which cups are tapped and hit on a table to create a distinct rhythm. This created the modern version of the song known as "Cups (When I'm Gone)" or alternately "When I'm Gone (Cups)".
- In 2011, Anna Burden uploaded a version of the song on YouTube that went viral.
- In 2012, the film Pitch Perfect included a rendition of the song sung by Anna Kendrick, based on Burden's version. Kendrick's version was released on the film's soundtrack and in 2013 became a charting hit in the United States, as well as on other charts. It also served as the official song of the 2013 CONCACAF Gold Cup.
