= Cups (song) =

2013 single by Anna Kendrick

Single by Anna Kendrick

from the album More from Pitch Perfect
- Released: March 26, 2013
- Genre: Americana; folk; folk-pop; pop
- Length: 2:07
- Label: Republic; UME
- Songwriters: A. P. Carter; Luisa Gerstein; Heloise Tunstall-Behrens
- Producers: Jason Moore; Ali Dee Theodore; The Underdogs; Julia Michaels; Julianne Jordan; Jordan Yeager

Music video
- "Cups (Pitch Perfect's 'When I'm Gone')" on YouTube

"Cups" (Note: Alternatively titled "Cups (When I'm Gone)" or "Cups (Pitch Perfect's 'When I'm Gone')") is a song by the American actress and singer Anna Kendrick performed in the 2012 musical comedy film Pitch Perfect. It was later released as part of the Pitch Perfect soundtrack. The song is based on the 1931 folk song "When I'm Gone" by the Carter Family. In the late 2000s, British musicians Heloise Tunstall-Behrens and Luisa Gerstein, performing as Lulu and the Lampshades, reworked "When I'm Gone" and incorporated it into a cup-tapping routine.

In Pitch Perfect, Kendrick's performance features a children's clapping game known as the cup game and uses coordinated tapping, clapping, and cup-passing as percussion. Republic Records and Universal Music Enterprises released a remix titled "Cups (Pitch Perfect's 'When I'm Gone')" as a single on March 26, 2013. It was accompanied by a music video directed by Jason Moore on April 12, 2013; in the video, Kendrick appears as a waitress in a diner, imagining customers and staff around her joining in the cup-clapping routine.

"Cups" received many positive reviews from music critics, who highlighted Kendrick's performance and praised the use of cup-based percussion. The track peaked at number six on the US Billboard Hot 100, giving Kendrick her first top-10 single in the United States, and was certified triple platinum by the Recording Industry Association of America (RIAA). It also reached the top 30 in Canada, Ireland, Hungary, New Zealand, the Netherlands, and the Belgian Ultratop Flanders chart. It was nominated for Choice Music Single: Female at the 2013 Teen Choice Awards.

== Background ==
=== Earlier songs ===
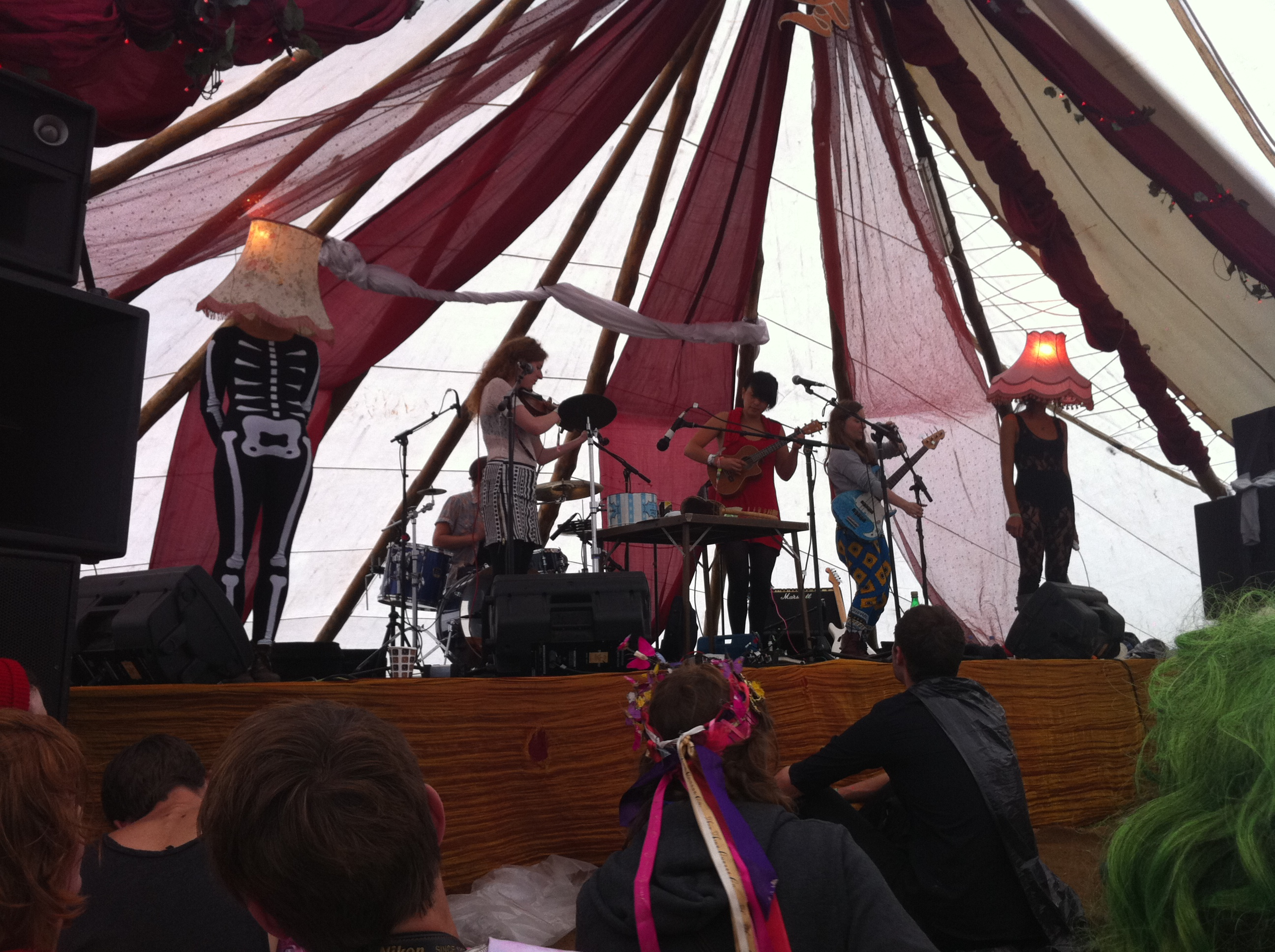
British group Lulu and the Lampshades (pictured in 2010) were the first to use the cup game as percussion when performing the song.

"Cups" borrows lyrics from the Carter Family's 1931 song "When I'm Gone". They were a traditional folk and country group from Virginia consisting of A. P. Carter, his wife Sara Carter, and his sister-in-law Maybelle Carter, who helped make folk and Appalachian music popular between the 1920s and 1950s. Written by A. P. Carter, "When I'm Gone" concerns the subject of death.

British musicians Heloise Tunstall-Behrens and Luisa Gerstein, who performed as Lulu and the Lampshades, reworked the Carter Family's version and used the cup game as percussion. (Note: The cup game is a children's clapping game that involves tapping and hitting a cup using a defined rhythm.) In 2009, Lulu and the Lampshades' cover was uploaded to YouTube with the title "You're Gonna Miss Me"; Anna Burden covered this version in 2011 and also uploaded it to YouTube. Burden's video went viral after being shared on Reddit, leading other singers to record their own versions using the cup-clapping routine.

=== Development and Pitch Perfect ===
American actress Anna Kendrick discovered "Cups" after watching Burden's cover on Reddit and learned the percussion routine. She began her career as a child performer on Broadway, earning a Tony Awards nomination at age twelve for her role in the 1998 musical High Society. She made her featured film debut in the 2003 musical comedy Camp. After first appearing in The Twilight Saga (2008–2012), Kendrick earned an Academy Award nomination for Up in the Air (2009) and co-starred in the comedy-drama 50/50 (2011).

In 2011, when approached for the American musical comedy film Pitch Perfect (2012), Kendrick was initially hesitant to join; she feared the premise would be trite and dismissed by audiences as an uninspired imitation of the musical television series Glee. However, reading Kay Cannon's script convinced her to join. In Pitch Perfect's original script, Kendrick's character, Beca Mitchell, performs the 1939 nursery rhyme "I'm a Little Teapot" during her audition for the fictional a cappella vocal group the Barden Bellas. When director Jason Moore and the producers asked Kendrick to demonstrate her singing prior to filming, she performed "Cups" instead. Moore and the producers were impressed and replaced "I'm a Little Teapot" with "Cups", featuring Kendrick using a plastic cup to create the track's rhythm.

== Release and promotion ==
Kendrick recorded an a cappella cover version titled "Cups (Movie Version)" for the Pitch Perfect soundtrack. Following the release of Pitch Perfect in theaters and home media, the cup routine went viral on social media. In response, Republic Records and Universal Music Enterprises brought Kendrick into the studio and recorded a new version in about 20 minutes. They released a remix of Kendrick's new version with new instrumentation, titled "Cups (Pitch Perfect's 'When I'm Gone')", as a single for US contemporary hit radio on March 26, 2013, and again on April 22, 2013. It was then added as the first track on Pitch Perfect's second soundtrack More from Pitch Perfect. The remix was released as a single in the United Kingdom on October 28, 2013. It became the theme for the 2013 CONCACAF Gold Cup competition.

Kendrick performed the song on Late Show with David Letterman, Saturday Night Live, and The Tonight Show Starring Jimmy Fallon in 2012, 2014, and 2017, respectively. It was included in the 2015 sequel film Pitch Perfect 2, in which the Barden Bellas perform the song as a ballad. This version was included on Pitch Perfect 2's soundtrack with the title "Cups (When I'm Gone) [Campfire Version]". A mashup with George Michael's song "Freedom! '90", titled "Freedom! '90 x Cups", was released on November 21, 2017. The accompanying music video was released on the same day; it includes the cast of Pitch Perfect 3 and the top-12 contestants of the 13th season of The Voice. The track was released on the Pitch Perfect 3 soundtrack.

== Composition ==
"Cups" is an upbeat folk, folk-pop, pop, and Americana track. The a cappella version features only Kendrick's vocals and a plastic cup for percussion, and runs at one minute and 17 seconds. The remix features Kendrick's alto vocals, a bridge, a folk-pop string arrangement, percussion, new instrumentation such as guitar, banjo and xylophone, and a longer runtime of two minutes. The latter was produced by Moore, Julia Michaels, Julianne Jordan, Jordan Yeager, Ali Dee Theodore, and The Underdogs. The song's lyrics explore love, desire, and loss, as Kendrick depicts a narrator informing a companion that she is preparing to leave her hometown with "two bottles of whiskey for the way" to travel the world and enjoy nature, encouraging them to join her while expressing loneliness at the prospect of traveling without them. In the chorus, she sings "You're gonna miss me when I'm gone".

== Reception and accolades ==
Professional ratings
Review scores
Source	Rating
Common Sense Media	4/5 stars

Critical reception for "Cups" centered on the contrast between Kendrick's performance in the film and the remix. Reviewing the soundtrack for AllMusic, Heather Phares described the track as "charming", noting that it was successful "regardless of whether she's assisted by plastic cup percussion or a top 40-friendly production". Angela Zimmerman for Common Sense Media referred to it as an "endearing sing-along song" that balances "the bucolic sweetness" of "When I'm Gone" with a "contemporary pep and radio-ready shine". Houston Chronicle's Joey Guerra lauded the remix and wrote Kendrick's "plaintive delivery makes it easy to love".

In contrast, some critics felt the production of the remix detracted from the original's appeal. Stacy Lambe for Entertainment Tonight stated while the track became successful because of the remake, she preferred the original. Slate's Chris Molanphy said the remix "neutered" the original version of "Cups" and said he would rather listen to Kendrick's "weird-America ditty" version. Writing for Billboard, Andrew Unterberger praised the original track, describing it as "totally charming", but labeled the remix as "mumfordized" and "needlessly extended", saying it "still hits one hell of a flat note".

Commentators also examined the appeal of the cup routine. Fuse's Jeff Benjamin found the song "undeniably catchy" and Kendrick's audition scene an "awesome musical movie moment". In the view of Kelly Lawler from USA Today, Kendrick's rendition in Pitch Perfect is "cute and all" but "really not all that special". However, she commended Kendrick's "spontaneous performance" of the song on Late Show with David Letterman. Writing for SlashFilm, Michael Boyle noted its near-universal popularity with fans, attributing its viral momentum to a youth fad for cup tapping and widespread viral covers on social media. Jacob Uitti for American Songwriter called it a "jaunty offering" that showcases Kendrick's "powerful voice and her ability to make rhythms out of anything".

"Cups" appeared on several critical rankings and received an award nomination. Douglas Wolk of Time placed the song at number nine on his end-of-year list of 2013, describing Kendrick's version as a "terrific arrangement". Bustle featured it on a year-end list of songs from that year, with Kelsea Stahler calling it a "fun, little song". Allie Fick of Girls' Life included the song on her list of notable songs of summer 2013, commenting on its lasting familiarity with listeners. Marcus Jones of Entertainment Weekly placed "Cups" at number nine on his list The Best Songs From Movies of the 2010s. "Cups" was nominated for Choice Music Single: Female at the 2013 Teen Choice Awards.

== Commercial performance ==
"Cups" was a sleeper hit in the United States. It debuted at number 93 on the January 12, 2013, issue of the US Billboard Hot 100, and climbed to number 36 after the remixed version received airplay. The single reached number 10 in its 28th charting week, giving Kendrick her first top-10 chart hit. It peaked at number six on the August 16, 2013, chart. One of the shortest songs to reach the top 10 during the 2010s, it spent 44 weeks on the Hot 100. The track ranked at number 21 on the 2013 year-end chart.

"Cups" performed well on Billboard's airplay charts. It debuted at number 40 on the US Mainstream Top 40, a chart focusing on mainstream radio airplay. The track later reached the number eight spot. "Cups" peaked at number two on the Adult Top 40 chart. It was a number-one hit on the Adult Contemporary chart, becoming Kendrick's first song to top any Billboard chart. By October 2013, "Cups" had sold 2.5 million downloads in the US. The Recording Industry Association of America (RIAA) certified the single triple platinum, denoting track-equivalent sales and streams of three million units in the US.

The single was an international hit; it peaked at number 12 on the Canadian Hot 100, on which it stayed for 42 weeks, and at number 11 on the Belgian Ultratop Flanders chart. It reached the top 30 in New Zealand, Ireland, Hungary, and the Netherlands. Furthermore, it landed a place in the top 80 in the UK, Australia, and Austria. By September 2013, the track had sold over 46,000 copies in the UK. It was certified double platinum by the Pro-Música Brasil (PMB) and Recorded Music NZ (RMNZ).

== Music video ==
Following the song's popularity, Universal Music approached Kendrick to create a music video, whose development began in March 2013. It was directed by Moore and choreographed by Aakomon Jones. The video was shot in one extended long take, interrupted by one or two cuts. During an interview with Entertainment Tonight, Kendrick said that while she wanted to film the music video, she was not keen to make a solo album. She agreed to the music video mostly because she wanted to work with Moore again and because she liked the idea of an entire diner full of people playing the track. An open casting call for the video drew over 300 participants, who auditioned their own interpretations of "Cups". The music supervisor provided a metronome to prevent Kendrick from speeding up the tempo when under pressure while she performed the cup rhythm. Kendrick noted that she was not playing Beca Mitchell in the video and that it was unrelated to Pitch Perfect. The director's cut of the video was released on April 12, 2013, via Kendrick's Vevo YouTube channel.

A still from the music video, showing people in a bar and Kendrick, dressed as a waitress, performing the cup-tapping routine

The clip begins with Kendrick, as a server, standing in a kitchen in a diner cutting biscuits using a cup. She looks at vacation posters and begins to fantasize about quitting her job to travel. She then takes the cup and starts to tap it on the table and clap the song's rhythm. The chef begins tapping an accompaniment with chopsticks before Kendrick walks into the dining area. As she serves the customers and interacts with the diner staff, she sings the track and imagines the customers and staff drumming cups on their tables. Kendrick returns to the kitchen where she is preparing biscuits. She drums on the cup and sings until a timer rings. Kendrick looks back toward the dining area and leaves through the diner's back door.

Writing for Entertainment Weekly, Grady Smith described the video as a "beautifully shot clip", opining it was "choreographed impressively". In a review for IndieWire, Erin Whitney deemed the video "cute" and "fun", suggesting it would help launch the music career of Kendrick. Maahi Shah for Cosmopolitan India called the video "captivat[ing]" and stated it "went far and beyond". Dennis Perkins of The A.V. Club labeled it as "nice", while Kevin Fallon of The Daily Beast called it "adorable". The Wall Street Journal's Alexandra Cheney lauded Kendrick's performance, writing that she gave a "whole new meaning to flip cup", and described the flip cup scene as one of "epic proportion". Jessica Chou of The Daily Meal stated she was "pretty stoked" when she saw Kendrick in the video.

== Credits and personnel ==
Credits are adapted from Tidal and Apple Music.

- Anna Kendrick – vocals
- Jason Moore – production
- The Underdogs – production, mixing engineer, vocal production, vocal arranger
- Ali Dee Theodore – production, vocal production, vocal arranger
- Julia Michaels – production
- Julianne Jordan – production
- Jordan Yeager – production
- A. P. Carter – songwriter
- Heloise Tunstall-Behrens – songwriter
- Luisa Gerstein – songwriter
- Andrew Hey – mixing engineer, vocal recording engineer
- Joseph Magee – mixing engineer, vocal recording engineer
- Deke Sharon – vocal production, vocal arranger
- Tom Kitt – vocal production, vocal arranger
- Ed Boyer – vocal production, vocal arranger

== Charts ==
=== Weekly charts ===
Chart (2013–2014)	Peak position
Australia (ARIA)	44
Austria (Ö3 Austria Top 40)	75
Belgium (Ultratop Flanders)	11
Belgium (Ultratip Wallonia)	2
Canada (Canadian Hot 100)	12
Canada AC (Billboard)	2
Canada CHR/Top 40 (Billboard)	32
Canada Hot AC (Billboard)	13
France (SNEP)	181
Hungary (Single Top 40)	24
Ireland (IRMA)	26
Netherlands (Dutch Top 40)	11
Netherlands (Single Top 100)	14
New Zealand (Recorded Music NZ)	26
UK Singles (Official Charts)	71
US Billboard Hot 100	6
US Adult Contemporary (Billboard)	1
US Adult Top 40 (Billboard)	2
US Mainstream Top 40 (Billboard)	8

=== Year-end charts ===
Chart (2013)	Position
Canada (Canadian Hot 100)	39
Belgium (Ultratop 50 Flanders)	67
Netherlands (Dutch Top 40)	48
Netherlands (Mega Single Top 100)	8
US Billboard Hot 100	21
US Adult Contemporary (Billboard)	11
US Adult Top 40 (Billboard)	13
US Mainstream Top 40 (Billboard)	42

Chart (2014)	Position
US Adult Contemporary (Billboard)	48

== Certifications ==
Certifications and sales
Region	Certification	Certified units/sales
Australia (ARIA)	Platinum	70,000^{^}
Brazil (Pro-Música Brasil)	2× Platinum	120,000^{‡}
Germany (BVMI)	Gold	150,000^{‡}
New Zealand (RMNZ)	2× Platinum	60,000^{‡}
United Kingdom (BPI)	Platinum	600,000^{‡}
United States (RIAA)	3× Platinum	3,000,000^{‡}
^{^} Shipments figures based on certification alone.^{‡} Sales+streaming figures based on certification alone.

== Release history ==
Region	Date	Format	Label(s)	Ref.
United States	March 26, 2013	Contemporary hit radio	Republic; UME	
United States	April 22, 2013	Contemporary hit radio	Republic; UME	
United Kingdom	October 28, 2013	Digital download; streaming	Republic; UME	

== Cover versions ==
Kendrick's version of "Cups" has been widely covered. In 2013, the South Korean girl group Spica released a cappella versions in English and Korean, while singer Paula Rojo covered the song in Spanish. In 2014, Miss New York Kira Kazantsev performed Pharrell Williams' 2014 single "Happy" and used Kendrick's cup routine during the talent portion of the Miss America Pageant.

In March 2016, Indian actress Mithila Palkar released a version in which she sings the Marathi song "Hi Chaal Turu Turu" to the track's rhythm. During an October 2016 interview with MTV, American actor Ben Affleck sang "Cups" for Kendrick. In May 2020, Pakistani film-and-television actor Hania Amir covered the song; according to a staff writer of The Express Tribune, Amir played a golden cup "effortlessly" as a percussion instrument. The writer called Amir's performance a "calm and decent version" of the song.
