= Landshapes =

British band

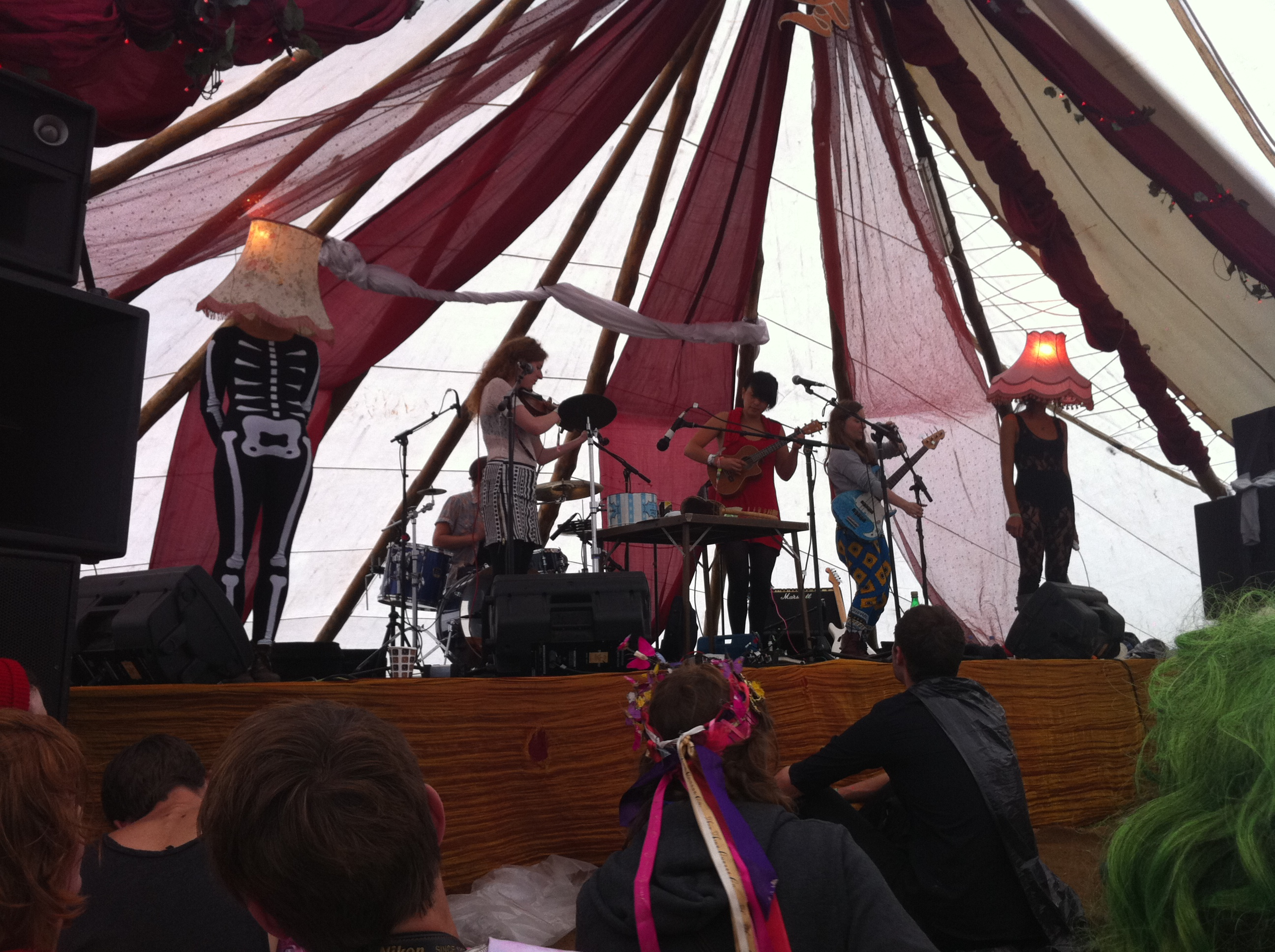
- Lulu and the Lampshades, Bestival 2010; left to right (without the "Lampshades"): Dan Blackett (drums, hidden), Heloise Tunstall-Behrens (violin), Luisa Gerstein (ukulele), Jemma Freeman (electric guitar)

Background information
- Origin: Bristol, England

Landshapes are a British band known primarily for their effects-heavy psychedelic alternative rock.

The group consists of Heloise Tunstall-Behrens (vocals, violin) and Luisa Gerstein (vocals, ukulele) with Jemma Freeman (guitar, vocals) and Dan Blackett (drums, vocals). The band members first met as students at the University of Bristol. The band formed in 2009 as Lulu and the Lampshades. After shortening their name, they released their debut full-length album Rambutan on indie record label Bella Union in 2013 and their second album, Heyoon, in May 2015.

Band members Tunstall-Behrens and Gerstein are known for their revival of the 1931 Carter Family song "When I'm Gone" as "Cups".

While Landshapes was on hiatus, Gerstein and Tunstall-Behrens remained active with Deep Throat Choir, releasing an album on Bella Union in 2017, and now perform with Blood Moon Project. Freeman formed Jemma Freeman and the Cosmic Something, releasing a debut EP in 2017 and a debut album in 2019.

== Discography ==
Lulu and the Lampshades

- 2009: "Feet To The Sky" / "Rose Tint" (Single, Voga Parochia)
- 2011: "Cold Water" / "Cups" ("You're Gonna Miss Me") (Single, Moshi Moshi)
- 2011: "Cold Water" (EP, Moshi Moshi)

Landshapes

- 2013: Rambutan (Album, Bella Union)
- 2013: "Insomniacs Club" (Single, Bella Union)
- 2015: Heyoon (Album, Bella Union)
- 2020: Contact (Album, Bella Union)
- 2020: Whale Song (Album, Bella Union)
